= Bloomvale Historic District =

Historic district in New York, United States

- U.S. National Register of Historic Places
- U.S. Historic district
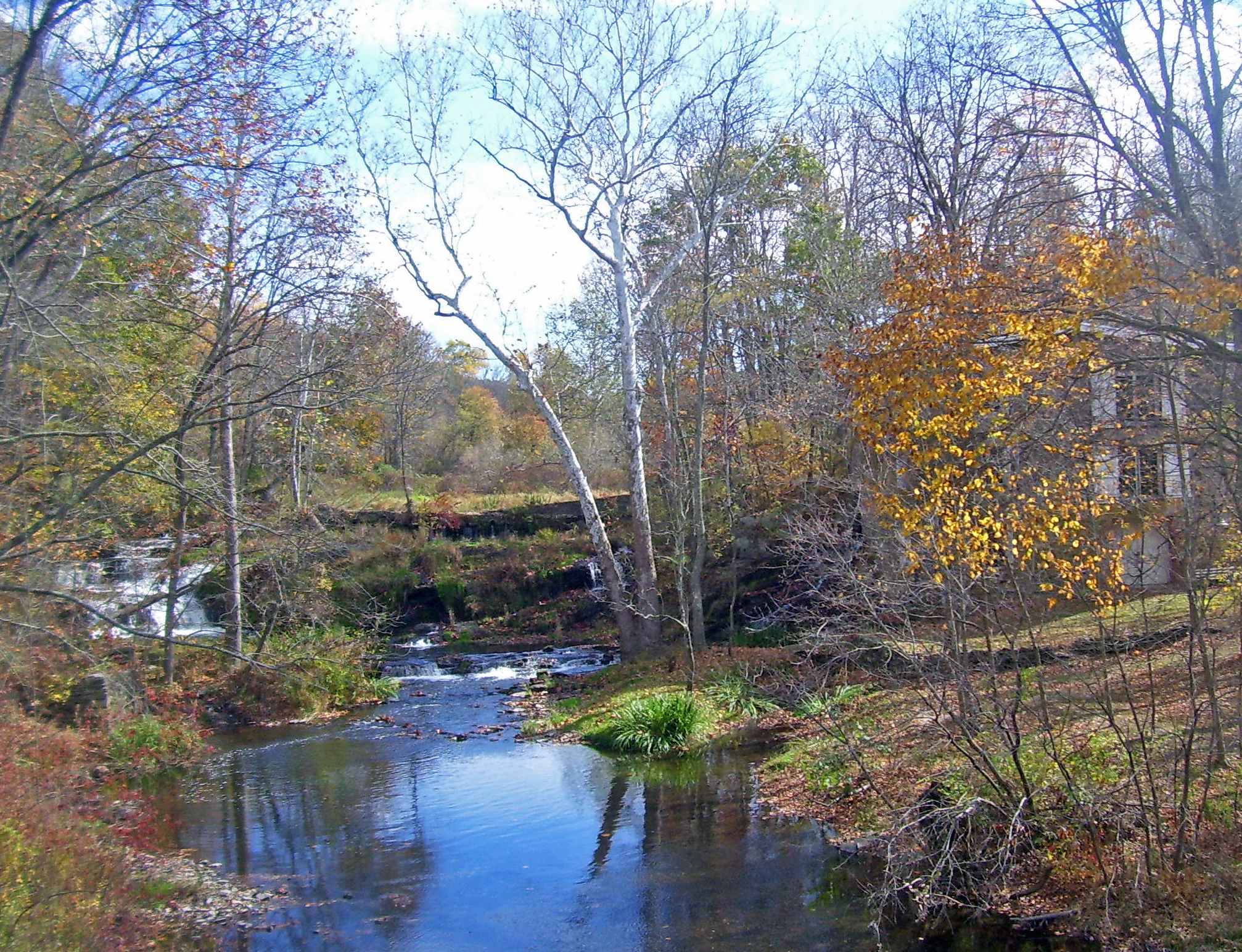
- Dam, bridge abutments and mill house, 2008

- Location within New York
- Location: Salt Point, NY
- Nearest city: Poughkeepsie
- Coordinates: 41°48′1″N 73°45′27″W
- Area: 38 acres (15 ha)
- Built: 1740–1920
- Architects: John Rowland, Edward Swezey
- Architectural style: Federal
- NRHP reference No.: 91001874
- Added to NRHP: 1991

The Bloomvale Historic District is located east of the hamlet of Salt Point, New York, United States. It is a collection of buildings and structures around the intersection of Clinton Corners Road (Dutchess County Route 13), state highway NY 82 and the East Branch of Wappinger Creek. Most of it is in the Town of Pleasant Valley; the eastern portion is in the Town of Washington.

The village (and thus the district) was named after Isaac Bloom, a landowner and politician in the area during and after the Revolutionary War who built a Federal style mansion and operated the first mill on the creek (and thus sometimes historically known as Bloom's Mill or Bloomdale). By the mid-19th century it had grown into a small industrial town around what was now a cotton mill. After a fire destroyed the mill, the community faded away in the early 20th century. A later owner was able to use the remaining facilities as a cider mill until almost the middle of the century. In 1991 the dam, the remaining mill buildings, and some of the houses were grouped into a historic district and listed on the National Register of Historic Places.

== Geography ==
The district is an irregularly shaped 38-acre (15 ha) parcel extending east and west from the junction of Route 82 and Clinton Corners. Its boundaries are those of the lots with the contributing properties on them. The creek forms the boundary on the east and southeast.

The area is wooded, with little land cleared around the buildings and structures. There are a total of five buildings and eight structures in the district, most of which relate to the area's history as a mill site and date to the 19th century. Two of the buildings (a house and modern garage), and one of the structures (a swimming pool), are not considered to be contributing properties. The entire area is also considered a site with potential for archeological investigations, making it the 11th contributing property.

== History ==
Originally built to attract settlement to the region, the mill property has passed through three distinct phases of use during its period of historical significance. It remained a gristmill and sawmill, supporting the area's farmers, into the mid-19th century, well after Bloom's ownership. Redeveloped as an industrial cotton mill, it led to expansion of the area's population, despite frequent changes of ownership for a quarter-century, until a fire destroyed it. In the early 20th century a new owner built a cider mill on the site although it is not known whether it was commercially successful or not.

=== 1730s–1839: Gristmill and sawmill ===
The first record of a mill at Bloomvale is a 1749 deed for a nearby tract that describes it as being "west of the kill that Isaac Filkins grist mill stands on." Filkins had inherited the land from his father Henry, one of the Great Nine Partners of the area's royal land grant. 11 years earlier, in 1738; it is not known if there was a mill at that time. There is a strong possibility that there was as most large landowners had set them up on their holdings by that time, in order to encourage European settlement.

The mill continued to be referred to as "Filkin's mill" in land records for the rest of the century. Sometime around the Revolution, though, it became just a name, as Isaac Filkins sold the mill property to a younger man named Isaac Bloom, who may have come to Dutchess County from what is now Brooklyn. The younger man signed a 1775 deed for a nearby property as a witness, and Benson Lossing's 1852 Pictorial History of the Revolution records the Continental Army encamped at "Bloom's Mills." That name may be anachronistic, but by 1781 another local deed references Bloom as a nearby landowner, and in 1785 he took out a mortgage on 277 acres (112 ha) that contained the current mill property.

Bloom's 1808 obituary records that he was in the local militia during the Revolutionary War. After independence, he continued to devote himself to public service. He served as the first town clerk after the war, in Clinton, of which Bloomvale was still part at that time. After service as a county judge, a title he kept for most of his life, he was elected to the New York State Assembly and later the State Senate. At the time of his death he had been elected to the U.S. House of Representatives and was awaiting the start of his term.

Bloomvale was his country seat, and he built the large Federal style mansion on the southwest corner of the two roads around 1801. It is angled diagonally, to face the mill and the creek. Its decoration and size epitomize the highest of the Federal style in rural Dutchess County of that time. Today the building is the most architecturally significant in the district.

After Isaac Bloom's death, his estate was divided among his six surviving children and the children of a seventh who had died before him. The complicated and delicate subdivision of his land this entailed required that it be surveyed accurately, and this was done in 1809, adding considerably to the historical record. It shows that the mill property was separated from the house, and two new farms created. The deed records from this period are confusing, but show that Jonathan Bloom, the son who began living in the house after his father died, acquired four shares of the estate from his siblings. The proceeds from the subdivision were used to settle the estate's debts.

A mortgage the family took out was nevertheless allowed to default, and in 1826 the Blooms lost the properties to a William Thurston of New York City. Four years later, in 1830, he in turn sold it to Rowland Hazard of South Kingstown, Rhode Island. His family was already involved in the emerging textile industry, with wool and cotton mills in South Carolina and Pennsylvania in addition to their native state. The Bloom property was the latest in a series of acquisitions related to that, moving up the Wappinger Creek valley, where agricultural output was declining to the point that it could no longer sustain the original gristmills.

=== 1840–1875: Cotton mill ===
Hazard was unable to industrialize the Bloom mill, since it is still described as a sawmill and gristmill in his 1839 will. His wife and daughters subdivided the farm property, which they continued to live on, and leased the mill to an Isaac Merritt and Charles Frost in 1845, on the condition that the two built a cotton mill and housing at their own expense within a decade. By 1850, they had done so, since it is depicted on a contemporary county map. According to the 1850 census's industrial schedule, the mill employed 35 and produced 30,000 pounds (14,000 kg) of cotton yarn per year. That record also refers to its location as Bloomvale, the first recorded use of that name.

The only recorded use of "Bloomdale" is on the 1856 deed from the Hazards' sale of the property to Troy industrialist David Thomas Vail, for $6,000 ($215,000 in contemporary dollars). It is possible that it was a misnomer. The deed also suggests that Merritt and Frost fulfilled the terms of their lease but did not renew it, since a Charick Rosencranz is given as the mill operator. Vail's purchase may have purely speculative, or a way of buying the Hazards out, since the next year he resold the property to Rosencranz for $20,000 ($691,000 in contemporary dollars).

The high purchase price led Rosencranz's mortgage, like the Blooms', into default. In 1862 a man named Benjamin Pond acquired the property after foreclosure for $2,100 ($68,000 in contemporary dollars). Rosencranz apparently remained as its manager or in some significant capacity since the 1870 census's industrial schedule calls it "Rosencranz and Pond's Bloomvale Factory". By that time, it employed 60 and had increased production to 208,000 pounds (94,000 kg) annually. Bloomvale was a thriving industrial village, and Pond gave $10,000 for the construction of a Dutch Reformed Church chapel for it, an outgrowth of a Sunday school he had started for workers' children.

Two years after the census, Pond sold the mill to a group of investors from Philadelphia for $17,000 ($457,000 in contemporary dollars). He had to foreclose on them three years later, in 1875. The property was sold at auction for $3,916 ($115,000 in contemporary dollars) to another Philadelphia man, Henry Carson.

This period of the mill's history is sketchy. Local lore holds that the cotton mill burned down in 1873, but it is difficult to tell from the written record, since all the property transfers from this period refer to the "Bloomvale Factory." The 1875 sale price, the first one after the date of the fire, is the lowest although it is hard to tell since the value of the property had fluctuated wildly. Carson owned the property for 22 years, for purposes unknown. By the time his heirs sold it to Susan Titus in 1897, the price had dropped to $2,500 ($97,000 in contemporary dollars), the lowest until she sold it to Edwin Swezey, an engineer from Brooklyn, for $1 ($36 in contemporary dollars).

=== 1876–present: Cider mill ===
The workers had gradually moved out after the fire, and the last vestige of Bloomvale's industrial prime ended when the chapel stopped holding services in 1910. Swezey, who expanded the mill property to 500 acres (200 ha), built a 40-foot (12 m)-square cider mill out of the ruined stones from the cotton mill, with help from reinforced concrete and steel, in 1913. Swezey hired Frank Vitale, an Italian immigrant from Brooklyn, NY, to perform the stone masonry work for the rebuilding of the mill. Swezey also restored the manager's house and one of the surviving workers' houses.

In 1919 the Bloom mansion, somewhat neglected by a succession of owners during the previous century save for the addition of a veranda and kitchen wing, received new attention. New owners, and local historians, recognized its historic importance and kept it to better standards as Dutchess County began to become a popular weekend home site for wealthy New Yorkers. The construction of the Taconic State Parkway, which passes nearby, over the next several decades made it easily accessible by automobile from the city and thus even more attractive.

Swezey may or may not have been successful with his cider mill, but he continued to subdivide and sell portions of the onetime Bloom property for the rest of his life. After his death in 1945, his widow sold the mill property and 50 acres (20 ha) to Joseph DeNatale of Yonkers. In 1950 the house's veranda was removed; in 1989 the chapel was demolished. The present owner has combined most of the surviving mill properties into one parcel.

== Contributing properties ==
There are five buildings and eight structures within the district. Of these 13 resources, 10 are considered contributing properties. In addition the entire district is considered an additional resource for what it might yield in archeological investigations.

=== Bloom House ===
Isaac Bloom built this five-bay two-story clapboard-sided side-gabled Federal style mansion in approximately 1801, at the height of his prosperity. Its front facade facing northeast, allowing a view of the mill property. Exterior decoration includes a Palladian window, door sidelights and leaded glass transom. Windows have splayed block lintels, scored and keyed to look like masonry. The roof line is accentuated with blocked modillions that form pediments on the gable ends. In the front is a paved terrace with broad steps descending to the lawn.

Inside the house follows a central hall plan with large rooms in the front on either side and smaller ones in back that has been minimally altered. Most of the interior trim is restrained. Doors are paneled on only one side, and the cherry stair rail has no additional finish. The most decorated piece in the house is one of the parlor fireplaces, which has carved in its mantelpiece swags flanking a central urn under the shelf with garlands hanging down the flanking pilasters. The firebox complements this with a gray marble surround. Picture windows have been added to the rear of both first floor rooms.

The second floor is similarly furnished but with even more restraint. In the attic the open rafters allow a view of the craftsmanship involved in the queen post framing; it has been left unfinished. The basement has been renovated into additional living space.

During the 19th century, a kitchen wing was added to the south and a veranda, since removed, added to the front. Two other buildings are amid the five acres (2 ha) of lawns and landscaping on the property, a contributing wellhouse and noncontributing garage. Barns that were once on the property no longer exist; one was replaced with the garage. The swimming pool to its south is the only non-contributing structure in the district.

=== Mill complex ===
The 1913 stone cider mill, its 2½-foot–thick (76 cm) walls built partly with stones from the ruined cotton mill, sits to the south of the creek a short distance east of Route 82. It has since been converted into a house. A small shed behind it is the other non-contributing property in the district. To the house's northwest on either side of the creek are the remaining stone abutments from the 18th-century road and bridge at the site. No remnants of the sawmill/gristmill from that time have been discovered.

Further east, along the creek, a high table that creates a waterfall marks the site of the 19th-century cotton mill, with a mill pond still behind it. Foundation and ground floor wall sections are all that remain of the 45-by-96-foot (14 by 29 m) two-story structure. To the north and east are smaller remains of foundations, the sites of two workers' homes. Further east is another, smaller foundation, the remnants of an icehouse.

The only surviving workers' home is to the south of the mill site, on a rise above the road. The former mill manager's house further south is still extant. It has been altered and enlarged and is no longer considered sufficiently historic, so the district boundaries were drawn to exclude it.

== See also ==
- National Register of Historic Places listings in Dutchess County, New York
