= List of county routes in Dutchess County, New York =

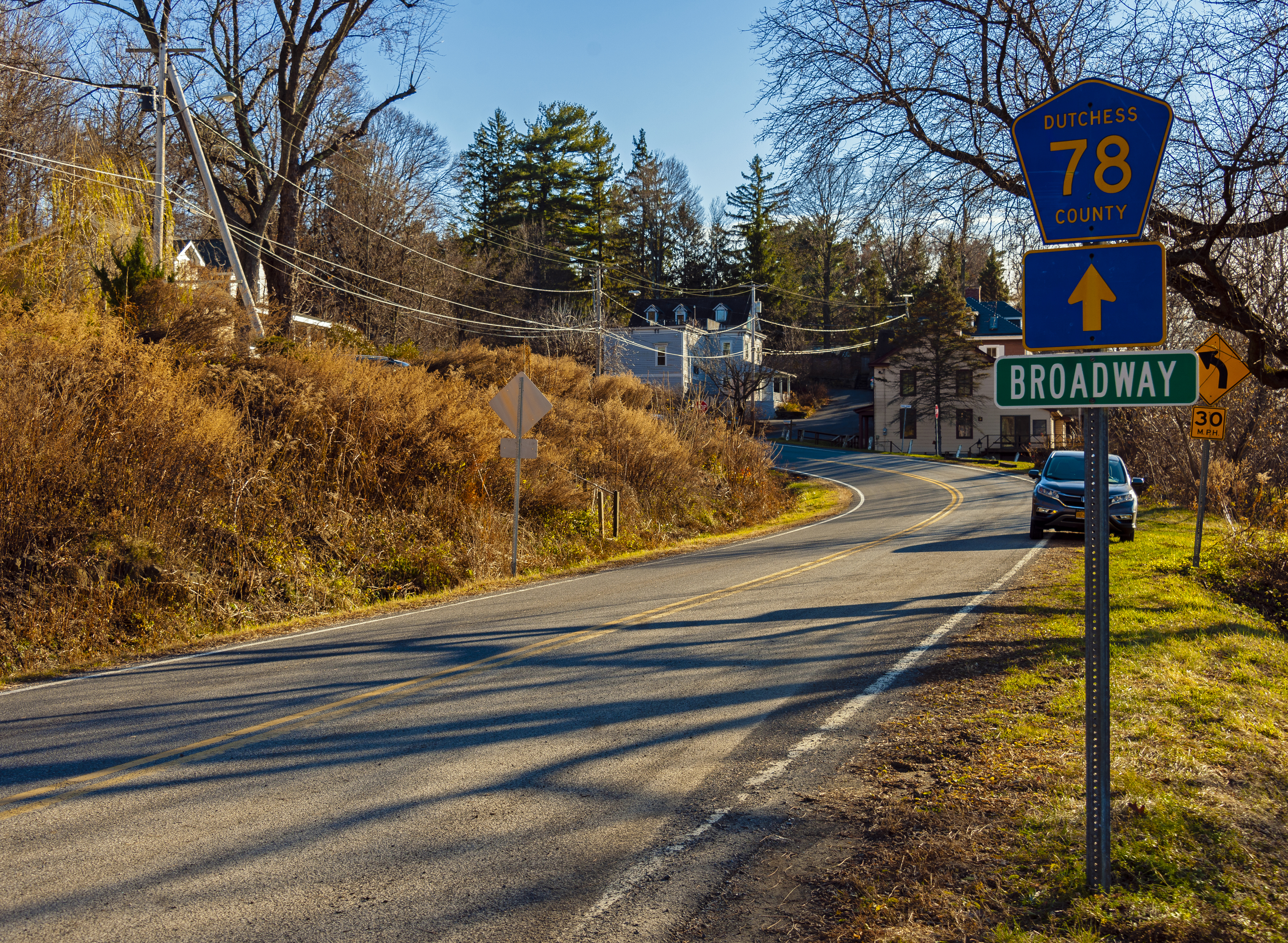
- Signage along CR 78 in Tivoli, marking the pentagon-shaped signage used by Dutchess County.

Highway names
- Interstates: Interstate X (I-X)
- US Highways: U.S. Route X (US X)
- State: New York State Route X (NY X)
- County: County Route X (CR X)

System links
- New York Highways; Interstate; US; State; Reference; Parkways

Dutchess County, New York maintains a system of signed county routes primarily to serve local traffic between the various communities in the county. Route numbers below 100 generally increase progressively based on the alphabetical order of the towns where they are primarily located, beginning with Amenia and ending with Washington; however, several exceptions exist. The newer routes numbered 100 and up do not follow this pattern. County routes in Dutchess County never enter cities and only a few enter villages. Routes are signed with the Manual on Uniform Traffic Control Devices-standard yellow-on-blue pentagon route marker. These pentagon markers began to appear through the county in 1985. The original version of the county road signage debuted in 1966.

== Routes 1–50 ==
Route	Length (mi)	Length (km)	From	Via	To	Locations served	Notes
CR 1	1.89	3.04	US 44 / NY 22 in Amenia	Sharon Station Road	Connecticut state line in North East	Sharon Station	
CR 2	5.08	8.18	CR 3	South Amenia, Amenia Union, and Leedsville roads in Amenia	NY 343	South Amenia, Amenia Union, Leedsville	
CR 3	5.16	8.30	CR 81 in Amenia	South Amenia, Kent, and Bog Hollow roads	Connecticut state line in Dover (becomes CT 341)	South Amenia, Wassaic	
CR 4	4.23	6.81	Maple Lane in Dover	Poplar Hill, Benton, and Sinpatch roads	CR 3 in Amenia	Dover Plains	
CR 5	5.67	9.12	CR 83 in Amenia	Smithfield Road and Old Route 22	US 44 / NY 22 in North East	Smithfield	CR 5S splits off at east end onto the southernmost part of Old Route 22
CR 6	5.64	9.08	NY 55	Old Route 22 in Dover	NY 22	Webatuck, Dover Plains	Former routing of NY 22
CR 7	2.11	3.40	CR 9	Beekman–Poughquag Road in Beekman	NY 216	Beekman, Poughquag	
CR 8	2.64	4.25	Greenhaven train station	Greenhaven Road in Beekman	CR 9	Greenhaven, Sylvan Lake	
CR 9	16.44	26.46	NY 82 in East Fishkill	Beekman, Clove Valley, and Clove roads	NY 82 in Union Vale	Hopewell Junction, Beekman, Verbank	
CR 10	3.06	4.92	NY 82 in La Grange	Sylvan Lake Road	CR 9 in Beekman	Sylvan Lake, Arthursburg	
CR 12	0.90	1.45	Harpers Road	Schultzville Road in Clinton	Germond Road	Schultzville	
CR 13	2.22	3.57	NY 82 in Pleasant Valley	Clinton Corners Road	CR 17 in Clinton	Clinton Corners	
CR 14	8.25	13.28	NY 9G	Hollow Road in Clinton	CR 13	Pleasant Plains, Clinton Hollow, Hibernia	Discontinuous at Taconic State Parkway
CR 15	4.34	6.98	CR 19 in Clinton	Milan Hollow Road	NY 199 in Milan	Milan Hollow	
CR 16	6.99	11.25	NY 115 in Hyde Park	Quaker Lane	CR 14 in Clinton	Pleasant Plains	
CR 17	4.68	7.53	Taconic Parkway / NY 115 in Clinton	Salt Point Turnpike	NY 82 in Stanford	Clinton Corners, Stanfordville	
CR 18	7.99	12.86	NY 115 in Pleasant Valley	Clinton Hollow and Centre roads	CR 19 in Clinton	Salt Point, Clinton Hollow, Silver Lake	
CR 19	11.27	18.14	NY 9G in Rhinebeck	Slate Quarry and Bulls Head roads	NY 82 in Stanford	Silver Lake, Stanfordville	
CR 20	5.80	9.33	Lakeside Drive, Corbin Road and Charles Coleman Boulevard in Pawling	West Dover and Hoags Corners roads	CR 21 in Dover	Pawling, Wingdale	
CR 21	18.52	29.81	NY 55 in La Grange	Noxon Road, Bruzgul, Wingdale Mountain, and Pleasant Ridge roads	NY 55 in Dover	Manchester Bridge, LaGrangeville, Wingdale	
CR 22	2.07	3.33	NY 55	Dog Tail Corners Road in Dover	Connecticut state line	Webatuck	
CR 23	3.11	5.01	CR 24 in Dover	Little Rest Road	NY 343 in Washington	Chestnut Ridge, Little Rest	
CR 24	6.75	10.86	CR 9 in Union Vale	Chestnut Ridge and Halls Corners roads	NY 343 in Washington	Chestnut Ridge	
CR 26	4.07	6.55	CR 6	Cricket Hill and Dover Furnace roads in Dover	NY 22	South Dover	
CR 27	1.27	2.04	I-84 exit 50	Lime Kiln Road in East Fishkill	NY 52		
CR 28	6.09	9.80	Main Street in Poughkeepsie	New Hamburg and Old Hopewell roads	NY 82 in East Fishkill	New Hamburg, Hughsonville, Hopewell Junction	
CR 29	4.93	7.93	NY 52	Carpenter, Clove Branch, and Hillside Lake roads in East Fishkill	NY 376	Fishkill Plains	
CR 30	4.04	6.50	White Pond Road in East Fishkill	Milltown and Holmes roads	NY 292 in Pawling	Holmes	
CR 31	2.29	3.69	NY 52	Palen Road in East Fishkill	NY 82	Wiccopee, Hopewell Junction	
CR 32	3.74	6.02	NY 55 in Beekman	Pleasant Ridge Road	CR 21 in Union Vale	Poughquag, Pleasant Ridge	
CR 33	3.00	4.83	CR 29 in East Fishkill	Hillside Lake and Arthursburg roads	CR 42 in La Grange	Fishkill Plains, Hillside Lake, LaGrangeville	
CR 34	2.96	4.76	NY 9D at Wappinger–Fishkill town line	Baxtertown Road and Jackson Street	NY 52 in Fishkill village	Castle Point, Fishkill	CR 34S splits off to the southwest near western end
CR 35	2.11	3.40	CR 34 in Fishkill	Osborne Hill Road	US 9 in Wappinger	Fishkill, Hughsonville	
CR 36	1.58	2.54	NY 52 Business	Red School House Road in Fishkill	NY 9D	Glenham	
CR 37	1.38	2.22	US 9	North Cross Road in Hyde Park	NY 9G	Staatsburg	
CR 38	1.14	1.83	NY 983W / CR 114	Taft Avenue and Van Wagner Road in Poughkeepsie	Tucker Drive	Arlington	
CR 39	3.41	5.49	NY 115	Cream Street in Hyde Park	CR 41	East Park	
CR 40	2.40	3.86	NY 9G	East Dorsey Lane and Dutchess Hill Road in Hyde Park	CR 39	Fairview	
CR 40A	1.17	1.88	US 9	St. Andrews Road in Hyde Park	NY 9G	Hyde Park	
CR 41	8.49	13.66	Park entrance in Hyde Park	River Road, Market Street, and Crum Elbow and Netherwood roads	NY 115 in Pleasant Valley	Hyde Park, East Park, Netherwood, Salt Point	
CR 42	0.51	0.82	Taconic State Parkway	Arthursburg Road in La Grange	CR 33	Arthursburg	
CR 43	0.82	1.32	CR 46 in La Grange	DeGarmo Road	US 44 in Poughkeepsie	Manchester Bridge, Arlington	
CR 44	0.90	1.45	NY 376	Red Oaks Mill and Walker roads in La Grange	CR 49	Red Oaks Mill	CR 44S splits off to the south at the southern end
CR 46	4.04	6.50	NY 55	Overlook Road in La Grange	CR 47 east junction	Manchester Bridge	
CR 47	5.31	8.55	NY 55 in La Grange	Freedom Road and South Avenue	US 44 in Pleasant Valley	Freedom Plains, Pleasant Valley	
CR 48	0.74	1.19	IBM Poughkeepsie	Sand Dock and IBM roads in Poughkeepsie	US 9	Crown Heights	
CR 49	4.14	6.66	NY 55 in Poughkeepsie	Old Manchester and Titusville roads	NY 55 in La Grange	Manchester Bridge, Titusville	CR 49S splits off to the northwest at western end
CR 50	2.87	4.62	Columbia County line in Milan (becomes CR 2)	Jackson Corners and Mount Ross roads	NY 199 in Pine Plains	Jackson Corners	Comprises two segments connected by eastern segment of CR 2 in Columbia County

== Routes 51–100 ==
Route	Length (mi)	Length (km)	From	Via	To	Locations served	Notes
CR 51	5.24	8.43	NY 199	Academy Hill Road in Milan	CR 50	Jackson Corners	
CR 52	3.76	6.05	NY 308 in Rhinebeck	Salisbury Turnpike and Round Lake Road	CR 15 in Milan	Eighmyville	
CR 53	6.04	9.72	NY 82 in Stanford	Cold Spring and South roads	NY 199 in Milan	Bangall, Lafayetteville	
CR 54	4.18	6.73	NY 199	Milan Hill Road in Milan	CR 56	Rock City	
CR 55	2.18	3.51	CR 56 Turkey Hill in Red Hook	Spring Lake Road	Columbia County line in Milan (becomes CR 19)	Cokertown	
CR 56	6.18	9.95	US 9 in Red Hook	Upper Red Hook and Turkey Hill roads	CR 50 in Milan	Upper Red Hook, Jackson Corners	
CR 57	6.82	10.98	NY 82	Shunpike in Washington	US 44	Shunpike, Lithgow	
CR 58	1.17	1.88	US 44 / NY 22	Coleman Station Road in North East	Reagan Road	Coleman Station	
CR 59	3.33	5.36	CR 83 in North East	Bean River Road	Columbia County line in Pine Plains (becomes CR 8A)	Pulvers Corners	
CR 60	2.30	3.70	NY 199	Winchell Mountain Road in North East	NY 22	Irondale	North leg of wye junction with NY 199 designated CR 60S
CR 61	2.69	4.33	CR 58	Indian Lake Road in North East	CR 62	Coleman Station, Indian Lake	
CR 62	5.84	9.40	Connecticut state line in North East (becomes CT 361)	Sharon Road, Maple Avenue, and Rudd Pond Road	NY 22 in North East	Millerton, Mount Riga	Part south of US 44 was formerly NY 361
CR 63	4.11	6.61	CR 62	Boston Corners Road in North East	Columbia County line	Boston Corner, Mount Riga	
CR 64	3.74	6.02	CR 83	McGhee Hill Road in North East	US 44 / NY 22	North East Center	
CR 65	8.03	12.92	NY 82 in Stanford	Hunns Lake Road	CR 83 in North East	Bangall	Includes CR 65S, an alternate loop route around north side of Hunns Lake
CR 66	4.72	7.60	South Quaker Hill and Birch Hill Roads	Old Quaker Hill Road in Pawling	CR 68	Quaker Hill	Part between CR 67 and CR 67A was formerly part of NY 341
CR 67	3.20	5.15	NY 22 / NY 55	Quaker Hill Road in Pawling	CR 66	Quaker Hill	Formerly part of NY 341
CR 67A	1.19	1.92	CR 66	Kirby Hill Road in Pawling	Connecticut state line		Formerly part of NY 341
CR 68	5.00	8.05	NY 22 / NY 55	North Quaker Hill Road in Pawling	Connecticut state line	Hurd Corners, Quaker Hill	
CR 69	3.47	5.58	Putnam County line in Pawling (becomes CR 63)	Harmony Road and Dutcher Avenue	West Main Street in Pawling		Discontinuous at NY 55
CR 70	1.00	1.61	CR 83	Righters Corners Road in Pine Plains	NY 82 / NY 199	Hammertown	
CR 71	1.24	2.00	NY 115	West Road in Pleasant Valley	US 44	Pleasant Valley	
CR 72	4.38	7.05	US 44	North Avenue in Pleasant Valley	NY 115	Pleasant Valley, Salt Point	
CR 73	0.61	0.98	NY 115	Sherow Road in Pleasant Valley	CR 72	Pleasant Valley	
CR 74	0.79	1.27	NY 113	Cedar Avenue in Poughkeepsie	Poughkeepsie city line	Spackenkill	
CR 75	0.92	1.48	Poughkeepsie city line	Innis Avenue in Poughkeepsie	Salt Point Turnpike (NY 984A)		Entire length overlaps with NY 115
CR 77	3.68	5.92	US 9 / NY 9D	Vassar Road in Poughkeepsie	NY 113 / NY 376	Wappingers Falls, Red Oaks Mill	
CR 78	5.71	9.19	Rose Hill Lane in Tivoli	Broadway and Kerley Corners Road	Columbia County line in Red Hook (becomes CR 2)	Kerley Corners	Section west of NY 9G was formerly part of NY 402
CR 79	3.63	5.84	NY 199	Linden Avenue and Budds Corners Road in Red Hook	NY 9G	Red Hook, Linden Acres	
CR 80	2.05	3.30	NY 9G	Lasher Road in Red Hook	Columbia County line (becomes CR 4)		
CR 81	4.11	6.61	NY 22 / NY 343	Old Route 22 in Amenia	NY 22 / NY 343	Wassaic, Amenia	Former routing of NY 22
CR 82	1.10	1.77	Dock Road	Barrytown Road in Red Hook	NY 9G / NY 199	Barrytown	Formerly part of NY 199
CR 83	12.34	19.86	US 44 in Amenia	Smithfield Valley Road	NY 82 in Pine Plains	Amenia, Pine Plains	Formerly NY 82A
CR 83A	0.94	1.51	NY 82 / NY 199	North Main Street in Pine Plains	Hoffman Road		Former routing of NY 82
CR 84	3.24	5.21	US 9 in Staatsburg	Old Albany Post and Primrose Hill roads	NY 9G in Rhinebeck	Wurtemberg	Connects US 9 to US 9G
CR 85	2.98	4.80	US 9 via Cove Road	South Mill and Morton roads in Rhinebeck	Kelly Street	Rhinecliff	
CR 86	6.51	10.48	CR 65 in Stanford	Bangall–Amenia Road	US 44 at Washington–Amenia town line	Bangall	
CR 87	0.58	0.93	CR 65	Millis Lane in Stanford	NY 82	Bangall, McIntyre	
CR 88	1.26	2.03	NY 82	Attlebury Hill and East Hunns Lake roads in Stanford	CR 65	Attlebury, Hunns Lake	
CR 89	4.10	6.60	NY 82 in La Grange	Waterbury Hill Road	CR 9 in Union Vale	Billings, Verbank	
CR 90	4.72	7.60	NY 82	Camby Road in Union Vale	CR 24	Verbank, Camby, Chestnut Ridge	
CR 91	1.11	1.79	CR 28	Creek Road in Wappinger	Wappingers Falls village line	Hughsonville	
CR 92	1.31	2.11	Liberty Street	Market Street, Broadway Avenue, and Chelsea Road in Wappinger	NY 9D / CR 34	Chelsea, Castle Point	
CR 93	4.47	7.19	NY 9D	Middlebush Road and Myers Corners roads in Wappinger	NY 376	Myers Corner	
CR 94	4.79	7.71	NY 82	All Angels Hill Road in Wappinger	NY 376 / CR 104	Swartoutville, Myers Corner, New Hackensack	
CR 95	0.70	1.13	NY 82	Oak Summit Road in Washington	0.70 miles (1.13 km) east of NY 82	Millbrook Heights	
CR 96	2.06	3.32	Oak Summit Road	Altamont Road in Washington	NY 343	Oak Summit, South Millbrook	
CR 97	0.60	0.97	CR 95	County House Road in Washington	CR 111	Millbrook Heights, South Millbrook	
CR 98	3.29	5.29	US 44 / CR 99	North Mabbettsville Road in Washington	CR 57	Mabbettsville	
CR 99	1.45	2.33	NY 343	Little Rest Road in Washington	US 44 / CR 98	Littlerest, Mabbettsville	
CR 100	1.38	2.22	Cottage Road in Poughkeepsie	Creek Road	CR 40 in Hyde Park	Fairview	

== Routes 101 and up ==
Route	Length (mi)	Length (km)	From	Via	To	Locations served	Notes
CR 101	0.72	1.16	NY 308	Violet Hill Road in Rhinebeck	NY 9G	Rhinebeck village	
CR 103	7.68	12.36	NY 982M in Rhinebeck	River Road/Annandale Road	NY 9G in Red Hook	Rhinecliff, Annandale-on-Hudson	
CR 104	2.93	4.72	US 9 in Wappingers Falls	New Hackensack Road	NY 376 / CR 94 in Wappinger	New Hackensack	Formerly NY 9E
CR 105	1.58	2.54	NY 22	Sinpatch Road in Amenia	CR 4	Wassaic	
CR 110	0.92	1.48	CR 77 in Poughkeepsie	Jackson Road	CR 104 in Wappinger		
CR 111	0.32	0.51	NY 82	Old Route 82 in Washington	NY 343	South Millbrook	Former routing of NY 82
CR 114	0.48	0.77	Poughkeepsie city line	Main Street in Poughkeepsie	NY 983W / CR 38	Arlington	

== See also ==
- County routes in New York
