= New York State Route 361 =

Former highway in New York

New York State Route 361
- Map of northeastern Dutchess County with NY 361 highlighted in red

Route information
- Maintained by NYSDOT
- Length: 2.37 mi (3.81 km)
- Existed: April 1935–April 1, 1980

Major junctions
- South end: Route 361 at the Connecticut state line
- North end: US 44 in Millerton

Location
- Country: United States
- State: New York
- Counties: Dutchess

Highway system
- New York Highways; Interstate; US; State; Reference; Parkways
← NY 360	→ NY 362

New York State Route 361 (NY 361) was a state highway located in Dutchess County, New York, in the United States. The southern terminus of the route was at the Connecticut state line, where it continued to Sharon, Connecticut, as Route 361. The northern terminus was at U.S. Route 44 (US 44) in Millerton. NY 361 was designated in April 1935 and removed from the state highway system and replaced with County Route 62 (CR 62) in 1980 as part of a large-scale highway maintenance swap between the New York State Department of Transportation and the Dutchess County highway department.

== Route description ==
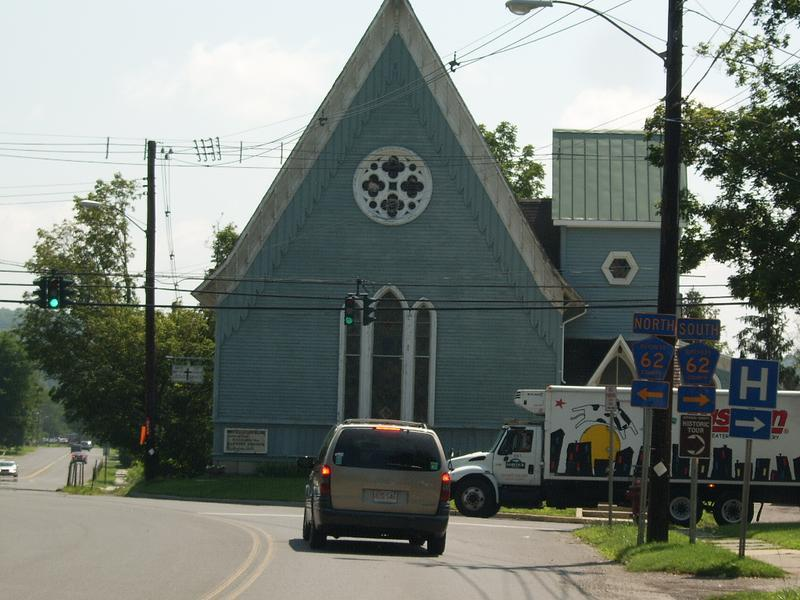
Current view of NY 361's northern terminus at US 44

NY 361 began as a continuation of Connecticut's Route 361 adjacent to the bi-state water body of Indian Lake in the town of North East. The route traveled northward on Sharon Road, paralleling the Webatuck Creek to Millerton, where it became South Maple Avenue and terminated at an intersection with US 44 (Main Street). The road itself, however, continued northward to NY 22 in the hamlet of Mount Riga as North Maple Avenue and, outside the village, Rudd Pond Road, connecting Millerton to the Rudd Pond area of Taconic State Park.

== History ==
NY 361 was assigned in April 1931 to a short north–south highway connecting US 44 in Millerton to Route 4 (later Route 361) at the Connecticut state line. The route remained unchanged until April 1, 1980, when ownership and maintenance of the route was transferred to Dutchess County as part of a large scale highway maintenance swap. As part of the swap, NY 361, the routing of NY 82A from Amenia to Pine Plains, NY 402, and three reference routes near the hamlets of Barrytown (near Red Hook), Pine Plains, and East Park (near Hyde Park) were given to the county by the New York State Department of Transportation in exchange for maintenance of the segment of NY 82 between NY 199 and the Columbia County line. Also exchanged was a county route bypassing Millbrook to the northwest (which became NY 44A and later US 44), the portion of the Salt Point Turnpike north of Smith Street in Poughkeepsie (NY 115), and Spackenkill Road between US 9 and NY 376 in Poughkeepsie (NY 113). The former routing of NY 361 is now part of CR 62, which continues north of US 44 to NY 22 in Mount Riga.

== Major intersections ==
The entire route was in Dutchess County.

Location	mi	km	Destinations	Notes
North East	0.00	0.00	Route 361 south	Continuation into Connecticut
Millerton	2.37	3.81	US 44	Northern terminus
1.000 mi = 1.609 km; 1.000 km = 0.621 mi

== See also ==
- List of county routes in Dutchess County, New York
