= New York State Route 115 =

State highway in Dutchess County, New York, US

New York State Route 115
- Salt Point Turnpike
- Map of Dutchess County in southeastern New York with NY 115 highlighted in red and NY 984A in blue

Route information
- Maintained by NYSDOT, Dutchess County, and the city of Poughkeepsie
- Length: 12.45 mi (20.04 km)
- Existed: April 1, 1980–present

Major junctions
- South end: US 44 / NY 55 in Poughkeepsie
- North end: CR 17 / Taconic State Parkway in Clinton

Location
- Country: United States
- State: New York
- Counties: Dutchess

Highway system
- New York Highways; Interstate; US; State; Reference; Parkways
← NY 114	→ NY 116

New York State Route 115 (NY 115) is a 12.45-mile (20.04 km) long state highway located entirely within Dutchess County, New York. The route runs from an intersection with U.S. Route 44 (US 44) and NY 55 in the city of Poughkeepsie along the former Salt Point Turnpike to an interchange with the Taconic State Parkway in Clinton. Throughout its length NY 115 is maintained by the city of Poughkeepsie, Dutchess County (as CR 75), and the New York State Department of Transportation. When NY 115 terminates at the Taconic State Parkway, the Salt Point Turnpike continues as County Route 17 (CR 17) for another four miles to NY 82 in Stanford. NY 115 was designated on April 1, 1980 as part of a maintenance swap by the New York State Department of Transportation, which took over the portion from Smith Street to the Taconic Parkway that was originally CR 75. The portion of the turnpike from the Poughkeepsie city line to Innis Avenue was re-designated New York State Route 984A.

== Route description ==
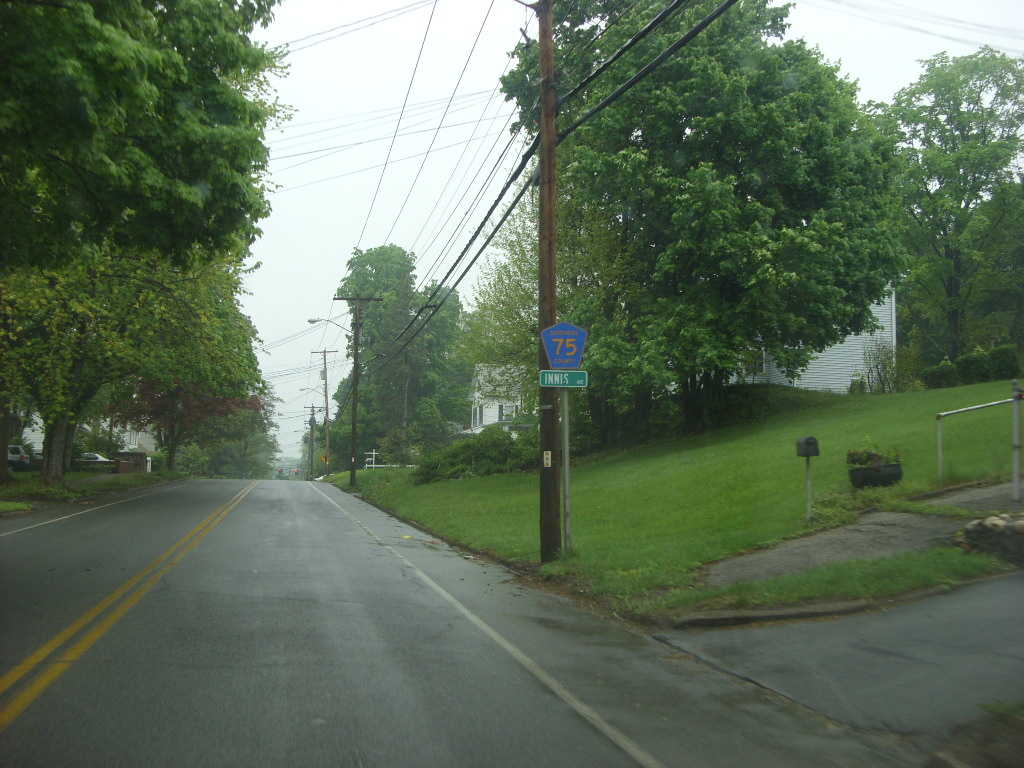
Signage on NY 115 in Poughkeepsie denoting CR 75

NY 115 begins at West Baker Street (eastbound US 44 and NY 55) in eastern Poughkeepsie. As Worrall Avenue, it heads north through the easternmost portion of the city. An intersection with West Maple Street (westbound US 44 and NY 55) soon follows after and then gains the moniker of Innis Avenue. NY 115 continues on, passing King Street Park to the east before crossing into the town of Poughkeepsie at Arnold Road. Here, maintenance of the roadway shifts from the city of Poughkeepsie to Dutchess County, which maintains the road as CR 75. This designation continues north along NY 115 to the Salt Point Turnpike, where CR 75 ends and maintenance of NY 115 switches once more to the New York State Department of Transportation (NYSDOT). NY 115 joins the Salt Point Turnpike northward, paralleling the St. Peter's Cemetery and passing near the Dutchess Community College as it enters Hyde Park.

Across the town line, NY 115 intersects with both CR 39, a connector route leading north toward the hamlet of Hyde Park, and CR 16, a parallel route to NY 9G between Hyde Park and Clinton, as it turns northeast and crosses into Pleasant Valley. NY 115 then meets CR 71 and CR 73 in quick succession as it parallels CR 72 toward the hamlet of Salt Point. The two routes converge just outside the hamlet, with NY 115 continuing toward the hamlet. Once in Salt Point, NY 115 crosses over Wappinger Creek just south of an intersection with CR 18 near the northern edge of the community. NY 115 progresses onward, paralleling Wappinger Creek into the town of Clinton, where NY 115 intersects CR 14 as Wappinger Creek turns away from the Salt Point Turnpike. The Turnpike, as well as NY 115, continue northeast to the Taconic State Parkway, where NY 115 terminates at the northbound exit ramps to the parkway. Past the Taconic, the Salt Point Turnpike continues for another 4 miles (6 km) to NY 82 in Stanford as CR 17.

== History ==
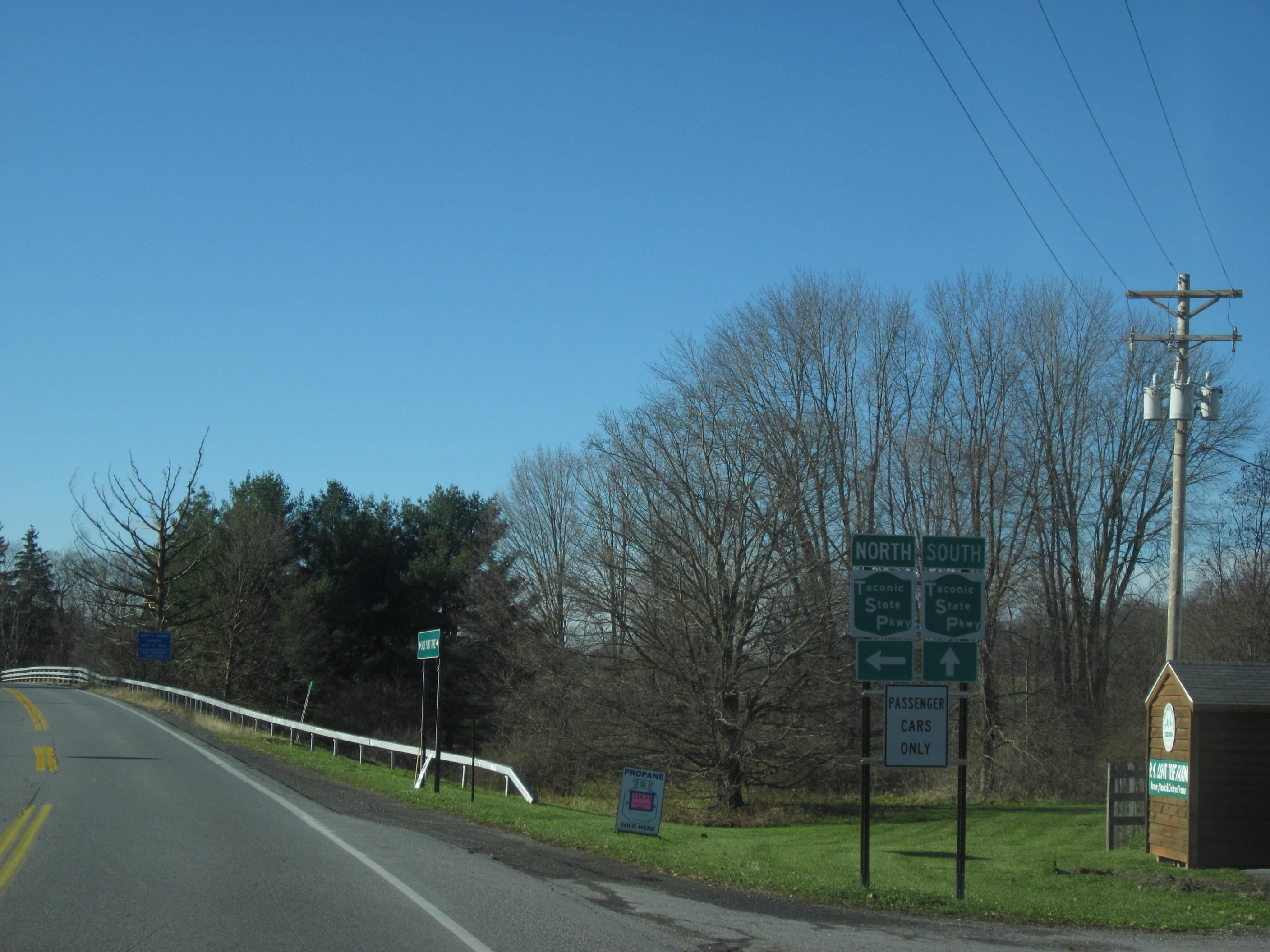
NY 115 at the Taconic State Parkway in Clinton

On March 22, 1853, the Poughkeepsie and Salt Point Plank Road Company was formed to construct a plank road from the town of Poughkeepsie to the hamlet of Salt Point. The new plank road company gave out its shares to their holders on March 8 of that year. However, nothing was constructed, and the company was in the New York State Supreme Court in 1861 suing over the ownership of stock in construction of the new roadway. When the stock was sold, the agreement stated that the plank road would extend to Clinton Corners. One stockholder, known only as Griffin, wanted the route done on a certain alignment when constructed, but protested that it was contrived differently. The company asked for the shares back from Griffin, who would not give them back.

Due to the action of the New York State Legislature in 1854, the plank road company would need to be constructed in accordance with the turnpike statutes for the state of New York, along with turnpike inspectors from Dutchess County. Once done, the company could then erect tollgates and begin collecting fares from travelers. However, by this point, ownership of the plank road stated that not one plank had been laid on the alignment provided. Due to laws passed in 1847, the company would be subject to all laws related to turnpike companies and Griffin claimed the 1854 decision got him stripped of his share of company stock. The judge decided in favor of the plank road company to get their share back, but Griffin appealed immediately. The decision was reversed on appeal

The portion of the Salt Point Turnpike from the city of Poughkeepsie to the Taconic State Parkway was initially maintained by Dutchess County. On April 1, 1980, ownership and maintenance of the highway was transferred to the state of New York as part of a highway maintenance swap between the two levels of government. The portion of the Turnpike north of its junction with Innis Avenue was designated as NY 115 while the remaining section became NY 984A, an unsigned reference route. NY 115 also extended south along Innis Avenue to West Baker Street in Poughkeepsie as a county and city-maintained highway.

Before the current NY 115 was designated, NY 115 went from NY 107 in Bethpage southward via Wantagh Avenue to Merrick Road in Wantagh; this was decommissioned in the early 1970s and is now Nassau CR 189.

== Major intersections ==
The entire route is in Dutchess County.

Location	mi	km	Destinations	Notes
City of Poughkeepsie	0.00	0.00	US 44 east / NY 55 east	Southern terminus
City of Poughkeepsie	0.11	0.18	US 44 west / NY 55 west	
Town of Poughkeepsie	1.39	2.24	Salt Point Turnpike (NY 984A west)	
Clinton	12.45	20.04	Taconic State Parkway	Exit 58 on Taconic State Parkway
Clinton	12.45	20.04	CR 17 north (Salt Point Turnpike)	Continuation north
1.000 mi = 1.609 km; 1.000 km = 0.621 mi

== See also ==
- List of county routes in Dutchess County, New York
- Wantagh Avenue – the former alignment of NY 115
