= New York State Route 341 =

Former state highway in New York State

New York State Route 341
- NY 341 highlighted in red

Route information
- Maintained by NYSDPW
- Length: 4.71 mi (7.58 km)
- Existed: c. 1934–1940s

Major junctions
- West end: NY 22 / NY 55 in Pawling village
- East end: Connecticut state line in Pawling town

Location
- Country: United States
- State: New York
- Counties: Dutchess

Highway system
- New York Highways; Interstate; US; State; Reference; Parkways
← NY 340	→ NY 342

New York State Route 341 (NY 341) was an east–west state highway located in Dutchess County, New York, in the United States. It extended for 4.71 miles (7.58 km) from an intersection with NY 22 and NY 55 in the village of Pawling to the Connecticut state line in the town of Pawling. At the state line, NY 341 continued eastward into Sherman, Connecticut, as a town road named Wakeman Road. The route crossed a largely undeveloped section of the county, utilizing parts of Quaker Hill Road, Mizzentop Road, and Kirby Hill Road.

NY 341 was originally designated as part of NY 55 in the 1930 renumbering of state highways in New York. The highway remained part of NY 55 until c. 1934 when that route was realigned to pass through Wingdale on its way to Connecticut. The old routing of NY 55 was renumbered to NY 341, which remained in place until it was removed in the 1940s. The alignment of NY 341 is now maintained by Dutchess County as parts of County Route 67 (CR 67), CR 66, and County Route 67A.

== Route description ==
NY 341 began at an intersection with NY 22 and NY 55 in the village of Pawling. The highway headed eastward along Quaker Hill Road, exiting the village as it wound its way through a mountainous, undeveloped portion of the town of Pawling. It traversed a hairpin turn at Reservoir Road prior to entering Mizzen Top, a small hamlet 1 mile (1.6 km) west of the Connecticut state line. Here, the route straightened out ahead of a T-intersection with Mizzentop Road. It turned south here, passing by the handful of homes comprising the community before turning back to the east at a junction with Kirby Hill Road and Church Street. Now on Kirby Hill Road, NY 341 proceeded generally eastward over rolling hills to the Connecticut state line, where the NY 341 designation terminated and the right-of-way continued eastward as Wakeman Road towards Sherman.

== History ==
When NY 55 was assigned as part of the 1930 renumbering of state highways in New York, it continued east from Pawling to the Connecticut state line via Quaker Hill Road. NY 55 was realigned c. 1934 to follow NY 22 north to Wingdale, where it turned east to follow its current alignment to Connecticut. The former routing of NY 55 east of Pawling became NY 341. The NY 341 designation remained in place until the 1940s when it was removed. The former routing of NY 341 is now maintained by Dutchess County as CR 67 (for Quaker Hill Road), a short portion of CR 66 (Mizzentop Road) and CR 67A (Kirby Hill Road).

== Major intersections ==
The entire route was in Dutchess County.

Location	mi	km	Destinations	Notes
Village of Pawling	0.00	0.00	NY 22 / NY 55	Western terminus
Town of Pawling	4.71	7.58	Wakeman Road	Continuation into Connecticut
1.000 mi = 1.609 km; 1.000 km = 0.621 mi

== See also ==
- List of county routes in Dutchess County, New York
