= Pleasant Plains, Dutchess County, New York =

Pleasant Plains
- Unincorporated settlement
- Interactive map of Pleasant Plains
- Coordinates: 41°50′52″N 73°51′58″W
- Country: United States
- State: New York
- County: Dutchess

Pleasant Plains is a hamlet of the town of Clinton in Dutchess County, New York, United States.

It is located along Dutchess County Road 14 east of DeWitt Mills, and west of Clinton Corners; also, to its immediate west is the town of Hyde Park. New York State Route 9G runs north-south along the west side of the community,
