= Salt Point, New York =

- Census-designated place
- Location of Salt Point, New York
- Coordinates: 41°48′22″N 73°47′41″W
- Country: United States
- State: New York
- County: Dutchess County
- Town: Pleasant Valley

Area
  - Total: 0.83 sq mi (2.16 km^{2})
  - Land: 0.83 sq mi (2.15 km^{2})
  - Water: 0.0039 sq mi (0.01 km^{2})
- Elevation: 250 ft (76 m)

Population (2020)
  - Total: 202
  - Density: 243.6/sq mi (94.05/km^{2})
- Time zone: UTC-5 (EST)
- ZIP Code: 12578
- FIPS code: 36-64892

Salt Point is a hamlet and census-designated place (CDP) located in the Town of Pleasant Valley, Dutchess County, New York, United States. As of the 2020 census it had a population of 202. It lies northeast of Poughkeepsie following New York Route 115, the Salt Point Turnpike. East of Salt Point, the Taconic State Parkway allows for access to many of the surrounding towns and communities, with easy travel to New York City. The area code is 845.

== Demographics ==
Historical population
| Census | Pop. | Note | %± |
|---|---|---|---|
| 2020 | 202 | | — |
U.S. Decennial Census

== Parks and recreation ==
The following parks are located within the general Salt Point area:

- Helen Aldrich Park, part of the Pleasant Valley town recreation system of parks
- Frances J. Mark Memorial Park, located in Clinton
- Friends' Park, also in Clinton

== Communities and locations around Salt Point ==
- Netherwood—A location southwest of Salt Point.
- Pleasant Valley—A hamlet southwest of Salt Point.
- Washington Hollow—A hamlet near the southeastern town line. It was the former location of the Dutchess County Fair.
- Hibernia—A location east of Salt Point.

| Northwest: Pleasant Plains | North: Clinton Hollow | Northeast: Clinton Corners |
| West: Netherwood | Salt Point | East: Hibernia |
| Southwest: Pleasant Valley | South: Lagrange & Freedom Plains | Southeast: Millbrook & Washington Hollow |
