= New York State Route 55 =

State highway in southern New York, US

New York State Route 55
- NY 55 highlighted in red

Route information
- Maintained by NYSDOT, NYSBA, Sullivan County, and the village of Liberty
- Length: 122.45 mi (197.06 km)
- Existed: 1930–present

Major junctions
- West end: NY 97 / PA 434 in Highland
- Future I-86 / NY 17 in Liberty; US 209 in Wawarsing; US 44 in Kerhonkson; US 9W in Lloyd; US 9 in Poughkeepsie; Taconic State Parkway in LaGrange; NY 22 in Pawling
- East end: Route 55 at the Connecticut state line near Wingdale

Location
- Country: United States
- State: New York
- Counties: Sullivan, Ulster, Dutchess

Highway system
- New York Highways; Interstate; US; State; Reference; Parkways
← NY 54A	→ NY 55A

New York State Route 55 (NY 55) is a 122.45-mile-long (197.06 km) east-west state highway in southern New York, running from the Pennsylvania state line at the Delaware River in Barryville to the Connecticut state line at Wingdale. It is the only other state highway beside NY 7 to completely cross the state, from border to border, in an east–west direction, although NY 17 does so and is partially east–west. It also forms a concurrency when it joins US 44 for 33 miles (53 km).

Together with NY 52, which it closely parallels and briefly joins in downtown Liberty, it forms the latitudinal backbone of the Hudson Valley region for non-interstate traffic. It offers the traveler a wide variety of landscapes, from farmlands, mountains and forests to the urban center of Poughkeepsie. Sights along the way include two of New York City's major reservoirs in the Catskills, a dramatic crossing of the Shawangunk Ridge, and the Mid-Hudson Bridge.

== Route description ==
=== Sullivan County ===
==== Barryville to Swan Lake ====
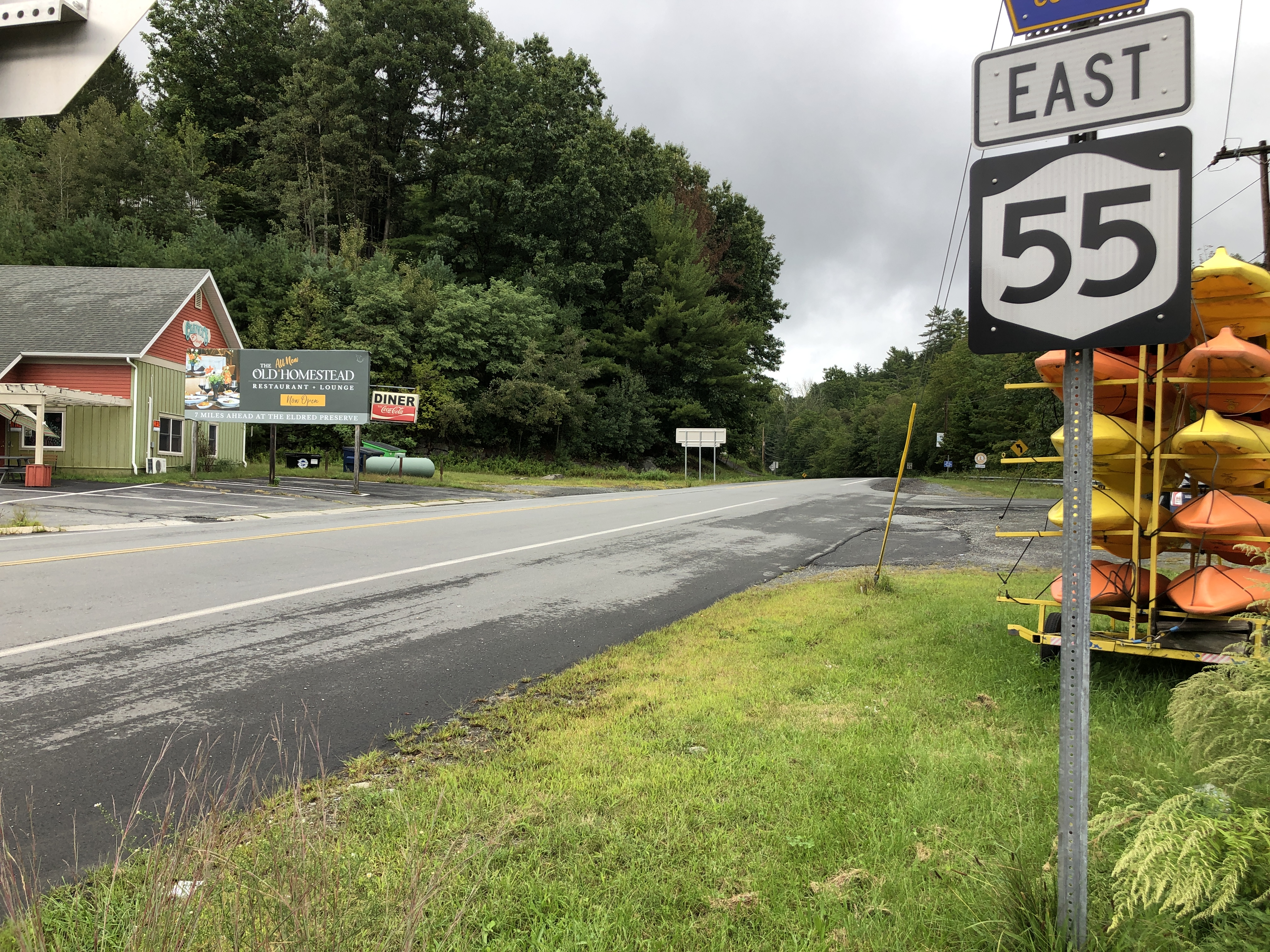
View eastbound at the western terminus of NY 55

NY 55 begins at a junction with NY 97 at the shore of the Delaware River in the hamlet of Barryville. South of this junction, the right-of-way connects to the Barryville-Shohola Bridge, which connects to PA 434 in the municipality of Shohola Township. Crossing past the former terminus of County Route 11A (CR 11A; named River Road), NY 55 proceeds north out of Barryville through the town of Highland, maintained by Sullivan County as CR 11. NY 55 and CR 11 proceed northeast through the woods above the Delaware, reaching a small residential area near Old Brook Road.

NY 55 and CR 11 wind northeast through Highland for several miles, soon turning northward past multiple residences before winding northeast into the hamlet of Eldred. NY 55 serves as the main north–south road through Eldred, crossing a junction with CR 32 (Proctor Road) and CR 33 (Eldred–Yulan Road). Soon passing the Eldred Central School, NY 55 continues northeast through Highland, now co-designated as CR 12. At Stege Road, NY 55 and CR 12 bend north past residences overlooking Steges Pond. The route soon becomes more wooded in nature, paralleling the western shore of the pond, and turns northwest past Sunrise Lake. Beginning to wind to the north, NY 55 and CR 12 pass more residences and continue north through Highland.

After a couple more turns, the routes leave the town of Highland for the town of Bethel, where the route turns northeast, passing Toronto Lake at a junction with CR 26 (Crystal Lake Road). At this junction, the co-designation changes once again as NY 55 becomes concurrent with CR 13 as it passes the Toronto Reservoir. Winding out of the reservoir area, NY 55 and CR 13 pass multiple homes as the route passes through the hamlet of Black Lake. Passing the namesake body of water, NY 55 and CR 13 bend northeast and soon northward past numerous homes for several miles. A short distance later, the routes reach a junction with NY 17B. At this junction, NY 17B and NY 55 become concurrent (and maintained by NYSDOT).

NY 17B and NY 55 proceed eastward through the town of Bethel, running along the southern shore of White Lake, passing numerous lakeside residences. A short distance later, the routes reach the hamlet of White Lake, coming to an intersection with CR 14. At this junction, NY 55 turns north onto CR 14, and the routes continue through White Lake as a two-lane residential road. At Lake Street, NY 55 and CR 14 turn northwest for several blocks, soon reaching a junction with CR 141. At this junction, the routes turn north on Swan Lake Drive, while CR 141 connects west to West Shore Road, the latter of which services the Bethel Woods Center for the Arts, the site of Woodstock in 1969.

NY 55 and CR 14 begin winding northeast through Bethel, leaving the hamlet of White Lake and soon reaching a junction with CR 183 (Airport Road). At this junction, NY 55 and CR 14 run along the northern ends of Sullivan County International Airport. The routes soon turn north, crossing Old White Lake Turnpike at the end of the airport. Paralleling the West Branch of the Mongaup River, NY 55 and CR 14 pass Woods, Pauls and Wheelers ponds before reaching the hamlet of Swan Lake. Now in the town of Liberty, NY 55 reaches a junction with CR 74 (Stanton Corners Road), where it continues north through Swan Lake co-designated with CR 15.

==== Swan Lake to the Rondout Reservoir ====
Just north of CR 74, NY 55 and CR 15 cross a junction with the eastern terminus of CR 142 (Briscoe Road). Crossing over the namesake lake, NY 55 and CR 15 soon leave the hamlet of Swan Lake, passing Fieldston Lake and multiple residences as they proceed eastward. Passing Lake Barnabee, the routes turn northeast again, crossing a junction with CR 71 (Ferndale Road). Continuing north through the town of Liberty, NY 55 and CR 15 soon reach the village of Liberty. At the village line, CR 15 terminates while NY 55 continues as Swan Lake Road and turns eastward on West Lake Street. At Carrier Street, NY 55 turns northeast and crosses into the commercial center of Liberty as Lake Street, coming to a junction with NY 52 (South Main Street).

NY 52 and NY 55 become concurrent through the village of Liberty, proceeding southeast to become Mill Street. Reaching a roundabout, NY 55 forks off of NY 52 and onto Neversink Road, which becomes concurrent with CR 16 at the village line. NY 55 and CR 16 parallel the Middle Mongaup River, entering an interchange with NY 17 (the Quickway; exit 100A). After NY 17, NY 55 and CR 16 cross the Middle Mongaup and wind eastward through the town of Liberty. At the junction with Clements Road, the routes turn northeast through a rural section of Liberty, soon reaching a junction with Kees Lake. The routes bend eastward past Kees Lake, passing some local residences before crossing into the town of Fallsburg. Past Grants Road, NY 55 and CR 16 cross east through the hamlet of Bradley, soon crossing into the town of Neversink. At the junction with Aden Road, CR 16 terminates.

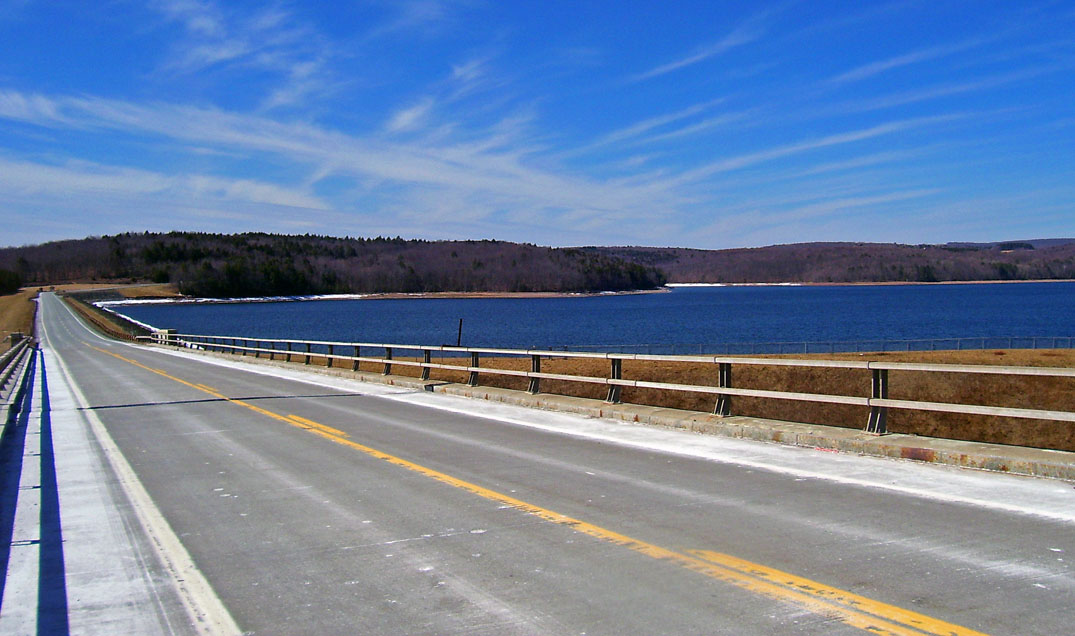
NY 55 along the dam at the Neversink Reservoir

NY 55, state-maintained again, bends southeast through Neversink, soon reaching the southern shores of the Neversink Reservoir, one of the reservoirs that serve New York City. Continuing eastward, the route reaches the southernmost point of the reservoir and a junction with CR 105 (Divine Corners Road), which connects to Loch Sheldrake. At this junction, NY 55 continues northeast along the southeastern shores of the reservoir. Crossing the spillway for the reservoir, NY 55 runs northeast into a junction with CR 105A (Hasbrouck Road). Turning away from the Neversink, the route winds north and soon northeast into the hamlet of Neversink. At the junction with Wilson Shields Road, NY 55 becomes concurrent with CR 17, crossing through the center of the hamlet.

The residential hamlet of Neversink soon is left behind by NY 55 and CR 17, continuing northeast through the namesake town. Just northeast of the junction with Myers Road, NY 55 and CR 17 cross into the Catskill Forest Preserve. Continuing past a junction with Benton Hollow Road, the route soon bends eastward through Neversink, reaching a junction with Wagner Road, where CR 17 terminates. NY 55 continues eastward alone along Neversink Road, maintained by NYSDOT once more. After a bend to the northeast, the route reaches the hamlet of Curry, where it junctions with CR 19, which connects to the Ulster County line via CR 157. Passing the Chestnut Creek Covered Bridge nearby, NY 55 quickly leaves Curry and bends southeast through the hamlet of Unionville.

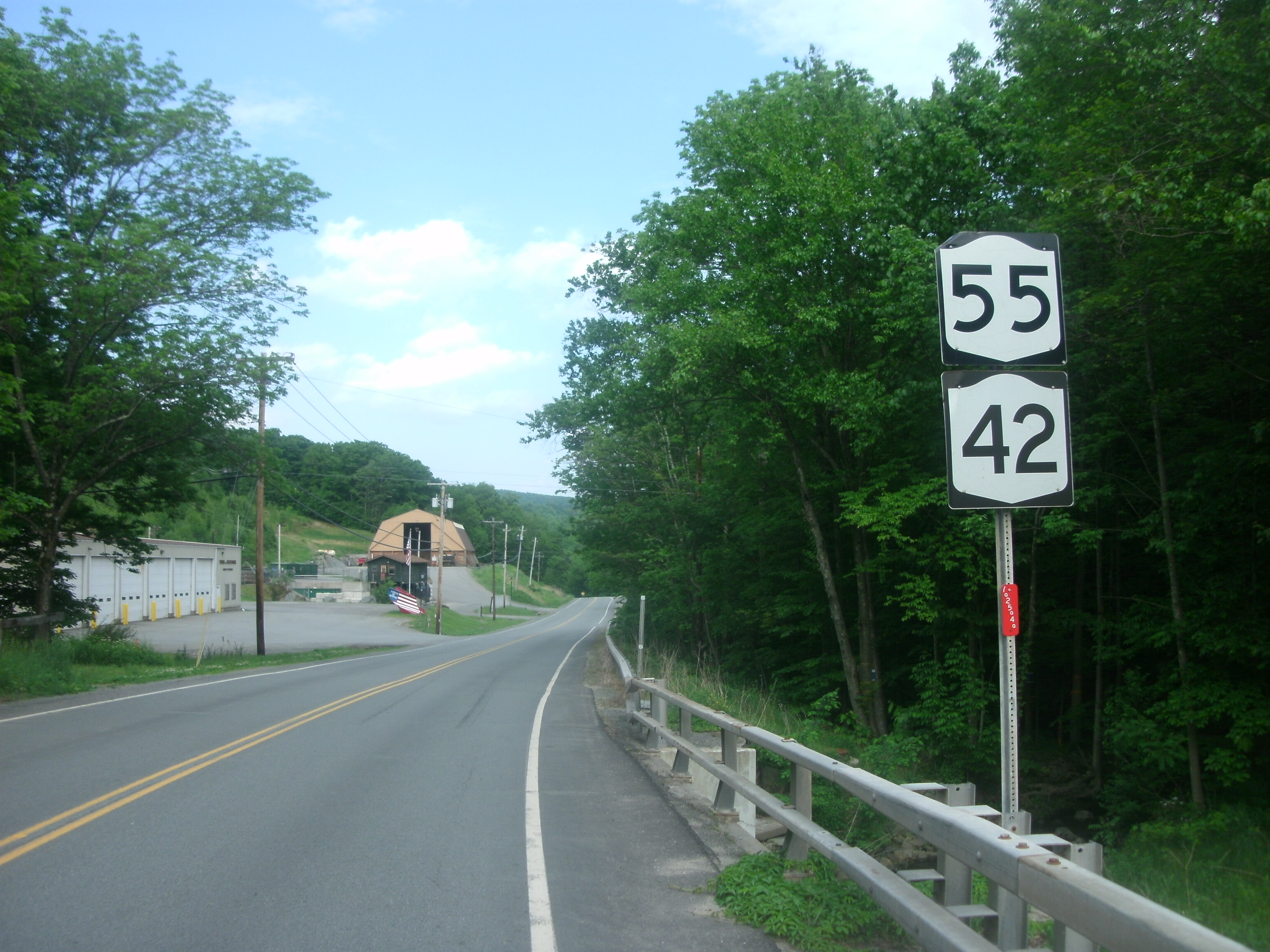
Signage along NY 55 in Curry with a reassurance marker for NY 42, giving the false impression that an overlap still exists between the two routes

After crossing through the small residential hamlet, NY 55 winds southeast, passing the Grahamsville Fairgrounds and changes names to Main Street as the route enters Grahamsville. Bending southeast through Grahamsville, the route crosses past multiple residences and soon the commercial center. At the center of Grahamsville, NY 55 reaches a junction with the northern terminus of the southern segment of NY 42. Continuing eastward out of Grahamsville, the route parallels Chestnut Creek and passing Grahamsville Rural Cemetery. Passing the local high school, NY 55 reaches a junction with the western terminus of NY 55A at the westernmost point of the Rondout Reservoir. NY 55 runs along the southern shore of the Rondout, a two-lane woods road running southeast through the town of Neversink.

Continuing southeast along the reservoir's southern shore, NY 55 passes a lone house looking over the reservoir and reaches the Ulster County line.

=== Ulster County ===
==== Wawarsing to Tuthilltown ====
Now in the town of Wawarsing, NY 55 continues southeast along the southern shore of the Rondout Reservoir. Paralleling the widest points of the reservoir, the route makes a gradual bend to the northeast, leaving the Catskill Forest Preserve. Continuing along the shoreline, the route crosses through the dense woods. At the junction with Porter Road, NY 55 reaches Merriman Dam, the dam that runs the control of water for the Rondout. This junction marks the eastern end of the reservoir, which continues east as Rondout Creek. NY 55 then turns south, reaching a junction with the eastern terminus of NY 55A. Crossing back into the Catskills for a moment, NY 55 soon reaches the hamlet of Lackawack. After a southwestern bend, the route turns southeast and leaves the park for the final time.

Paralleling Rondout Creek, NY 55 crosses past multiple residences in Wawarsing, soon bending eastward past Bennett Road. Paralleling Sportsman Road, NY 55 turns southeast along the Rondout, soon reaching the hamlet of Honk Hill. Through Honk Hill, NY 55 turns south again, passing Honk Lake, where it turns southwest out of the hamlet. Turning southeast again, the route crosses over Rondout Creek again, reaching the hamlet of Napanoch. Through Napanoch, NY 55 is a two-lane residential street, soon turning south along Rondout Creek into a junction with US 209. At the junction with US 209, NY 55 becomes concurrent with the U.S. route northeast through Wawarsing, bypassing the hamlet of Napanoch and crossing a junction with CR 128 (Plank Road / Institution Road). CR 128 connects to two local New York State Department of Corrections facilities.

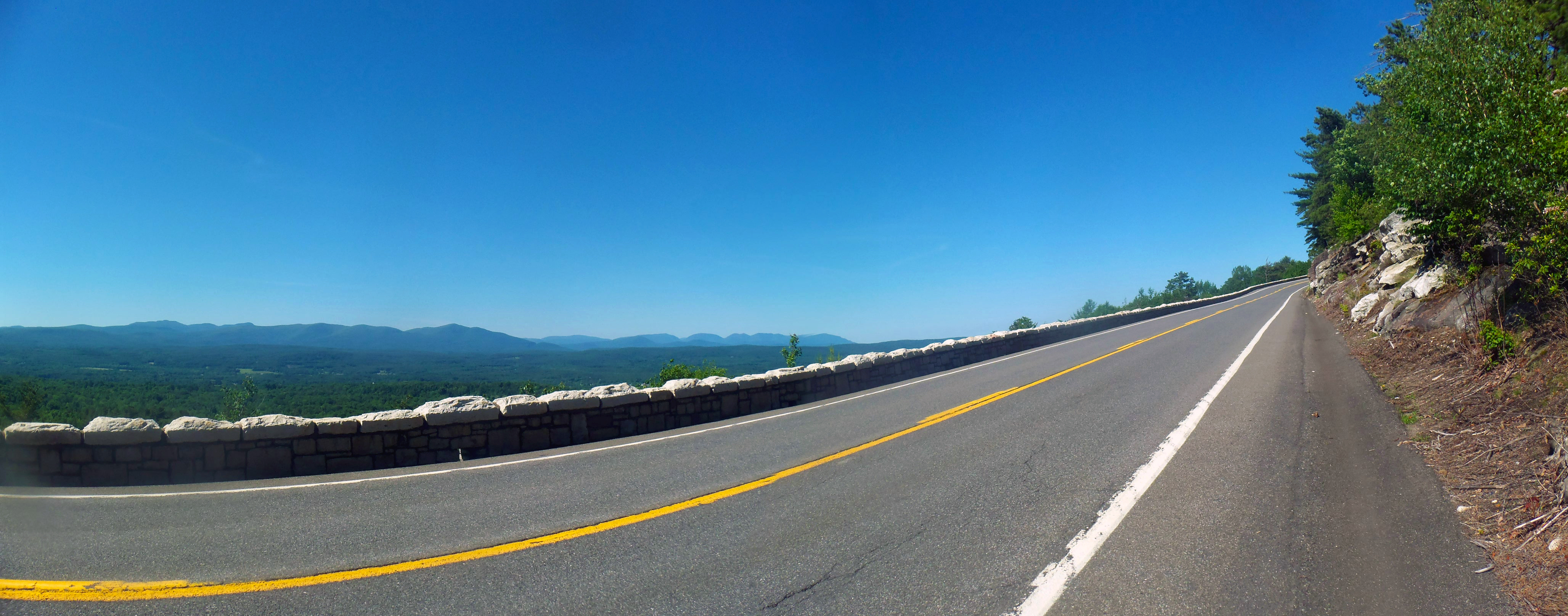
View of Catskills from Routes 44/55 in Shawangunks

US 209 and NY 55 continue north through the hamlet of East Wawarsing, passing multiple old alignments of US 209 through the hamlet of Wawarsing. Winding northeast, US 209 and NY 55 pass multiple residential areas before reaching a more rural section of the town, paralleling Rondout Creek eastward into the hamlet of Kerhonkson. In Kerhonkson, US 209 and NY 55 reach a junction with the western terminus of US 44. At this junction, NY 55 turns east on a concurrency with US 44, crossing over Rondout Creek once again. US 44 and NY 55 wind eastward through Wawarsing, reaching a junction with the southern end of CR 77.

Crossing southeast into the town of Rochester, US 44 and NY 55 reach a junction with CR 27 (Upper Granite Road), where the routes turn south along or near the town line. The routes soon make a gradual bend to the northeast, crossing multiple residences as the route enters the Minnewaska State Park Preserve. Crossing through the dense woods of the park, US 44 and NY 55 continue eastward, southward and southeastward past multiple entrances to sections of the park, crossing a junction with Milbrook Mountain Road, where the routes soon reach the eastern ends of the park. Crossing into the hamlet of Lake Minnewaska, US 44 and NY 55 cross Trapps Road (which connects to the Trapps Bridge), make another southeast to northeast bend and cross a junction with Clove Road.

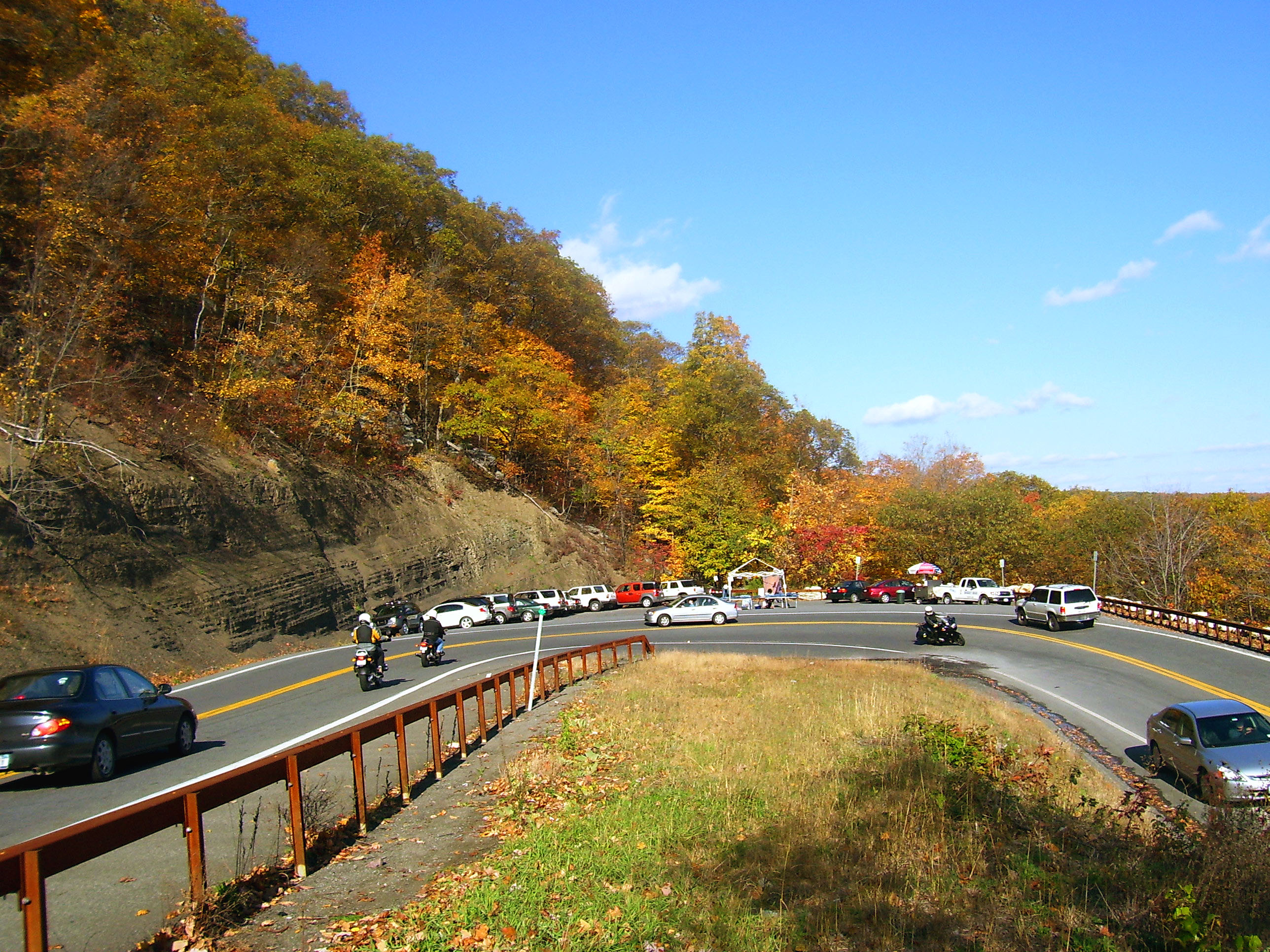
The hairpin turn near the Mohonk Preserve along US 44 and NY 55 in Gardiner

After Clove Road, US 44 and NY 55 become a two-lane road along the slopes of the Shawangunk Mountains, passing a local overlook before reaching the hairpin turn in the town of Gardiner. At this hairpin turn, US 44 and NY 55 turn southwest, winding past multiple homes before turning southeast past a junction with the western terminus of NY 299. Continuing south away from the Shawangunks, the routes cross North Mountain Road and make a bend to the southeast, reaching a junction with CR 7 at the hamlet of Benton Corners. After Benton Corners, US 44 and NY 55 continue southeast through the town of Gardiner, reaching the hamlet of Tuthilltown and a junction with CR 9.

==== Tuthilltown to the Mid-Hudson Bridge ====
Paralleling the Shawangunk Kill, US 44 and NY 55 soon reach the Wallkill River and cross it into the small hamlet of Tuthill. After a short bend to the southeast, the routes enter the hamlet of Gardiner. Now known as Main Street, the routes cross through the center of the hamlet, crossing a junction with CR 19 (Sand Hill Road). Leaving the hamlet of Gardiner, the routes soon reach the hamlet of Ireland Corners, where they meet at a junction with NY 208. East of NY 208, the routes continue east through the rural sections of Gardiner before crossing into the town of Plattekill. Soon after, the routes reach the hamlet of Modena. In Modena, US 44 and NY 55 junction with NY 32 (Main Street) in the center of the hamlet.

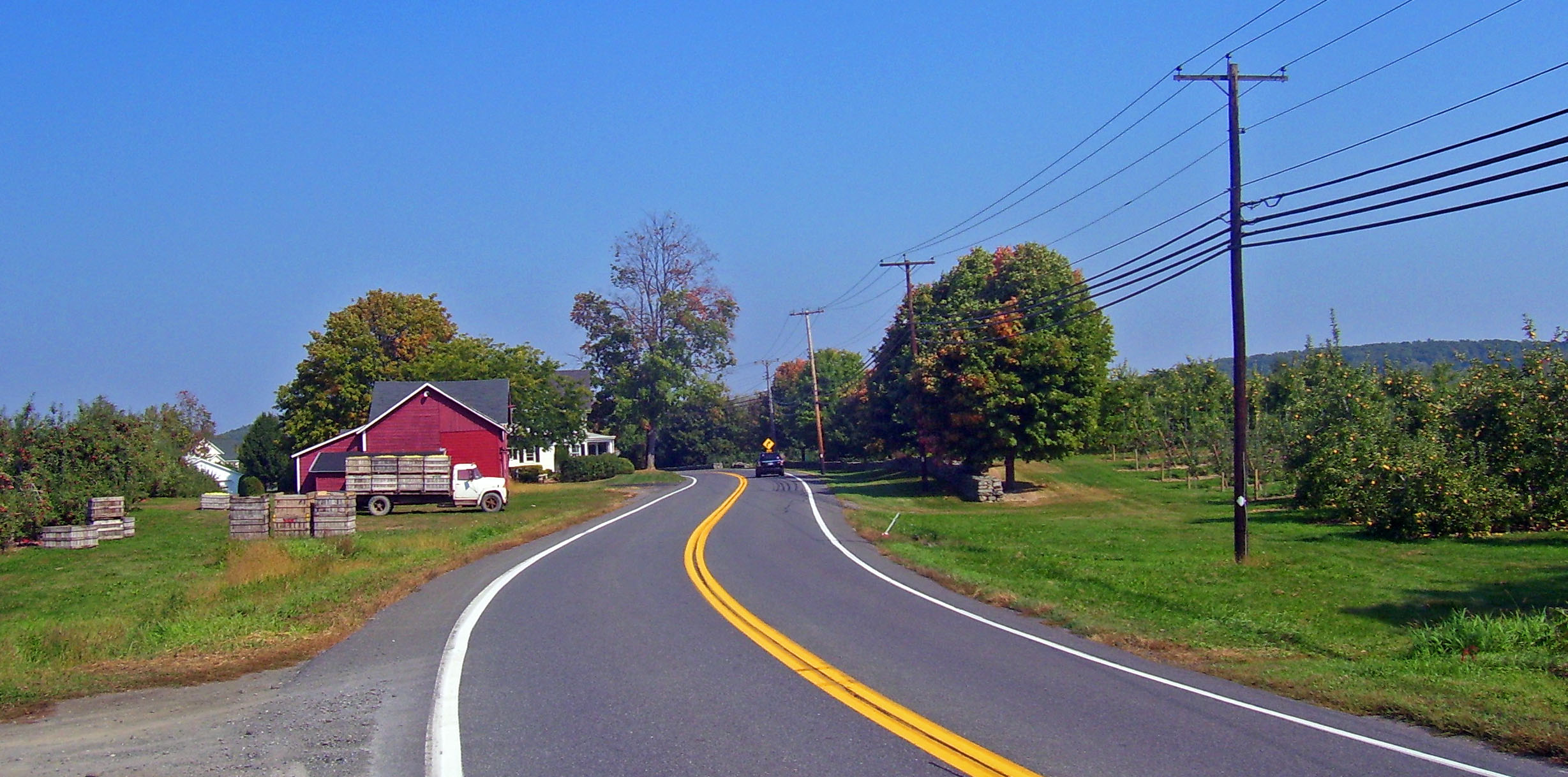
Apple orchards along US 44 and NY 55 between Ardonia and Clintondale

Leaving Modena, US 44 and NY 55 turn northeast through Plattekill, passing multiple residences and cross under the New York State Thruway (I-87). Just east of the Thruway, the routes cross the northern terminus of CR 13 and soon reach the hamlet of Ardonia. At Ardonia, US 44 and NY 55 turn northeast at a junction with CR 10 (Milton Turnpike). North of Ardonia, the routes cross into the town of Lloyd, soon bending eastward into the hamlet of Clintondale. Passing numerous farms west of Clintondale, US 44 and NY 55 cross a junction with CR 22 (South Street) and through the residential hamlet.

The routes soon cross back into the town of Plattekill, passing multiple residences along an eastward stretch near the Pancake Hollow Brook. At the junction with Jenkins Lane, the routes make a dart to the northeast and east, reaching a junction with CR 15 (Tuckers Corners Road). Crossing past several ponds, CR 15 forks off again at the junction with Pancake Hollow Road before US 44 and NY 55 reach the hamlet of Baileys Gap. Just east of Baileys Gap, US 44 and NY 55 cross into the town of Marlborough, reaching a junction with Baileys Gap Road, where they cross back into the town of Lloyd and gain the name Vineyard Avenue. A short distance later, the routes a small residential area and cross a junction with CR 11, which forks off again a short distance later.

US 44 and NY 55 continue north along Vineyard Avenue, passing The Highland Cemetery and entering the hamlet of Highland. Crossing through the commercial center of Highland, the routes cross a junction with CR 12 (Vineyard Avenue). At this junction, US 44 and NY 55 turn south and connect to a junction with US 9W. US 9W, US 44 and NY 55 continue south for a distance concurrent together, passing a junction with Haviland Avenue, which connects to the Walkway over the Hudson before reaching an interchange, where US 44 and NY 55 turn east and become a four-lane freeway. Crossing under a toll gantry, they bend southward before becoming a three-lane undivided road, as they reach the span of the Mid-Hudson Bridge, crossing over the CSX West Shore Railroad.

At the mid-span of the Mid-Hudson Bridge, US 44 and NY 55 cross into Dutchess County and enter the city of Poughkeepsie.

=== Dutchess County ===
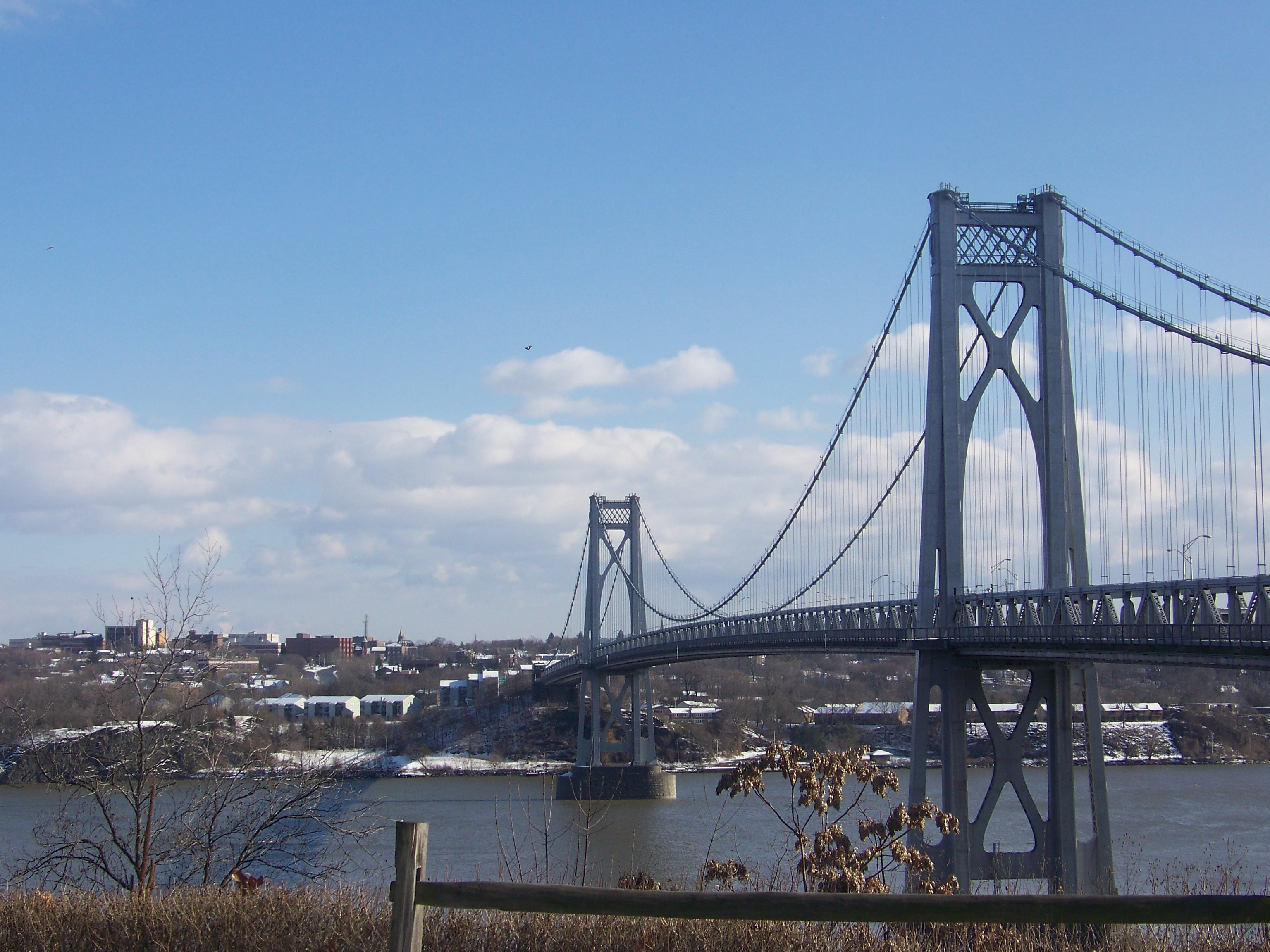
The Mid-Hudson Bridge, viewed from the Ulster County side on the Hudson River

==== Poughkeepsie to Beekman ====
Now in the city of Poughkeepsie, US 44 and NY 55 continue along the Mid-Hudson Bridge across the Hudson River before crossing over Kaal Rock Park into the city. Crossing over the Metro-North Railroad Hudson Line, the routes pass south of the Poughkeepsie station. Just east of the tracks, US 44 and NY 55 cross through an interchange with both directions of US 9 and gain the name of Church Street. Through Poughkeepsie, the routes serve as an arterial road, soon becoming a divided street, with three lanes of US 44 and NY 55 east running along Church Street and three lanes of US 44 and NY 55 west along Mill Street and Columbus Drive with Main Street and much of downtown Poughkeepsie between them. Along Church Street, US 44 and NY 55 cross through the city center, passing multiple city locations, including the Central Business District and the New York State Armory. The westbound US 44 and NY 55 arterial passes other notable locations such as the old Poughkeepsie Almshouse, the current city hall, the Mid-Hudson Civic Center, Poughkeepsie Grand Hotel, and also passes over the Fall Kill.

The eastbound route soon passes south of Reservoir Square Park (with the westbound route passing it on the north) and both directions continue as arterial roads through Poughkeepsie. Just east of May Street, US 44 and NY 55 turn southeast along West Baker Street, crossing multiple residential streets, soon crossing into the Arlington district, located in the Town of Poughkeepsie. The routes cross past the junction with the southern end of NY 115 (Worrall Avenue). Several blocks eastward, the routes soon cross a junction with NY 376 (Raymond Avenue), which terminates just to the north at the westbound lanes. A couple blocks south of the junction on NY 376 is the main campus of Vassar College. Continuing east along Haight Avenue, US 44 and NY 55 soon meet up with the westbound lanes, which also marks the eastern terminus of the concurrency with US 44 as NY 55 forks to the southeast.

NY 55, now a six-lane divided boulevard, runs southeast through the Arlington district, becoming known as Manchester Road. The Burnett Road intersection, just east of the split with US 44, has one of the few jughandles in New York. The route passes north of the Vassar Golf Course before turning east into the town of LaGrange. In the town of LaGrange, the route crosses through the hamlet of Manchester Bridge, where it passes under the Dutchess Rail Trail and then over Wappinger Creek before it junctions with CR 46 (Overlook Road) and CR 49 (Old Manchester Road). The route soon thins out to a two-lane roadway, changing names to Freedom Plains Road as it bends to the southeast and soon east past the other terminus of CR 49 (Titusville Road). NY 55 continues winding eastward through LaGrange, beginning to become more rural, reaching a junction with the southern terminus of CR 47 (Freedom Road).

East of CR 47, the route crosses into the hamlet of Freedom Plains, soon leaving the hamlet for an interchange with the Taconic State Parkway. The route soon crosses over Sprout Creek and becomes a two-lane commercial/rural road through LaGrange, reaching the hamlet of Billings, where it junctions with NY 82. After Billings, NY 55 proceeds southeast through LaGrange, soon reaching the town line and crossing into the town of Union Vale. The route through Union Vale is short, marked mostly by an intersection with CR 21 (East Noxon Road / Bruzgul Road). After CR 21, NY 55 continues southeast through Union Vale, soon reaching the town line again and crossing into the town of Beekman.

NY 55 continues southeast through Beekman, crossing through the rural sections of Dutchess County, soon reaching the hamlet of Poughquag. At Poughquag, NY 55 crosses a junction with CR 9 (Clove Valley Road). Through Poughquag, the route is mainly residential, soon bending southward then southeast along Whaley Lake Stream into a junction with the eastern terminus of NY 216. Just east of that junction, NY 55 meets CR 32 and parallels the Whaley Lake Stream through the town of Beekman. Paralleling an old alignment of itself, NY 55 soon reaches a junction with the northern terminus of NY 292 as it enters the town of Pawling.

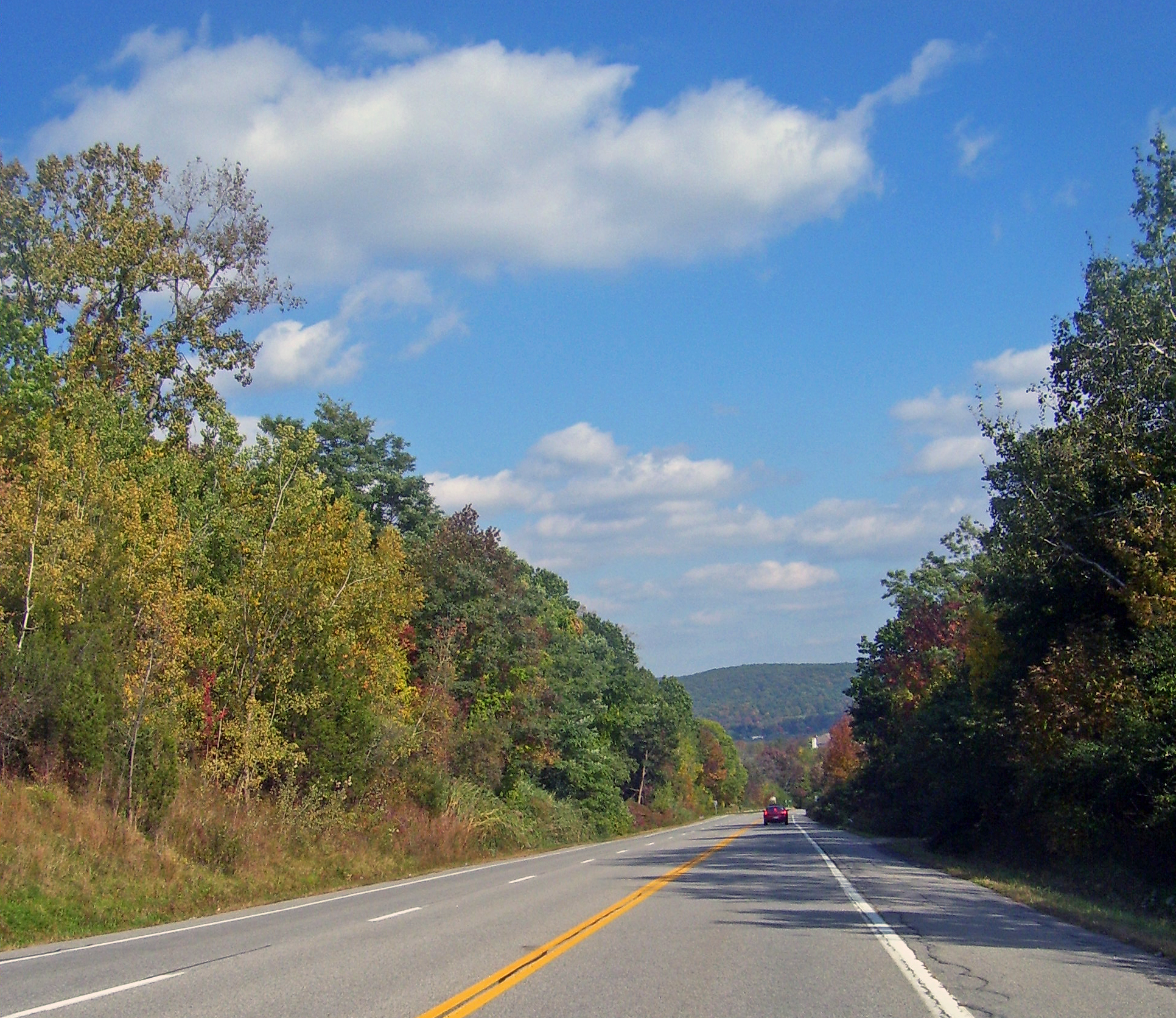
NY 55 approaching the village of Pawling

==== Pawling to Connecticut ====
Now in Pawling, NY 55 continues southeast on a parallel of the Housatonic Railroad and the Whaley Lake Stream, bypassing the hamlet of Woodinville. After making a gradual bend to the southeast and soon to the east, NY 55 becomes more residential as it approaches the village of Pawling. The route soon parallels CR 69, which is disconnected at NY 55. The route then crosses over the East Branch of the Croton River and the Metro-North Railroad Harlem Line, passing south of the Pawling station, which is connected via CR 69. A couple blocks east of the tracks, NY 55 enters a partial cloverleaf interchange with NY 22.

NY 22 and NY 55 become concurrent through the village of Pawling, passing the Dutcher Golf Course and bypassing the center of the village. Passing the Pawling High School at Reservoir Road, NY 22 and NY 55 leave the village of Pawling and continue north through the namesake town. Paralleling the tracks of the Harlem Line, NY 22 and NY 55 cross through the hamlet of Hurd Corners, junction with the western end of CR 68. Just north of CR 68, the routes cross the Appalachian Trail at the site of the Appalachian Trail station. Continuing north through the town of Pawling, the routes parallel the tracks and the Swamp River before crossing into the town of Dover.

Through Dover, NY 22 and NY 55 become a residential two-lane road, passing the Harlem Valley-Wingdale station and the Harlem Valley Golf Club. The routes soon reach the hamlet of Wingdale, where NY 22 forks to the north while NY 55 heads northeast past Thomas J. Boyce Park. Following an old alignment of NY 22, NY 55 soon turns east at a junction with CR 6 in the hamlet of Webatuck. Along the eastern stretch, NY 55 crosses through the dense woods of Webatuck and pass a junction with the southern terminus of CR 22 (Dogtail Corners Road).

After CR 22, NY 55 turns to the southeast at Old Forge Road, passing Duell Hollow Brook and turning eastward after crossing the brook. Just after the junction with Hoyt Road, NY 55 makes a turn to the northeast and crosses the state line into Connecticut. The route continues east as CT 55, connecting to US 7 at Gaylordsville, Connecticut.

== History ==
=== Origins ===
The portion of modern NY 55 in Ulster County from the intersection with CR 7 west of Gardiner to U.S. Route 9W (US 9W) follows the Farmers' Turnpike, which was built by the Farmer's Turnpike & Bridge Company, a private company established in March 1808. Its purpose was to allow the transport of agricultural products from the Gardiner area to docks on the Hudson River at Milton. The route at that time followed the north end of Albany Post Road (CR 9) over the Shawangunk Kill and then east along the kill's south bank to ford the Wallkill River just south of the confluence. The turnpike company eventually went bankrupt.

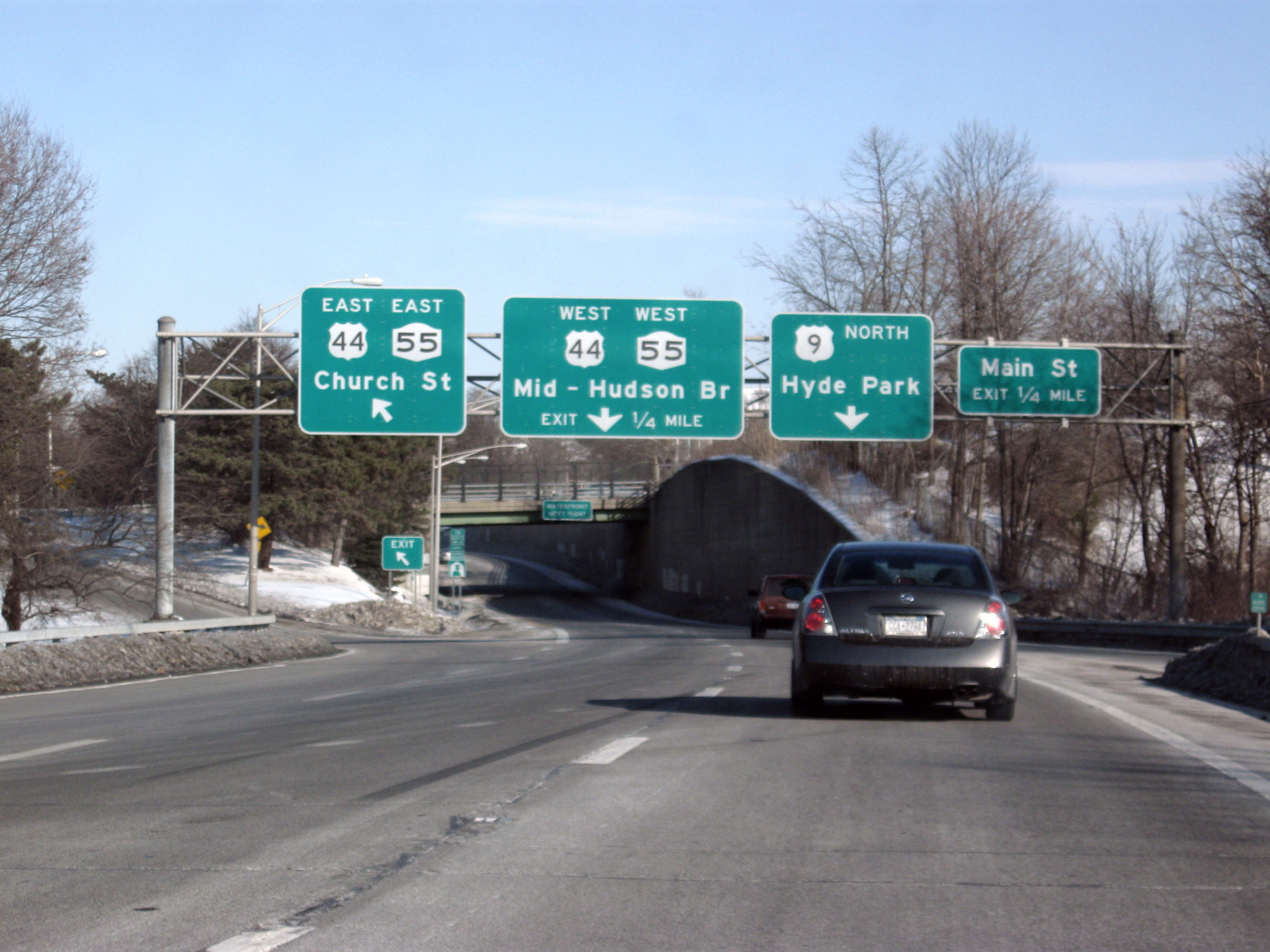
The exit for US 44/NY 55 for the Mid-Hudson Bridge from US 9.

In the early 1910s, the state of New York improved the former turnpike to state highway standards at a cost of just over $172,868 (equivalent to $4.02 million in 2024). The section from the Plattekill–Lloyd town line north of Ardonia to what is now US 9W was added to the state highway system on September 9, 1911, as State Highway 350 (SH 350) while the portion from modern CR 7 to the west end of SH 350 was accepted into the state highway system on October 20, 1913, as SH 351. Both designations were assigned by the New York State Legislature for inventory purposes and were unsigned.

In 1908, the legislature created a statewide system of unsigned legislative routes. No designation was assigned to most of the modern NY 55 corridor; however, the section of highway that NY 55 now shares with NY 22 from Pawling to Wingdale was designated as part of Route 1, a route extending from New York City to Albany. On March 1, 1921, the segment of NY 55 that overlaps with US 209 in Wawarsing was included in Route 40, a new route that generally followed the modern US 209 corridor between Port Jervis and Kingston.

=== Designation ===
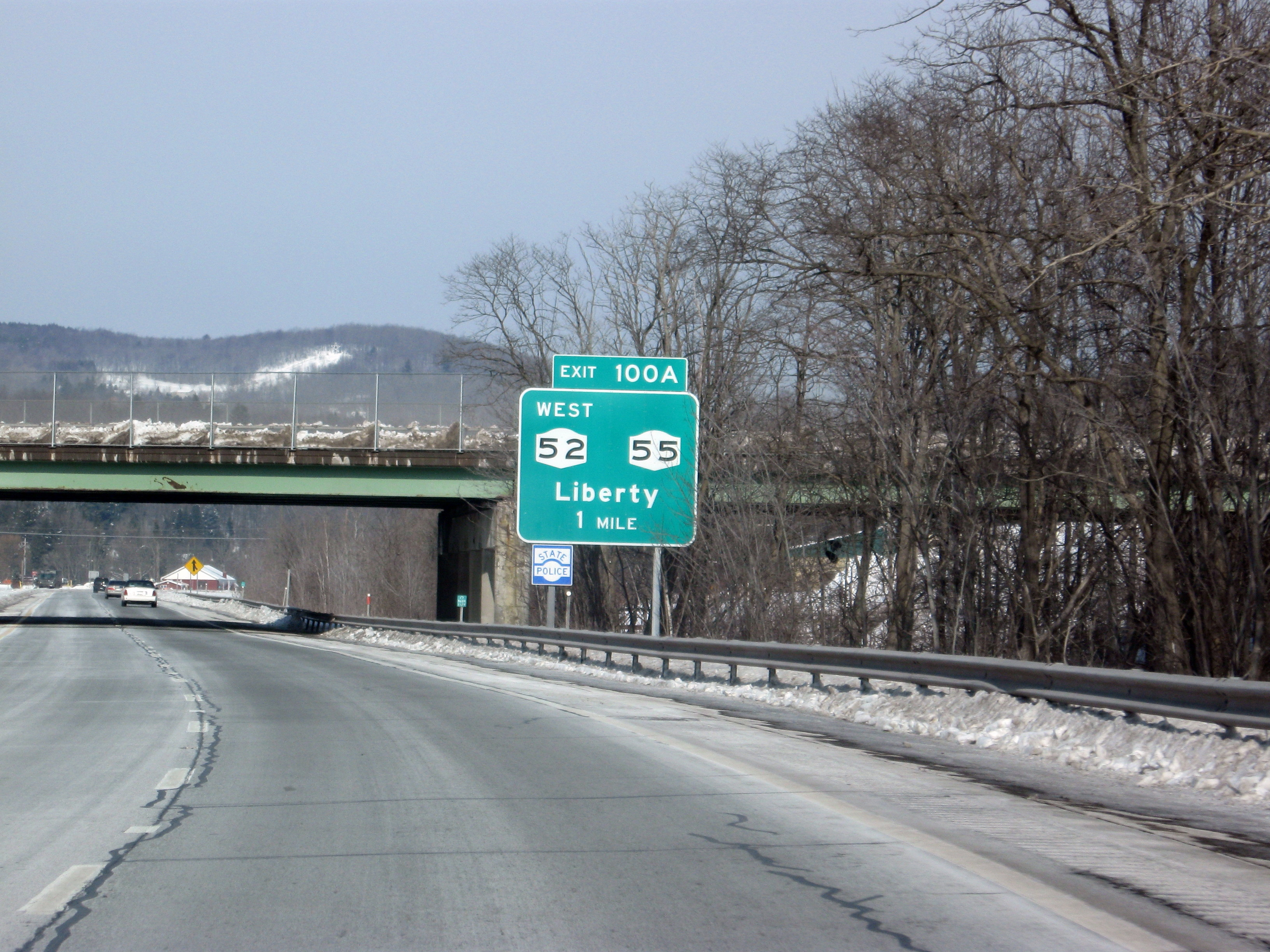
NY 55's westbound exit from NY 17, merged with NY 52.

When the first set of posted routes in New York were assigned in 1924, much of legislative Route 1—including from Pawling to Wingdale—was designated as part of NY 22. By 1926, all of legislative Route 40 was designated as NY 50 while a small portion of modern NY 55 between what is now NY 216 and NY 292 near Poughquag was signed as part of NY 39. NY 50 became part of US 6 in 1927. Over the next eight years, the highway went through several designations, becoming US 6N in 1928, NY 279 in 1933 and US 209 c. 1935.

NY 39 was reassigned to another highway in western New York in the 1930 renumbering of state highways in New York. At the same time, NY 55 was assigned to much of its current alignment between Barryville and Pawling, utilizing the old Farmers' Turnpike in eastern Ulster County and a series of previously unnumbered roads in Sullivan, western Ulster, and Dutchess counties. From Poughquag to West Pawling, NY 55 overlapped with NY 52, which replaced NY 39 east of East Fishkill. Initially, NY 55 continued east from Pawling to the Connecticut state line at Sherman via Quaker Hill and Kirby Hill roads.

In the early 1930s, the modern routing of NY 55 between Wingdale and the Connecticut border was designated as NY 341. The alignments of NY 55 and NY 341 east of NY 22 were flipped c. 1934, placing NY 55 on its current alignment and NY 341 on NY 55's old routing. NY 55 reached Wingdale by way of a 7-mile (11 km) overlap with NY 22. When NY 55 was first assigned, it was routed along the northern bank of Rondout Creek between the hamlets of Grahamsville and Lackawack. In the mid-1940s, NY 55 was realigned to follow a new highway along the southern bank while its former routing to the north became NY 55A. Both changes were made in order to accommodate the Rondout Reservoir, which was created c. 1950 following the construction of the Merriman Dam.

=== Recent construction ===
The steel truss bridge located near the eastern side of the Rondout Reservoir and the junction with NY 55A was rehabilitated in 2010. The existing reinforced concrete deck was removed, shear studs were installed (there were no shear studs on the steel beams previously), and a new reinforced concrete deck was installed. The reinforced concrete piers were also repaired with concrete after sounding inspections. Care was taken not to introduce concrete debris into the Rondout Creek during concrete removal. The southern portion of NY 55 around the Rondout Reservoir was closed during this period.

== Major intersections ==
County	Location	mi	km	Destinations	Notes
Sullivan	Town of Highland	0.00	0.00	NY 97 / PA 434 south – Narrowsburg, Port Jervis, Pennsylvania	Western terminus; northern terminus of PA 434; access to PA 434 via Barryville–Shohola Bridge; hamlet of Barryville
Sullivan	Town of Bethel	15.19	24.45	NY 17B west – Fosterdale	Western end of NY 17B concurrency
Sullivan	Town of Bethel	15.87	25.54	NY 17B east – Monticello	Eastern end of NY 17B concurrency; hamlet of White Lake
Sullivan	Village of Liberty	26.45	42.57	NY 52 west (South Main Street)	Western end of NY 52 concurrency
Sullivan	Village of Liberty	26.67	42.92	NY 52 east to NY 17 – Ellenville	Roundabout; eastern end of NY 52 concurrency
Sullivan	Village of Liberty	27.07– 27.17	43.56– 43.73	Future I-86 east / NY 17 east – New York City	Westbound exit and eastbound entrance; exit 100A on NY 17; partial diamond interchange
Sullivan	Town of Neversink	39.61	63.75	NY 42 south – Woodbourne	Northern terminus of NY 42; hamlet of Grahamsville
Sullivan	Town of Neversink	40.25	64.78	NY 55A east – Sundown	Western terminus of NY 55A
Ulster	Town of Wawarsing	48.75	78.46	NY 55A west	Eastern terminus of NY 55A
Ulster	Town of Wawarsing	54.06	87.00	US 209 south – Ellenville	Western end of US 209 concurrency; hamlet of Napanoch
Ulster	Town of Wawarsing	58.44	94.05	US 209 north – Kerhonkson, Kingston US 44 begins	Eastern end of US 209 concurrency; western terminus of US 44
Ulster	Town of Gardiner	68.86	110.82	NY 299 east to I-87 / New York Thruway – New Paltz	Western terminus of NY 299
Ulster	Town of Gardiner	74.74	120.28	NY 208 – New Paltz, Wallkill	Hamlet of Ireland Corners
Ulster	Town of Plattekill	76.20	122.63	NY 32 to I-87 / New York Thruway – New Paltz, Plattekill	Hamlet of Modena
Ulster	Town of Lloyd	86.12	138.60	US 9W north to I-87 / New York Thruway – Kingston	Western end of US 9W concurrency; hamlet of Highland
Ulster	Town of Lloyd	86.68	139.50	US 9W south – Newburgh	Trumpet interchange; eastern end of US 9W concurrency; last eastbound exit before toll
Hudson River		88.35	142.19	Franklin D. Roosevelt Mid-Hudson Bridge (eastbound toll gantry)	
Dutchess	City of Poughkeepsie	88.93	143.12	US 9 to I-84 – Wappingers Falls, Hyde Park	Interchange
Dutchess	City of Poughkeepsie	90.49	145.63	NY 115 north (Worrall Avenue) to CR 75	Southern terminus of NY 115
Dutchess	Town of Poughkeepsie	90.90	146.29	NY 376 south (Raymond Avenue)	Northern terminus of NY 376; hamlet of Arlington
Dutchess	Town of Poughkeepsie	91.16	146.71	US 44 east – Millbrook	Interchange; eastbound exit and westbound entrance; eastern end of US 44 concurrency
Dutchess	Town of LaGrange	97.41	156.77	Taconic State Parkway – New York City, Albany	Exit 47 on Taconic State Parkway; cloverleaf interchange; hamlet of Freedom Plains
Dutchess	Town of LaGrange	98.72	158.87	NY 82 – Millbrook, Hopewell Junction	Hamlet of Billings
Dutchess	Town of Beekman	105.51	169.80	NY 216 west – Stormville	Eastern terminus of NY 216; hamlet of Poughquag
Dutchess	Town of Pawling	107.17	172.47	NY 292 south – Holmes, Whaley Lake	Northern terminus of NY 292; hamlet of West Pawling
Dutchess	Town of Pawling	112.30	180.73	NY 22 south to I-684 / I-84 – Brewster	Trumpet interchange; western end of NY 22 concurrency
Dutchess	Town of Dover	119.18	191.80	NY 22 north – Dover Plains	Eastern end of NY 22 concurrency; hamlet of Wingdale
Dutchess	Town of Dover	119.43	192.20	To NY 22 north – Dover Plains	Access via Pleasant Ridge Road; hamlet of Wingdale
Dutchess	Town of Dover	122.45	197.06	Route 55 east – New Milford, Kent, Danbury	Continuation into Connecticut
1.000 mi = 1.609 km; 1.000 km = 0.621 mi: Concurrency terminus; Electronic toll collection; Incomplete access

== State Route 55A ==
New York State Route 55A
- Location: Neversink–Wawarsing

State Route 55A (NY 55A) is an alternate route of NY 55 along the north side of the Rondout Reservoir between Grahamsville and Napanoch. It was assigned in the mid-1940s.
