= Pleasant Valley (CDP), New York =

Pleasant Valley, New York
- Census-designated place
- Location of Pleasant Valley, New York
- Coordinates: 41°44′43″N 73°49′24″W
- Country: United States
- State: New York
- County: Dutchess
- Town: Pleasant Valley

Area
  - Total: 1.11 sq mi (2.87 km^{2})
  - Land: 1.08 sq mi (2.81 km^{2})
  - Water: 0.023 sq mi (0.06 km^{2})
- Elevation: 187 ft (57 m)

Population (2020)
  - Total: 1,603
  - Density: 1,477.6/sq mi (570.49/km^{2})
- Time zone: UTC-5 (Eastern (EST))
  - Summer (DST): UTC-4 (EDT)
- ZIP code: 12569
- Area code: 845
- FIPS code: 36-58684
- GNIS feature ID: 0960718
- Website: www.pleasantvalley-ny.gov

Pleasant Valley is a census-designated place (CDP) in the southwestern part of the town of Pleasant Valley in Dutchess County, New York, United States. The population was 1,145 at the 2010 census. It is part of the Kiryas Joel–Poughkeepsie–Newburgh, NY Metropolitan Statistical Area as well as the larger New York–Newark–Bridgeport, NY-NJ-CT-PA Combined Statistical Area.

== Geography ==
Pleasant Valley CDP is located in the southwestern part of the town of Pleasant Valley at 41°44′42″N 73°49′24″W (41.745205, -73.823395). Wappinger Creek, a tributary of the Hudson River, flows through the center of the community.

U.S. Route 44 passes through the CDP as Main Street and leads southwest 7 miles (11 km) to Poughkeepsie and northeast 8 miles (13 km) to Millbrook.

According to the United States Census Bureau, the Pleasant Valley CDP has a total area of 0.96 square miles (2.48 km^{2}), of which 0.93 square miles (2.42 km^{2}) is land and 0.02 square miles (0.06 km^{2}), or 2.56%, is water.

== Demographics ==
Historical population
Census	Pop.	Note	%±
2020	1,603		—
U.S. Decennial Census

As of the census of 2000, there were 1,839 people, 753 households, and 502 families residing in the CDP. The population density was 1,172.7 inhabitants per square mile (452.8/km^{2}). There were 775 housing units at an average density of 494.2 per square mile (190.8/km^{2}). The racial makeup of the CDP was 94.13% White, 3.15% Black or African American, 0.05% Native American, 1.09% Asian, 0.05% Pacific Islander, 0.82% from other races, and 0.71% from two or more races. Hispanic or Latino of any race were 2.61% of the population.

There were 753 households, out of which 33.9% had children under the age of 18 living with them, 55.1% were married couples living together, 7.3% had a female householder with no husband present, and 33.3% were non-families. 27.8% of all households were made up of individuals, and 10.2% had someone living alone who was 65 years of age or older. The average household size was 2.44 and the average family size was 3.00.

In the CDP, the population was spread out, with 24.5% under the age of 18, 6.0% from 18 to 24, 31.7% from 25 to 44, 24.6% from 45 to 64, and 13.2% who were 65 years of age or older. The median age was 38 years. For every 100 females, there were 94.2 males. For every 100 females age 18 and over, there were 95.2 males.

The median income for a household in the CDP was $50,353, and the median income for a family was $57,888. Males had a median income of $41,992 versus $32,436 for females. The per capita income for the CDP was $24,598. About 2.7% of families and 2.7% of the population were below the poverty line, including 1.0% of those under age 18 and none of those age 65 or over.

== Education ==
It is in the Arlington Central School District, which operates Arlington High School.
