= Pleasant Valley (town), New York =

Pleasant Valley, New York
- Town
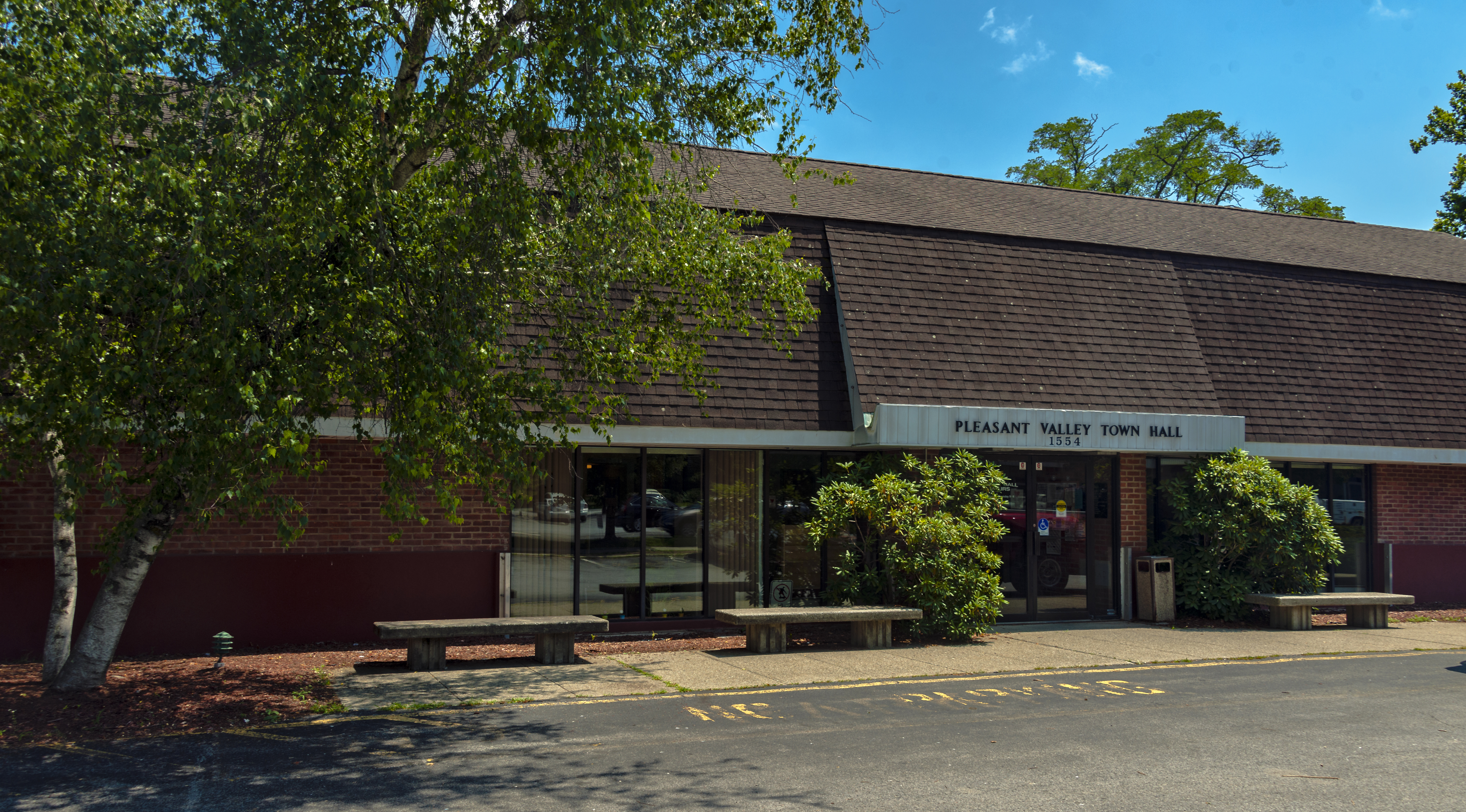
- Town hall

- Location of Pleasant Valley, New York
- Coordinates: 41°44′39″N 73°49′28″W
- Country: United States
- State: New York
- County: Dutchess

Government
  - Type: Town Council
  - Town Supervisor: Mary Albrecht (R)
  - Town Council: Scott Cookingham (R) Jennifer Chapman (R); Dan Degan (WOR) Michael Rifenburgh (R)

Area
  - Total: 33.14 sq mi (85.83 km^{2})
  - Land: 32.58 sq mi (84.37 km^{2})
  - Water: 0.56 sq mi (1.46 km^{2})
- Elevation: 211 ft (64 m)

Population (2020)
  - Total: 9,799
- Time zone: Eastern (EST)
- ZIP Codes: 12569 (Pleasant Valley); 12578 (Salt Point); 12538 (Hyde Park); 12545 (Millbrook); 12601, 12603 (Poughkeepsie)
- Area code: 845
- FIPS code: 36-027-58695
- GNIS feature ID: 979378
- Website: pleasantvalley-ny.gov

Pleasant Valley is a town in Dutchess County, within the Hudson Valley of New York, United States. The population was 9,799 at the 2020 census. The town is centrally located in the county, northeast of the city of Poughkeepsie. U.S. Route 44 passes through the town.

== History ==
Settlers began arriving after 1735. The town was part of the Great Nine Partners Patent of 1697. The town was formed in 1821 from part of the town of Clinton.

== Notable people ==
- Blythe Auffarth, actress
- Julia Dean (1830–1868), stage actress, originally from Pleasant Valley
- Jacob R. Evertson (1734–1807), delegate to the Second New York Provincial Congress 1774-1775 and Deputy 1776, and father in law of John Cotton Smith, the First Governor of Connecticut. Buried in Pleasant Valley Presbyterian Churchyard.
- Thomas T. Flagler, US congressman
- Jackson Kemper (1789–1870), the first missionary bishop of the Episcopal Church in the United States of America, born in Pleasant Valley
- Irene McGee, cast member of The Real World: Seattle
- Tony Romeo, songwriter who wrote "Indian Lake" by The Cowsills, and "I Think I Love You" by The Partridge Family; lived in Pleasant Valley from 1980 to 1995, when he died at age 56
- Thomas R. Sherwood, Chief Justice of the Michigan Supreme Court
- Melancton Smith, delegate to the ratification of the U.S. Constitution
- Jeffrey Wigand, former vice president of research and development at Brown & Williamson
- James Kirke Paulding, born in Pleasant Valley a former United States Secretary of the Navy, an American writer and childhood friend of Washington Irving
- Carson Robison (1890–1957), early country and western music and radio performer

== Geography ==
According to the United States Census Bureau, the town has a total area of 33.1 square miles (85.8 km^{2}), of which 32.6 square miles (84.4 km^{2}) is land and 0.58 square miles (1.5 km^{2}), or 1.7%, is water.

=== Major roads ===
A section of U.S. Route 44 goes through the town in a southwestern-northeastern direction. It intersects with the Taconic State Parkway, a north–south highway, in the northern part of the town.

== Demographics ==
Historical population
Census	Pop.	Note	%±
1830	2,419		—
1840	2,219		−8.3%
1850	2,226		0.3%
1860	2,343		5.3%
1870	1,963		−16.2%
1880	1,785		−9.1%
1890	1,531		−14.2%
1900	1,483		−3.1%
1910	1,358		−8.4%
1920	1,160		−14.6%
1930	1,520		31.0%
1940	2,061		35.6%
1950	2,751		33.5%
1960	4,046		47.1%
1970	6,021		48.8%
1980	6,892		14.5%
1990	8,063		17.0%
2000	9,066		12.4%
2010	9,672		6.7%
2020	9,799		1.3%
U.S. Decennial Census

As of the census of 2000, there were 9,066 people, 3,467 households, and 2,485 families residing in the town. The population density was 275.4 inhabitants per square mile (106.3/km^{2}). There were 3,614 housing units at an average density of 109.8 per square mile (42.4/km^{2}). The racial makeup of the town was 95.46% white, 1.93% black or African American, .12% Native American, .64% Asian, .02% Pacific Islander, .83% from other races, and 1% from two or more races. Hispanic or Latino of any race were 2.65% of the population.

There were 3,467 households, out of which 35.7% had children under the age of 18 living with them, 58.9% were married couples living together, 8.7% had a female householder with no husband present, and 28.3% were non-families. 23.2% of all households were made up of individuals, and 7.9% had someone living alone who was 65 years of age or older. The average household size was 2.61 and the average family size was 3.09.

In the town, the population was spread out, with 26.1% under the age of 18, 6.4% from 18 to 24, 30.6% from 25 to 44, 26.2% from 45 to 64, and 10.6% who were 65 years of age or older. The median age was 38 years. For every 100 females, there were 97.6 males. For every 100 females age 18 and over, there were 95.1 males.

The median income for a household in the town was $54,578, and the median income for a family was $62,264. Males had a median income of $47,647 versus $31,496 for females. The per capita income for the town was $25,942. About 3.9% of families and 5.6% of the population were below the poverty line, including 6.6% of those under age 18 and 6.2% of those age 65 or over.

== Library ==
The Pleasant Valley Free Library was founded in 1903, and originally operated under State Charter and was governed by five trustees. The library has moved locations twice, the first time after it burned in 1913, and the second in 1974, where it remains currently. The library offers adult, young adult, and children's materials in the form of books, audiobooks, music CDs, and DVDs. There are eight public computers available for use, as well as two public computers in the young adult area. Additionally, the library offers services such as printing, faxing, photocopying, and tech help. Digital services offered by the library include Overdrive, Inc., Hoopla, and NovelNY, among others.

The library's programming includes book discussion groups, children's storytimes, in-depth tech help, and yoga.

=== 2018 Fire ===
On November 6, 2018, an electrical fire started in the basement of the library and spread through the walls to the upper floor. It was estimated that the library lost about 52,000 items in the collection, primarily due to smoke damage, though in the year after the fire, the library acquired 30,000 items mostly through donations. The historic building, built in the 1870s, required about $3 million to rebuild and expand, and finally reopened in early February 2022.

=== Board of trustees ===
The Pleasant Valley Free Library Board of Trustees currently has 12 members, though it can have up to 13, and the Board meets on the third Thursday of each month.

== Communities and locations in Pleasant Valley ==
- Bloomvale – a former mill hamlet north of Washington Hollow, at Route 82 and Clinton Corners Road.
- Clark Heights – a location southwest of Pleasant Valley hamlet on Route 44.
- Gretna – a location in the western part of the town.
- Netherwood – a location southwest of Salt Point.
- Pleasant Valley – the hamlet and census-designated place of Pleasant Valley is in the southwestern part of the town, on Route 44. It was formerly called "Charlotte."
- Salt Point – a hamlet near the northeastern town line.
- Timothy Heights – a location south of Pleasant Valley hamlet on Route 44.
- Valleydale – a development southeast of Pleasant Valley off Traver Road.
- Washington Hollow – a hamlet near the eastern town line. It is the former location of the Dutchess County Fair.
