= Connecticut Route 361 =

State highway in Litchfield County, Connecticut, US

Route 361

Route information
- Maintained by CTDOT
- Length: 3.54 mi (5.70 km)
- Existed: 1966–present

Major junctions
- South end: Route 41 in Sharon
- North end: CR 62 at the New York state line near Millerton, NY

Location
- Country: United States
- State: Connecticut
- Counties: Litchfield

Highway system
- Connecticut State Highway System; Interstate; US; State; SSR; SR; Scenic
← Route 354	→ Route 364

Route 361 is a state highway in the northwestern section of the U.S. state of Connecticut, running from the town center of Sharon to the New York state line in Salisbury. The route was a former alignment of Route 4 from what is now Route 41 to the New York state line, where it continued as New York State Route 361. Route 361 in Connecticut was assigned when Route 4 was truncated in 1966. In 1980, New York decommissioned the continuation of Route 361 and reassigned it as Dutchess County Route 62.

== Route description ==
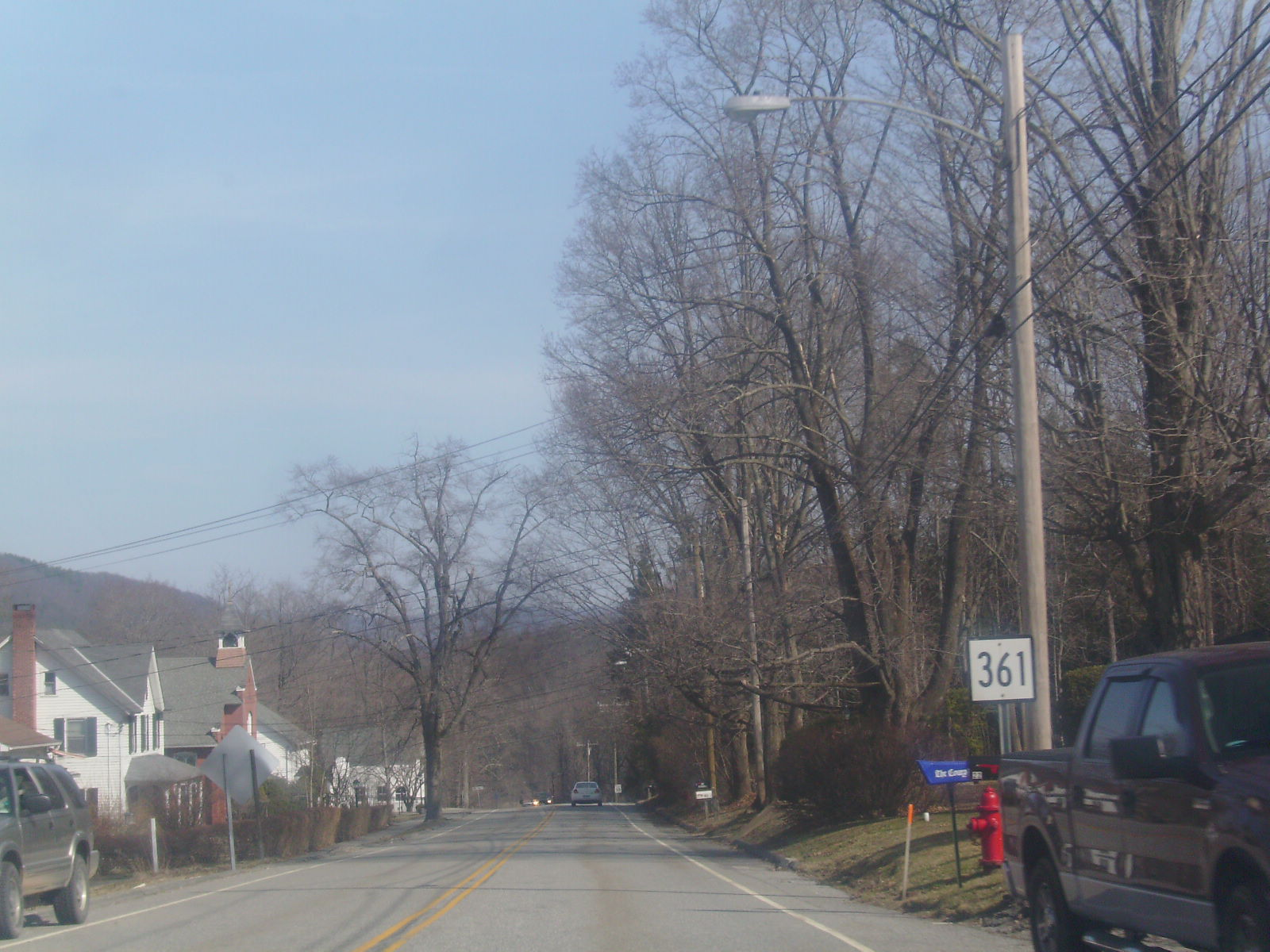
Route 361 heading westbound through Sharon on Millerton Road

Route 361 begins in the town center of Sharon, at an intersection with Route 41 (Gay Street) near Hillside Cemetery. It proceeds west on West Main Street then turns north on New Street, which later becomes Millerton Road. Millerton Road heads north and northwest through woodlands to the south of Mudge Pond. After intersecting with Mudge Pond Road, a local road running along the western shore of Mudge Pond, Route 361 turns west until it intersects Sharon Valley Road. At this intersection, Route 361 turns north, still following Millerton Road.

Route 361 continues north through woodlands with several residences following the western edge of Indian Mountain. Near the southern edge of Indian Lake, a bi-state body of water, the route intersects with Dakin Road, which heads west to the state line becoming Taylor Road, then continues north along the eastern edge of the lake, where several more residences are located. The highway turns northwest with the lake shore, passing by woodlands and residences, along with two unnamed driveways to local residences. There is also a cut in the nearby woodlands to the north. The road enters the town limits of Salisbury just before ending at the New York–Connecticut state line. On the New York side, Dutchess County Route 62 (Sharon Road) continues towards the village of Millerton.

== History ==
Route 361 was originally an alignment of Route 4 from Route 41 (and formerly U.S. Route 7) to the state line, where it continued as New York State Route 361 to the village of Millerton and U.S. Route 44. In 1966, the Connecticut Department of Transportation decided to truncate Route 4 from the state line back to Sharon, and renumbered the stretch as Route 361 to match up at the state line. In 1980, the New York State Department of Transportation decommissioned their alignment of Route 361 and turned it over to Dutchess County, which designated it as County Route 62.

== Major intersections ==
The entire route is in Litchfield County.

Location	mi	km	Destinations	Notes
Sharon	0.00	0.00	Route 41 – Lakeville, Amenia Union	Southern terminus
Salisbury	3.54	5.70	CR 62 north – Millerton	Continuation into New York; former NY 361
1.000 mi = 1.609 km; 1.000 km = 0.621 mi
