= Clinton, Dutchess County, New York =

Clinton, New York
- Town
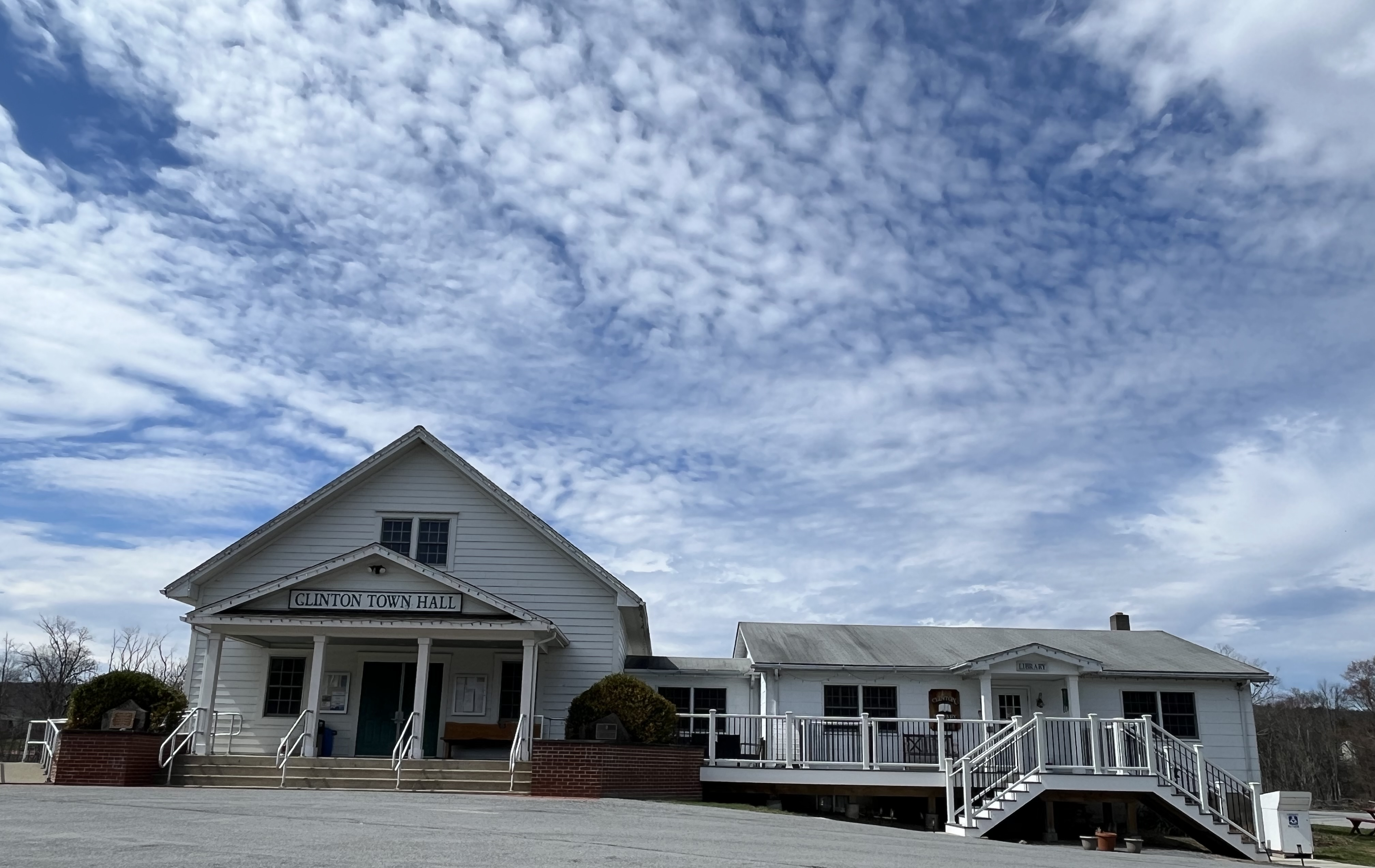
- Clinton Town Hall and Clinton Library

- Location of Clinton, New York
- Coordinates: 41°51′N 73°49′W
- Country: United States
- State: New York
- County: Dutchess

Government
  - Type: Town Council
  - Town Supervisor: Michael Whitton (D)
  - Town Council: Members' List: • Eliot Werner (D); • Marion Auspitz (D); • Charles Dykas (D); • Katherine Mustello (R)

Area
  - Total: 38.8 sq mi (100.5 km^{2})
  - Land: 38.1 sq mi (98.8 km^{2})
  - Water: 0.66 sq mi (1.7 km^{2})
- Elevation: 390 ft (120 m)

Population (2020)
  - Total: 4,037
- Time zone: UTC-5 (Eastern (EST))
  - Summer (DST): UTC-4 (EDT)
- ZIP Codes: 12514 (Clinton Corners); 12538 (Hyde Park); 12572 (Rhinebeck); 12578 (Salt Point); 12580 (Staatsburg)
- FIPS code: 36-16408
- GNIS feature ID: 0978841
- Website: www.clintondcny.gov

Clinton is a town in Dutchess County, New York, United States. The population was 4,037 in the 2020 census, down from 4,312 in the 2010 census.

== History ==
The current boundaries of the town of Clinton were set in 1821. The general area was part of a British land grant in 1697 known as the Great Nine Partners Patent. In 1734, a soil survey was done in the Great Nine Partners patent running in 1 1/2 mile wide strips from the Hudson River east through the patent. The particular strip running at the bottom of the patent including the future hamlet of Clinton Corners was classified as good land.

In 1737, the patents were reorganized into precincts, with the current town of Clinton being part of the Charlotte precinct from 1762 until 1788, when the Dutchess County Legislature reorganized the precincts into towns; Clinton was formed from parts of Charlotte and Rhinebeck precincts, and named in commemoration of the service of Governor George Clinton. In 1821, the current boundaries were set when the towns of Pleasant Valley and Hyde Park were created out of the larger Clinton town. Early European settlers in Clinton filtered in from two primary directions. In the early 1700s, Rhinebeck was the largest settlement in Dutchess County, taking advantage of the Hudson River for transportation of people and produce. Across Dutchess County to the east the settlements of Amenia and Wassaic in the Harlem River valley were also attracting European settlers. In 1718, a road was established branching off from the central Wassaic-Poughkeepsie road to connect to the northern Amenia-Rhinbeck road at the Crum Elbow Creek crossing.

In 1748, the road commissioners from Rhinebeck and Crum Elbow precincts met at the bridge over Crum Elbow Creek to discuss the "old wissasiek road" which had been in existence for 30 years. One of those commissioners was Mordecai Lester. Lester's home and that of his son were mentioned in the commission's report as landmarks along the roads north and south of the hamlet of Clinton Corners. In addition to the early Dutch and English settlers, by the mid 1700s German Palatines were moving into the western regions of Clinton. By the 1770s, Quakers were moving up into Clinton from the southeast.

Clinton participated in the Civil War, with men enlisting in the 128th and 150th regiments. After the war ended, dairy farmers brought their milk by wagon to the creamery in the hamlet of Clinton Corners by the tracks of the Poughkeepsie and Eastern Railway. This rail line continued to the Grove Amusement Park at the southeast end of Upton Lake and the ice house at the northeast end of the lake. After the railway declined with the advent of the automobile, the park closed. During the second half of the 20th century, the town of Clinton transformed from an agricultural into a residential center.

== Geography ==
According to the United States Census Bureau, the town has a total area of 38.8 square miles (100.5 km^{2}), of which 38.1 square miles (98.8 km^{2}) is land and 0.66 square miles (1.7 km^{2}), or 1.65%, is water.

The Taconic State Parkway passes through the town.

== Demographics ==
Historical population
Census	Pop.	Note	%±
1830	2,130		—
1840	1,830		−14.1%
1850	1,795		−1.9%
1860	1,922		7.1%
1870	1,708		−11.1%
1880	1,640		−4.0%
1890	1,426		−13.0%
1900	1,370		−3.9%
1910	1,278		−6.7%
1920	1,198		−6.3%
1930	1,041		−13.1%
1940	1,070		2.8%
1950	1,233		15.2%
1960	1,639		32.9%
1970	2,604		58.9%
1980	3,394		30.3%
1990	3,760		10.8%
2000	4,010		6.6%
2010	4,312		7.5%
2020	4,037		−6.4%
U.S. Decennial Census

As of the census of 2000, there were 4,010 people, 1,502 households, and 1,120 families residing in the town. The population density was 104.3 inhabitants per square mile (40.3/km^{2}). There were 1,734 housing units at an average density of 45.1 per square mile (17.4/km^{2}). The racial makeup of the town was 96.03% White, 1.60% African American, 0.35% Native American, 1.02% Asian, 0.22% from other races, and 0.77% from two or more races. Hispanic or Latino people of any race were 1.75% of the population.

There were 1,502 households, out of which 34.3% had children under the age of 18 living with them, 65.1% were married couples living together, 6.6% had a female householder with no husband present, and 25.4% were non-families. 19.2% of all households were made up of individuals, and 6.9% had someone living alone who was 65 years of age or older. The average household size was 2.63 and the average family size was 3.02.

In the town, the population was spread out, with 24.7% under the age of 18, 4.1% from 18 to 24, 29.8% from 25 to 44, 30.0% from 45 to 64, and 11.4% who were 65 years of age or older. The median age was 41 years. For every 100 females, there were 100.2 males. For every 100 females age 18 and over, there were 98.6 males.

The median income for a household in the town was $66,406, and the median income for a family was $71,908. Males had a median income of $45,511 versus $32,750 for females. The per capita income for the town was $29,565. About 3.4% of families and 3.7% of the population were below the poverty line, including 1.9% of those under age 18 and 4.0% of those age 65 or over.

== Communities in Clinton ==
- Bulls Head – A hamlet in the northeast of the town
- Clinton Corners – A hamlet in the southeast of the town
- Clinton Hollow – A hamlet in the south center of the town
- Frost Mills – A hamlet near the center of western town line
- Hibernia – A hamlet in the south east corner of the town
- Pleasant Plains – A hamlet in the central western section of the town
- Schultzville – A hamlet in the northern central section of the town

== Notable people ==
- Amy Goldman Fowler, (b. 1954); billionaire heiress

== Sources ==
- McDermott, William. Clinton: Dutchess County, NY: A History of a Town (1987).
