= New York State Route 164 =

State highway in Putnam County, New York, US

New York State Route 164
- Map of Patterson with NY 164 highlighted in red

Route information
- Maintained by NYSDOT
- Length: 2.89 mi (4.65 km)
- Existed: January 1, 1970–present

Major junctions
- West end: NY 311 in Patterson
- East end: NY 22 in Patterson

Location
- Country: United States
- State: New York
- Counties: Putnam

Highway system
- New York Highways; Interstate; US; State; Reference; Parkways
← NY 164	→ NY 165

New York State Route 164 (NY 164) is a short state highway located entirely in the town of Patterson in northeastern Putnam County, New York, in the United States. It is a short, two-lane back road that does not pass through any major populated areas and serves primarily as a connector between NY 311 and NY 22. NY 164 also allows for faster passage from Interstate 84 (I-84) to the Putnam Lake area via NY 311. The route was originally designated as NY 312 during the 1930s and later became part of NY 216. NY 164 was established on January 1, 1970, following the truncation of NY 216 to its current eastern terminus.

== Route description ==
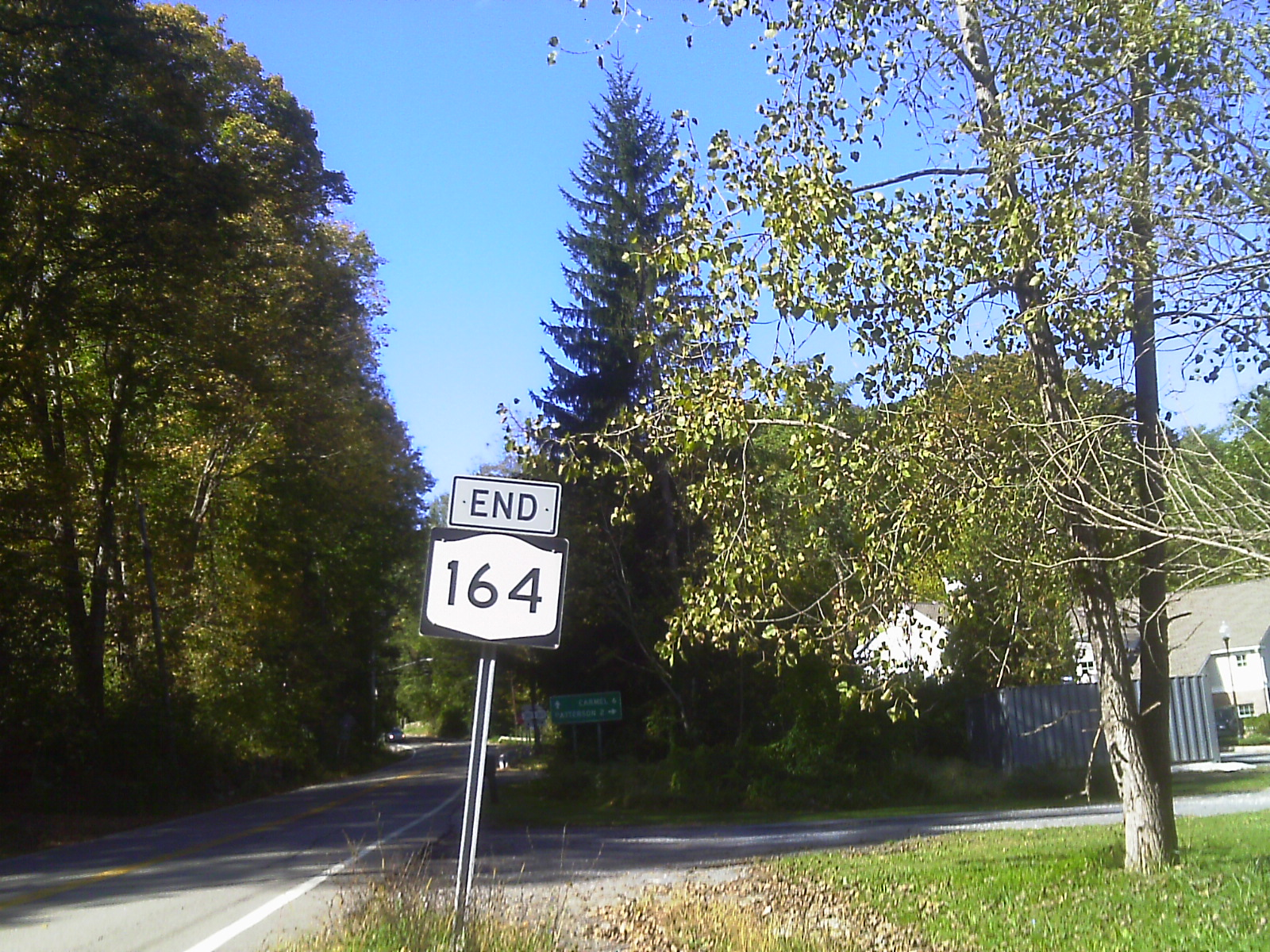
NY 164 westbound at its terminus in Patterson at NY 311

In the west, NY 164 splits off from NY 311 a short distance east of I-84. It crosses under the Metro-North Railroad's Harlem Line tracks three times, including two one-lane underpasses with limited sight to the other side. It passes along the northern base of a small mountain and turns slightly southward. The highway turns due eastward and intersects with County Route 64 in the hamlet of Towners. Just to the north is Mandel Pond, and the route makes a series of erratic turns around small mountains, passing south of Cornwall Hill as it does so. NY 164 turns south-southeast and ends at NY 22 in Patterson, east of the East Branch Croton River.

== History ==
The entirety of modern-day NY 164 was originally designated as NY 312 in the 1930 renumbering of state highways in New York. When the NY 312 designation was shifted south to its current location in the town of Southeast c. 1937, its former routing in Patterson became part of an extended NY 216, which connected with its current routing by way of modern NY 311, NY 292 and NY 55. NY 216 was truncated to its current length on January 1, 1970. The portion of its former alignment between NY 311 and NY 22 was then redesignated as NY 164.

== Major intersections ==
The entire route is in Patterson, Putnam County.

mi	km	Destinations	Notes
0.00	0.00	NY 311 – Carmel, Patterson	Western terminus
2.89	4.65	NY 22 – Brewster, Pawling	Eastern terminus; hamlet of Haines Corners
1.000 mi = 1.609 km; 1.000 km = 0.621 mi
