= List of county routes in Putnam County, New York =

Example of standard signage for county routes in Putnam County.

County routes in Putnam County, New York, known within the county as "county roads", are owned and maintained by the Putnam County Department of Highways and Facilities.

Most of the county road numbers, which are all two-digits, are signed with the standard yellow-on-blue pentagon route marker specified by the Manual on Uniform Traffic Control Devices (sign M1–6), which is also used in other counties throughout the state. However, the frequency of signage for county routes is not as high as that of state route signage. For instance, it is not uncommon for a road to have its number signed only on it and not on intersecting roads. This is reflected in local vernacular, as most residents refer to the county roads by name and not by number.

The first digit of a county road number indicates a town along the road, usually the town of origin. Exceptions to this scheme exist, however. The three villages in Putnam County are included with their respective towns.

- 1 is Philipstown
- 2 is Putnam Valley
- 3 and 7 are Carmel
- 4 is Kent
- 5 is Southeast
- 6 is Patterson

On a town level, the numbers are assigned in a roughly west-to-east and south-to-north fashion. There is no known numbering scheme within the towns, as numbers are assigned based on the order of establishment. The presence of skipped numbers in the order (such as CR 31) implies that there are a few decommissioned roads, but some (like CR 52) were likely skipped intentionally to avoid confusion with state routes in the county.

== Routes 1–50 ==
Route	Length (mi)	Length (km)	From	Via	To	Notes
CR 10	2.75	4.43	NY 301 in Nelsonville	Fishkill Road	US 9 in Philipstown	
CR 11	1.79	2.88	NY 9D	Snake Hill Road in Philipstown	US 9	
CR 12	0.49	0.79	NY 9D / NY 403	Lower Station Road in Philipstown	Garrison Station	
CR 13	0.78	1.26	Westchester County line	Gallows Hill Road in Philipstown	CR 15	
CR 14	0.38	0.61	Garrison Station	Upper Station Road in Philipstown	NY 9D	
CR 15	1.46	2.35	CR 13 in Philipstown	Sprout Brook Road	Indian Lake Road in Putnam Valley	
CR 16	0.50	0.80	NY 9D in Philipstown	Peekskill Road	NY 301 in Nelsonville	
CR 17	0.15	0.24	Cold Spring village line	Fair Street in Philipstown	NY 9D	
CR 20	6.27	10.09	Westchester County line	Oscawana Lake Road in Putnam Valley	North Shore Road	
CR 21	11.34	18.25	CR 20 in Putnam Valley	Peekskill Hollow Road	NY 301 in Kent	
CR 22	2.14	3.44	CR 20	Church Road in Putnam Valley	CR 21 / CR 23	
CR 23	1.32	2.12	Westchester County line	Mill Street in Putnam Valley	CR 21 / CR 22	
CR 24	2.30	3.70	Westchester County line in Carmel	Wood Street	CR 30 in Putnam Valley	
CR 30	1.86	2.99	Taconic State Parkway in Putnam Valley	Secor Road	NY 6N in Carmel	
CR 32	5.56	8.95	NY 6N	Hill Street and Long Pond and Crane roads in Carmel	US 6	
CR 33	2.97	4.78	NY 6N	West Lake and North Lake boulevards in Carmel	CR 72	
CR 34	4.02	6.47	US 6	Croton Falls Road in Carmel	Westchester County line (becomes CR 136)	
CR 35	4.37	7.03	US 6	Stoneleigh Road in Carmel	Westchester County line (becomes CR 137)	
CR 36	5.02	8.08	US 6 in Carmel	Drewville Road	US 6 in Southeast	
CR 37	2.16	3.48	US 6 / NY 118	Baldwin Place Road in Carmel	NY 6N	
CR 38	2.00	3.22	CR 34	West Shore Drive in Carmel	CR 36	
CR 41	2.92	4.70	NY 301 in Carmel	Gipsy Trail Road	Maynard Road in Kent	
CR 42	6.01	9.67	NY 301	Farmers Mills Road in Kent	NY 52	
CR 43	3.46	5.57	NY 311 in Patterson	Ludingtonville Road	I-84/NY 52 in Kent	
CR 44	1.02	1.64	CR 60 in Carmel	Palmer and Hill and Dale roads	CR 45 in Kent	
CR 45	1.59	2.56	NY 52 in Kent	Towners Road	CR 60 in Patterson	
CR 46	0.87	1.40	CR 60 in Patterson	Terry Hill Road	NY 311 in Kent	
CR 47	3.50	5.63	Kittredge Drive	Carmel-Kent Cliffs Road	NY 52	Given to state in 1980; now part of NY 301.
CR 47	0.20	0.32	CR 21	Old Route 301 in Kent	NY 301	Former routing of NY 301
CR 48	0.67	1.08	NY 52	Horsepound Road in Kent	Nichols Street	
CR 49	0.35	0.56	CR 45 in Kent	Noonan Drive	CR 60 in Patterson	
CR 50	0.47	0.76	US 6 / US 202 / NY 22	Sodom Road in Southeast	Dead end	Former routing of NY 22

== Routes 51 and up ==
Route	Length (mi)	Length (km)	From	Via	To	Notes
CR 51	1.93	3.11	CR 55 in Southeast	Turk Hill Road	US 202 / NY 22 in Brewster	
CR 53	1.05	1.69	Brewster village line	North Main Street and Tonetta Lake and Peaceable Hill roads in Southeast	US 6	
CR 54	3.50	5.63	NY 22	Milltown Road in Southeast	Connecticut state line	
CR 55	2.38	3.83	US 202 / NY 22	Deans Corner and North Salem roads in Southeast	Westchester County line (becomes CR 310)	Formerly part of NY 124
CR 56	0.39	0.63	US 202 / NY 22 / CR 51 in Southeast	Railroad Avenue	US 6 in Brewster	
CR 57	1.32	2.12	US 6 in Southeast	John Simpson Road	CR 60 in Carmel	
CR 58	2.85	4.59	CR 53	Tonetta Lake and North Brewster roads in Southeast	NY 312	
CR 59	0.48	0.77	CR 53	Crosby Avenue in Southeast	CR 53	
CR 60	4.69	7.55	NY 52 in Carmel	Fair Street	NY 311 in Patterson	
CR 61	0.87	1.40	Dead end at Croton River in Southeast	Old Doansburg Lane and Gage Road	CR 65 in Patterson	
CR 62	3.10	4.99	NY 312 in Southeast	Farm to Market Road	NY 164 in Patterson	
CR 63	0.74	1.19	NY 292	Harmony Road in Patterson	Dutchess County line (becomes CR 69)	
CR 64	2.36	3.80	NY 164	Cornwall Hill Road in Patterson	NY 311	
CR 65	4.45	7.16	NY 22 in Southeast	Doansburg and East Branch roads	CR 68 in Patterson	
CR 66	1.12	1.80	CR 65	Fairfield Drive in Patterson	Connecticut state line	
CR 67	1.54	2.48	CR 66	Haviland Drive in Patterson	Irby Road	
CR 68	2.50	4.02	NY 22	Haviland Hollow Road in Patterson	Connecticut state line	
CR 70	0.93	1.50	CR 34	Stebbins Road in Carmel	CR 38	
CR 71	1.08	1.74	CR 37	Myrtle Avenue in Carmel	NY 6N	
CR 72	1.39	2.24	Dead end	Marina Drive, East Lake Boulevard, and Msgr. O'Brien Drive in Carmel	US 6	
CR 73	0.12	0.19	US 6 / CR 32	Frances Kiernan Place in Carmel	Dead end	Former routing of US 6

== See also ==
- County routes in New York
