= New York State Route 216 =

State highway in Dutchess County, New York, US

New York State Route 216
- Map of Dutchess County in eastern New York with NY 216 highlighted in red

Route information
- Maintained by NYSDOT
- Length: 6.22 mi (10.01 km)
- Existed: 1930–present

Major junctions
- West end: NY 52 in East Fishkill
- East end: NY 55 in Beekman

Location
- Country: United States
- State: New York
- Counties: Dutchess

Highway system
- New York Highways; Interstate; US; State; Reference; Parkways
← NY 215	→ NY 217

New York State Route 216 (NY 216) is a short state highway located entirely in Dutchess County, New York, in the United States. At 6.22 miles (10.01 km) in length, it connects NY 52 and NY 55 between the hamlets of Stormville (within the town of East Fishkill) at the west end and Poughquag (within the town of Beekman) at the east. The route serves the hamlet of Green Haven and passes by the Green Haven Correctional Facility.

Route 216 was originally part of NY 39 in the 1920s. The portion of NY 39 from Stormville to West Patterson was redesignated as part of NY 52 in the 1930 renumbering of state highways in New York. At the same time, an alternate route of NY 52 between Stormville and Towners was assigned the NY 216 designation. The alignments of NY 52 and NY 216 between the two locations were largely swapped in 1937. In 1970, Route 216 was truncated to its current eastern terminus in Poughquag.

== Route description ==
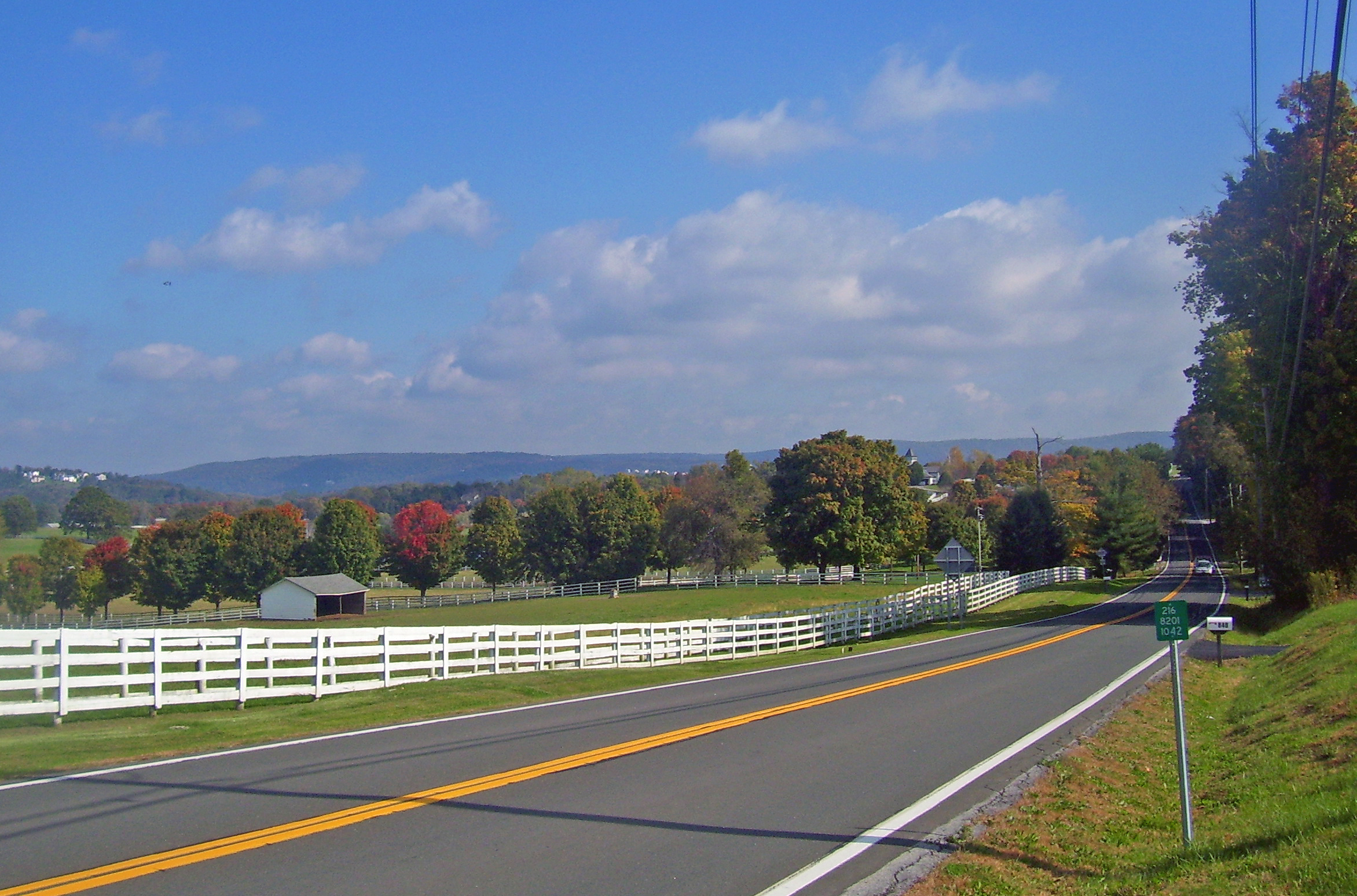
Landscape along NY 216 near Green Haven

NY 216's western terminus is at an intersection with NY 52 just south of the Trump National Golf Club in Stormville, a hamlet within the town of East Fishkill. It heads northeast into the center of Stormville and intersects with Old Route 52, a former alignment of NY 52. The route makes a sharp turn to the north before intersecting with Phillips Road and turning eastward. Proceeding east, NY 216 intersects Green Haven Road (County Route 8 or CR 8) in the hamlet of Green Haven. South of this intersection is the Green Haven Correctional Facility. After intersecting with several local roads, it turns north and intersects Main Street (CR 7) in the Beekman hamlet of Poughquag. South of the Beekman Cemetery, NY 216 terminates at NY 55.

== History ==
In the mid-1920s, NY 39 was assigned to an alignment extending from Poughkeepsie to Patterson via East Fishkill, Stormville and Poughquag. In the 1930 renumbering of state highways in New York, the portion of NY 39 between East Fishkill and the western fringe of Patterson was redesignated as part of the new NY 52 while the segment between Patterson and NY 22 was renumbered to NY 311. At the same time, NY 216 was assigned to a highway extending from NY 52 in Stormville southeast to NY 52 near Towners. NY 216 followed modern NY 52 north of Ludingtonville and Ludingtonville Road south of the hamlet.

NY 52 and NY 216 largely swapped alignments in Spring 1937 as part of a larger realignment of NY 52 through Dutchess and Putnam counties. Route 52 was relocated onto NY 216 between Stormville and Ludingtonville, from where it followed a new roadway south to Lake Carmel. The former alignment of NY 52 between Stormville and Towners became NY 216, which was also extended eastward along NY 164 to a new eastern terminus at NY 22 east of Towners. The alignment of NY 216 remained unaltered until January 1, 1970, when Route 216 was truncated to its current eastern terminus in Poughquag. As part of the truncation, NY 216's former alignment from West Pawling to Patterson was renumbered to NY 292 while the east–west roadway through Towners became NY 164.

== Major intersections ==
The entire route is in Dutchess County.

Location	mi	km	Destinations	Notes
Town of East Fishkill	0.00	0.00	NY 52 – Carmel, Fishkill	Western terminus; hamlet of Stormville
Town of Beekman	6.22	10.01	NY 55	Eastern terminus; hamlet of Poughquag
1.000 mi = 1.609 km; 1.000 km = 0.621 mi
