= New York State Route 39 (1920s–1930) =

Former highway in New York

New York State Route 39
- NY 39 highlighted in red

Route information
- Maintained by NYSDH
- Length: 32.85 mi (52.87 km)
- Existed: mid-1920s–1930

Major junctions
- West end: NY 21 in Poughkeepsie
- East end: NY 22 in Patterson

Location
- Country: United States
- State: New York
- Counties: Dutchess, Putnam

Highway system
- New York Highways; Interstate; US; State; Reference; Parkways
← NY 38B	→ NY 39

New York State Route 39 (NY 39) was a 32.85-mile-long (52.87 km) state highway in the Hudson Valley region of New York in the United States. It stretched from NY 21 (now U.S. Route 44) in the town of Poughkeepsie to NY 22 in Patterson, New York. NY 39 was designated in the mid-1920s and was replaced with NY 202, NY 311, and part of NY 52 in the 1930 renumbering of state highways in New York.

== Route description ==
NY 39 began in the town of Poughkeepsie at NY 21. The route headed southeastward past the western fringe of La Grange, and into Wappingers Falls where it crossed the Wappinger Creek. The route entered East Fishkill, where it began to turn northeastward through Stormville and the hamlet of Green Haven. It then passed just south of Beekman, where it started to once again turn southeastward. NY 39 passed through Poughquag and Pawling, and subsequently ran along the western shore of Whaley Lake. From here, the route entered Holmes prior to passing into Putnam County. At West Patterson, NY 39 turned east, then terminated at NY 22 in Patterson.

== History ==
NY 39 was designated in the mid-1920s to what is now NY 376 from Poughkeepsie to East Fishkill, NY 52 between East Fishkill and Stormville, NY 216 from Stormville to Poughquag, NY 55 between Poughquag and West Pawling, NY 292 from West Pawling to West Patterson, and NY 311 between West Patterson and Patterson. In the 1930 renumbering of state highways in New York, the portion of NY 39 between East Fishkill and the western fringe of Patterson was redesignated as part of the new NY 52 while the segment between Poughkeepsie and East Fishkill was renumbered to NY 202. Between Patterson and NY 22, old NY 39 was renumbered to NY 311.

== Major intersections ==
County	Location	mi	km	Destinations	Notes
Dutchess	Town of Poughkeepsie	0.00	0.00	NY 21	
Putnam	Patterson	32.85	52.87	NY 22	
1.000 mi = 1.609 km; 1.000 km = 0.621 mi
