= Wonder Lake State Park =

State park in New York state, United States

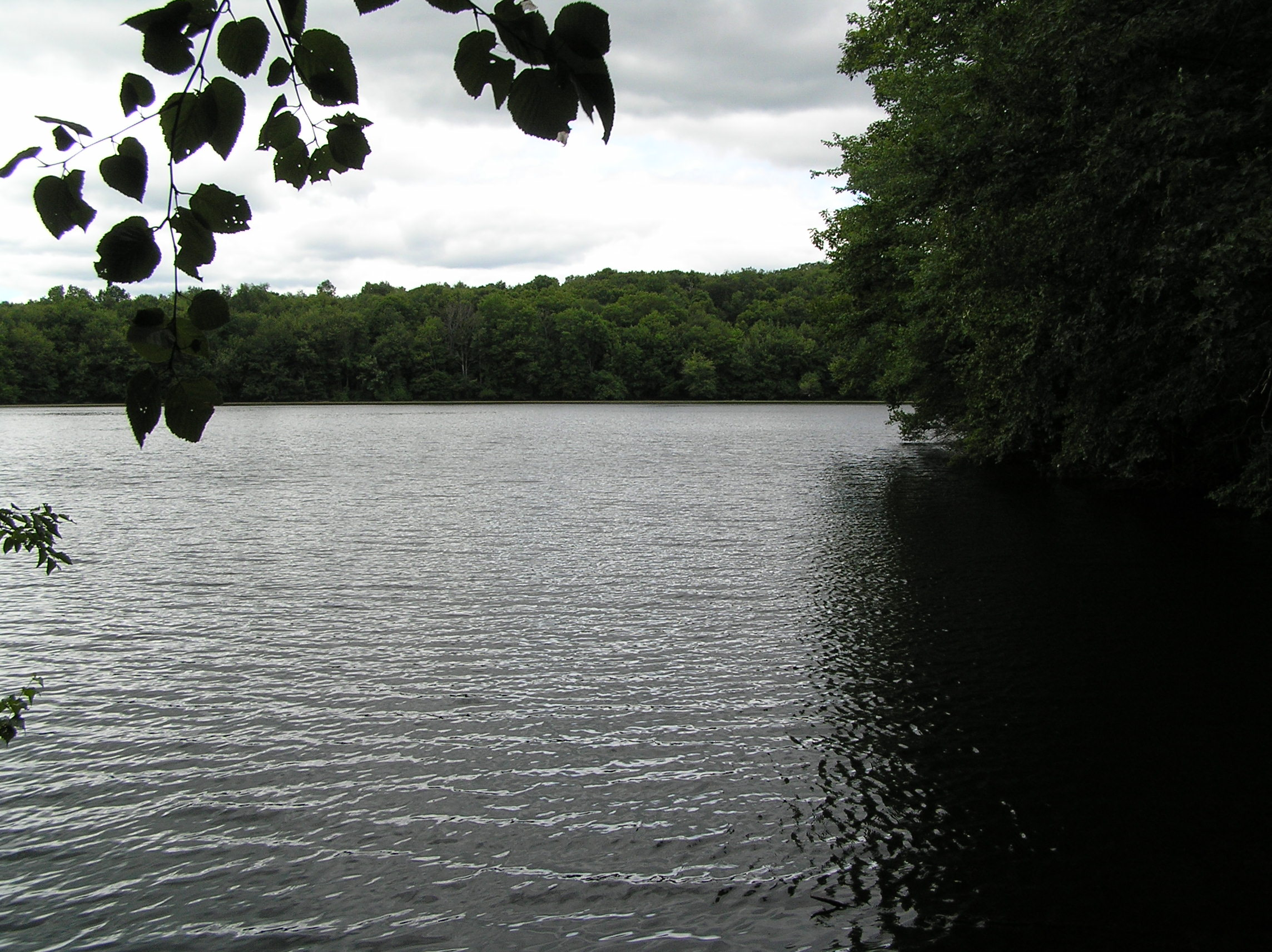
- Wonder Lake in Patterson, New York

- Location within New York
- Type: State park
- Location: 380 Ludingtonville Rd; Holmes, New York
- Nearest city: Carmel, New York
- Coordinates: 41°29′42″N 73°38′57″W
- Area: 1,145 acres (4.63 km^{2})
- Created: 1998
- Operator: New York State Office of Parks, Recreation and Historic Preservation
- Open: All year
- Website: Wonder Lake State Park

Wonder Lake State Park is a 1,145-acre (4.6 km^{2}) Putnam County state park located in Patterson, New York, United States.

== History ==
Thirty-acre (0.12 km^{2}) Wonder Lake was constructed in the 1930s as part of a series of improvements to the property by A. L. Cushman, who owned a chain of bakeries in New York City. The smaller Laurel Pond, three acres (0.012 km^{2}) in size, was also formed after the construction of a dam was completed during the same time period.

The core of Wonder Lake State Park was the summer home of television star Elizabeth Montgomery prior to her death in 1995.

The New York State Office of Parks, Recreation and Historic Preservation acquired the 794-acre (3.21 km^{2}) Wonder Lake property in November 1998 using Clean Water/Clean Air Bond Act funds. The park was expanded by the purchase of 106 acres (0.4 km^{2}) of open space in February 2006 and it was further expanded in 2010, expanding the park to its current size. Prior to the 106-acre (0.43 km^{2}) purchase, the tract was surrounded by private property with no public access.

== Park's description ==
As of 2013, Wonder Lake State Park contained 8.7 miles (14 km) of trails, including the Highlands Trail, which passes Laurel Pond and encircles Wonder Lake. Four other trails cover much of the northern, central and western areas of the park.

Wonder Lake State Park serves to protect portions of the Great Swamp watershed, and serves as a link with other public lands in the area.

== See also ==
- List of New York state parks
