= Great Swamp (New York) =

Coordinates: 41°32′25″N 073°35′57″W

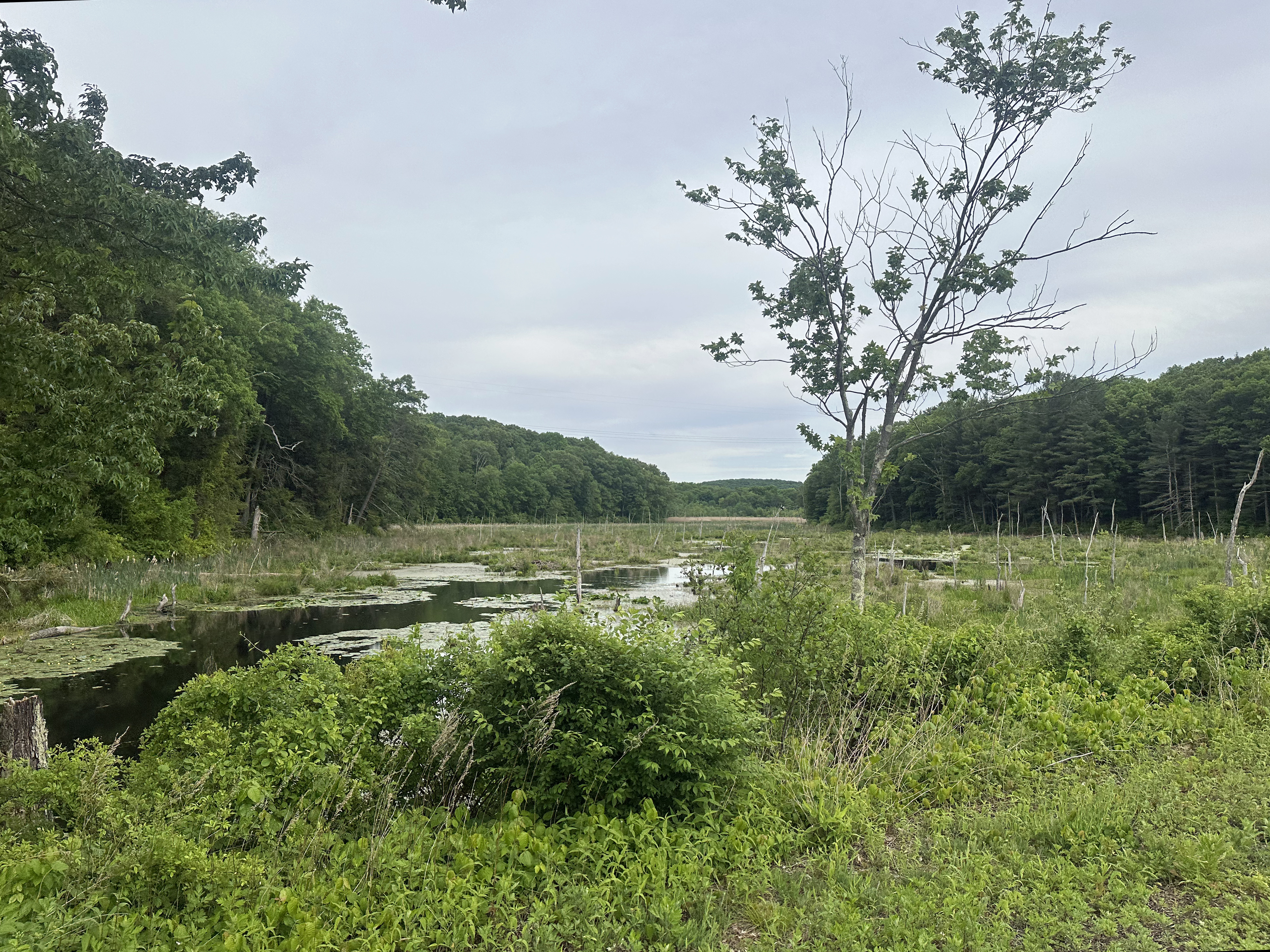
Great Swamp in Putnam County

The Great Swamp in eastern Putnam and Dutchess counties is one of the largest wetlands in the U.S. state of New York.

== Geography and ecology ==
The Great Swamp, also known as the Great Patterson Swamp, is located in eastern Putnam and Dutchess counties, in the U.S. state of New York. The swamp covers almost 6,000 acres (24 km^{2}) of land in the Putnam County municipalities of Southeast, Patterson, and the Dutchess County municipalities of Town of Pawling, the Village of Pawling and the Town of Dover, making it one of the largest wetlands in the state. The Great Swamp is located at the northern end of the intruding suburban development from Westchester County and New York City to the south. Roughly 40,000 people live in the 63,018-acre (255.02 km^{2}) watershed, which is divided into two sections at Pawling. To the north, the water flows from the Swamp River into the Ten Mile River, which flows into the Housantonic River, and in time reaches the Long Island Sound. To the south, the East Branch of the Croton flows southward to the Croton River, and eventually into the East Branch Reservoir, one of New York City's drinking water reservoirs. The Great Swamp is a Critical Environmental Area, (CEA) designated DP-22 by the New York State Department of Environmental Conservation. The largest single body of water within the Great Swamp is Ice Pond, accessed by a steep dirt road. Ice Pond was utilized for at least two ice harvesting operations, one of which dates back to 1867.

The Great Swamp is home to about 180 species of bird, including 100 that breed there. The red-winged blackbird is one of the most commonly observed, while the bittern, sora, and marsh wren are often not seen. The large size, wide range of habitat, and river dynamics are what make these wetlands so suitable for wildlife. Several areas, ponds, and preserves have concentrated wildlife. Camp Sharparoon, now the Dover Furnace Shooting Preserve, an 1,800-acre (7.3 km^{2}) area west of New York State Route 22, was home to one of the first breeding grounds for ravens within the county. Other commonly seen species include turkey vultures, red-tailed hawks, swallows, chimney swift, black vulture, American redstart, veery, indigo bunting, Louisiana waterthrush, northern waterthrush, winter wren, black-throated green warbler, willow flycatcher, and alder flycatcher. Throughout other areas, the wood duck, mallard, Canada goose, great blue heron, and belted kingfisher are seen nesting in various bridges. The Great Swamp is Audubon-designated Important Bird Area #89.

== History ==
In and around Patterson, layers of underground clay suggest the swamp was once a large and shallow lake. While it is unknown exactly when humans first inhabited the region, it is estimated that Archaic people existed there for about 8,000 years. Artifacts found at the Rosebud Site off of New York State Route 311 suggest occupations in the swamp date back to the Woodland period. Archaic hunters were drawn to the wetland because of its vast array of plants and vegetables, as well as migratory waterfowl and fish. According to Horace Hillery in an article entitled The Great Swamp, "The Indian-Dutch treaty of 1617 said furs from The Great Swamp in Patterson were most desirable. The Indian Cemetery at the mouth of Haviland Hollow was probably near the Indian winter trapping camp." The Great Swamp was sold to Lt. Gov. Nathan Gold of Connecticut in 1707, and thereafter, the first white settlers fought over ownership of the eastern side of the wetland. This tract of land is known as The Oblong, and until 1731, was part of Connecticut. In consideration of a separate piece of land further south, Connecticut surrendered to New York, and the state gained ownership. Between 1744 and 1757, Pine Island, a ledge in the middle of the swamp, served as a camp for a set of counterfeiters who printed thousands of 20 Shilling Rhode Island notes.

Local farmers were disappointed at the loss of potential farm land to the swamp. In 1797, a petition was sent to the New York State Legislature for the swamp to be drained. Another similar proposal arose in 1840, though the idea was never implemented. New York City sought the region as a potential reservoir in the early 1900s. The swamp had an effect on the local region. Children in Patterson were often deemed "swamp rats" by school students in nearby Carmel.

In March 1936, a "great and unusual ice flood" caused local water levels to rise. The bridge carrying New York State Route 311 over the Great Swamp received cracks in its foundation due to the pressure of the water and melting ice, and was lifted off its foundation and swept into the swamp.

== See also ==
- New York State Route 311
