= Thunder Ridge Ski Area =

Ski area in New York, United States

Coordinates: 41°30′26″N 73°34′52″W

Thunder Ridge

- Thunder Ridge Trail Map
- Interactive map of Thunder Ridge
- Location: Patterson, New York
- Status: Operating
- Vertical: 403 ft (123 m)
- Top elevation: 880 ft (270 m)
- Skiable area: 90 acres (360,000 m^{2})
- Trails: 21; 48% easiest 19% more difficult 33% most difficult
- Lift system: 3 chairlifts, 4 magic carpets
- Terrain parks: Yes, 1
- Snowmaking: Yes, 90% coverage
- Night skiing: Yes
- Website: Website

Thunder Ridge is a small ski area located in Patterson, NY. It attracts people throughout the New York metropolitan area. While it does not receive a lot of snowfall, Thunder Ridge does have snowmaking capabilities which can cover 95% of the mountain. Because it is open at night, Thunder Ridge is a haven for high school ski racing. The mountain hosts part of Hudson Valley League racing.

== History ==
Under previous ownership the mountain was known as Birch Hill (1957–1968), Big Birch (1968–1995), Thunder Ridge Ski Area (1995–present).

After coming under new ownership, many of the old trails were decommissioned and other trails given priority. Since 2018 around 95% of the mountain is covered with snowmaking equipment, up from 75% under the old ownership. Since 2015, equipment has gone through a major upgrade including the purchase of two new groomers, ten new snow fans, and snow guns.

== Trails ==
Thunder Ridge Ski area has 23 trails, nine of which are accessible from the Triple Chair, six from the double chair, four from both chairs, and five bunny trails. It has seven black diamonds, five blue squares, and nine green circles.

Accessible from Triple Chair
Name	Rating
Lovers Lane	
Fawn Meadow	
Santa Fe: Terrain Park	
Evergreen	
Sunset Run	
Upper Competition	
(Lower) Competition	
Fools Delight	
The Face	
Blackberry Pass	

Accessible From Double Chair
Name	Rating
Bull's Run: Deer Pasture; Don's Drop	
Eagle's Lair	
Wildcat	
Timber Wolf	

Accessible from Both Chairs
Name	Rating
Sissy Schuss (old Halfpipe)	
The Road	
Don's Drop	
Lovers Lane (since 2019)	

Bunny Hills
Name	Rating
Little Thunder	
Fun Run	
You Can Do It!	
Movin Up	
Little Thunder	
Mini Thunder	

== Lifts ==
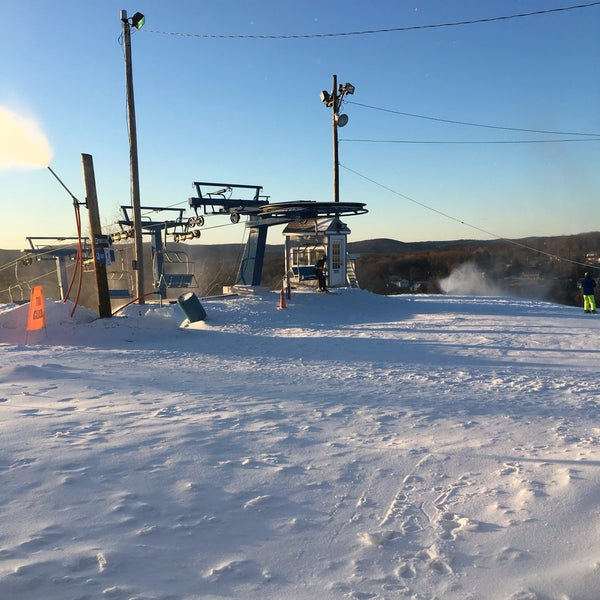
Top of the main lift (the triple) as seen from the 'Top medical depôt'.

As of 2022, Thunder Ridge has three chairlifts (Two doubles and one triple) and four magic carpets. In 1958 a T-Bar opened at then Birch Hill- servicing the main part of today's ski area. Numerous Tows were also installed on the mountain. Sometime in the 1960s, a Borvig double chairlift was installed to the summit; it remains the area's longest and oldest lift. In about 1967, a short double chairlift was installed which today served Little Thunder. In 1986, a Borvig triple chairlift was installed to supersede and eventually replace the T-Bar lift, which it did. In the early 2000s, four Magic Carpet lifts were installed on Thunder Ridge to replace the Tows. Remnants of the tows can still be seen to this day.

During the mid-1960s the Mahopac High School ski team raced and trained at Birch Hill, as did the teams from Carmel and some other Putnam County and Northern Westchester county schools. The lodge was a simple place with a gravel floor.

Today the area maintains seven running lifts; four carpets (one open all the time (You can do it, "Toyland"), two open on the weekends, one used as a backup), a triple lift (main lift, "the triple"), a double lift (secondary lift, "the double"), and one small double lift (beginner lift, "Little Thunder"). Today there remain three neglected tows (one serving the halfpipe, and one serving the terrain park, and one which served the old terrain park). Both the triple and double were re-surfaced and gained more modern accessories and safety equipment in the late 2010s.
