= New York State Route 292 =

Highway in New York

New York State Route 292
- NY 292 highlighted in red

Route information
- Maintained by NYSDOT
- Length: 7.58 mi (12.20 km)
- Existed: January 1, 1970–present

Major junctions
- South end: NY 311 in Patterson
- North end: NY 55 in Pawling

Location
- Country: United States
- State: New York
- Counties: Putnam, Dutchess

Highway system
- New York Highways; Interstate; US; State; Reference; Parkways
← NY 291	→ NY 293

New York State Route 292 (NY 292) is a short 7.58-mile-long (12.20 km) state highway in the Hudson Valley of New York in the United States, bridging Putnam and Dutchess counties. The southern terminus of the route is at an intersection with NY 311 in the town of Patterson, and the northern terminus is at a junction with NY 55 in the town of Pawling. NY 292 traverses mostly rural areas as it heads northwestward through Patterson and Pawling. Along the way, NY 292 passes along the southern and western edges of Whaley Lake.

The portion of NY 292 between West Patterson and Whaley Lake originated as a dirt road named the Patterson–Dutchess County Line Road. This road was reconstructed in 1919 and became part of NY 39, a highway extending from Poughkeepsie to Patterson by way of West Pawling, in the 1920s. In the 1930 renumbering of state highways in New York, the segment of NY 39 from East Fishkill to West Patterson was incorporated into the new NY 52. By the end of the 1930s, the portion of NY 52 from Stormville to West Patterson was renumbered to NY 216. In 1970, NY 216 was truncated to its current length and NY 216's former alignment from West Pawling to Patterson was renumbered to NY 292.

== Route description ==
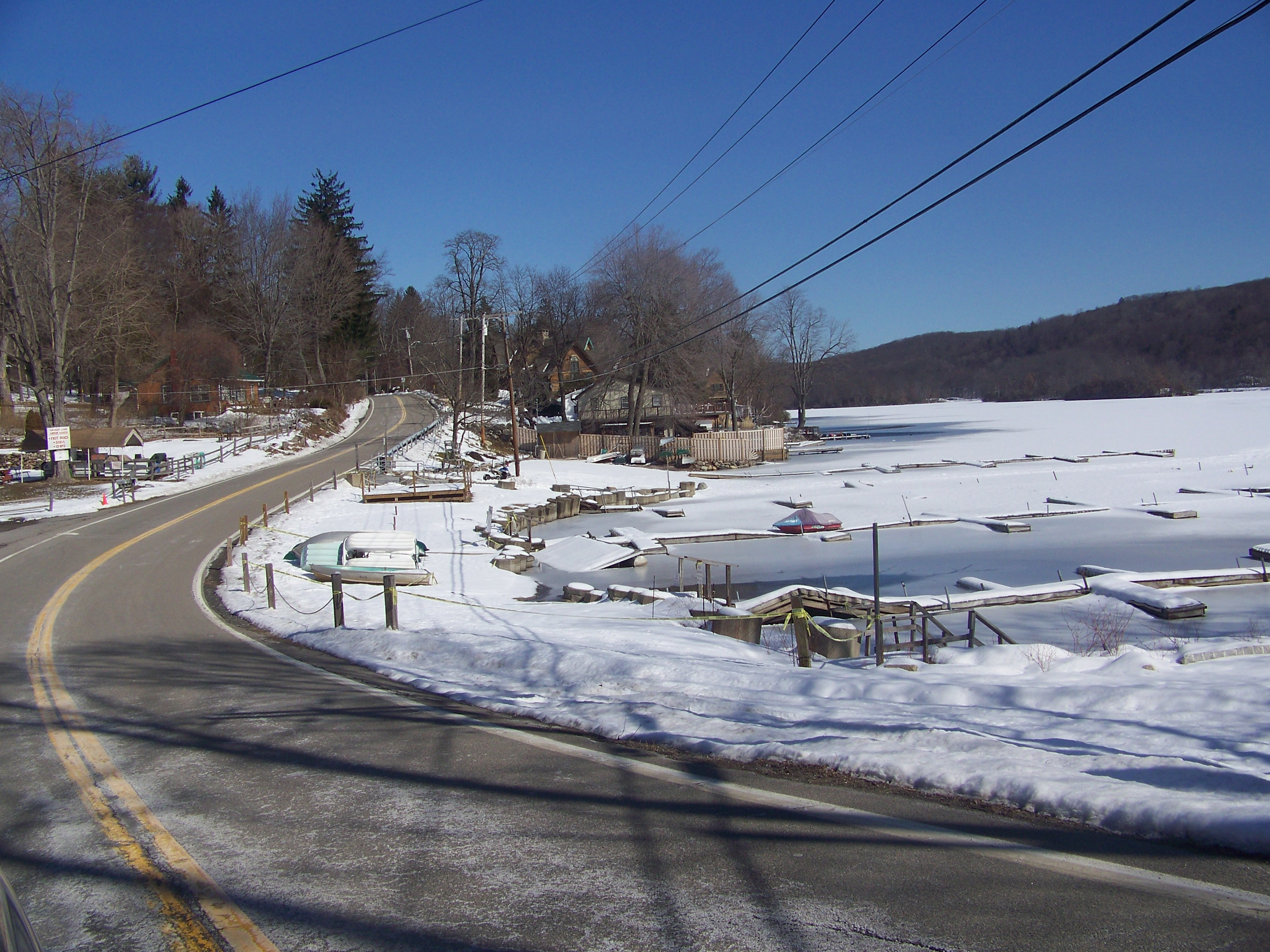
NY 292 in Dutchess County looking north along the western side of Whaley Lake

NY 292 begins at NY 311 near the hamlet of Patterson. It heads west initially, paralleling the Putnam–Dutchess county line as it passes south of the Patterson Veteran Memorial Park and intersects County Route 63 (CR 63). It crosses a minor stream and briefly turns towards the southwest. After passing through the hamlet of West Patterson, NY 292 turns northwest, crosses the stream once again, and enters Dutchess County. Just north of the county line in the Pawling hamlet of Holmes the route intersects with CR 30. Near Holmes, the highway heads due north and passes between two small ponds.

The route continues onward, traveling north through a rural, wooded area of Pawling with little development before curving west to pass along the southern edge of Whaley Lake. At the southwestern tip of the lake, NY 292 turns north, paralleling the western and northern shores of the lake as it heads toward the hamlet of West Pawling. North of the lake in West Pawling, NY 292 turns east onto a former routing of NY 55 for a short distance before ending at modern NY 55 in the northwest corner of Pawling.

== History ==
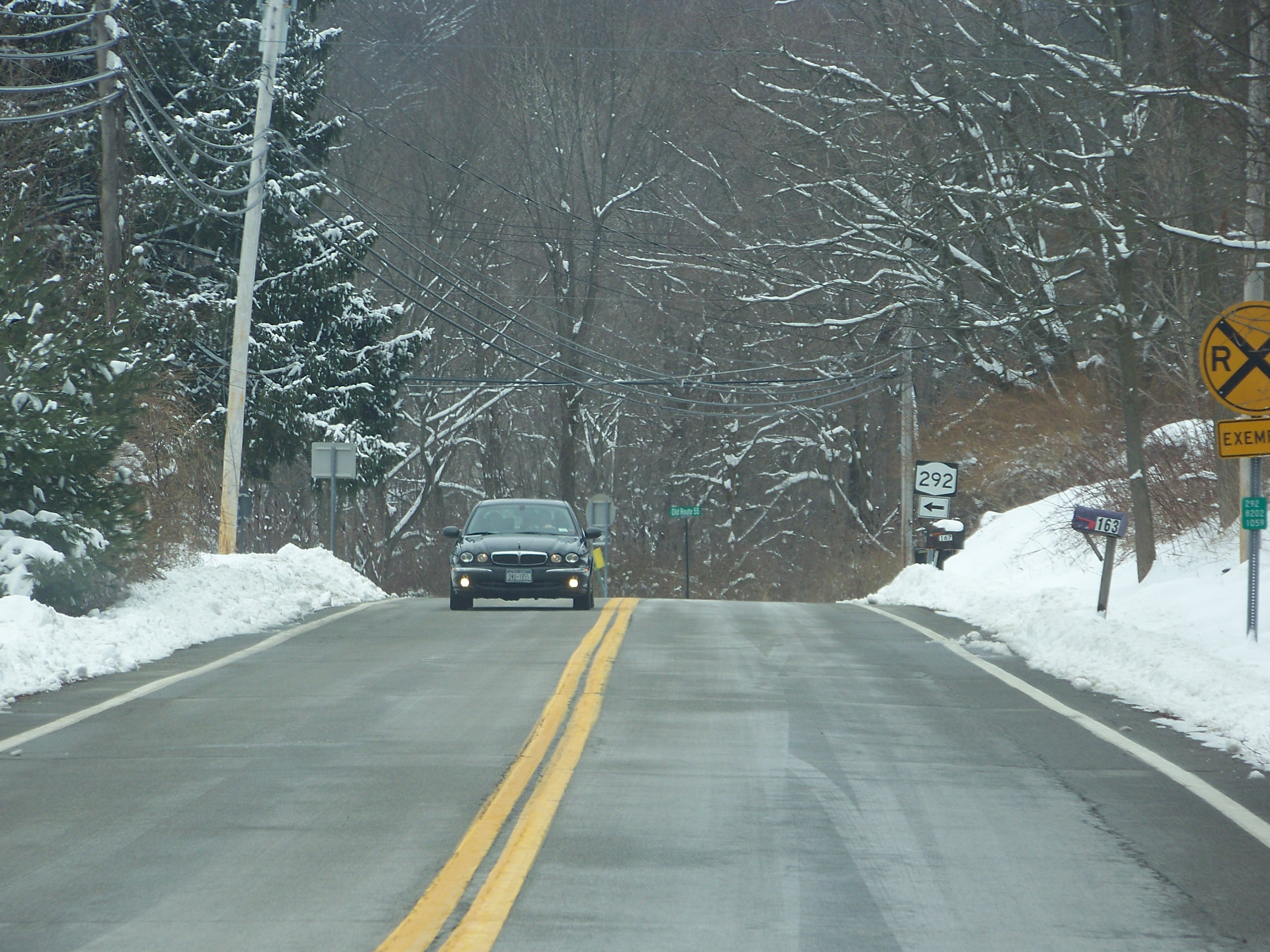
NY 292 just east of where the route leaves Old NY 55

Part of the highway was once part of the Patterson–Dutchess County Line Road, a 1.61-mile (2.59 km) dirt road that extended from Banks Corner to Whaley Lake. Plans were finalized in 1919 to rebuild the previously inadequate road; the project cost an estimated $43,500 ($517,298 2007 USD), including $15,225 ($181,054 2007 USD) of Putnam County's portion of the construction. In May 1919, the Danbury News reported, "On the road between Sodom and Pawling turn left and run through Patterson and continue to West Patterson. From West Patterson a new road about one and one-half miles in length is under construction which connects with a good macadam road passing Whaley Pond and running to Stonehouse, thence continuing ... to Newburgh." The new road was completed in November of that year.

NY 292 was originally part of NY 39 in the 1920s, which ran from Patterson to Poughkeepsie via West Patterson and East Fishkill. In the 1930 renumbering, the portion of NY 39 between East Fishkill and the western fringe of Patterson was redesignated as part of the new NY 52. Between Patterson and NY 22, old NY 39 was renumbered to NY 311.

NY 52 was realigned c. 1937 to follow its current alignment between Stormville and Lake Carmel. The former routing of NY 52 between Stormville and Patterson became part of NY 216. The route remained unchanged until January 1, 1970, when NY 216 was truncated to its current eastern terminus in Poughquag. As part of the truncation, its former alignment from West Pawling to Patterson was renumbered to NY 292.

== Major intersections ==
County	Location	mi	km	Destinations	Notes
Putnam	Patterson	0.00	0.00	NY 311 – Carmel	Southern terminus
Dutchess	Town of Pawling	7.58	12.20	NY 55	Northern terminus
1.000 mi = 1.609 km; 1.000 km = 0.621 mi
