= New York State Route 312 =

State highway in Putnam County, New York, US

New York State Route 312
- Map of Southeast with NY 312 highlighted in red

Route information
- Maintained by NYSDOT
- Length: 4.42 mi (7.11 km)
- Existed: 1930–present

Major junctions
- West end: US 6 in Southeast
- I-84 in Southeast
- East end: NY 22 in Southeast

Location
- Country: United States
- State: New York
- Counties: Putnam

Highway system
- New York Highways; Interstate; US; State; Reference; Parkways
← NY 311	→ NY 313

New York State Route 312 (NY 312) is a short state highway connecting U.S. Route 6 (US 6) and NY 22 within the town of Southeast in Putnam County, New York. It allows indirect access to the village of Brewster from Interstate 84 (I-84), and is often heavily used by local residents at rush hour in preference to the more complicated nearby access to I-684. The western terminus of the route is at US 6 roughly 2 miles (3.2 km) northwest of Brewster, and the eastern is in the hamlet of Sears Corners.

The designation NY 312 was originally assigned to what is now NY 164 as part of the 1930 renumbering of state highways in New York before being shifted south to its current location in 1937.

== Route description ==
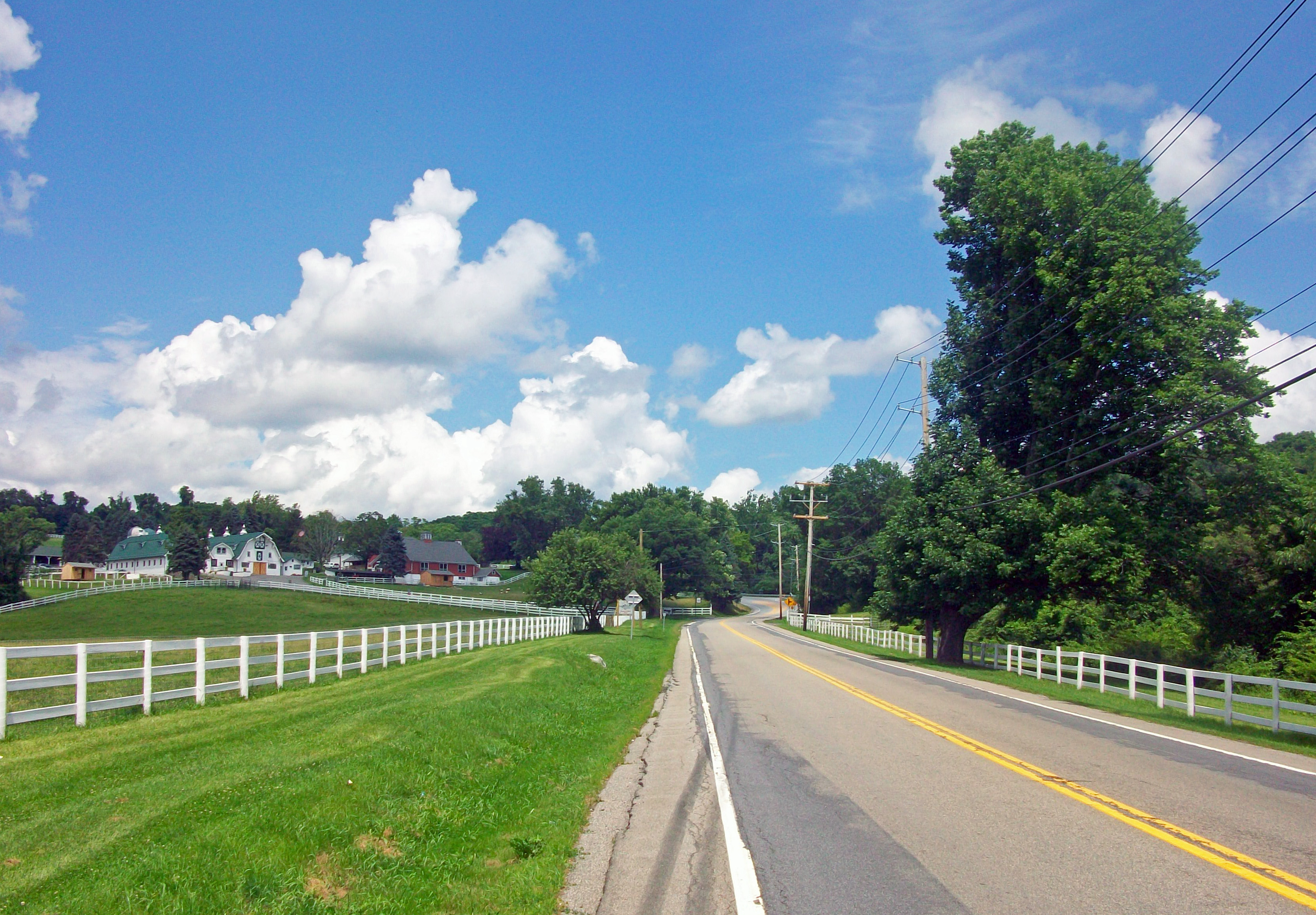
NY 312 at the Tilly Foster Farm

NY 312 begins at US 6 in Southeast, New York just northeast of Middle Branch Reservoir, one of the many reservoirs in Putnam County which supply New York City's large need for drinking water. The route heads northeast, before veering to the north after a 0.5 mile (0.8 km) to bypass a hill 680 feet (210 m) high. Past the hill, the route curves eastward then northeastward as it meets I-84 by way of an interchange and approaches the hamlet of Dykemans.

In Dykemans, NY 312 serves the Metro-North Railroad's Southeast station, located on the railroad's Harlem Line. Just north of the station, NY 312 turns almost due east as it crosses the Harlem Line at-grade and exits Dykemans. 0.5 miles (0.8 km) from the railroad crossing, the route intersects North Brewster Road (County Road 58 or CR 58) and Farm to Market Road (CR 62) in the hamlet of Brewster Hill. From here, it travels along the northern edge of Bog Brook Reservoir, another large reservoir which supplies drinking water to New York City. NY 312 proceeds east to the hamlet of Sears Corners, where it terminates at NY 22.

== History ==
All of modern NY 312 was originally designated as part of NY 52 in the 1930 renumbering of state highways in New York. At the same time, the NY 312 designation was assigned to the entirety of what is now NY 164. The NY 312 designation was shifted 3 miles (5 km) southward to its current alignment in May 1937 after NY 52 was truncated to Carmel. No changes have been made to NY 312's alignment since that time.

== Major intersections ==
The entire route is in Southeast, Putnam County.

mi	km	Destinations	Notes
0.00	0.00	US 6 – Brewster, Brewster station, Carmel	Western terminus
1.11	1.79	I-84 – Danbury, Newburgh, Southeast station	Exit 65 on I-84; access to Southeast station via Independent Way
4.42	7.11	NY 22 – White Plains, Pawling	Eastern terminus
1.000 mi = 1.609 km; 1.000 km = 0.621 mi
