= Interstate 84 in New York =

Segment of the eastern U.S. freeway in the state

Interstate 84
- Map of New York with I-84 highlighted in red

Route information
- Maintained by NYSDOT and NYSBA
- Length: 71.46 mi (115.00 km)
- Existed: 1963–present
- NHS: Entire route

Major junctions
- West end: I-84 at the Pennsylvania state line in Port Jervis
- US 6 / Route 23 in Port Jervis; US 6 / NY 17M in Middletown; Future I-86 / NY 17 in Middletown; I-87 Toll / New York Thruway / NY 300 in Newburgh; US 9W / NY 32 in Newburgh; US 9 in Fishkill; Taconic State Parkway in East Fishkill; I-684 / US 6 / US 202 / NY 22 in Southeast
- East end: I-84 at the Connecticut state line in Southeast

Location
- Country: United States
- State: New York
- Counties: Orange, Dutchess, Putnam

Highway system
- Interstate Highway System; Main; Auxiliary; Suffixed; Business; Future; New York Highways; Interstate; US; State; Reference; Parkways
← NY 83	→ NY 84

Interstate 84 (I-84) is a part of the Interstate Highway System that runs from Dunmore, Pennsylvania, to Sturbridge, Massachusetts, in the eastern United States. In New York, I-84 extends 71.46 miles (115.00 km) from the Pennsylvania state line at Port Jervis to the Connecticut state line east of Brewster. As it heads east–west across the mid Hudson Valley, it goes over two mountain ranges and crosses the Hudson River at the Newburgh–Beacon Bridge.

It is the only freeway to cross New York from west to east between New York City and the Capital District. As such it is the main vehicular route between southern New England and Pennsylvania and points west. It is maintained by the New York State Department of Transportation (NYSDOT), which resumed full control in 2010 after two decades in which routine maintenance was performed by the New York State Thruway Authority under yearly contract from DOT. The New York State Bridge Authority charges a toll for eastbound traffic crossing the Newburgh–Beacon Bridge.

Construction of the highway began later than other Interstates in New York as legal hurdles to the construction of the bridge had to be removed, and federal funding was more limited when it finally began in 1960. It was completed 12 years later, becoming a major commercial artery and mainstay of the Hudson Valley economy and offering travelers a view of some of the state's scenic areas in the Shawangunks and Hudson Highlands.

== Route description ==
I-84 passes through three counties. The entire stretch between the Delaware and Hudson, more than half the road's total length in New York alone, is in Orange County. East of the river the road begins in Dutchess County and then drops southward into Putnam County. As an Interstate Highway, all of I-84 in New York is included in the National Highway System, a network of roads important to the country's economy, defense, and mobility.

Two other highways parallel the Interstate for some length. U.S. Route 6 (US 6) follows it closely near the state lines, but takes a southerly course between those two areas. New York State Route 52 (NY 52) joins I-84 from Newburgh to Fishkill and remains parallel from there to Lake Carmel.

=== West of the Hudson River (Orange County) ===
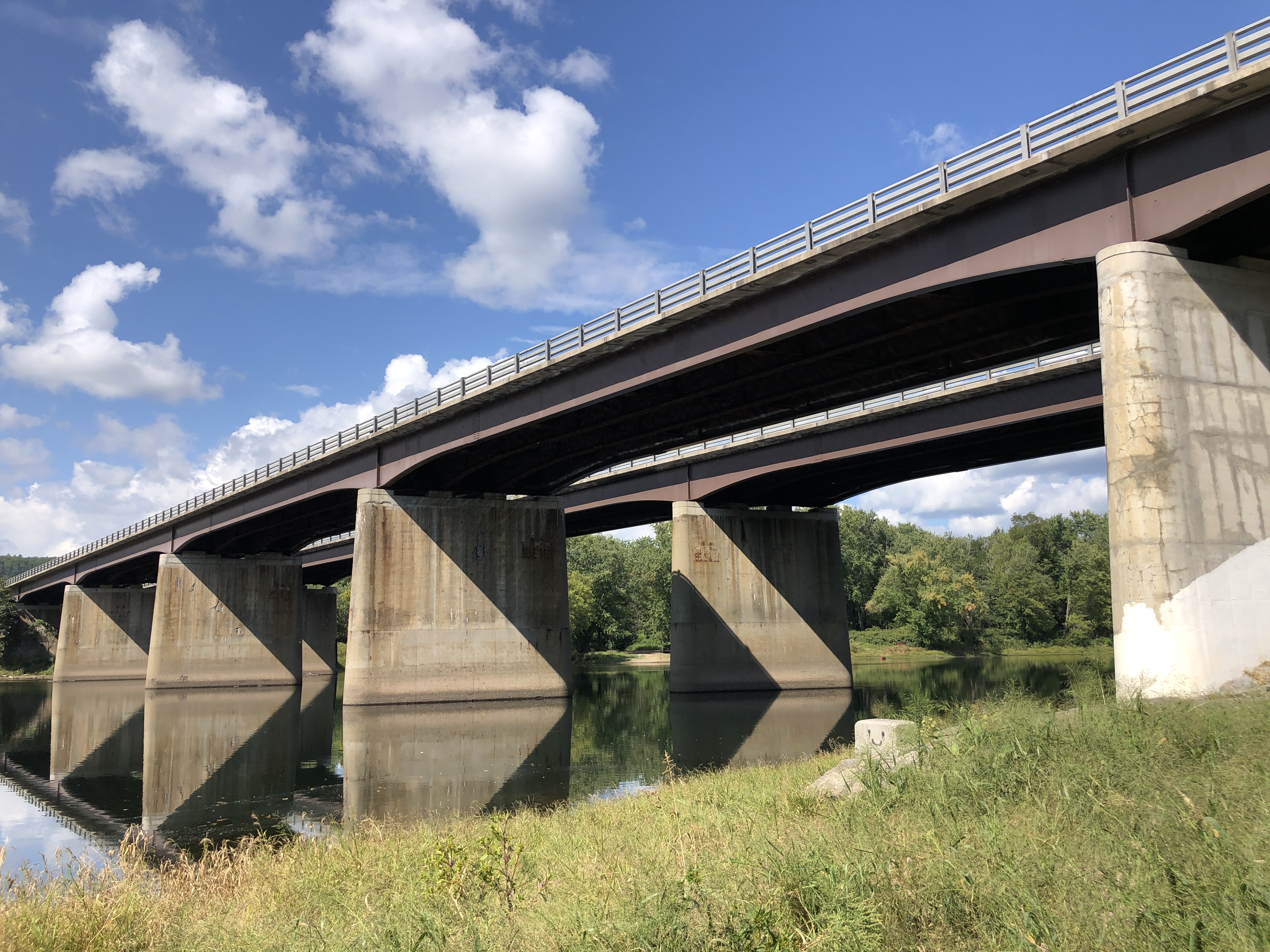
I-84 bridge over the Delaware River, with the Tri-State Rock in the foreground

I-84 enters New York near Port Jervis via a long bridge that crosses both the Delaware and Neversink rivers just above their confluence. This bridge is owned and maintained by the NYSDOT, including the portion in Pennsylvania. South of the road at the confluence is Tri-State Rock, where New Jersey, New York and Pennsylvania converge. For its first mile in New York, the Interstate is immediately north of the New Jersey state line in the city of Port Jervis. The first exit is signed for US 6 and New Jersey Route 23, which begins just south of the exit.

US 6 remains parallel to the north of the freeway as I-84 begins an immediate climb away from the state line up the Shawangunk Ridge, beginning an east-northeast slant in its direction that will continue for almost 30 miles (48 km). The roadway crests at 1,275 feet (389 m), its highest elevation in New York. Scenic overlooks on either side allow travelers to stop and take in the expansive view of Port Jervis, the lower Neversink valley and adjacent regions of Pennsylvania. On the descent, US 6 crosses under the Interstate again, reachable by a short drive south on Mountain Road at exit 4.

East of the Shawangunks it is 13 miles (21 km) to the next exit. The freeway winds through swamps from which the obelisk atop High Point, New Jersey's highest mountain, is visible. These give way to wooded areas eventually broken by fields in Wawayanda where Route 6 crosses over again to merge with NY 17M and recross at exit 15, the first of two that serve the city of Middletown. A mile and a half (2.4 km) further east along that roadway is the Middletown rest area, with restrooms and a state police substation. The other Middletown exit serves NY 17, the long freeway slowly being transformed into I-86, another mile farther to the east.

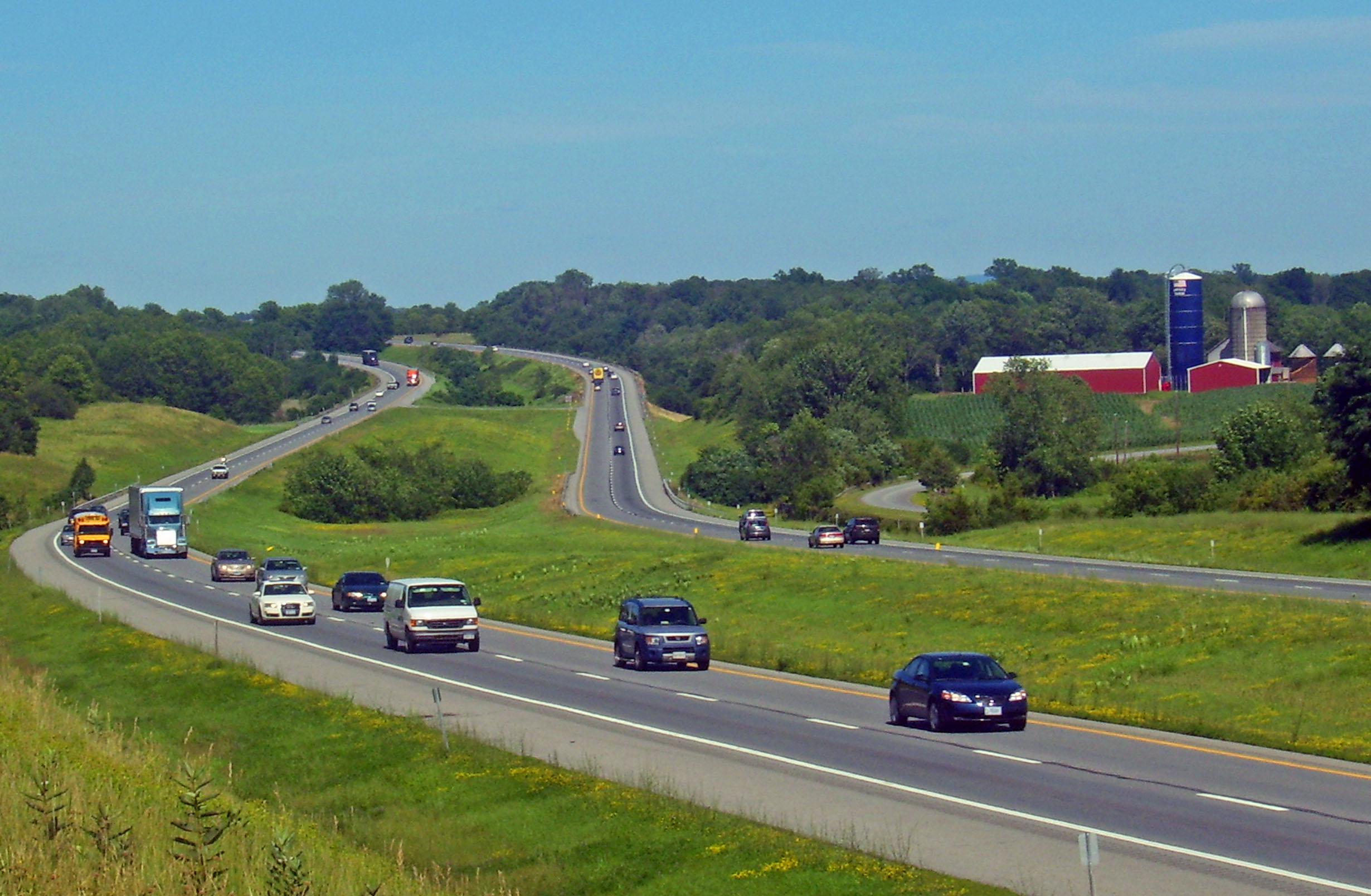
Farmland in central Orange County

This junction is the western corner of Orange County's "golden triangle" of Interstates, so-called for its attractiveness to businesses for their distribution centers. Immediately afterward I-84 passes between the Galleria at Crystal Run, the county's largest mall, and the eponymous office park to the south. More farms begin to break up the landscape off the road. Westbound traffic is served by the Wallkill rest area four miles (6 km) east of Route 17. The tracks of Metro-North Railroad's Port Jervis Line runs just north of the highway for a short distance, and NY 211 also parallels for several miles past the hills of Highland Lakes State Park.

After crossing the Wallkill River and NY 416, I-84 climbs slightly to its first exit in almost 10 miles (16 km), NY 208, serving nearby Walden and Maybrook. Heavy truck traffic at this exit reflects a nearby truck stop, Yellow Freight's (Now YRC) large presence in Maybrook, and rail-to-truck transload facility in the old Maybrook Freight train yard. In the area is a Staples warehouse north of the Interstate along NY 208 and numerous distribution centers (Home Depot, Do-it-Best and others) and truck terminals (including UPS, FedEx and 3 others), along an adjacent roadway on the south side. The highway continues, now almost due east, of this exit through more wooded area, forming the northern border of Stewart State Forest, for four miles (6.4 km) to the recently built exit with NY 747 intended to improve access to nearby Stewart International Airport.

A mile beyond, the road reaches the first of four exits serving Newburgh, the largest community along it in New York. It veers slightly to the north again after the interchange with NY 17K, which has been running parallel to the north since NY 208. Another truck stop is located off this exit, with a major FedEx and the U.S. Postal Service's Mid-Hudson General Mail Facility in the industrial park between the Interstate and the airport.

The freeway resumes its eastern heading again and descends a gentle slope to its junction with the New York State Thruway (I-87) and NY 300. Traffic was routed to the Thruway via a short section of 300 when the Interstate was built, but a major project to build a connector directly to the toll road was completed in December 2009, after being under construction for five years.

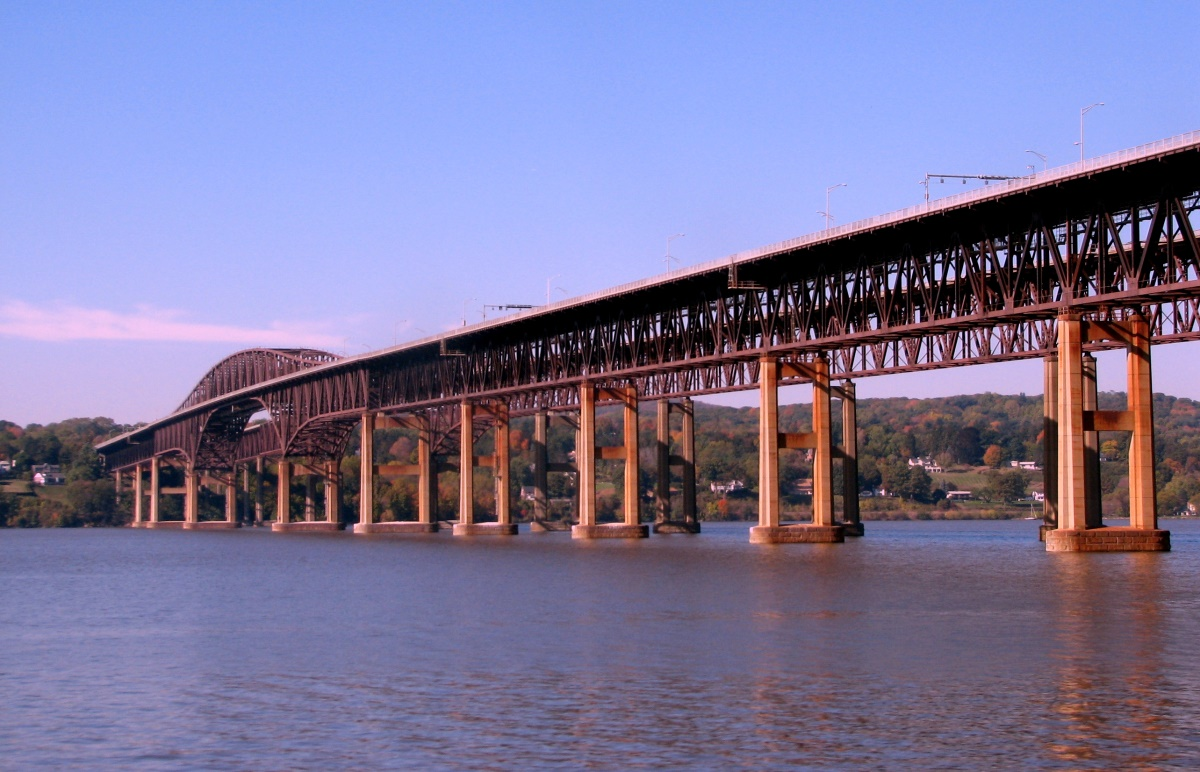
Newburgh–Beacon Bridge

After passing through a rock cut, I-84 levels off and begins following the northern border of the city of Newburgh, where first NY 52 joins it, beginning the only concurrency with the Interstate in the state. A mile and a half (2.4 km) east, US 9W and NY 32 provide the last exit before the road crosses the Newburgh–Beacon Bridge, with views of Newburgh Bay and the Hudson Highlands to the south.

=== East of the Hudson River (Dutchess and Putnam counties) ===
The bridge also crosses Metro-North's Hudson Line tracks on the east side of the river. The NY 9D exit after the toll plaza is the first of two serving the city of Beacon, just to the south of the freeway. It then curves slightly to the north, passing Dutchess Stadium, home of the Hudson Valley Renegades, to the north and then the large open area between Downstate and Fishkill state prisons, where signs warn motorists not to stop. To the south a panoramic view from Beacon to Schunemunk mountains is available.

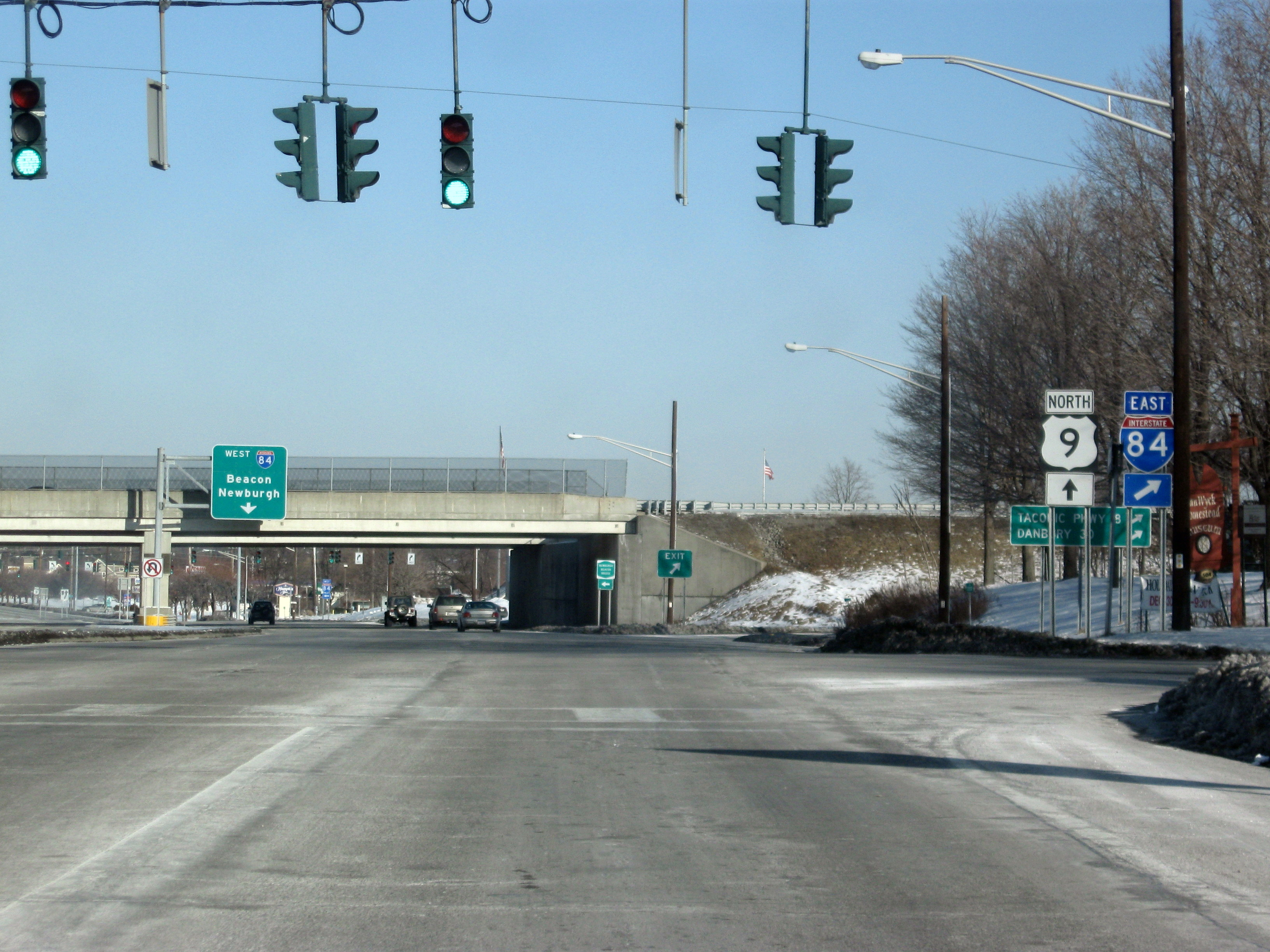
US 9 near I-84 in Fishkill

The road resumes its eastern heading and descends slightly to the next exit, where NY 52 leaves the freeway for the village of Fishkill. I-84 bends through the lowlands north of Sour Mountain, northern end of the Hudson Highlands, and crosses Fishkill Creek. Just north of the historic Van Wyck Homestead, and south of a large Old Navy regional distribution center, it intersects US 9, which becomes a divided highway from north of the exit to Poughkeepsie.

It begins to climb into the hills east of this exit, passing through some rock cuts in the four miles (6.4 km) to the Lime Kiln Road exit, which allows easy access to a nearby former IBM facility now known as Hudson Valley Research Park. From there it descends gently over two miles (3.2 km), with Hosner Mountain looming to the east, to the sprawling interchange with the Taconic State Parkway. It ascends again afterwards, passing scenic overlooks on either side that allow views of the valley and the Catskills to the northwest. At the crest, near where the Appalachian Trail crosses over, signs indicate the road has once again reached 1,000 feet (305 m) in elevation.

I-84 begins to veer to the south at this point, and soon it descends through some rock cuts to cross into Putnam County just before the Ludingtonville Road exit, with NY 52 a short distance to the south. The road heads in a more south-southeast direction the next 10 miles (16 km). The NY 311 exit offers the last connection to NY 52, a short distance to the south over Lake Carmel, and after crossing Metro-North's Harlem Line the interchange with NY 312 offers access to the large strip mall on a hill southeast of the exit and the Southeast train station.

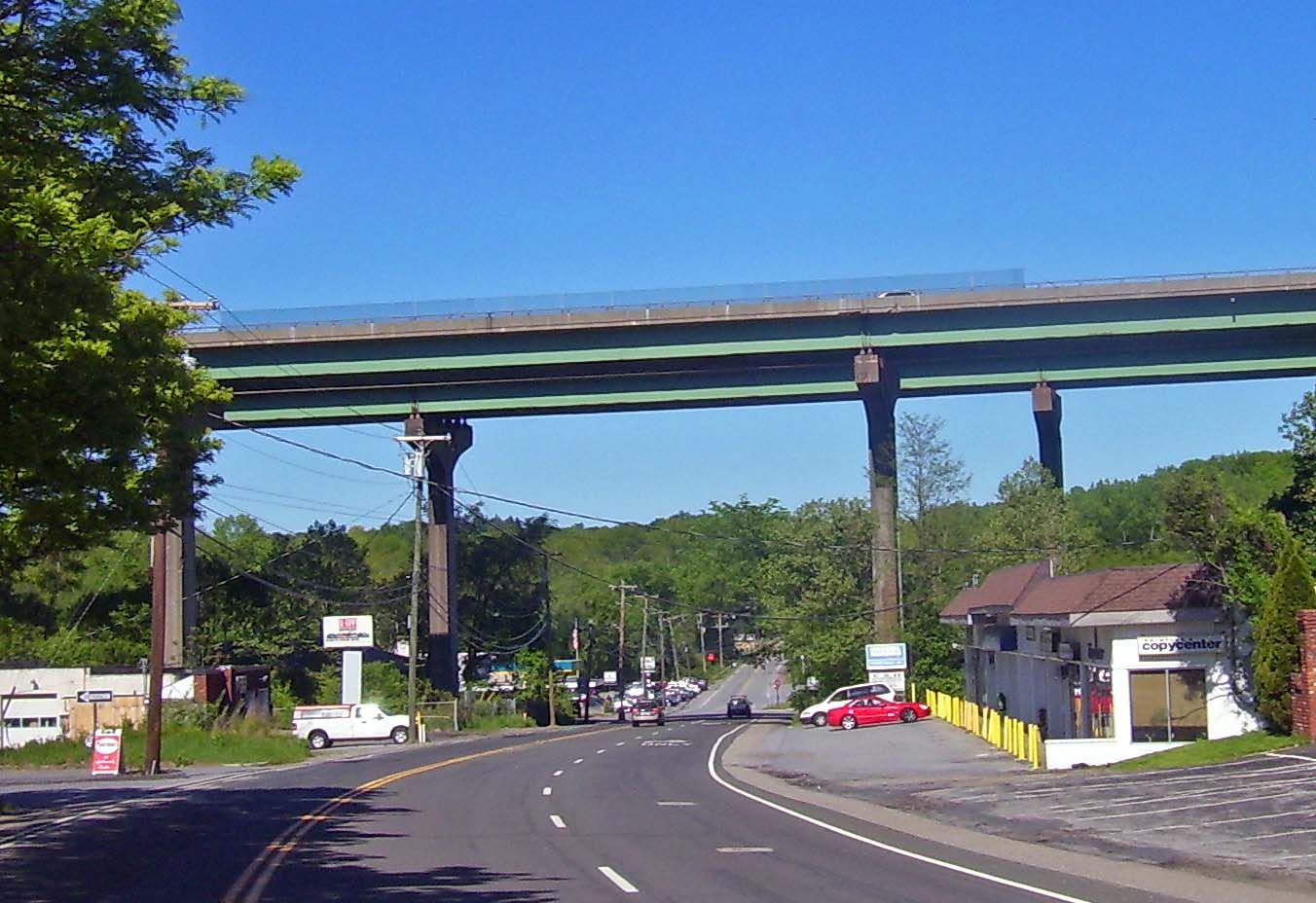
Long overpass at Brewster

After a quarter-mile-long (400 m) bridge over the Croton River, US 6, US 202 and NY 22 just north of Brewster, the Interstate returns to its eastern heading for the northern terminus of I-684, an exit that also provides access to the other three highways. For eastbound travelers this is the last exit in New York.

US 6 and US 202 closely parallel I-84 to the north, between the freeway and one of the upper basins of East Branch Reservoir, part of New York City's water supply system. The northern terminus of NY 121 lets eastbound traffic on and westbound traffic off. Two miles (3.2 km) to the east, Signs appear for Saw Mill Road, exit 1 on Connecticut's stretch of I-84, and its ramps leave the highway just a hundred feet (30 m) before the state line.

== History ==
=== 1950s: Planning ===
The route of what became I-84 through New York state began in the late 1940s, when the then-New York State Department of Public Works (now NYSDOT) was planning Gov. Thomas Dewey's proposed Thruway system. The plan was for the Thruway's main line to cross the river between Newburgh and Beacon, an area then in the middle of a 30-mile (48 km) gap in fixed river crossings. The remainder of the expressway would be toll-free.

Politicians in the Newburgh area had also been lobbying for a bridge over Newburgh Bay, as the ferry service in that section of the river was becoming financially nonviable. In 1951 they were able to authorize test boring in the riverbed to see if a bridge was feasible. It was, but their counterparts further up the river got legislation passed that prohibited any construction of the Newburgh Bay bridge until the Kingston–Rhinecliff Bridge was completed.

By the early 1950s the road plan had changed. The Thruway had been rerouted to cross the Hudson at the present site of the Tappan Zee Bridge. Dewey suggested that the future I-84 be built as a separate toll road instead. After the passage of the Federal Aid Highway Act of 1956, during the Averell Harriman administration, state officials changed it back to a free road in order to get federal funding for the project. It remained on paper as other New York Interstates got underway.

Assemblyman Lee Mailler of Cornwall, that body's majority leader, was able to get the bridge construction prohibition repealed in 1954. A bond issue the next year made the first money available for the construction of both the Kingston and Newburgh bridges. In 1959, it looked it would be delayed again when the federal funding formula was changed and less money was available, making a four-lane bridge too expensive to construct.

=== 1960s–70s: Construction ===
Construction began in 1960 after the new governor, Nelson Rockefeller, promised to expedite it during his campaign by building a single span, within the limits of what the state could afford without federal aid. The new plans called at first for a freeway connection for I-87 from Beacon to the Bronx and a concurrency across the river. After that project was cancelled after heavy local opposition. I-87 was routed to join I-84 at Brewster (where it would have followed the route of the current I-684).

The first segment, the 16 miles (26 km) between the Thruway mainline in the Town of Newburgh and US 9 in Fishkill, was opened November 2, 1963. The Newburgh–Beacon Bridge crossed nearly two miles (3.2 km) of Newburgh Bay and led to the last run of the original Newburgh–Beacon Ferry the day after it opened.

On December 11, 1963, the eastbound lanes of the section between US 9 in Fishkill and the Taconic State Parkway were opened as a two-lane highway, with the westbound lanes opened in the summer of the following year. On October 1, 1968, the section between NY 17M in New Hampton and NY 17 in Middletown was opened. On April 2, 1969, the section from the Taconic Parkway to NY 311 was opened. On August 27, 1970, the bridge over the Delaware River between Matamoras and Port Jervis was opened. On October 20, 1970, the section between Mountain Road in Greenville and NY 17M in New Hampton was opened. On May 12, 1971, the section between NY 311 and the interchange with I-684 in Brewster was opened, rendering all sections of the highway east of the Hudson River as open. The last segment to open was the one between NY 208 and the Thruway, on July 1, 1971.

==== Effect on western Orange County state highways ====
The highway's route number prompted the renumbering of several existing state routes in western Orange County, where there was already an NY 84. To avoid confusion, the NY 84 designation was eliminated and replaced with other routes in the mid-1960s. The portion south of US 6 at Slate Hill became NY 284 while the section of NY 84 north from Middletown to its northern terminus at NY 17K in Montgomery was added to NY 211, which had previously terminated at its junction with NY 17M and NY 84 in Middletown. The rest of NY 84 remained part of US 6 and NY 17M, which NY 84 had overlapped through Middletown. Lastly, NY 416 was truncated to its current northern terminus just south of Montgomery rather than ending at 17K as it had before. In addition, New Jersey renumbered its own Route 84 to Route 284 to match New York renumbering NY 84 to NY 284.

=== Improvements ===
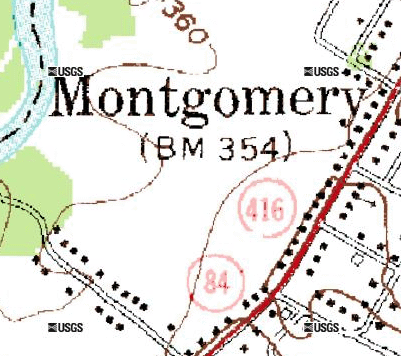
Closeup of mid-century USGS Montgomery quad showing NY 84/416 along current route of NY 211.

With I-84 complete soon after from Scranton to Hartford, the heavy traffic created traffic jams at the bottlenecks at either end of the Newburgh-Beacon Bridge. In 1975 a second span was approved. It was opened on November 1, 1980, almost 17 years to the day traffic first crossed the original span. Two lanes could still not handle all the traffic, and four years later, in 1984, the old bridge was reopened after renovations.

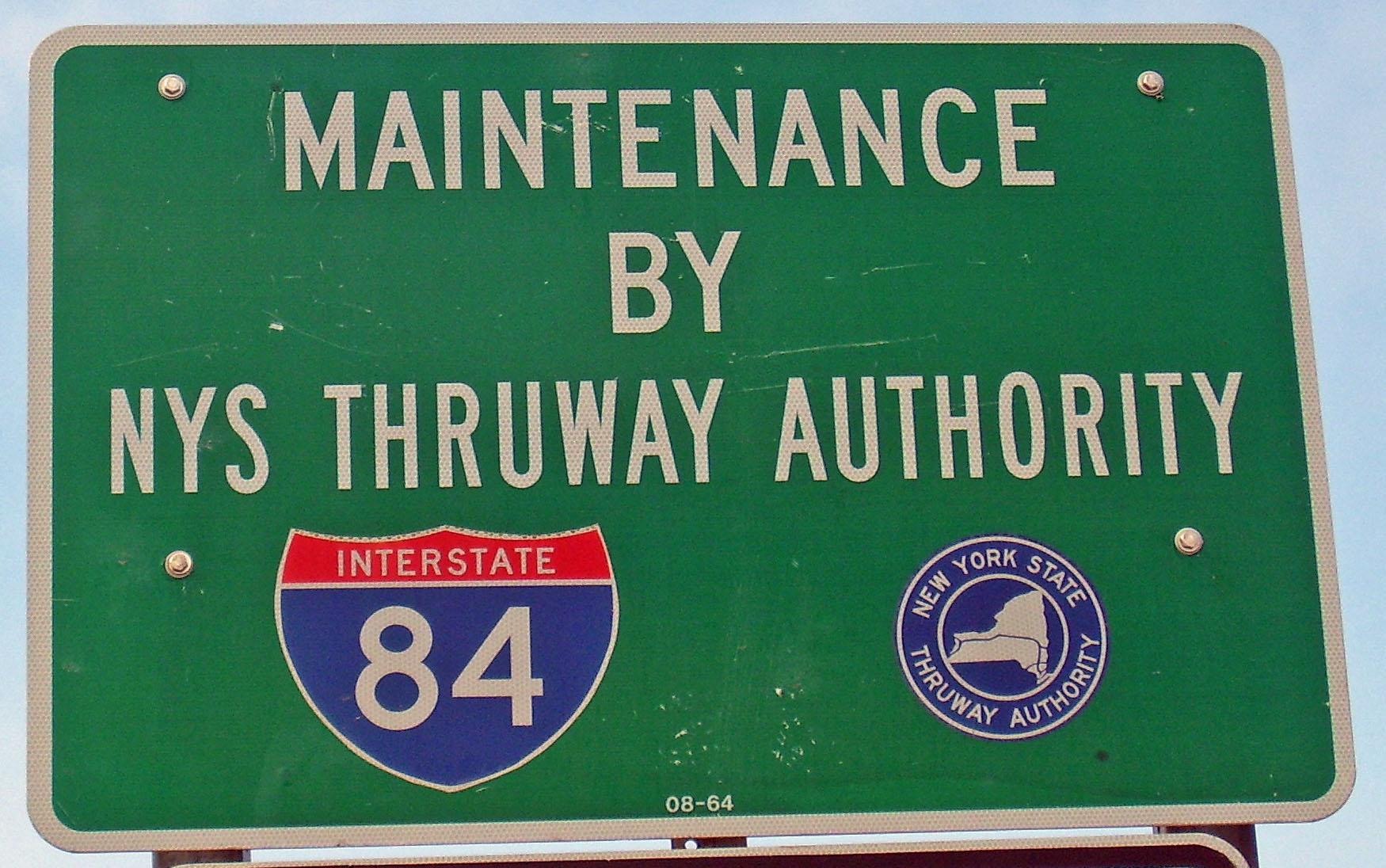
Thruway Authority maintenance sign at onramps, 1991–2010

In 1991, with New York facing a large budget deficit, Mario Cuomo's administration decided that the state DOT would essentially sell I-84 and the Cross-Westchester Expressway (I-287), to the cash-rich New York State Thruway Authority (NYSTA) as one way of closing it. No tolls could be charged since the roads were built with federal money, and the DOT remained in charge of large capital projects, but the Thruway Authority took over routine maintenance. During this time two interchanges were expanded and a new one created. The authority had the option of, at any time, returning the road to the state's control at a year's notice.

The first was the US 9 exit, revamped in 1999 at a cost of $25 million. I-84 was widened in both directions approaching the exit, a second overpass was added and the exit ramps were widened and signage improved. Around that time the two agencies also announced plans, and received federal funding, to redo the current exit 36 allowing traffic to go directly between I-84 and the Thruway instead of using a short stretch of NY 300, which by then was more heavily developed than it had been when the Interstates were first built. The three-phase construction project was initialized in May 2003 and completed in December 2009.

The new exit also replaced 13 old buildings with a few new ones: a separate toll plaza to handle traffic entering the Thruway (the existing toll plaza is now dedicated to exiting traffic), offices and garages for NYSTA and the New York State Police. The new buildings use green techniques to minimize energy use such daylighting and rainwater collection. The ramps have been rerouted, using six new bridges and five new miles (8.0 km) of roadway, so that almost all traffic from routes 17K and 300 now use the latter route to access both Interstates. The existing connector from the toll plaza to NY 17K remains as an E-ZPass–only lane from that highway to the northbound Thruway.

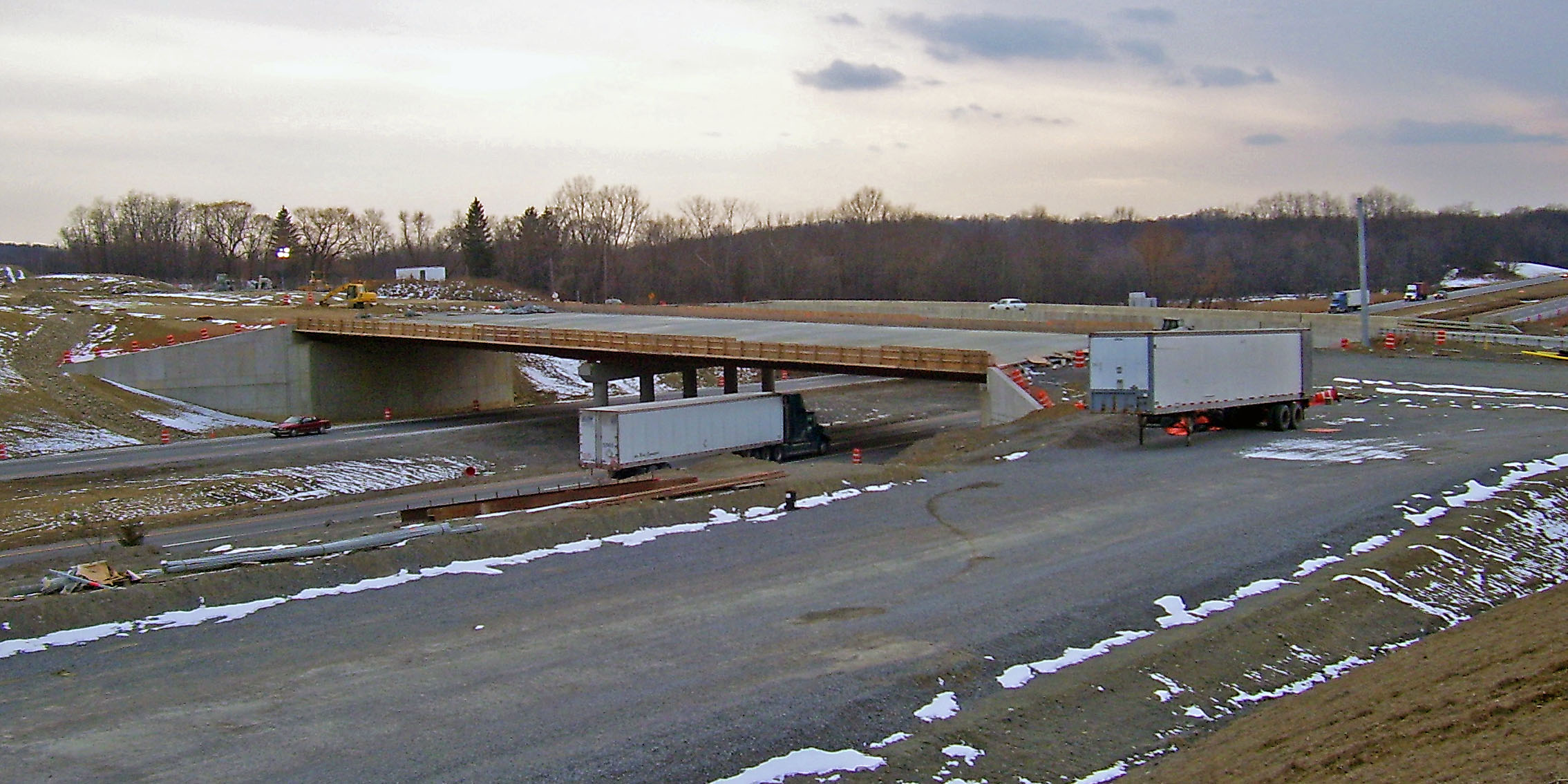
Exit 32 (formerly exit 5A) under construction in early 2007

After lengthy litigation by environmental groups concerned about the impact on nearby Stewart State Forest, in 2005 construction began on exit 32 (then exit 5A). Local road Drury Lane was upgraded and widened into newly designated NY 747 to allow easier access to Stewart International Airport via an almost-full diamond interchange. It was completed in November 2007, at the same time the briefly privatized airport was turned over to the Port Authority of New York and New Jersey with the intent of making it the New York City metropolitan area's fourth major airport.

The Thruway Authority's involvement with the road would have ended in 2006 when its board voted to transfer the highway back to the state DOT, a move it suggested did not commit it to doing so. The proceeds would have covered NYSTA's expenses in eliminating the toll barrier for a year on I-190 south of Buffalo. This was seen as an election-year move to help Republican candidates in Western New York. But residents of the mid-Hudson region felt NYSTA had done a better job plowing the road in winter, and Thruway workers assigned to I-84 feared having to move or working for the DOT at lower pay and with different union representation.

State Senator John Bonacic, a member of that body's then-Republican majority whose district covers western Orange County, introduced legislation at the beginning of 2007 to block the changeover. He succeeded, as the budget lawmakers and new governor Eliot Spitzer agreed to appropriate enough money for DOT to continue paying the Thruway Authority for snow removal, litter pickup and mowing along the entire highway save the bridge. The DOT picked up the cost of having state police Troop T, which patrols the Thruway, continue to cover I-84. This agreement was renewed in 2008.

In 2010, maintenance fully reverted to DOT. With the state facing financial difficulties in the slow economy, Governor David Paterson decided that DOT could save a few million dollars doing the work itself. In August of that year, the department bought $6 million worth of new equipment and hired 54 new employees to handle maintenance duties on the highway. In October 2010, Thruway insignia and signs indicating its maintenance responsibilities were removed from the roadway, and authority employees assigned to the road began transferring to jobs elsewhere, after the union waived several contract provisions to smooth the transfer. New York State Troopers who patrolled the road were reassigned from Thruway-based Troop T to Troop F in Orange County and Troop K in Dutchess and Putnam Counties, which cover the west and east sides of the Hudson respectively. At the DOT's request, the two state police substations in Wallkill and East Fishkill remained open.

In 2019, a $13.9 million project was completed that rebuilt the overpass carrying traffic over US 9W in Newburgh, in order to provide better clearance for truck traffic below on Route 9W and to meet current interstate highway standards.

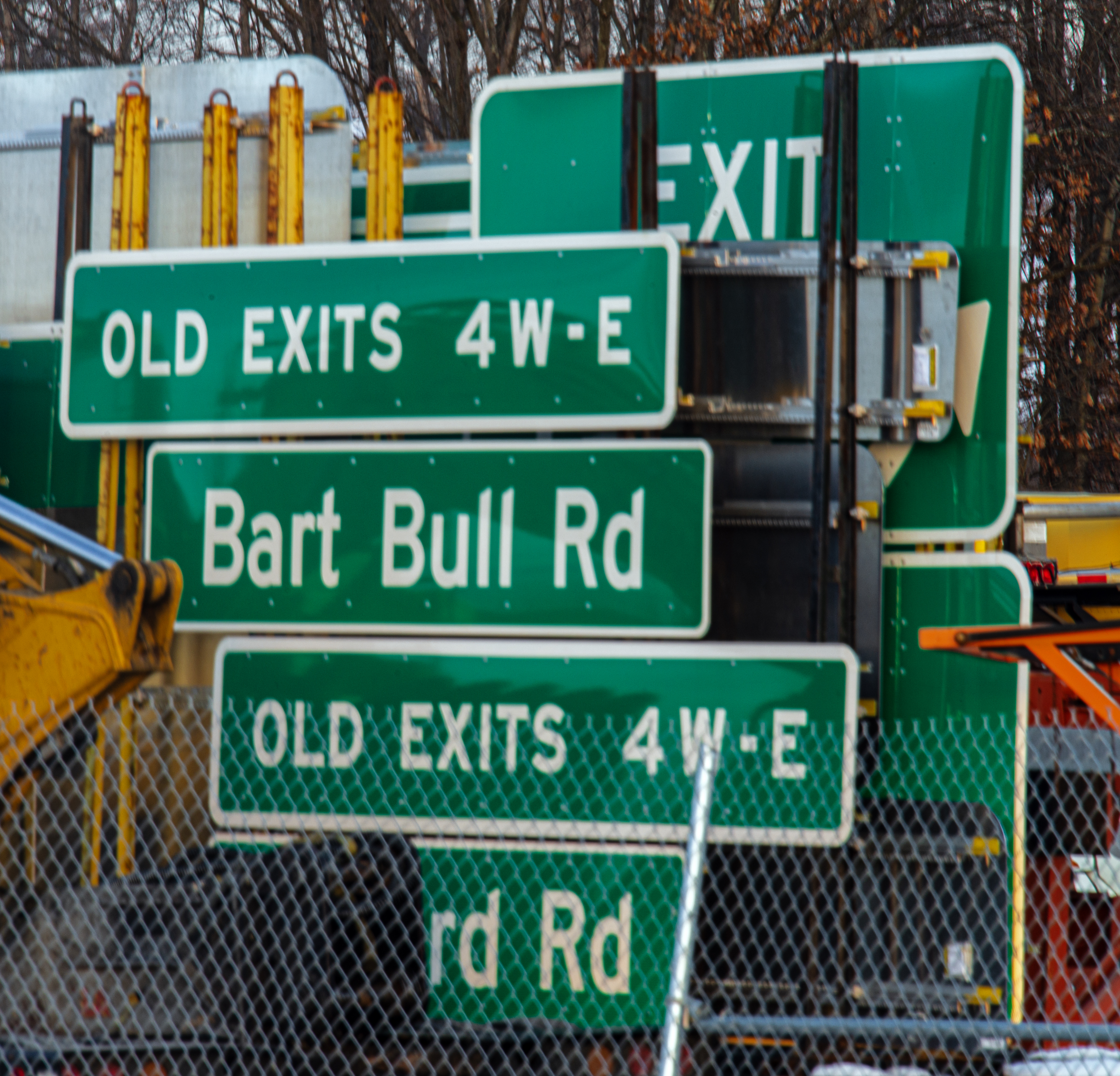
Signage awaiting installation during the renumbering, stored in Newburgh

Also in 2019, the exits were renumbered from sequential to mile-based as part of a sign replacement project by NYSDOT, in accordance with MUTCD regulations. The Putnam County section of I-84 was changed to mile-based in June, with Dutchess County's exits renumbered before September 2. As of February 2020 exits west of the Hudson have been fully renumbered up to the NY 17 interchange. Eastbound, NY 208 is fully renumbered in that direction but has both exit numbers on its signage approaching eastbound.

=== Incidents ===
Many traffic accidents, some fatal, have caused traffic jams and closures since I-84 was opened. One was notable for the type of vehicle involved; another led to a still-open murder investigation.

==== Air accident ====
On August 6, 1976, drivers along I-84 near exit 18 (NY 311; now exit 61) in the Putnam County town of Patterson saw a low-flying helicopter cross over the Interstate and then get entangled in the power lines passing overhead. The craft flipped over and fell onto the eastbound lanes of the highway. Both pilot and passenger were killed, and 4,000 customers in the area lost power. A traffic backup of several miles was rerouted onto the road's shoulder around the crash site until the road was reopened two and a half hours later. The National Transportation Safety Board investigated and ruled the cause to be pilot error.

==== Murder investigation ====
Sketch of the man Aderson described as his killer.

A road rage incident on the side of the highway led to the death of Richard Aderson in 1997. Aderson, an assistant superintendent at the Valley Central School District in Montgomery, was returning to his LaGrange home on the evening of February 5, 1997, when he had a minor collision with a relatively new green Jeep Cherokee carrying what appeared to be New Hampshire license plates just before crossing the Newburgh–Beacon Bridge. The two drivers pulled over near what was then exit 12 (now exit 44), and after a brief argument the other driver shot Aderson and left the scene. Aderson was able to give the 9-1-1 operator he called on his cell phone a description of his assailant and the vehicle before dying at the scene. A police sketch based on Aderson's description has been widely circulated and is still posted prominently in kiosks at the freeway's rest areas. The case has been dramatized on both America's Most Wanted and Unsolved Mysteries.

==== 2023 bus crash ====
On September 21, 2023, a chartered bus carrying ninth-grade members of the Farmingdale High School marching band from Long Island to a weekend at a camp in Pennsylvania suffered a tire failure along westbound I-84 in Wawayanda near Slate Hill and rolled down a 50-foot (15 m) slope into the highway's median strip. Many students were injured, some critically, and two adults on the bus were killed. The highway was closed in both directions between exits 4 and 15 (formerly exits 2 and 3), with traffic diverted onto US 6, in order to clear the accident and create a landing zone for helicopters to evacuate the most seriously injured to Westchester Medical Center. At the end of the year, the Federal Highway Administration approved the addition of a crash gate for emergency vehicles, the absence of which had hampered response to the crash, along that stretch of the interstate.

== Exit list ==
I-84 exits within New York were changed from sequential numbering to mile-based numbering in 2019.

County	Location	mi	km	Old exit	New exit	Destinations	Notes
Delaware River		0.00	0.00	–	–	I-84 west – Scranton	Continuation into Pennsylvania
Orange	Town of Deerpark	0.66	1.06	–	1	US 6 / Route 23 south – Port Jervis, Sussex	Access to Route 23 via CR 15; northern terminus of Route 23
Orange	Greenville	3.40	5.47	Parking Area			
Orange	Greenville	4.76	7.66	2	4	Mountain Road (CR 35)	
Orange	Wawayanda	15.44	24.85	3	15	US 6 / NY 17M – Goshen, Middletown	Signed as exits 15A (US 6/NY 17 M east) and 15B (US 6/NY 17 M west)
Orange	Wawayanda	16.90	27.20	Middletown Rest Area (eastbound)			
Orange	Wallkill	19.10	30.74	4	19	Future I-86 / NY 17 – New York City, Binghamton	Signed as exits 19A (NY 17 east) and 19B (NY 17 west); exits 121E and 121W on NY 17
Orange	Wallkill	23.63	38.03	Middletown Rest Area (westbound)			
Orange	Montgomery	28.78	46.32	5	28	NY 208 – Maybrook, Walden	To Orange County Airport
Orange	Town of Newburgh	32.99	53.09	5A	32	NY 747 – Stewart Airport	Exit opened in 2007
Orange	Town of Newburgh	34.14	54.94	6	34	NY 17K – Montgomery, Newburgh	To Stewart Air National Guard Base
Orange	Town of Newburgh	36.54	58.81	7A	36A	I-87 Toll / New York Thruway – Albany, New York City	Exit 17 on I-87 / Thruway; exit opened in 2009
Orange	Town of Newburgh	36.54	58.81	7B	36B	NY 300 (Union Avenue)	To NY 17K
Orange	Town of Newburgh	37.44	60.25	8	37	NY 52 west – Walden	Western end of NY 52 concurrency
Orange	Town of Newburgh	39.04	62.83	10	39	US 9W / NY 32 – Newburgh, Highland	Signed as exits 39A (US 9W south) and 39B (US 9W north) westbound; last eastbound exit before toll; to Newburgh–Beacon Ferry
Hudson River		40.23	64.74	Hamilton Fish Newburgh–Beacon Bridge (eastbound toll gantry)			
Dutchess	Town of Fishkill	41.49	66.77	11	41	NY 9D / NY 52 Bus. east – Beacon, Wappingers Falls, Cold Spring	To Beacon station and Newburgh–Beacon Ferry
Dutchess	Town of Fishkill	44.77	72.05	12	44	NY 52 east / NY 52 Bus. west – Fishkill	Eastern end of NY 52 concurrency; NY 52 Bus. not signed
Dutchess	Town of Fishkill	46.24	74.42	13	46	US 9 – Poughkeepsie, Peekskill	Signed as exits 46A (US 9 south) and 46B (US 9 north) westbound; to Hudson Valley Regional Airport
Dutchess	East Fishkill	50.44	81.18	15	50	CR 27 (Lime Kiln Road / iPark Boulevard)	
Dutchess	East Fishkill	52.64	84.72	16	52	Taconic State Parkway – New York City, Albany	Signed as exits 52A (Taconic State Parkway south) and 52B (Taconic State Parkway north); exits 37A and 37B on Taconic State Parkway
Dutchess	East Fishkill	55.20	88.84	Stormville Rest Area			
Dutchess–Putnam county line	East Fishkill–Kent line	58.84	94.69	17	58	NY 52 / CR 43 south (Ludingtonville Road)	NY 52 not signed; northern terminus of CR 43
Putnam	Kent–Patterson line	61.80	99.46	18	61	NY 311 – Lake Carmel, Patterson	
Putnam	Southeast	65.44	105.32	19	65	NY 312 – Carmel, Brewster	To Southeast station; former NY 52; Brewster not signed westbound
Putnam	Southeast	68.30	109.92	20	68	I-684 south / NY 22 – White Plains, New York City, Pawling	Signed as exits 68A (I-684 south) and 68B (NY 22 north) eastbound; exits 9E and 9W on I-684
Putnam	Southeast	69.26	111.46	21	69	NY 121 to US 6 / US 202 – North Salem, Brewster	Westbound exit and eastbound entrance
Putnam	Southeast	71.46	115.00	–	–	I-84 east – Danbury	Continuation into Connecticut
1.000 mi = 1.609 km; 1.000 km = 0.621 mi: Concurrency terminus; Electronic toll collection; Incomplete access

== See also ==
Interstate 84
Previous state: Pennsylvania	New York	Next state: Connecticut
