= New York State Route 311 =

State highway in Putnam County, New York, US

New York State Route 311
- NY 311 highlighted in red

Route information
- Maintained by NYSDOT
- Length: 6.14 mi (9.88 km)
- Existed: 1930–present

Major junctions
- West end: NY 52 in Kent
- I-84 in Patterson
- East end: NY 22 in Patterson

Location
- Country: United States
- State: New York
- Counties: Putnam

Highway system
- New York Highways; Interstate; US; State; Reference; Parkways
← NY 310	→ NY 312

New York State Route 311 (NY 311) is a state highway located entirely within Putnam County, New York, in the United States. It begins at NY 52 in Lake Carmel, and intersects Interstate 84 (I-84) shortly thereafter. It crosses NY 164 and NY 292 as it heads into the northeastern part of the county, finally curving east to reach its northern terminus at NY 22 just south of the Dutchess County line. The route passes several historical sites.

Part of modern-day Route 311 was originally the Philipstown Turnpike, a road built in 1815 to overcome a lack of transportation when the Hudson River froze during the winter months. The turnpike was a large business center for the county, though it was abandoned due to insufficient tolls to maintain it. Another section was constructed in the early 1900s, from the Patterson Baptist Church near the modern-day intersection of Route 311 and Route 164 to the Village of Patterson, by a group of Italian immigrants.

In the 1930 renumbering of state highways in New York, the segment of former NY 39 east of West Patterson was renumbered to NY 311. NY 52 was realigned c. 1937 to follow its current alignment between Stormville and Lake Carmel. The former routing of NY 52 from West Patterson to Lake Carmel became part of an extended NY 311.

== Route description ==
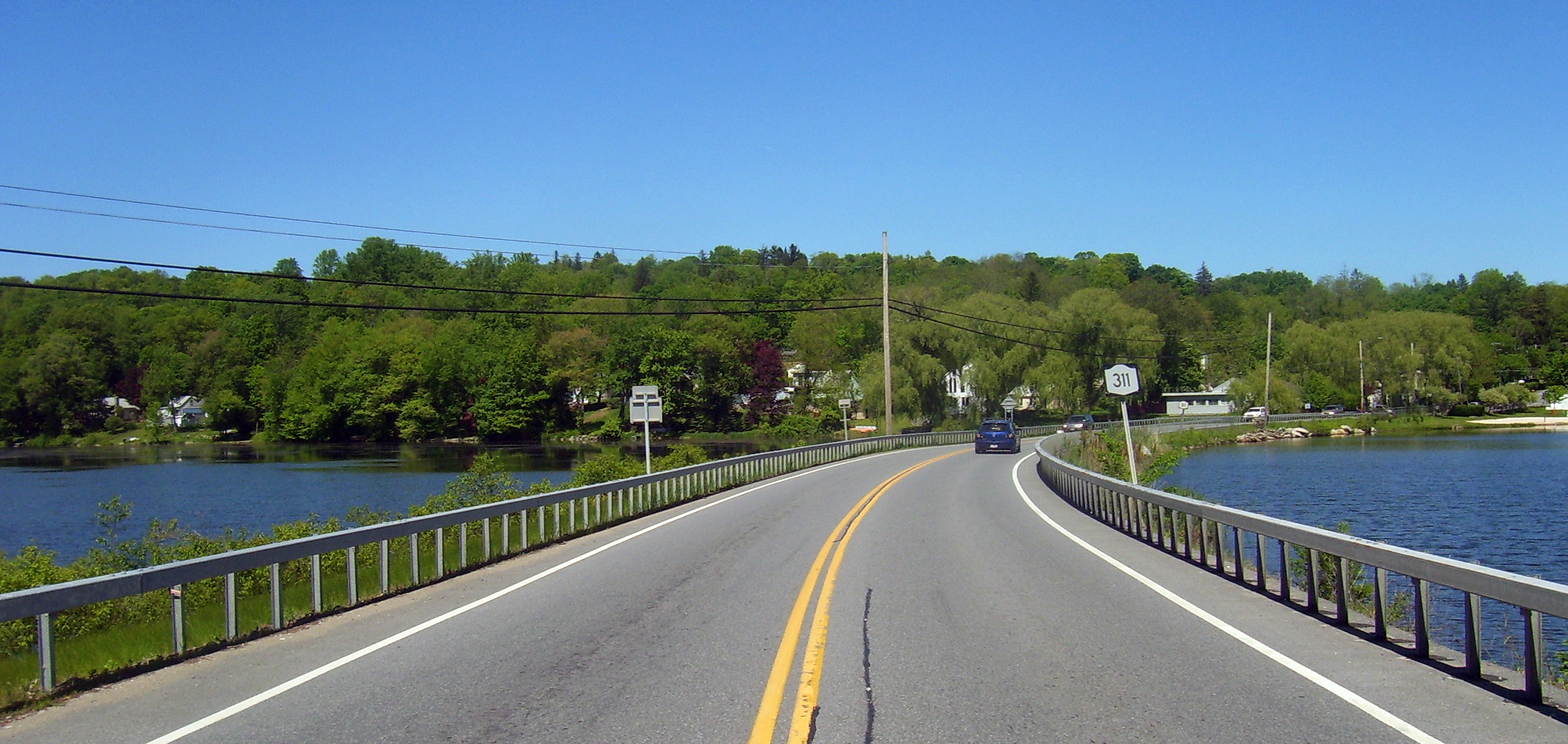
NY 311 crossing Lake Carmel

NY 311 begins at NY 52 in the town of Kent hamlet of Lake Carmel. It heads northeast, crossing over the northernmost portion of Lake Carmel on a short causeway. The lake has a surface area of about 200 acres (81 ha), and it sits at 618 feet (188 m) in elevation. It was created by developers in the early 20th century by damming the Middle Branch of the Croton River, and is one of the few large bodies of water in Putnam County not used as a reservoir by New York City. The road then crosses into the town of Patterson and passes over I-84 by way of an interchange. Construction is planned to start in summer 2012 for general bridge rehabilitation of the I-84 interchange. Proceeding eastward, hilly terrain causes it follow an erratic path. After passing a Christian youth camp it intersects with NY 164.

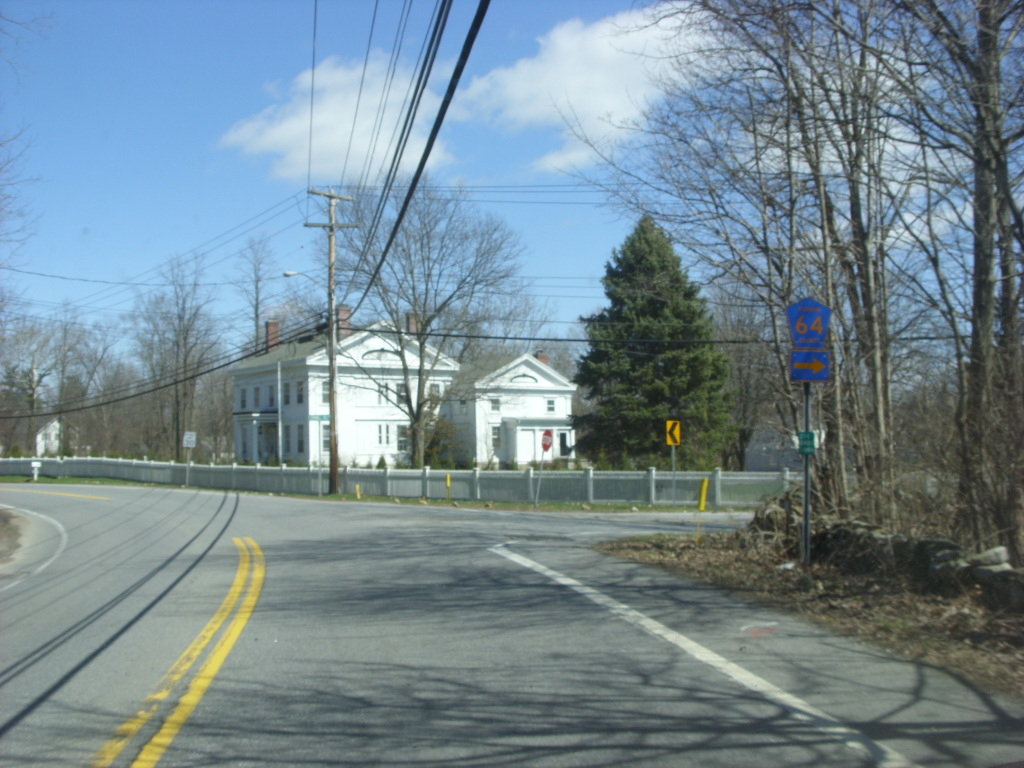
The junction with CR 64

NY 311 curves gradually northeast before turning almost due north to an intersection with NY 292 in the community of West Patterson. Past NY 292, NY 311 parallels the Putnam–Dutchess county line east into the hamlet of Patterson, serving as the main street of the community. After crossing the Harlem Line tracks, NY 311 crosses the East Branch Croton River at the north end of the wetland area known as the Great Swamp. At nearly 6,000 acres (2,400 ha), the Great Swamp is the second largest wetland in New York, extending as far north as Dover in Dutchess County. Continuing eastward, NY 311 passes the Patterson Fire Department, and terminates at NY 22 at a junction known as Akins Corners. In the hamlet of Patterson, an historic district exists along the route. A number of historic sites are located on NY 311, including the Patterson Presbyterian Church, the Fellowship Hall, Christ Episcopal Church, the Maple Avenue Cemetery and the Grange Hall.

== History ==
=== Pre-designation history ===
Part of modern-day NY 311 from the NY 292 intersection to the route's ending terminus was once part of the Philipstown Turnpike. Initially, the county's proximity to the Hudson River supplied cheap means of transporting goods to Albany and New York City, though in the winter months, the river froze over. To resolve the issue, in 1815, the Philipstown Turnpike Company was organized to improve upon a toll road from Cold Spring to the Connecticut border. On April 15, 1815, "an act to incorporate the Philipstown turnpike company in the county of Putnam" was passed. East of the Connecticut border, the turnpike continued as the New Milford and Sherman Turnpike. On the turnpike, wagons transported manufactures inland, and carried produce from the eastern part of the county. Before the advent of the railroad, the road was a business center for much of the county. One of the intentions of the turnpike was to "greatly promote the public good, as well contribute to their individual interest". However, the turnpike proved unprofitable and was eventually abandoned.

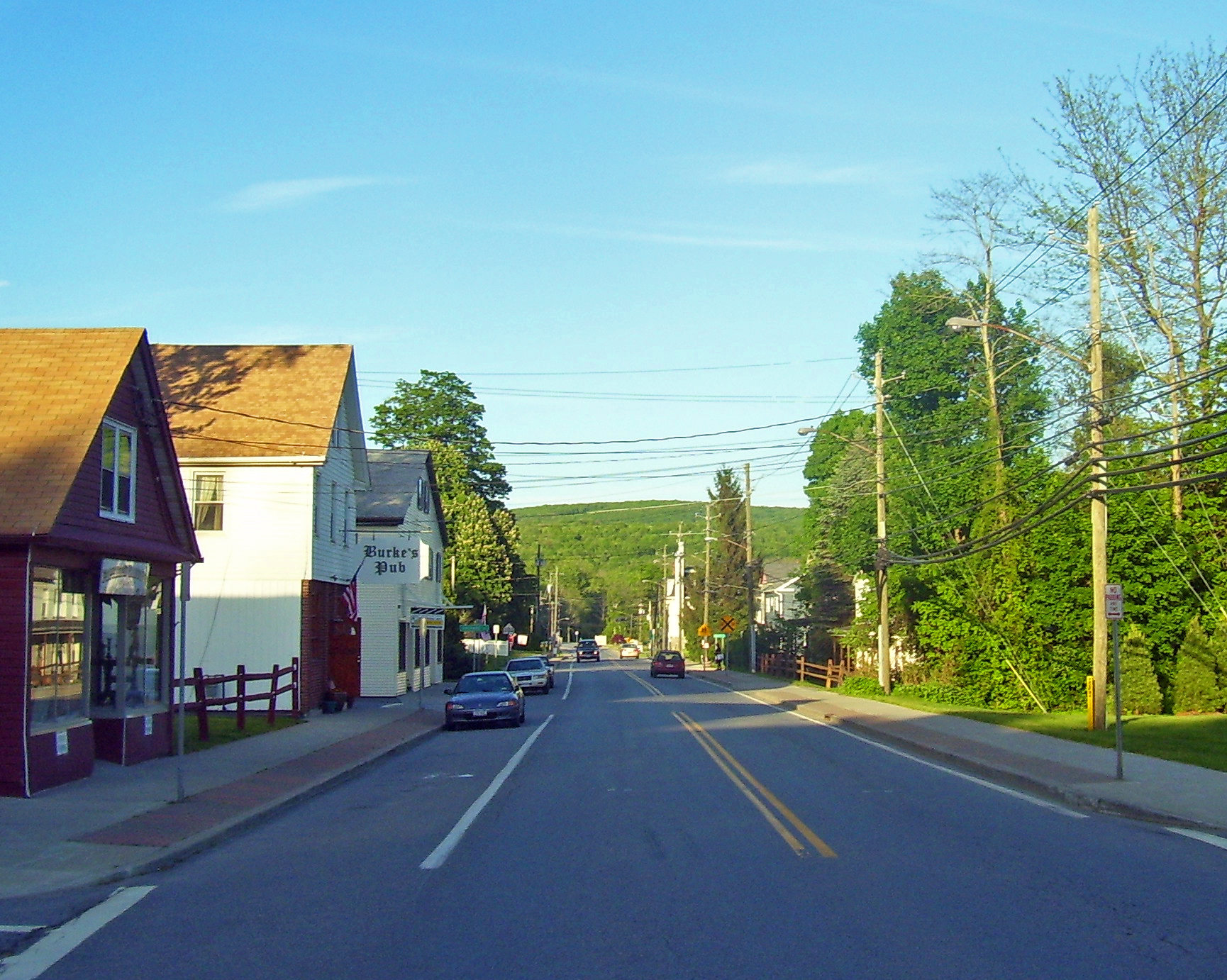
Looking east on NY 311 in Patterson

In November 1901, the Putnam County's Board of Supervisors hired an engineer to create plans for a new road that would run from the Westchester–Putnam County border into Dutchess County. By early the next year, a group of engineers led by H. W. Degaff surveyed the region, with the goal of constructing a 16-foot (4.9 m) wide road. In October 1902, the Board of Supervisors was informed that the engineers planned to build the new road along a path similar to an existing road. Surveys were completed in 1907, resulting in the elimination of a dangerous railroad crossing via a trestle. Actual construction began on the Patterson portion of the state road in April 1909, beginning from the Patterson Baptist Church near the modern-day intersection of NY 311 and NY 164. The working crew was composed of Italian immigrants, some of whom were given temporary residence within the Putnam Cigar Factory. By June, construction had reached the Village of Patterson, completing the project.

=== Designation ===
The portion of modern NY 311 from NY 292 in West Patterson and NY 22 in Patterson was designated in the mid-1920s as part of NY 39, an east–west route extending from Poughkeepsie to Patterson via East Fishkill and West Pawling. In the 1930 renumbering of state highways in New York, the segment of NY 39 east of West Patterson was renumbered to NY 311 while the portion of 1920s NY 39 from East Fishkill to West Patterson became part of NY 52. NY 52 also continued south from West Patterson through what is now Lake Carmel to Carmel, where it continued east on an overlap with U.S. Route 6 (US 6).

In March 1936, a "great and unusual ice flood" caused local water levels to rise. The bridge carrying the highway over the Great Swamp received cracks in its foundation due to the pressure of the water and melting ice, and was lifted off its foundation and swept into the swamp. NY 52 was realigned c. 1937 to follow its current alignment between Stormville and Lake Carmel. The former routing of NY 52 from West Patterson to Lake Carmel became part of an extended NY 311.

=== Recent history ===
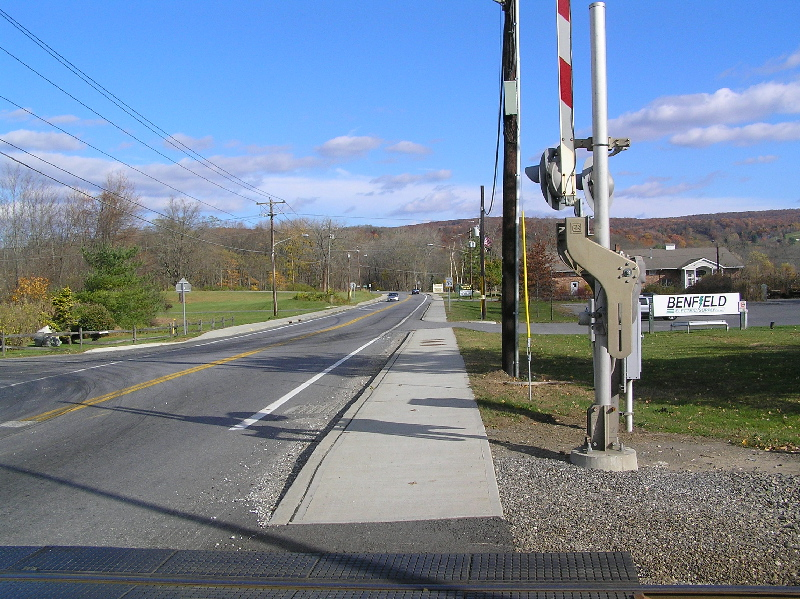
The NY 311 Harlem Line railroad crossing

In June 1960, the Presbyterian Men's Club produced a film called Our Town, part of which was filmed on the Main Street portion of NY 311 at Boot Hill, a replica western frontier town. Children were asked to participate in the filming by dressing in western or American Indian apparel; girls dressed as frontier women. The film debuted at the Patterson Town Hall on September 24, 1960.

By 1966, Putnam County's men began drafting into the armed forces to fight in the Vietnam War. In November of that year, Local Board No. 14 announced that 21 local men would be drafted into the military, the highest total to be called since the Korean War. Of the 21, two were residents of Patterson. To honor the Patterson veterans who lost their lives, a plaque commemorating the Vietnam War was added to the War Memorial by the American Legion at the intersection of NY 311 and Maple Avenue.

The Patterson Post Office underwent several re-locations throughout the years. After the Lloyd Lumber Company moved to a larger building along NY 311, the post office occupied the smaller structure; both were situated on the east side of the New York Central tracks. Residents complained that the new location was inadequate, claiming that parking was insufficient at nearby companies, and that walking along a busy road to reach the post office was dangerous. After a bidding process to determine the future location, the office was again moved to a former car service station along Front Street.

== Major intersections ==
The entire route is in Putnam County.

Location	mi	km	Destinations	Notes
Kent	0.00	0.00	NY 52 – Carmel, Fishkill	Western terminus; hamlet of Lake Carmel
Patterson	1.09	1.75	I-84 – Danbury, Newburgh	Diamond interchange; exit 61 on I-84
Patterson	2.57	4.14	NY 164 east – Towners	Western terminus of NY 164
Patterson	4.78	7.69	NY 292 north – Holmes	Southern terminus of NY 292; hamlet of Patterson
Patterson	6.14	9.88	NY 22 – Pawling, Brewster	Eastern terminus; hamlet of Akins Corners
1.000 mi = 1.609 km; 1.000 km = 0.621 mi
