= Patterson, New York =

- Town
- Town of Patterson
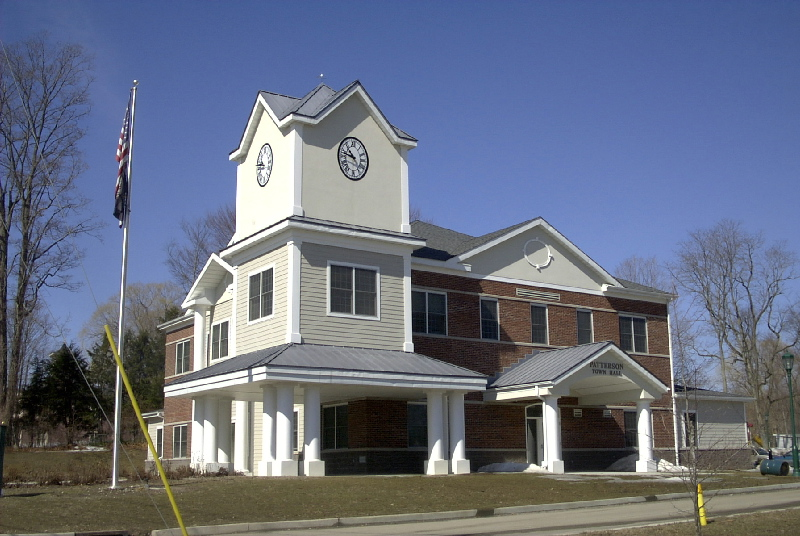
- Town Hall

- Seal
- Etymology: after local farmer Mathew Paterson
- Location of Patterson, New York

- Location of New York in the United States
- Coordinates: 41°28′50″N 73°35′50″W
- Country: United States
- State: New York
- County: Putnam
- Founded: 1795

Government
  - Supervisor: Richard Williams

Area
  - Total: 32.90 sq mi (85.22 km^{2})
  - Land: 32.21 sq mi (83.42 km^{2})
  - Water: 0.69 sq mi (1.80 km^{2})
- Highest elevation (Cranberry Mountain): 1,234 ft (376 m)
- Lowest elevation: 430 ft (130 m)

Population (2020)
  - Total: 11,541
  - Density: 369.75/sq mi (142.76/km^{2})
- Time zone: UTC-5 (EST)
  - Summer (DST): UTC-4 (EDT)
- ZIP Code: 12563
- Area code: 845
- FIPS code: 36–079–56748
- FIPS code: 36-56748
- GNIS feature ID: 0979345
- Wikimedia Commons: Patterson, New York
- Website: Town of Patterson, NY

Patterson is a town in Putnam County, New York, United States. The town is in the northeastern part of the county and Interstate 84 passes through its southwestern section. The population was 11,541 at the 2020 census. The town is named after farmer Matthew Paterson. The original name was spelled “Paterson,” but was changed to its current spelling in the mid-19th century, reportedly because mail delivery confusion with Paterson, New Jersey.

== History ==
The town was first settled around 1720 in The Oblong, which was a disputed area in southeastern Province of New York also claimed by the Connecticut Colony. The Oblong was a strip of land approximately 1.81 miles wide (2.91 km) between Dutchess County, New York, and Connecticut, ceded to New York in the 1731 Treaty of Dover. Between 1720 and 1776, a large number of mostly Connecticut families settled in the southern Oblong. They could not settle west of it because that land was privately owned by the Philipse family. It had been granted a patent for virtually all of the remainder of the area of the future Putnam County.

The first such settlers in the Oblong were the Hayt family, who built a house at The Elm in 1720. Another early settler was Jacob Haviland, who settled Haviland Hollow in 1731. The first village in Putnam County, the hamlet of Patterson, was originally called Frederickstown. The eastern part of the future Putnam County was called Southeast Precinct (not the same as the current town of Southeast).

The Philipses were Loyalists during the Revolution and left the area. The state confiscated their land, selling it off. In 1788, the former Philipse portion of the Oblong was chartered as the Town of Southeast; the remainder of the region was chartered as the Town of Fredericktown in Dutchess County, New York. In 1795, Fredericktown township was split into four parts: 1. the Town of Carmel, 2. a part which was combined with the northern half of Southeast and became the Town of Franklin, which was renamed the Town of Patterson in 1808, 3. a part which was combined with the southern half of Southeast and became the new, much larger town of Southeast, and 4. the remnant of the town, which was the Town of Frederick for a while. It was renamed as the Town of Kent in 1817.

== Notable people ==
- Henry Ludington - local resident, father of Sybil
- Sybil Ludington – local Revolutionary War Hero
- Elizabeth Montgomery – Actress spent her childhood summers in Patterson and resided there for many summer seasons until her death in 1995.
- Pete Seeger – musician
- Martha-Bryan Allen – Broadway actress, aunt of actress Elizabeth Montgomery; the actress owned a summer estate in Patterson, which was sold to the State of New York after her death and became part of Wonder Lake State Park.

== Geography ==
According to the United States Census Bureau, the town has a total area of 32.9 square miles (85 km^{2}), of which, 32.3 square miles (84 km^{2}) is land and 0.6 square miles (1.6 km^{2}) (1.95%) is water.

The northern town line is the border of Dutchess County, New York, and the eastern town boundary is the border of Connecticut.

== Demographics ==
Historical population
Census	Pop.	Note	%±
1820	1,578		—
1830	1,536		−2.7%
1840	1,349		−12.2%
1850	1,371		1.6%
1860	1,501		9.5%
1870	1,418		−5.5%
1880	1,579		11.4%
1890	1,402		−11.2%
1900	1,644		17.3%
1910	1,536		−6.6%
1920	1,231		−19.9%
1930	1,196		−2.8%
1940	1,328		11.0%
1950	2,075		56.3%
1960	2,853		37.5%
1970	4,124		44.5%
1980	7,247		75.7%
1990	8,679		19.8%
2000	11,306		30.3%
2010	12,023		6.3%
2020	11,541		−4.0%
U.S. Decennial Census

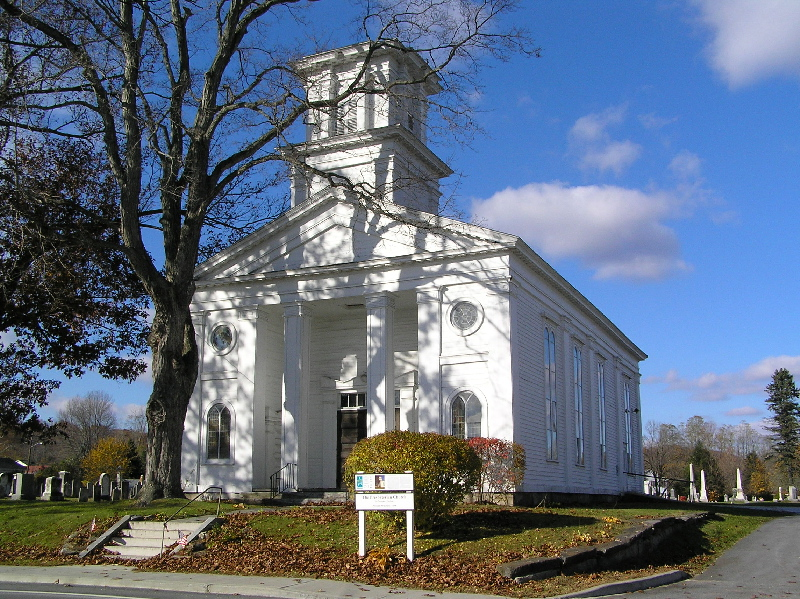
Patterson Presbyterian Church

As of the census of 2000, there were 11,306 people, 3,529 households, and 2,678 families residing in the town. The population density was 350.4 inhabitants per square mile (135.3/km^{2}). There were 3,746 housing units at an average density of 116.1 per square mile (44.8/km^{2}). The racial makeup of the town was 91.28% White, 3.56% African American, 0.16% Native American, 1.27% Asian, 0.03% Pacific Islander, 1.95% from other races, and 1.76% from two or more races. Hispanic or Latino of any race were 7.01% of the population.

There were 3,529 households, out of which 41.3% had children under the age of 18 living with them, 63.0% were married couples living together, 9.6% had a female householder with no husband present, and 24.1% were non-families. 18.6% of all households were made up of individuals, and 5.2% had someone living alone who was 65 years of age or older. The average household size was 2.86 and the average family size was 3.29.

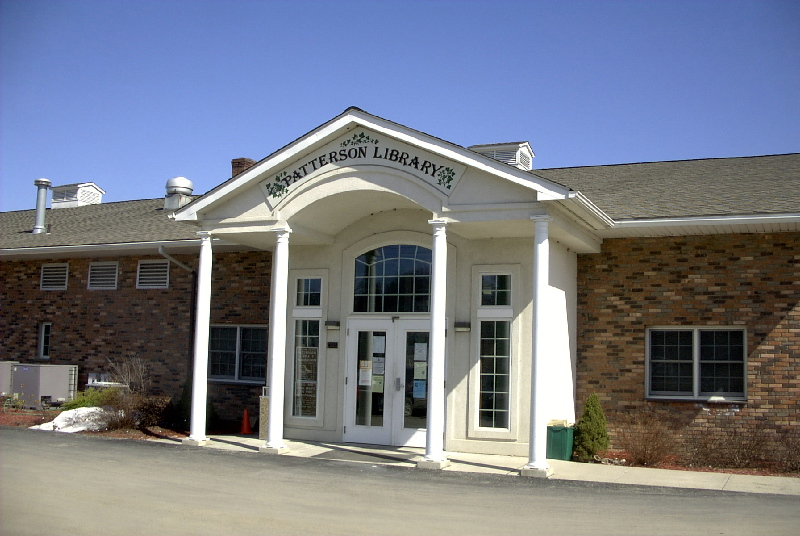
Patterson Library

In the town, the population was spread out, with 26.7% under the age of 18, 7.0% from 18 to 24, 36.8% from 25 to 44, 22.9% from 45 to 64, and 6.7% who were 65 years of age or older. The median age was 36 years. For every 100 females, there were 106.0 males. For every 100 females age 18 and over, there were 104.5 males.

The median income for a household in the town was $66,250, and the median income for a family was $75,746. Males had a median income of $50,161 versus $37,975 for females. The per capita income for the town was $26,103. About 3.7% of families and 4.9% of the population were below the poverty line, including 6.0% of those under age 18 and 11.2% of those age 65 or over.

== Transportation ==
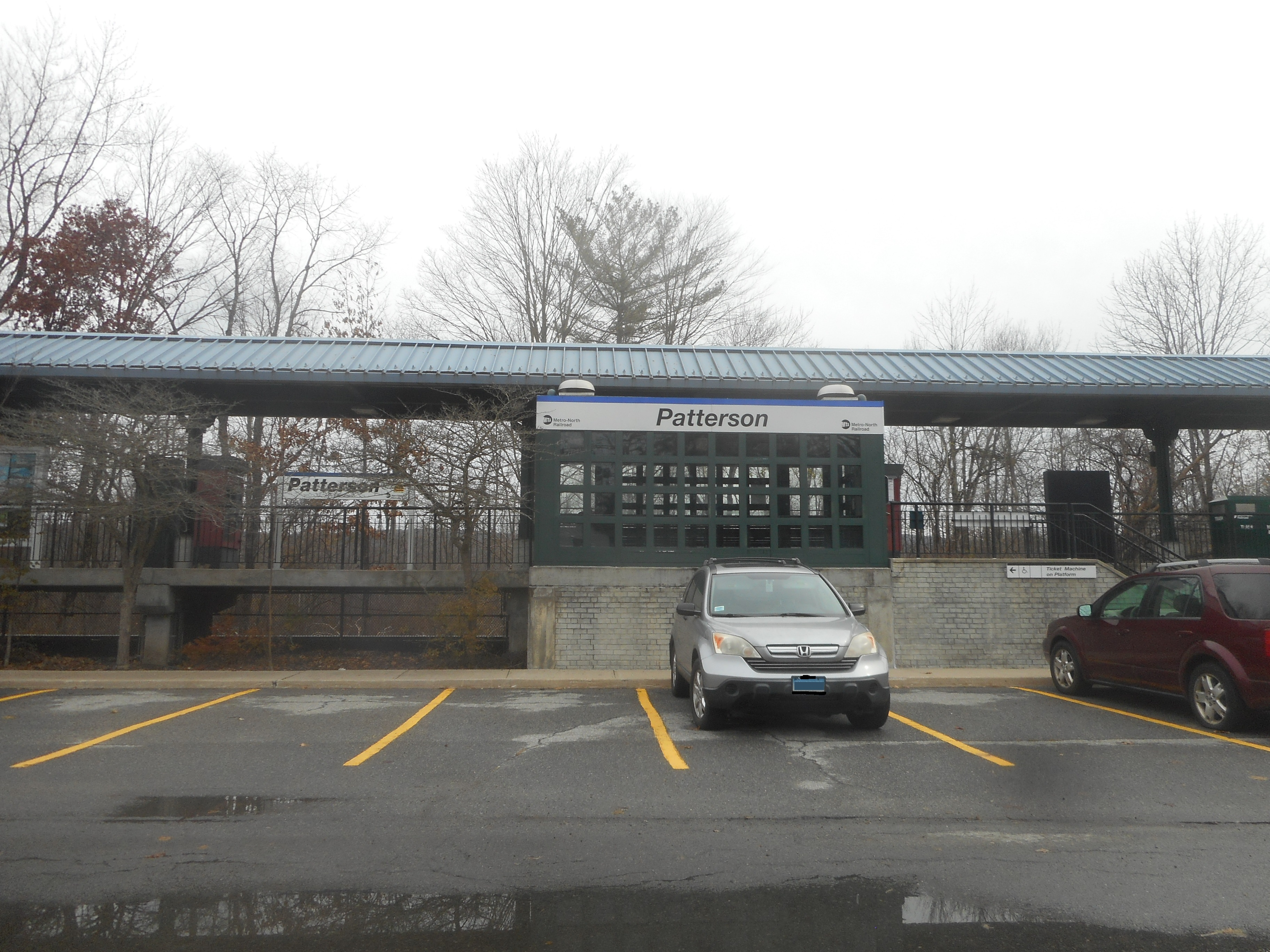
Patterson railroad station

Two main thoroughfares run through Patterson, NY State Route 22 & State Route 311. State Route 22 runs through every town on the East side of Putnam County, and runs directly through the Business District of Patterson. I-84 passes in the southwest and houses for Route 311. Metro-North Railroad has rail commuter rail service to New York City via the Harlem Line, with the Patterson train station in the town center.

== Government ==
Patterson is governed by a town board. The town hall is located on New York State Route 311 in Patterson. Law enforcement services for Patterson are provided by the New York State Police and the Putnam County Sheriff's Department.

== Communities and locations in Patterson ==
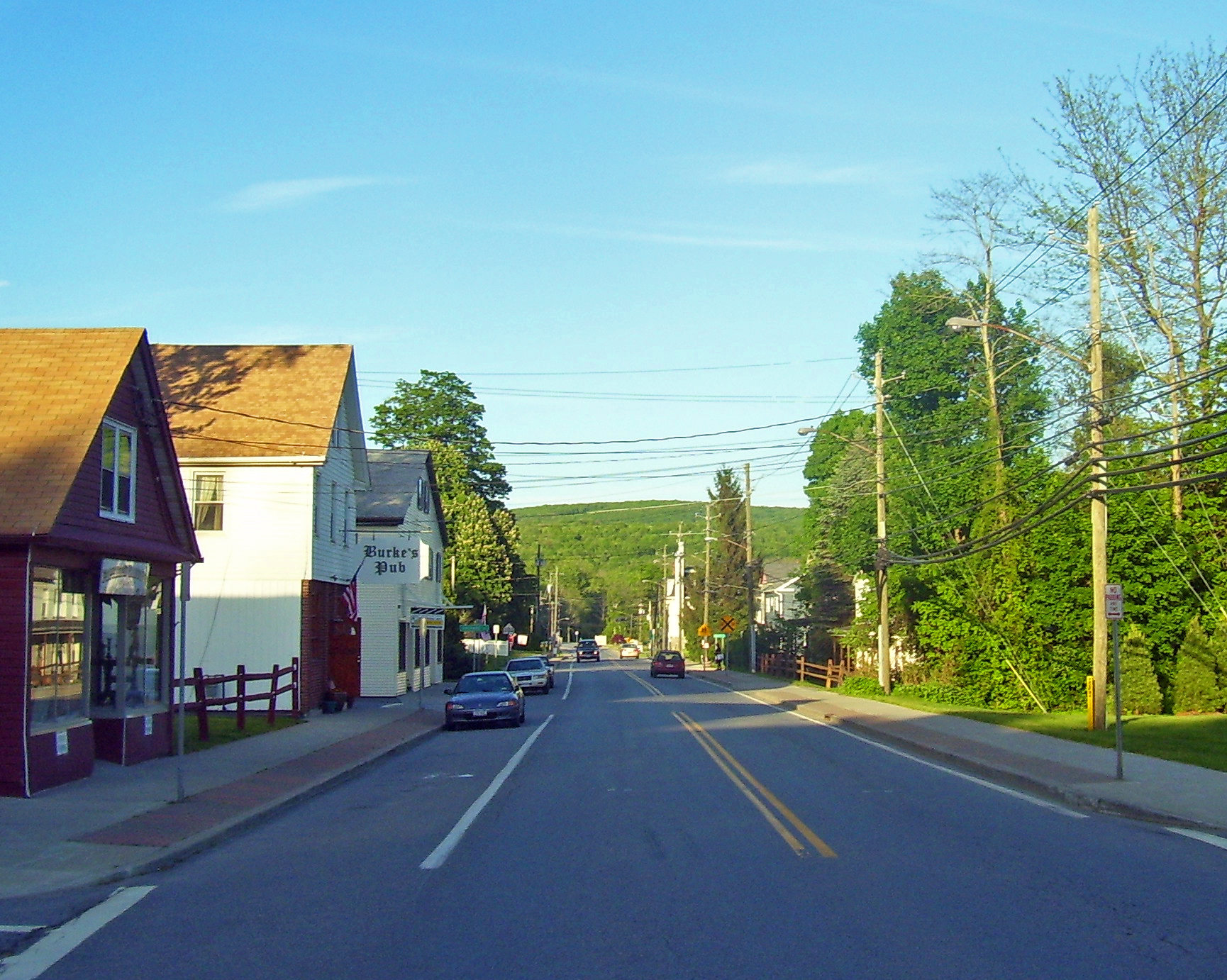
Looking east along NY 311 through Downtown

- Barnum Corners – A hamlet west of Putnam Lake.
- Camp Brady – A location in the western part of the town.
- Cascade Farm and Farm School Inc. – A small Community Supported Agricultural farm on Harmony Road off Route 292 in Patterson.
- Fields Corners – A hamlet in the southwestern part of the town.
- Haines Corners – A hamlet southwest of Haviland Hollow.
- Haviland Hollow – A hamlet northwest of Putnam Lake.
- Patterson – A hamlet in the northern section of the town, and the town seat.
- Putnam Lake – A hamlet west of the lake named Putnam Lake, which is in the eastern part of the town, by the Connecticut border.
- Steinbeck Corners – A hamlet in the southern part of the town.
- Thunder Ridge – A ski area located north of Putnam Lake.
- West Patterson – A hamlet west of Patterson hamlet.
- Haviland Hollow Farm – A polo and equestrian facility, built on historic Colonial River Farm located on East Branch Road in Patterson.
- Watchtower Educational Center, (Watchtower Bible School of Gilead) a religious school, office, and residence complex operated by Jehovah's Witnesses using the legal entity the Watch Tower Bible and Tract Society of Pennsylvania; the facility draws thousands of domestic and international visitors each year to its free guided tours and by-invitation educational programs.
- Wonder Lake State Park – An 1100+ acre state park on the western side of the town, off Interstate 84.
