= Pine Plains =

Pine Plains may refer to:

- Pine Plains (CDP), New York
- Pine Plains (town), New York
- Another term for Pine barrens
