= Wappinger Creek =

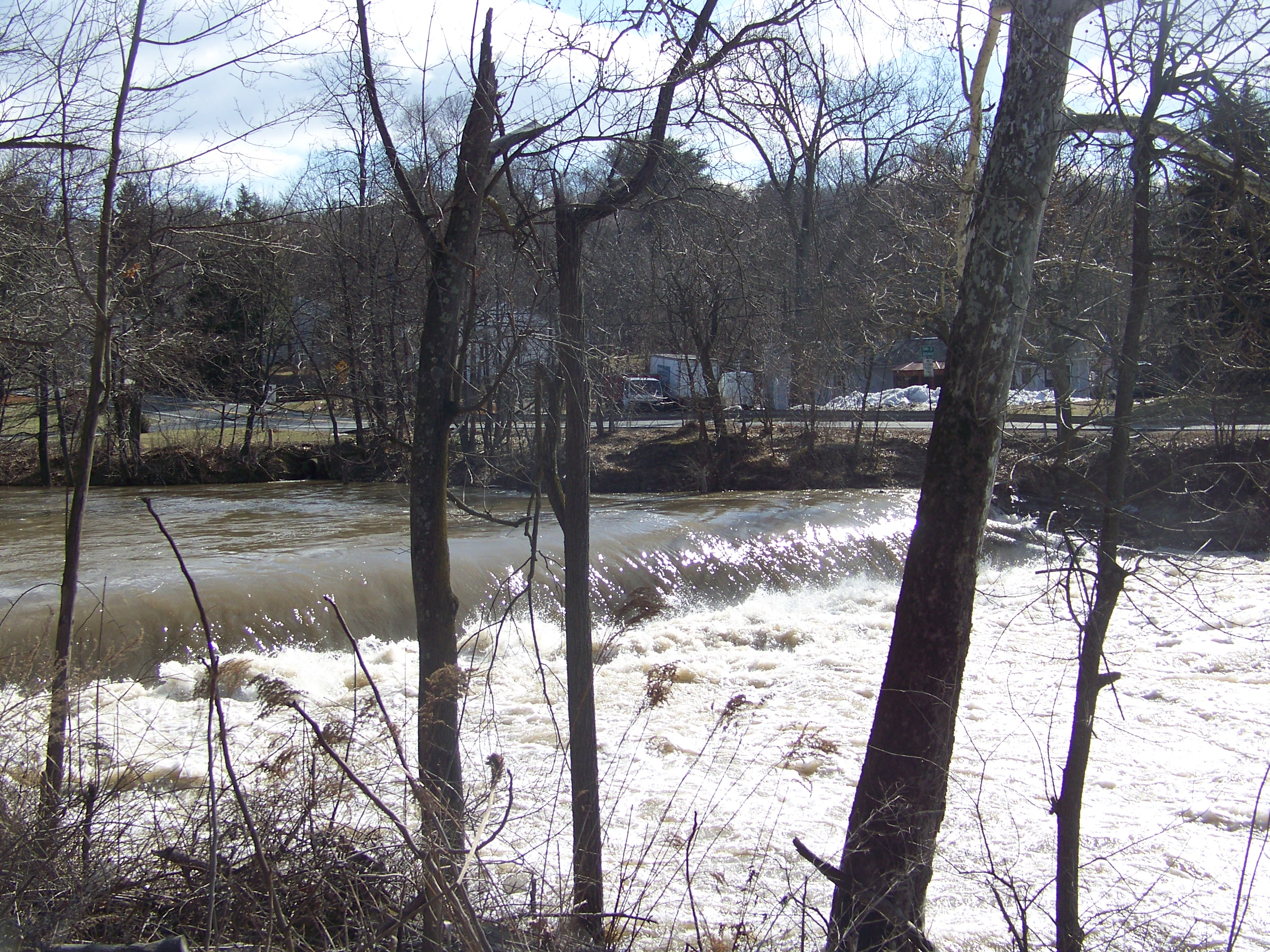
- Wappinger Creek at Red Oaks Mill at high flow

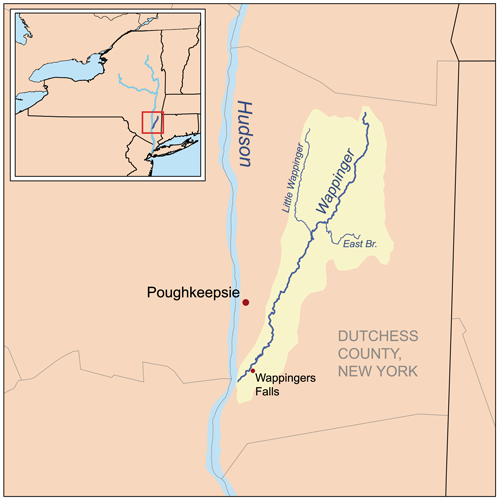
- Wappinger Creek Watershed
- Etymology: Native American Indians known as the "Wappinger"
- Native name: Ma-we-na-wasigh (Munsee)

Location
- Country: United States
- State: New York
- Region: Hudson Valley
- County: Dutchess
- Towns: Pine Plains, Stanford, Washington, Pleasant Valley, Poughkeepsie, LaGrange, Wappinger

Physical characteristics
- Source: Thompson Pond
  - location: Pine Plains
  - coordinates: 41.95845°N 73.67284°W
  - elevation: 450 ft (140 m)
- Mouth: Hudson River
  - location: New Hamburg
  - coordinates: 41.5823158°N 73.9479157°W
  - elevation: 0 ft (0 m)
- Length: 41.7 mi (67.1 km), North–south
- Basin size: 211 sq mi (550 km^{2})

Wappinger Creek is a 41.7-mile-long (67.1 km) creek which runs from Thompson Pond to the Hudson River at New Hamburg in Dutchess County, New York, United States. It is the longest creek in Dutchess County, with the largest watershed in the county.

== Overview ==
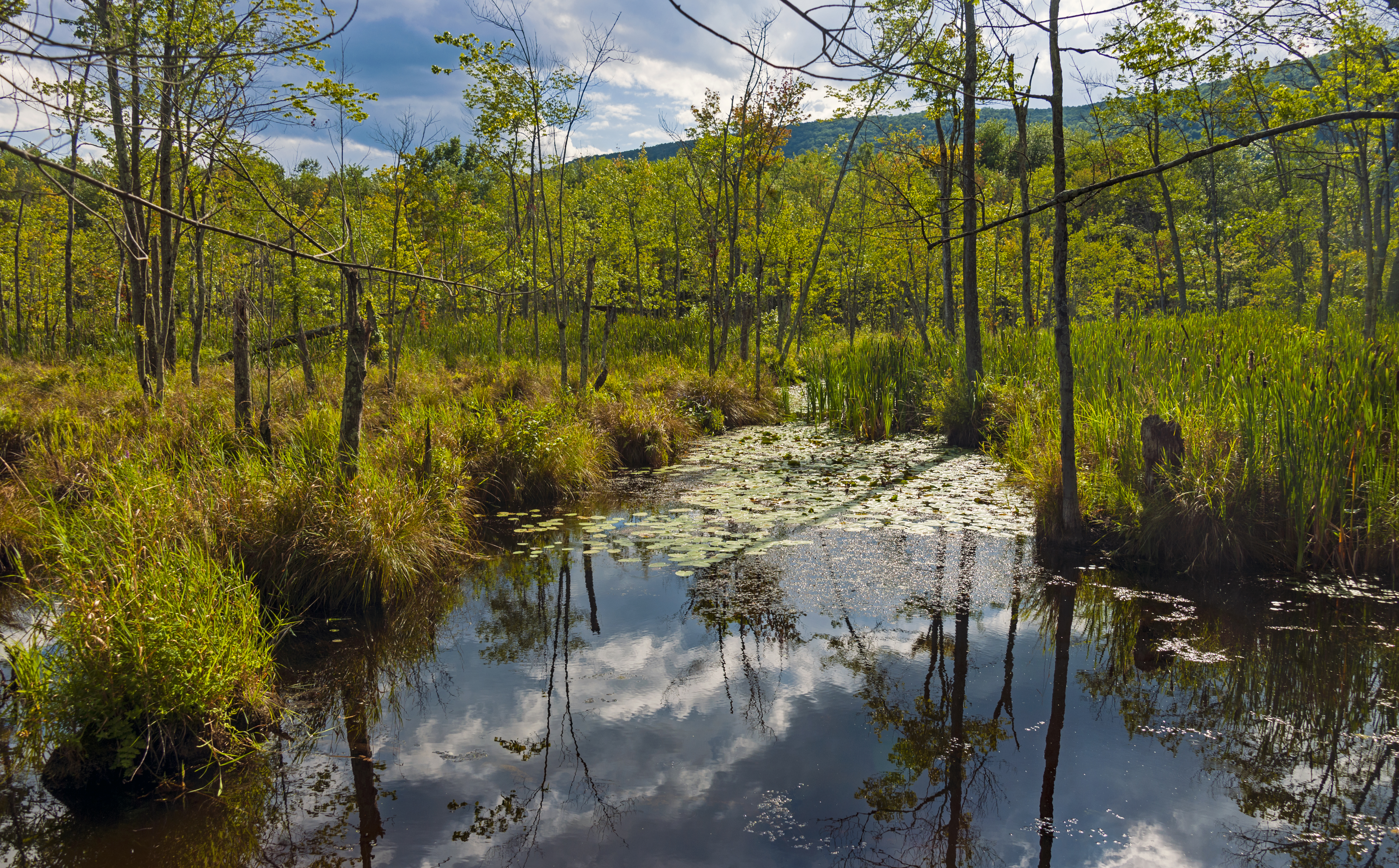
Source of Wappinger Creek at Thompson Pond in Pine Plains

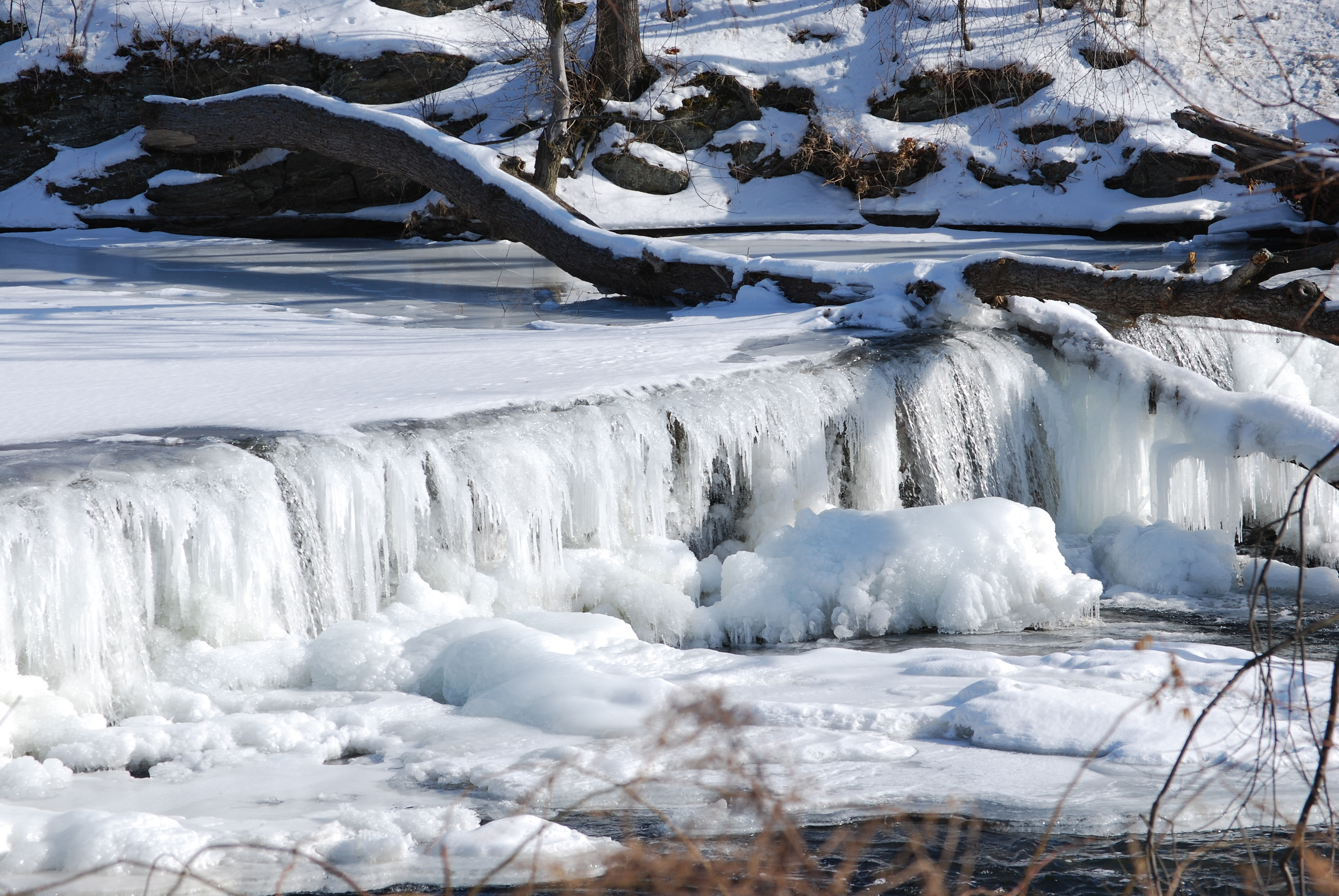
A frozen waterfall along the creek

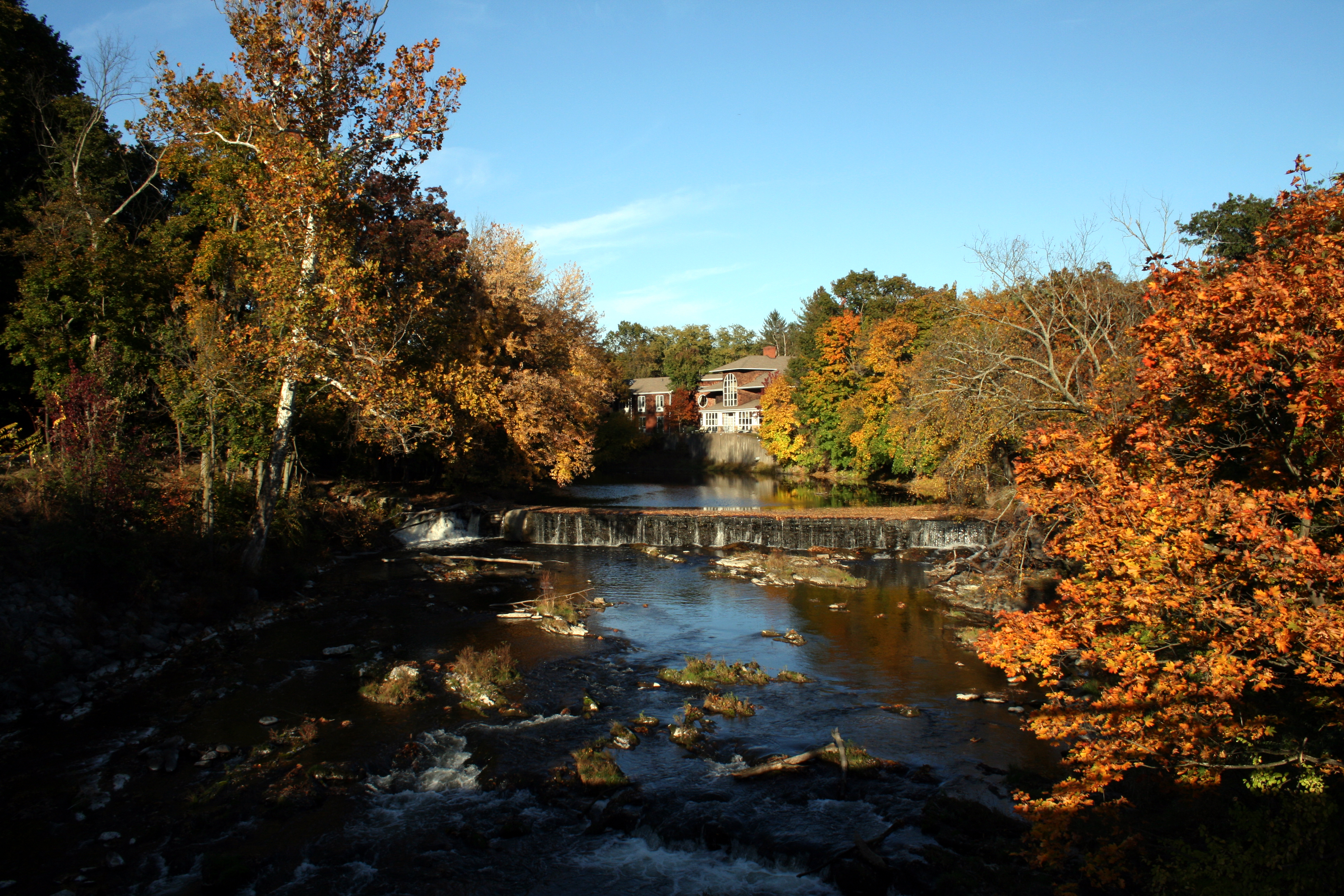
Looking north at Red Oaks Mills

The creek flows in a north–south direction on the eastern side of the Hudson River. The creek's source is Thompson Pond near Pine Plains, and it heads southwestward towards its mouth in the Hudson River near New Hamburg. Along the way, it goes through fluctuations in width and follows an erratic path. The initial .25 mi (0.40 km) of the creek runs through rocky, steep, wooded terrain. However, as it approaches the Hudson it enters the river's tidal range, and has sandbars, mudflats and marshes. The creek is also home to numerous species, and is an important spawning area for anadromous fish, which thrive in the creek between April and June. Largemouth bass, bluegill, pumpkinseed, red-breasted sunfish, and brown bullhead, however, are resident species. Also, the creek is annually stocked with various species of trout for the purpose of recreational fishing.

In Wappingers Falls, the creek forms Wappinger Lake, a man-made reservoir.

Some residents and maps such as the 1867 Dutchess County Atlas refer to the creek as the Wappingers, as does the New York State Department of Environmental Conservation, the National Weather Service, and the Hudson River Riverkeeper.

== Tributaries ==
Wappinger Creek has four distinct tributaries; the longest of which is Little Wappinger Creek which enters the creek from the east bank.

The tributaries are listed below from the source to the mouth, with Hunns Lake Creek being the northernmost and Little Wappinger Creek being the southernmost.

Name	Mouth coordinates	Source coordinates	Remarks
Hunns Lake Creek	41.8748°N 73.7029°W	41.9139°N 73.6442°W	Named after its source, Hunns Lake
Willow Brook	42.7267°N 73.7072°W	41.7038°N 73.7072°W	Enters Wappinger Creek where County Route 17 crosses
East Branch Wappinger Creek	41.8139°N 73.7581°W	41.7942°N 73.6926°W	One of the two largest tributaries of Wappinger Creek
Little Wappinger Creek	41.7975°N 73.7890°W	41.9884°N 73.7712°W	Longest Tributary of Wappinger Creek

== See also ==
- List of rivers in New York
- Mary Flagler Cary Arboretum: Wappinger Creek Trail
