= Evergreen Cemetery (Pine Plains, New York) =

Cemetery in Dutchess County, New York, USA

Coordinates: 41°59′03″N 73°39′18″W

Evergreen Cemetery, also known as Pine Plains Cemetery due to its location in that town, is an active cemetery located near the northern border of Dutchess County, New York with Columbia County, New York.

== Notable burials ==
- Philip John Amelio (1977–2005), child soap opera actor
