= Bangall, New York =

- Hamlet
- Location within New York Location within the United States
- Coordinates: 41°52′32″N 73°41′28″W
- Country: United States
- State: New York
- County: Dutchess
- Elevation: 440 ft (130 m)
- Time zone: UTC-5 (Eastern (EST))
  - Summer (DST): UTC-4 (EDT)
- ZIP code: 12506
- Area code: 845
- GNIS feature ID: 942960

Bangall is a hamlet in Dutchess County, New York, United States. The community is 6.2 miles (10.0 km) north of Millbrook. Bangall has a post office with ZIP code 12506, which opened on August 8, 1851.

== History ==
Bangall lies in the Town of Stanford, which was created from the Town of Washington in 1793. According to local lore, the hamlet's name derives from a Yankee tinker passing through the settlement who was harassed by some youths who went so far as to strike the tinker's horse in the head, killing it. To this the tinker is supposed to have responded, "Well, this does bang all!" A phrase that circulated until it stuck.

Among the early settlers were the Sutherlands, who are recorded in 1815. Early mills were powered by water from the Hunns Lake Creek, a tributary of the Wappinger Creek.

The First Baptist Church was established in 1755, the members having emigrated from Massachusetts. Elder Comer Bullock rode a circuit that included Rhinebeck, Kinderhook, Hudson, Oswego, and a number of other places. In 1867, surveyors for the Dutchess and Columbia Railroad discovered that the line would go through the church. The railroad then made a donation sufficient to allow the congregation to build a new church about half a mile south of the original. The Second Baptist Church was founded in 1860.

The Methodist Episcopal Church, erected in 1843, was established largely through the generosity of Leonard Winans, who donated the lumber, much of it hauled from Poughkeepsie. He also provided free board to the carpenters. Until about 1860 it was a joint pastorate with the church in Pine Plains, when it became a shared pastorate with the church in Milan.

The postmaster during President Lincoln's first term was John Bullis. The hamlet of Bangall developed as a railroad stop on the Dutchess and Columbia Railroad, which ran from Dutchess Junction to the Connecticut state line. Thus, the hamlet was a source of goods and supplies for the farmers in the surrounding area. In 1876, the Dutchess and Columbia became the Newburgh, Dutchess and Connecticut, locally known as the "Never Did and Couldn't".

In 1882, Bangall had a population of 154. The village had one hotel. Lawyer Daniel W. Guernsey served with the Washington Grays. Edward Ham, who served in the 5th New York Heavy Artillery, ran a harness shop. Colby, Condon, and Marvin ran the blacksmith shop.
