= Bangall =

Bangall may refer to:

- Bangall, Queensland, a locality in the Barcaldine Region in Australia
- Bangall, New York, a hamlet in the United States of America
