= New Ohio Theatre =

Off-off-Broadway theater in Manhattan, New York

Coordinates: 40.732572°N 74.008100°W

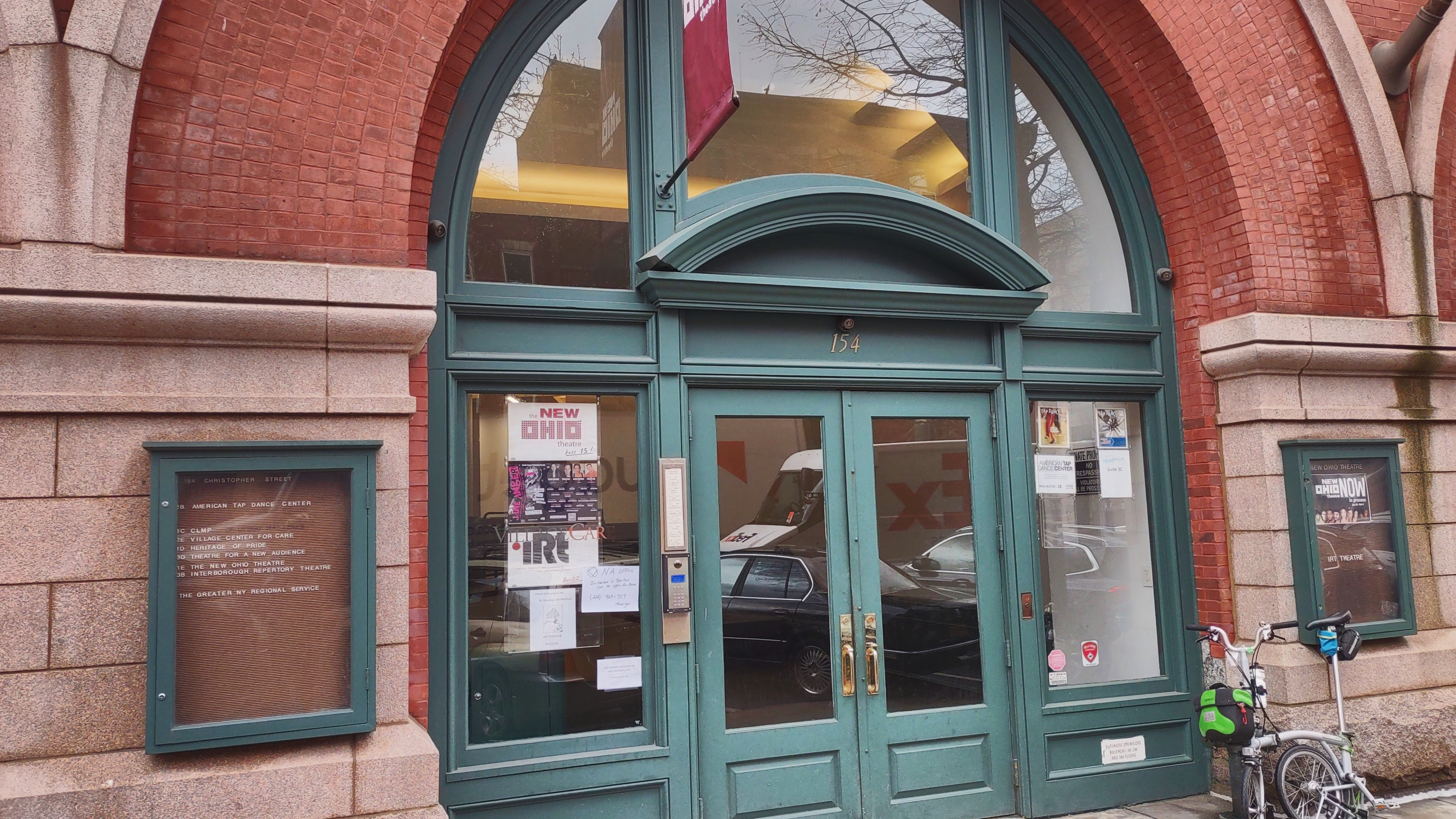
- The front door of the New Ohio Theater in 2022
- Founders: William Hahn and Charles Magistro
- Dissolved: 2023
- Type: Theatre group

The New Ohio Theatre was an off-off-Broadway theater in the West Village of Manhattan in New York City. Founded as the Ohio Theatre in SoHo, the theater moved to the former Federal Office Building (a.k.a. The Archive) at 154 Christopher Street in 2011. The New Ohio closed in 2023, and was reopened as Theatre 154.

== History ==
The Ohio Theatre at 66 Wooster Street in SoHo was founded by William Hahn and Charles Magistro, the building's owners. Director Robert Lyons took over operations in 1988, and in 1994 he founded Soho Think Tank as a not-for-profit producing entity which operated out of the space.

66 Wooster Street was sold to Zar Propertiy NY in December 2008, who told the theater they had until the end of January to leave. Lyons was able to secure a 14-month lease for the Ohio for a final season.

In 2011, the company moved to 154 Christopher Street, the Archive Building in the West Village, opening the New Ohio Theatre.

On February 13, 2023, the New Ohio announced that it would close at the end of its season on August 31, 2023. The space would remain a site for non-profit theater.

=== Theatre 154 ===
Following the Ohio's closure, the venue was renamed Theatre 154. Out of the Box Theatrics operated the space from September 2023 through December 2025, with Naked Angels, as theater company-in-residence.
