= The Pines (Pine Plains, New York) =

Historic house in New York, United States

- U.S. National Register of Historic Places
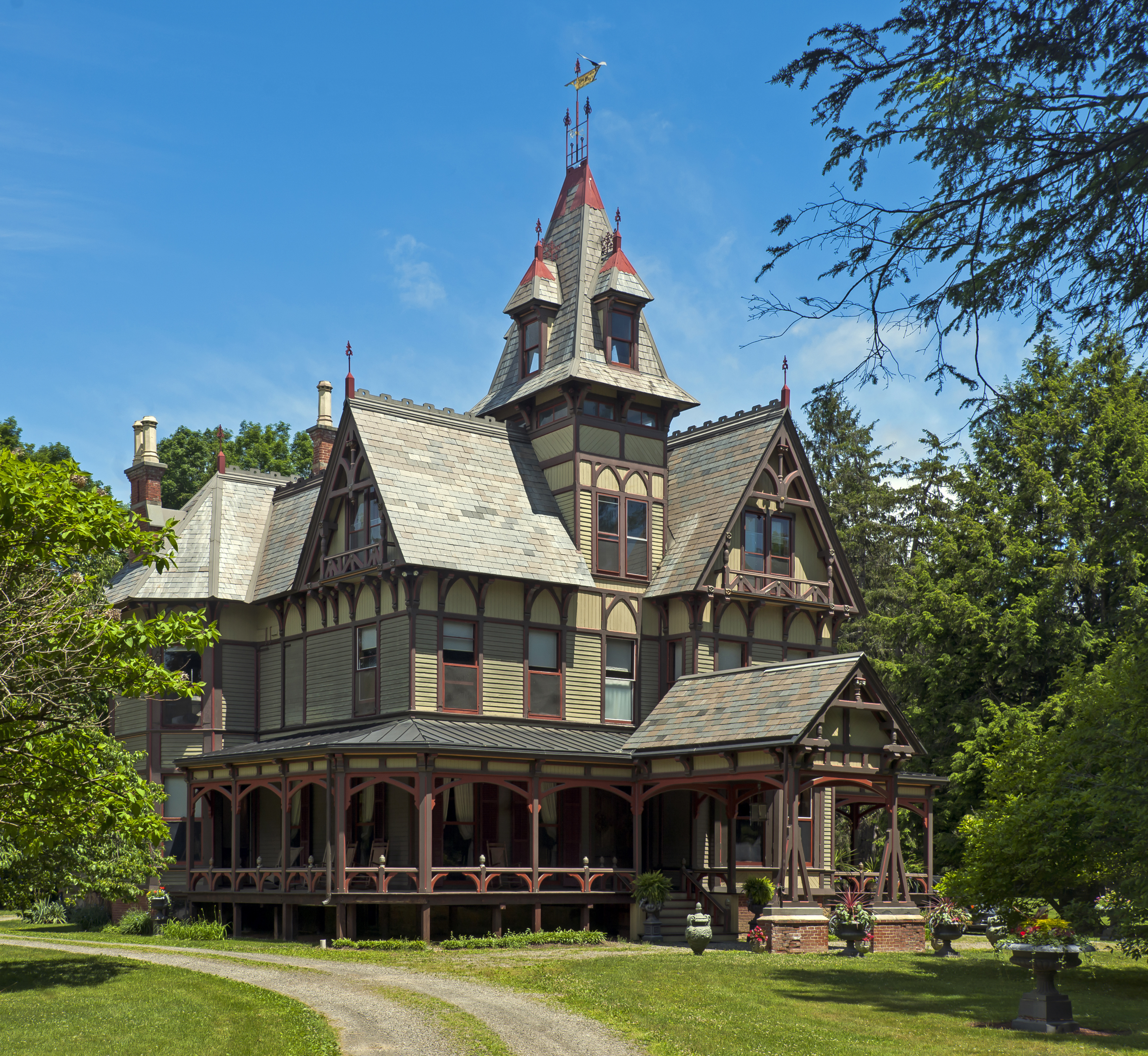
- East profile and south elevation, 2016

- Location within New York Location within the United States
- Location: Maple St., Pine Plains, New York
- Coordinates: 41°58′58″N 73°39′24″W
- Area: 4.8 acres (1.9 ha)
- Built: 1878
- Architectural style: Stick/Eastlake
- NRHP reference No.: 83001668
- Added to NRHP: September 26, 1983

The Pines is a historic home located at the hamlet of Pine Plains in the town of Pine Plains, Dutchess County, New York. It was built in 1878 and is a large 2-story frame residence with a 1 1/2-story service wing designed in the Stick-Eastlake style. It has an asymmetrical appearance with projecting bays, cross gables, and porches. It features a steeply pitched, common lap slate roof, four corbeled chimney stacks with terra cotta pots, and a tower with a steeply pitched pyramidal roof.

It was added to the National Register of Historic Places in 1983.

== See also ==
- National Register of Historic Places listings in Dutchess County, New York
