= Graham-Brush Log House =

Historic house in New York, United States

- U.S. National Register of Historic Places
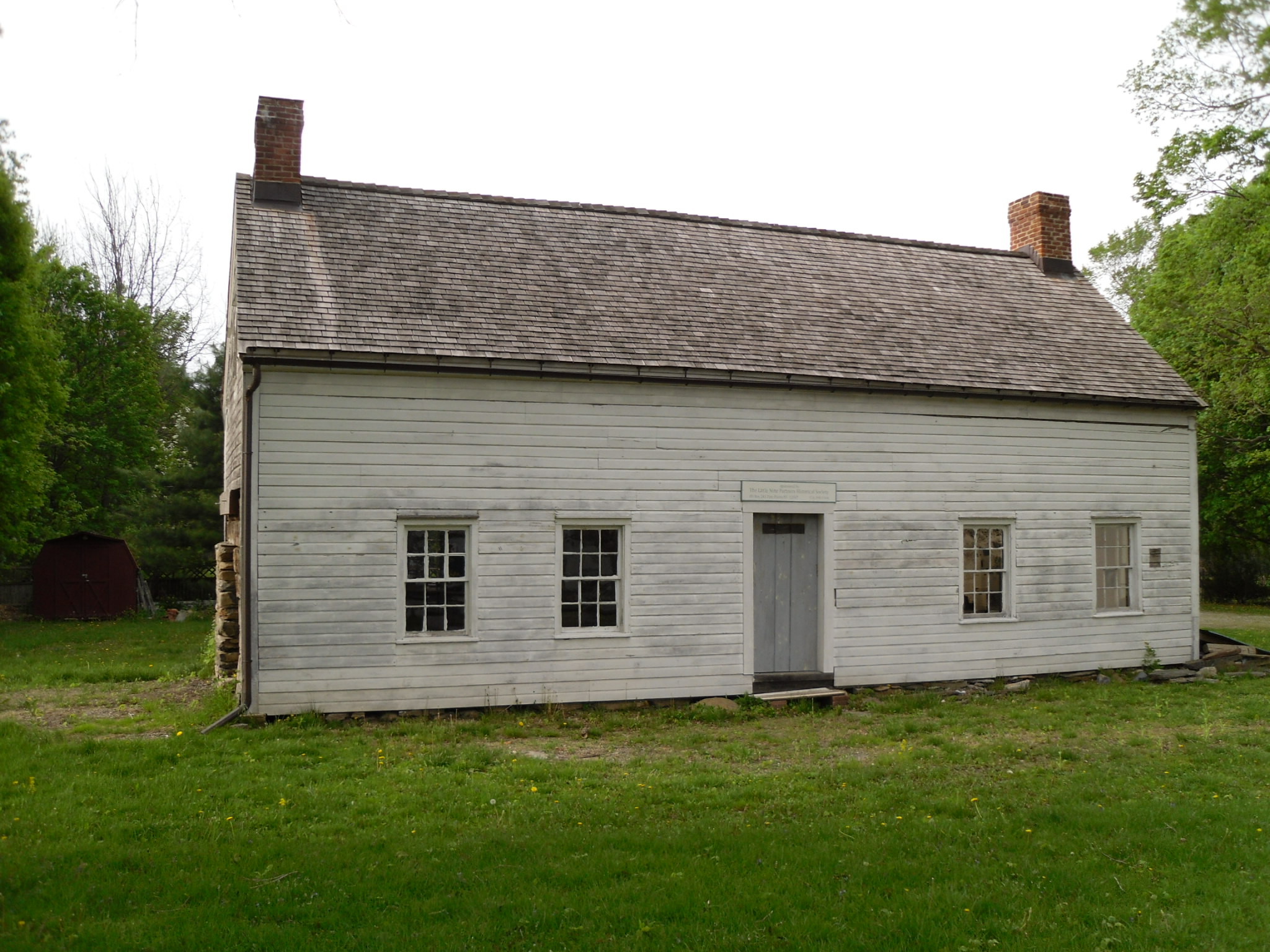
- Graham-Brush Log House, May 2010

- Location within New York Location within the United States
- Location: Church St., Town of Pine Plains, New York
- Coordinates: 41°58′48″N 73°39′20″W
- Area: less than one acre
- Built: ca. 1776
- Architectural style: Log House
- NRHP reference No.: 99000870
- Added to NRHP: July 22, 1999

Graham-Brush Log House is a historic home located in the Town of Pine Plains, Dutchess County, New York. It was built in about 1776 and is a two-room log structure with a wood frame lean-to on its rear elevation. It measures roughly 39 feet long and 18 feet wide. It is one and one half stories with a gable roof; the lean-to addition is one story. The Brush house was acquired in 1997-1998 by the local historical society, the Little Nine Partners Historical Society. In 1998 it was damaged by an arson fire.

Lewis Graham came from Westchester County where the British had burned his house. He came to Pine Plains because his father had been one of the Little Nine Partners in the local land patent. About 1776, he built a one-room log cabin without a cellar to which he soon added a center hall with stairs to the loft and another room with a fireplace, all of logs. The log addition was built over a cellar with an outside entrance. The simple lap joining of logs, without dovetails, relates its construction methods to the military garrisons being built at that time to house troops.

It was added to the National Register of Historic Places in 1999.

== Gallery ==
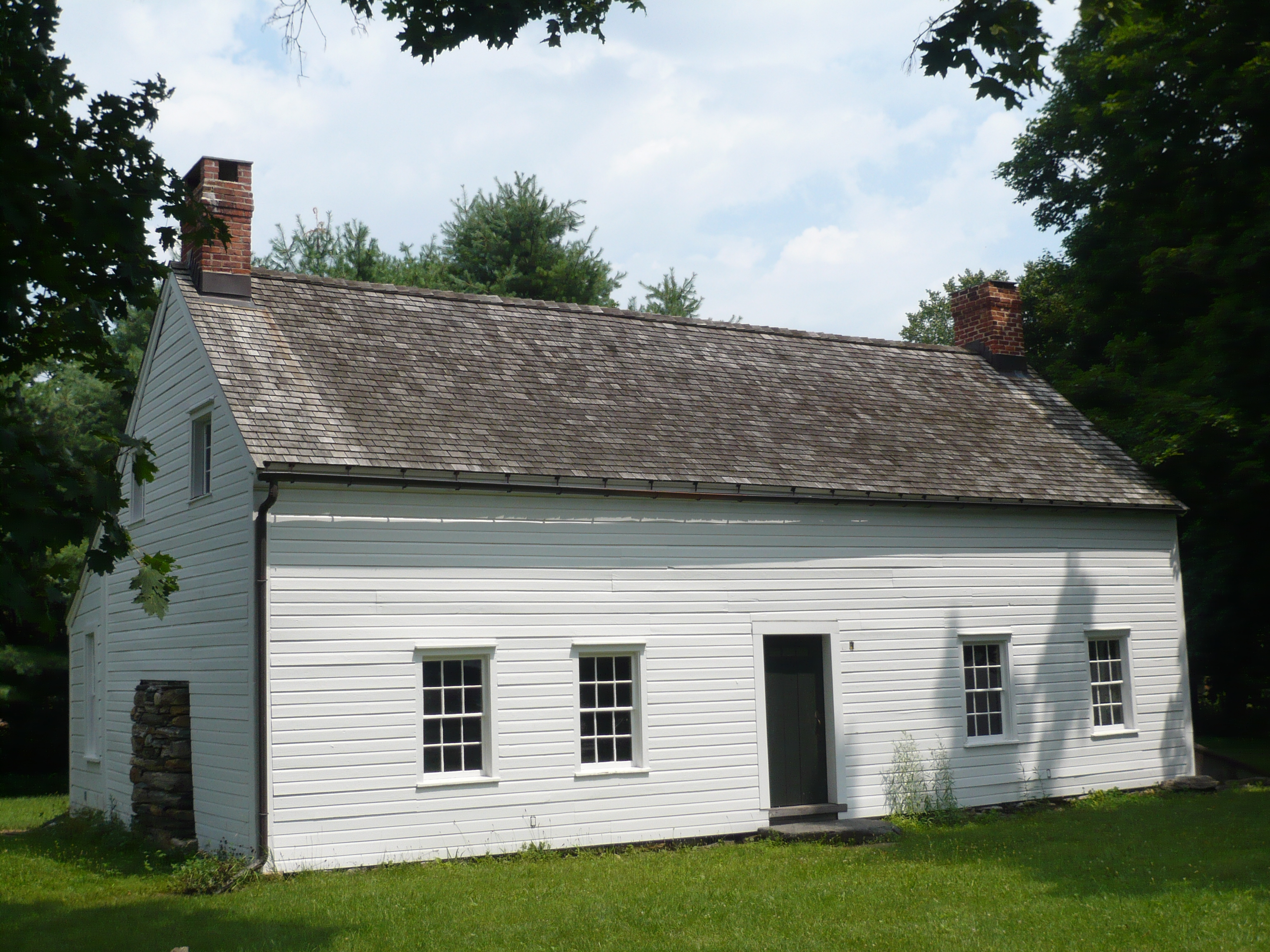
Front (July, 2015)

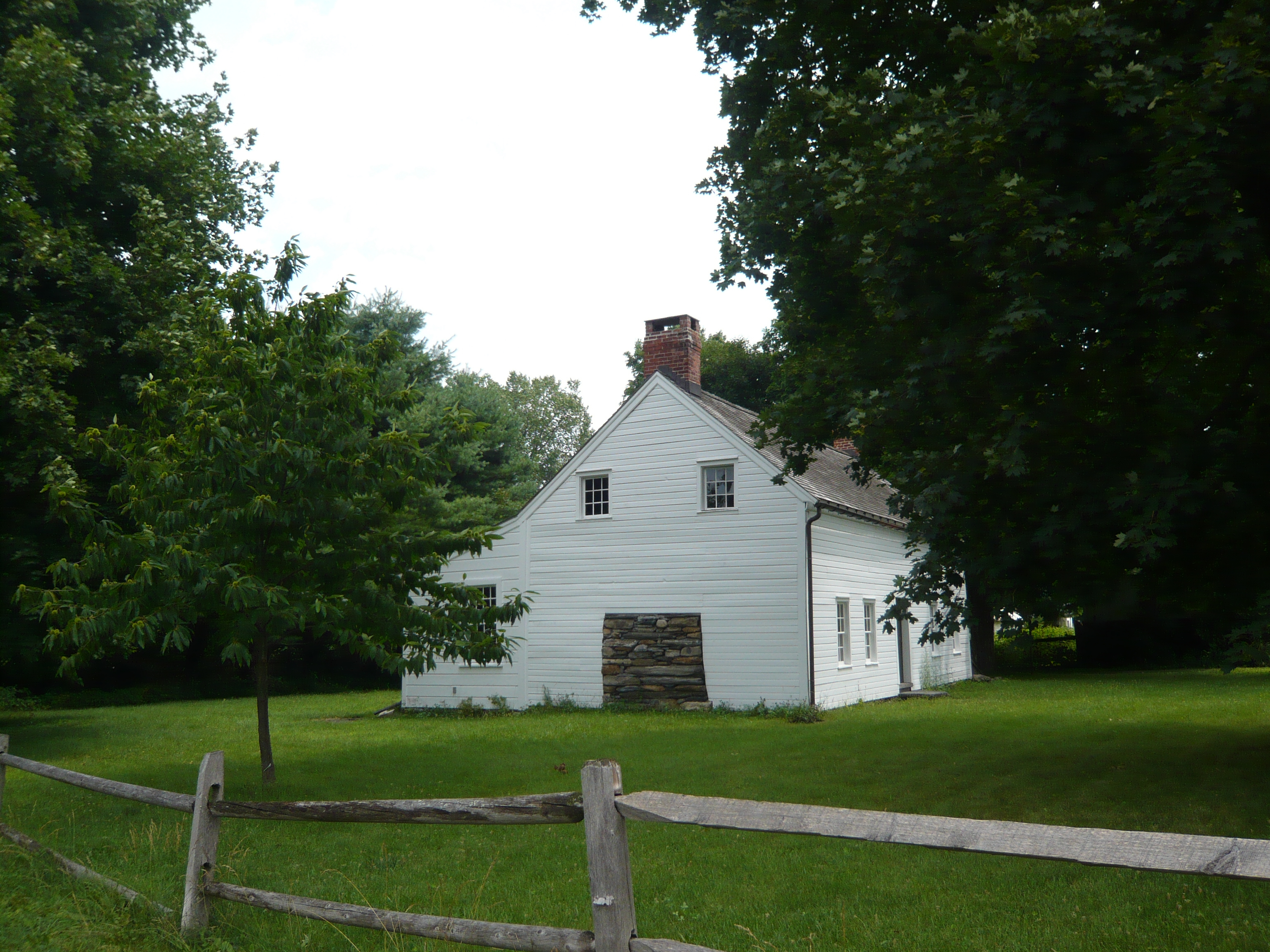
Side (July, 2015)

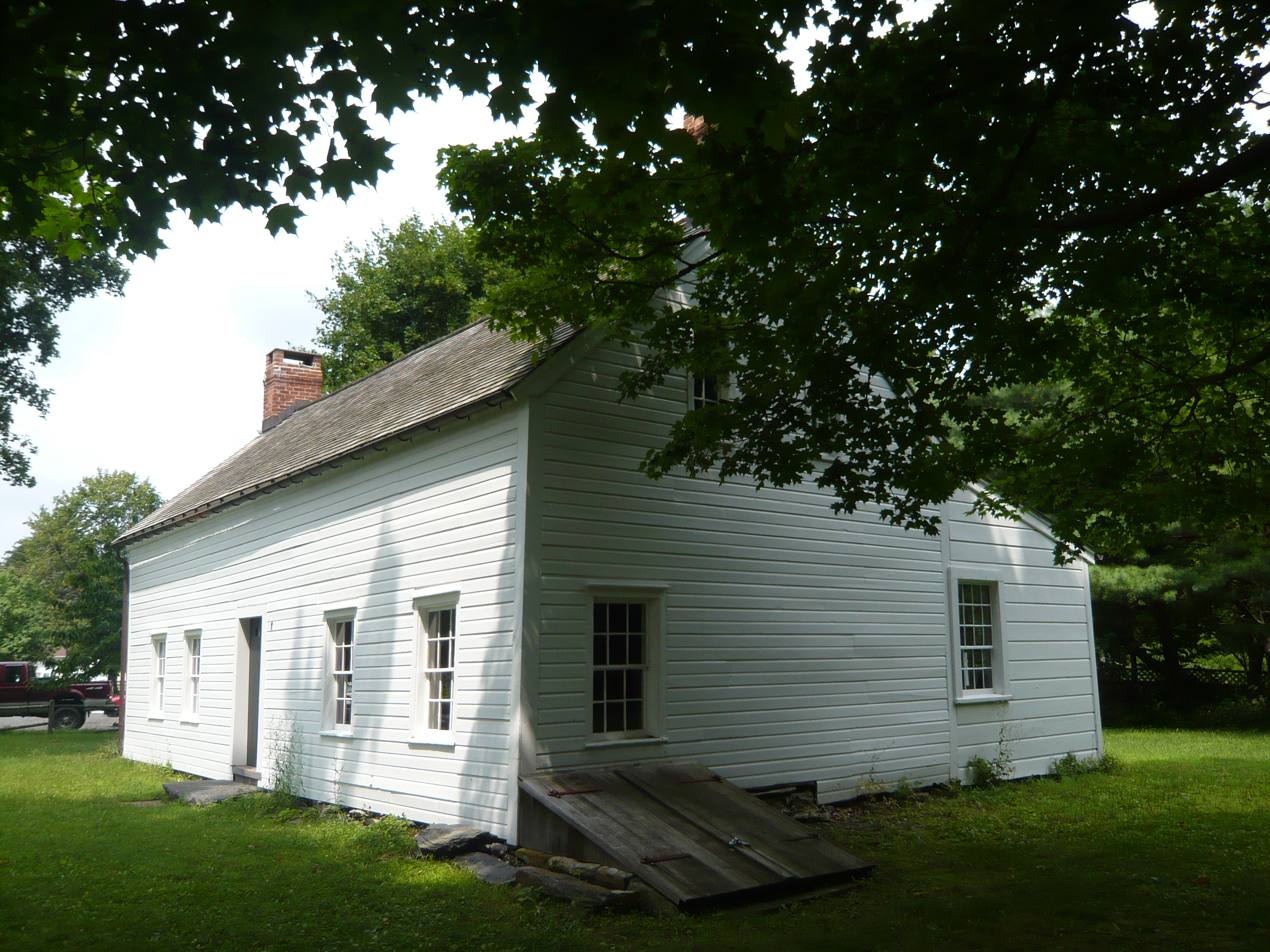
Side (July, 2015)
