= Thompson Pond =

Lake in New York, United States

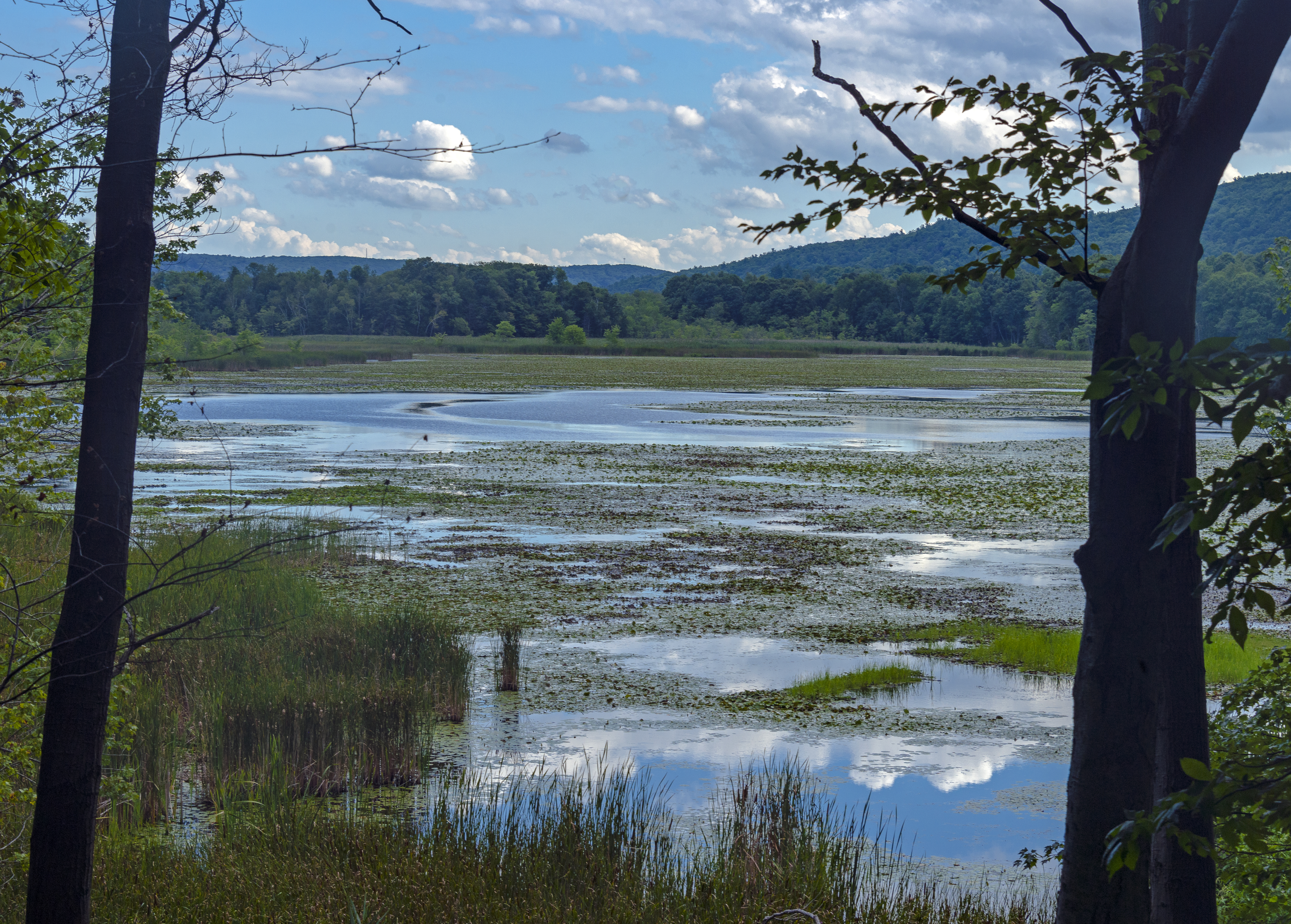
- Thompson Pond in summer

- Location within New York
- Location: Pine Plains, New York
- Coordinates: 41.961118°N 73.678737°W
- Type: kettle pond
- Primary outflows: Wappinger Creek
- Basin countries: United States
- Surface area: 75 acres (30 ha)

U.S. National Natural Landmark
- Designated: May 1973

Thompson Pond in Pine Plains, New York is a 75-acre (30 ha) 15,000-year-old glacial kettle pond at the foot of 1,403-foot (428 m) Stissing Mountain. It is the source of Wappinger Creek, a tributary of the Hudson River that drains much of Dutchess County.

The pond and mountain are part of a 507-acre (205 ha) nature preserve managed by The Nature Conservancy. The pond was designated a National Natural Landmark in May 1973 for its calcareous bog, unlike the more common acidic bogs in the Northeast.

== History ==
Thompson Pond and two other nearby bodies of water, Stissing Lake, and Twin Island Lake, were all originally connected, but separated over time.

The pond is supposedly named for Amos Thompson who settled in the area around 1746.

Thompson pond and Stissing Mountain were the inspiration for the New York State Environment displays in the Warburg Memorial Hall at the American Museum of Natural History built in 1951.

In 1958 the Executive Secretary of the Conservancy, Elting Arnold, convinced Briarcliff Farms to sell the land to the Conservancy for $20,000 which was raised from public donations.

== Visiting ==
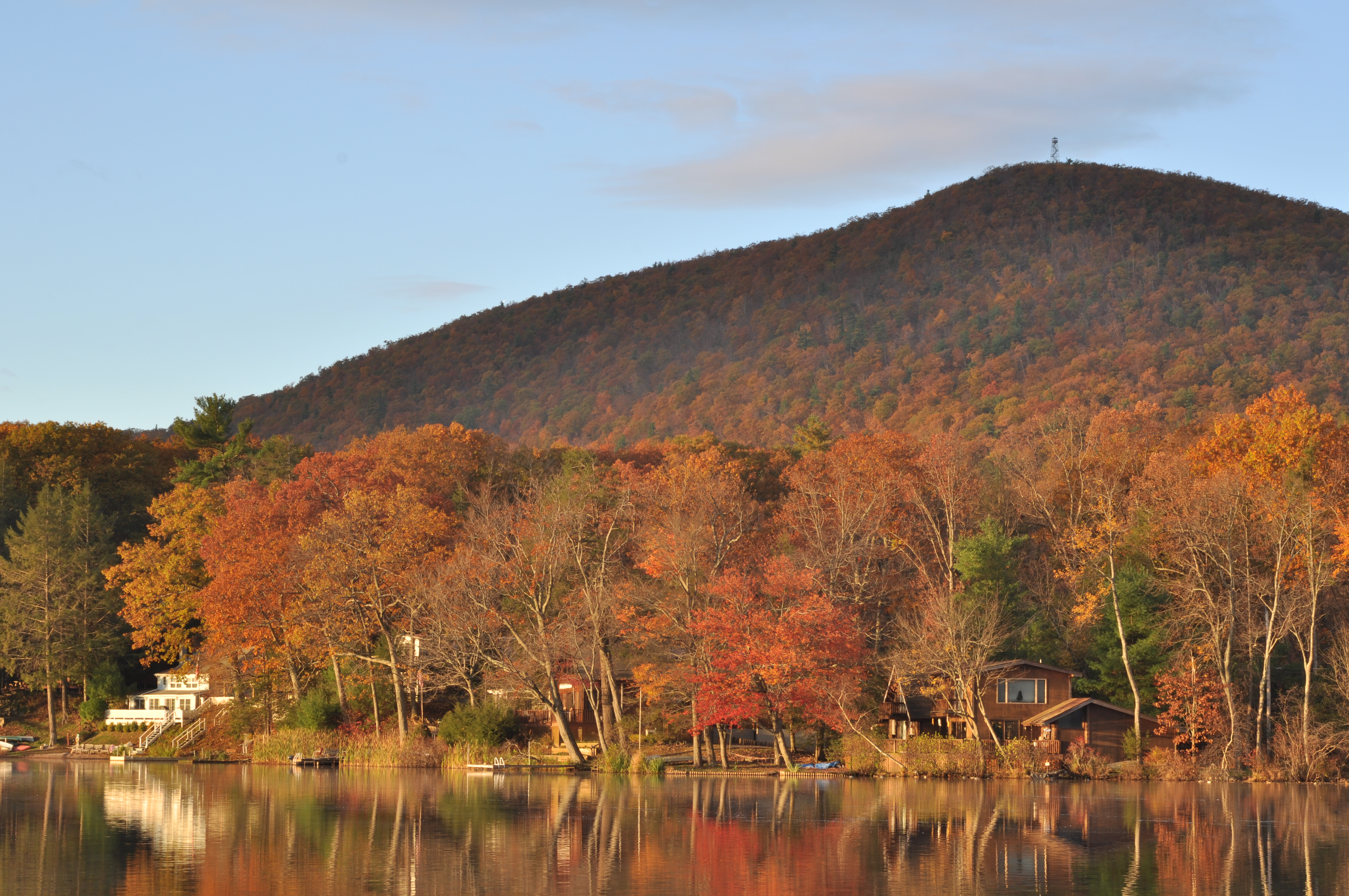
Stissing Mountain from across Stissing Pond; a firetower is visible at the summit

The preserve is open dawn to dusk, every day of the year for passive recreational and educational use. There are hiking trails around the pond and one that goes to the top of Stissing Mountain. There is a firetower at the summit that is open to the public.

== Plants and wildlife ==
There are more than 387 species of plants in the preserve including pipewort, round-leaved sundew, St. Johnswort and cattails. The surrounding woods include oak, sugar maple, ash, hemlock and hickory trees.

The preserve is part of the migratory flyway, over 162 bird species have been spotted here. There are also 27 types of mammals identified in the preserve.

== See also ==
- List of National Natural Landmarks in New York
