= Dr. Cornelius Nase Campbell House =

Historic house in New York, United States

- U.S. National Register of Historic Places
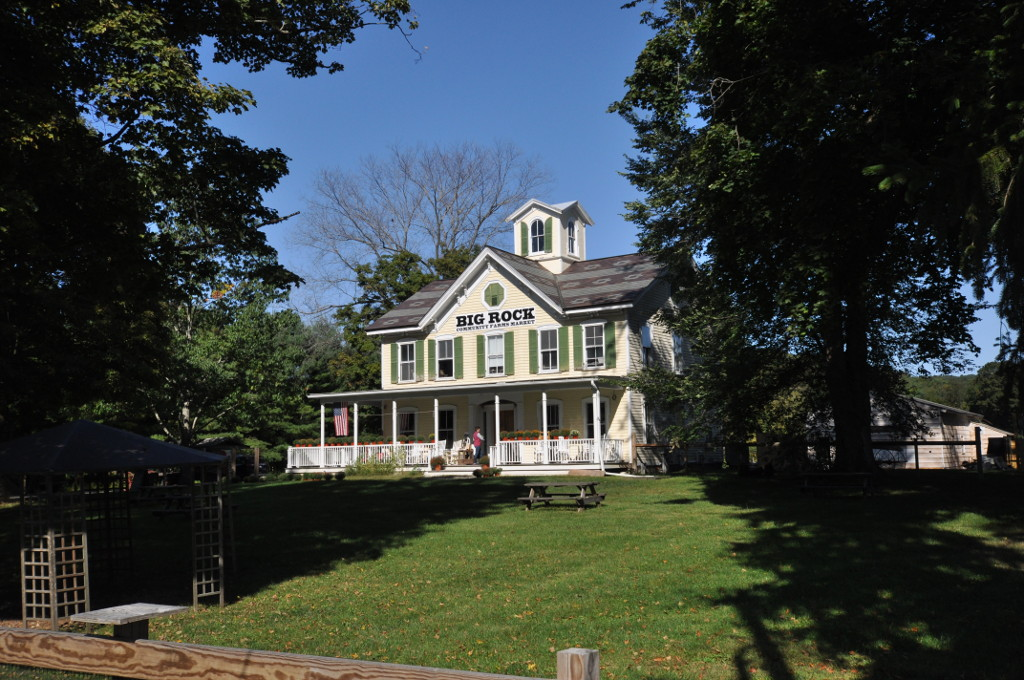

- Location within New York Location within the United States
- Location: 6031 NY 82, Stanfordville, New York
- Coordinates: 41°52′11″N 73°42′33″W
- Area: 1.5 acres (0.61 ha)
- Built: 1845
- Architectural style: Italianate
- NRHP reference No.: 07000333
- Added to NRHP: April 18, 2007

Dr. Cornelius Nase Campbell House is a historic home located at Stanfordville in Dutchess County, New York. It was built about 1845 and is a gable-ended, 2-story timber-frame dwelling with 1 1/2-story kitchen wing in a vernacular Italianate style. It has a cross-gable, bay windows, and a cupola. It features a full-length verandah on the front facade and patterned slate shingles. In 1872, it became the "President's House for the Christian Bible Institute. In 1909 it again became a private residence and a boarding house until abandoned in 1979.

It was added to the National Register of Historic Places in 2007.

== See also ==
- National Register of Historic Places listings in Dutchess County, New York
