= Shake 'n Bake =

Flavored bread crumb–style coating

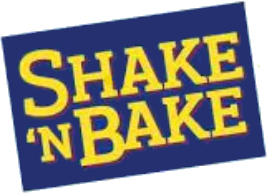
- Product type: Breadcrumbs
- Current owner: Kraft Heinz
- Produced by: Kraft Foods
- Country: U.S.
- Introduced: 1965; 61 years ago
- Previous owners: General Foods
- Website: www.kraftheinz.com/shake-n-bake

Shake 'n Bake is a seasoned breadcrumb coating originally marketed to mimic the flavor and texture of fried chicken. Introduced in 1965 by General Foods, it is currently made under the Kraft Heinz brand.

== Concept ==
Shake 'n Bake provides a baked alternative to foods fried in oil. The product is applied by placing raw meat or vegetable pieces in a bag containing the coating, closing the bag, and shaking it so the coating adheres to the pieces. They are then placed on a baking sheet and cooked in an oven. Shake 'n Bake has been marketed as a healthier and less-greasy alternative to frying, with slogans such as "Shake 'n Bake: It's better than frying" and "Why fry? Shake 'n Bake".

== Ingredients ==
The Original Pork flavor of Shake 'n Bake contains the following ingredients: enriched wheat flour (wheat flour, niacin, reduced iron, thiamin mononitrate (vitamin B_{1}), riboflavin (vitamin B_{2}), folic acid), salt, canola oil, sugar, contains less than 2% of paprika, dried onions, spices, caramel color, high fructose corn syrup, and yeast. The Barbecue Glaze flavor contains sugar, maltodextrin, salt, modified food starch, partially hydrogenated soybean and cottonseed oil, spice, brown sugar, mustard flour, dried onions, contains less than 2% of dried tomatoes, dried garlic, paprika, beet powder (color), citric acid, natural flavor, caramel color, vinegar, and sodium silicoaluminate as an anticaking agent.

== Advertisements ==
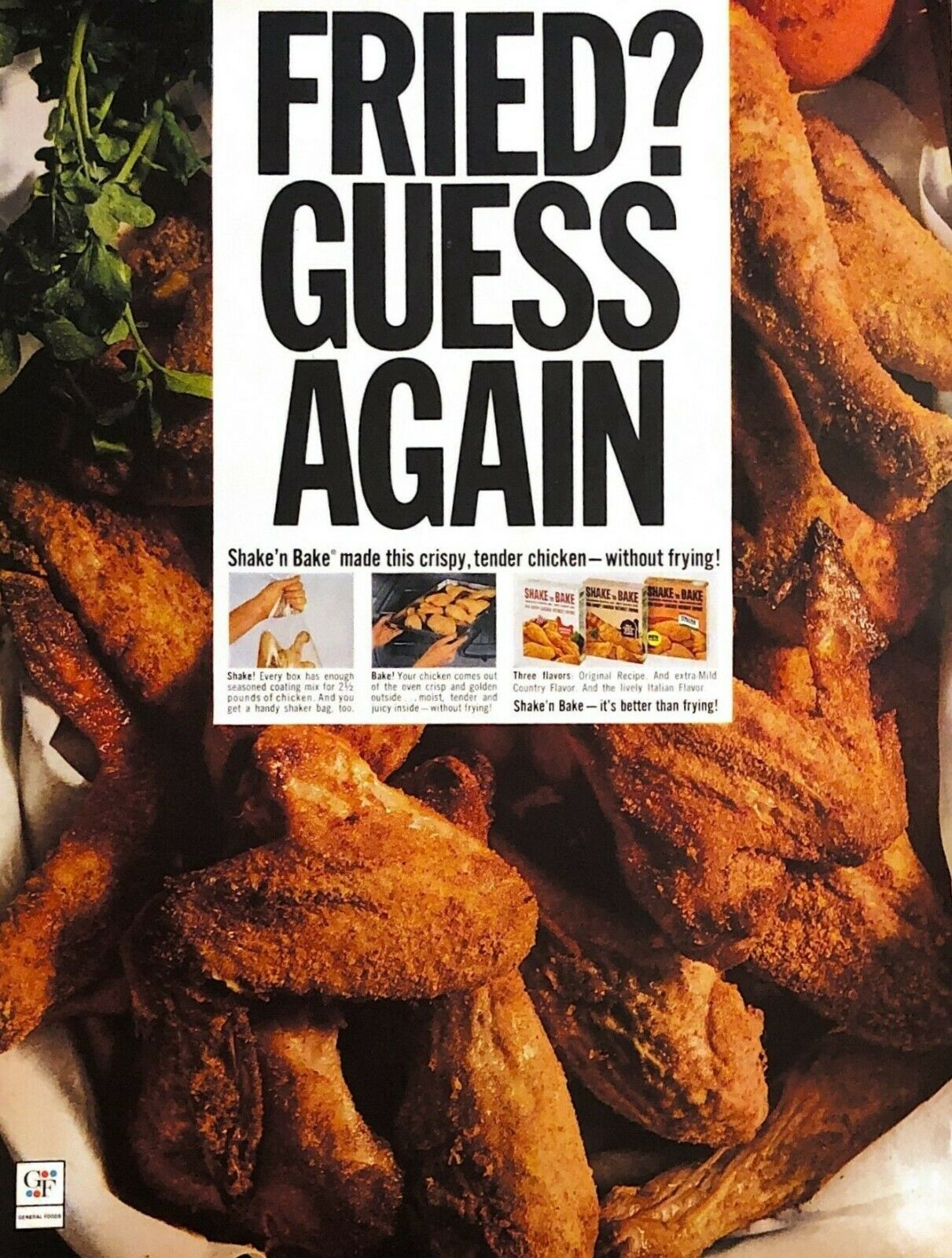
1968 advertisement by General Foods

Shake 'n Bake is particularly noted for its television commercials in the 1960s, 1970s, 1980s, and 1990s, starring such child actors as Melissa Miller, Carrie Jean Cochran, Carly Schroeder, Taylor Momsen, and Philip Amelio. In the ads, the aforementioned children help make Shake 'n Bake with their mothers, enthusiastically exclaiming, "And I helped!"

In the 1970s, Shake 'N Bake had a line of advertisements featuring a butcher named Pete The Butcher who constantly promotes Shake 'N Bake to his customers. Pete the Butcher was played by John Braden. In 1981 one of his ads included Ann B. Davis, who played Alice the housekeeper on The Brady Bunch. The ad copy includes the catchphrases, "Gotta be crispy, gotta be golden, gotta be juicy", and, "You just shake then bake, and that chicken's so crisp and juicy and golden it makes me look golden, if you know what I mean".

In 1990, two commercials were produced which show what pork chops and chicken look like after frying. They then show that pork chops and chicken are crispier, juicier, more plump, and more tender when used with Shake n' Bake than when fried. They conclude with, "Why fry? Shake n' Bake".

In 1998, a new commercial was tried with a different catchphrase: "Mama made Shake 'n Bake, and I helped".
