= Bangall Post Office =

- U.S. National Register of Historic Places
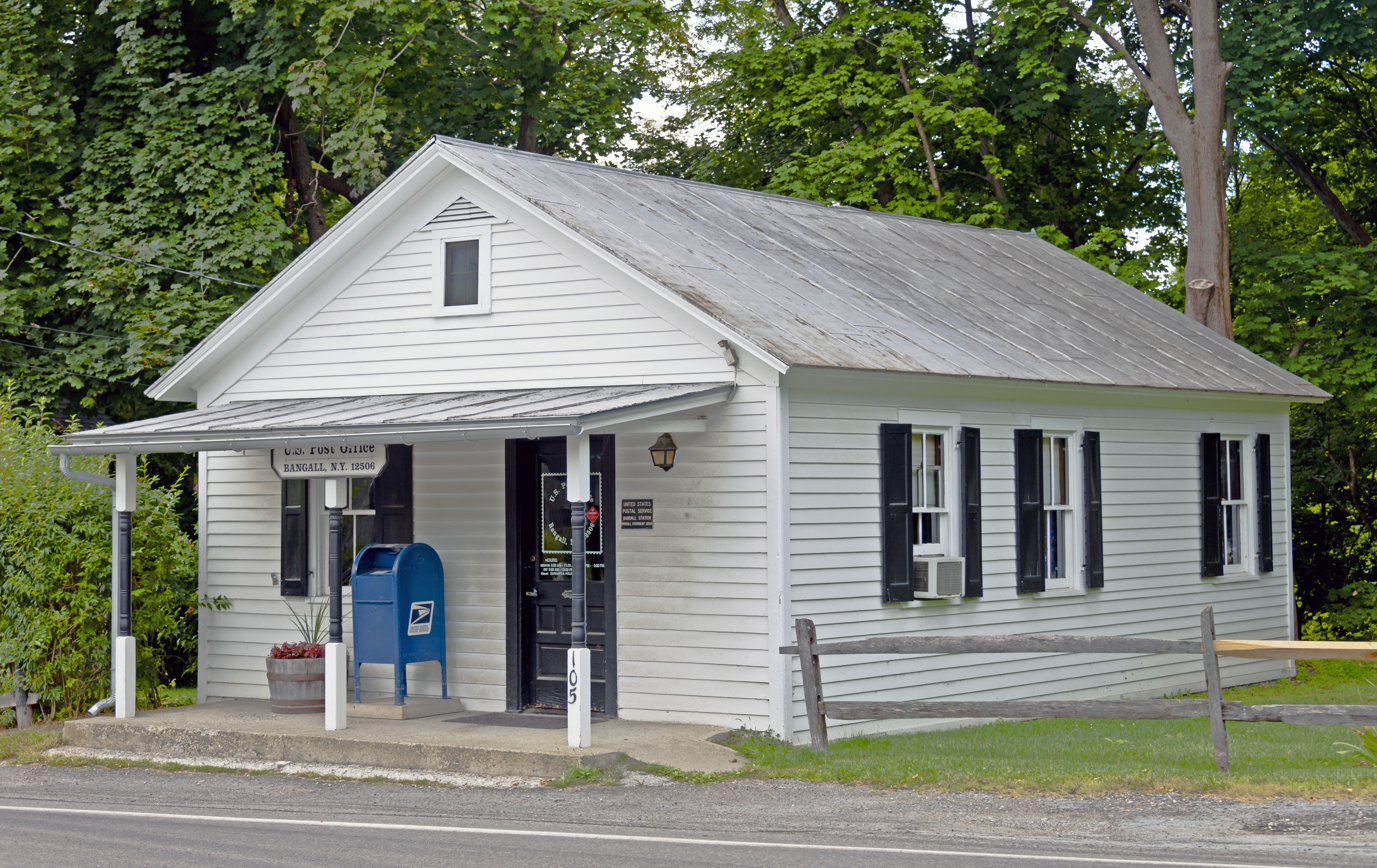
- Bangall Post Office, September 2014

- Location within New York Location within the United States
- Location: 105 Hunns Lake Rd., Bangall, New York
- Coordinates: 41°52′32″N 73°41′31″W
- Area: 0.02 acres (0.0081 ha)
- Built: 1915
- Architect: Knickerbocker, Harrie
- NRHP reference No.: 14000224
- Added to NRHP: May 19, 2014

Bangall Post Office is a historic post office building located at Bangall, Dutchess County, New York. It was built in 1915, and is a small one-story, rectangular frame building sheathed in clapboard. It measures approximately 30 by 20 feet (9.1 by 6.1 m), has a front gable roof with overhanging eaves, and sits on a stone foundation. The front facade features a one-story, almost full-width porch with shed roof. The building is owned by the Stanford Historical Society and leased by the United States Postal Service.

It was added to the National Register of Historic Places in 2014.

== See also ==
- National Register of Historic Places listings in Dutchess County, New York
