= George Morgan (New York politician) =

American politician

Member of the New York Senate from the 11th district
- In office 1870–1871
- Preceded by: Abiah W. Palmer
- Succeeded by: Abiah W. Palmer

George Morgan (July 16, 1816 – September 21, 1879) was an American politician from New York.

== Life ==
He was born in Chatham, Columbia County, New York, the son of William Morgan. The family moved in 1819 to Salisbury, Connecticut. He attended Wilbraham Academy, and then removed to Pine Plains, New York, where he became a clerk in a country store. In 1838, he married Almena Tripp (died 1860), and they had six children.

After a few years he went to New York City and opened his own business, but lost almost all his savings. About 1846, he removed to a farm in Columbia County. He was a Justice of the Peace from 1849 to 1852. He removed in 1857 to a farm in Dutchess County; and in 1861 to the county seat Poughkeepsie. He married Fanny L. Card (died 1877), and they had five children.

He was always a Democrat. He was Mayor of Poughkeepsie, New York from 1869 to 1871; and a member of the New York State Senate (11th D.) in 1870 and 1871.

He was buried at the Evergreen Cemetery in Pine Plains.

== See also ==
- List of mayors of Poughkeepsie, New York

== Sources ==
- The New York Civil List compiled by Franklin Benjamin Hough, Stephen C. Hutchins and Edgar Albert Werner (1870; pg. 444 and 559)
- Life Sketches of Executive Officers, and Members of the Legislature of the State of New York, Vol. III by H. H. Boone & Theodore P. Cook (1870; pg. 101ff)
- EX-SENATOR MORGAN'S STATEMENT in NYT on April 19, 1877

New York State Senate
Preceded by Abiah W. Palmer	New York State Senate; 11th District; 1870–1871	Succeeded by Abiah W. Palmer
