= Duanesburg High School =

Coordinates: 42.74873°N 74.187922°W

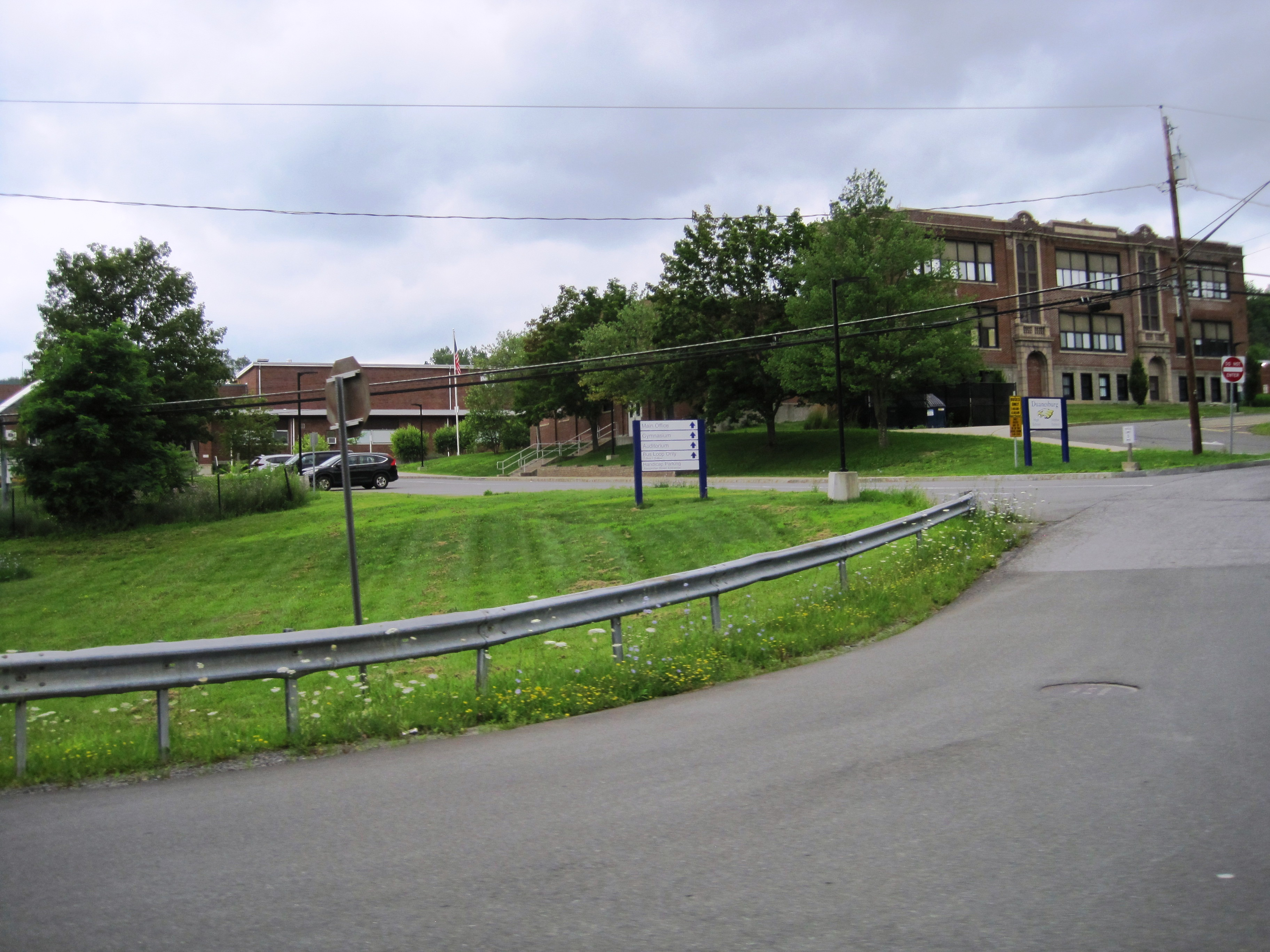
- 133 School Drive, Delanson, New York 12053

Information
- Type: Rural/Suburban public high school
- Motto: SOAR like an eagle; Safety Options Attitude Respect
- Established: 1958
- School district: Duanesburg Central Schools
- Principal: Jodi L. Marvin
- Staff: 34.11 (FTE)
- Grades: 9-12
- Enrollment: 303 (2023–2024)
- Student to teacher ratio: 8.88
- Colors: Purple and Gold
- Athletics: Western Athletic Conference
- Athletics conference: Section II
- Mascot: Eagle
- Website: Official site

Duanesburg High School is a high school located at 133 School Drive, Delanson, New York, in Schenectady County, in Upstate New York. It is affiliated with the Capital Region Board of Cooperative Educational Services (BOCES). Among those connected with the school were Philip Amelio, a former child actor, who once taught English and coached baseball.

== Academics ==
Duanesburg High gets above average ratings of 3 out of 5 from Great Schools. The New York Times noted that the school scores a 108 on academic performance, slightly above the 100 average. This was based on standardized test scores and the percentage of students with an 85% or higher average.

In 2005, a group of students from Duanesburg High's Participation in Government classes participated in a budgetary reform discussion organized by WAMC.

Students participated in the Poetry Out Loud poetry reading contest several times, most recently in 2010, sponsored by the state's arts education alliance.

The high school is also well known for its science labs and programs. Duanesburg High students were Schenectady County's winning school in NYSERDA's "Energy Smart Students Program". Students from this school were winners of the Capital Region Envirothon for several years.

== Athletics ==
Duanesburg high has teams in baseball, basketball, bowling, cheerleading, cross country, golf, soccer, softball, track and field, volleyball and wrestling. Their softball and wrestling teams are the best known.

Duanesburg has an award-winning softball team, garnering five straight regional "Section II" titles from 2007 through 2011.

Wrestlers from the Duanesburg team have won several championships. In late February 2011, Duanesburg senior wrestler Nick Gwiazdowski was named the Times Union "athlete of the week" for his two straight state Division II titles at the 215 pounds class. He had previously been a runner-up for that award. Gwiazdowski was the "dominant" wrestler at the New York state finals for the 2010-2011 academic year at the Times Union Arena. Having placed nationally, Gwiazdowski wrestled for Binghamton University in 2011 before transferring to North Carolina State University, where he won national championships in 2014 and 2015.

== Notable faculty ==
Philip Amelio, a retired child actor, once taught English and coached baseball at Duanesburg High School.

== Notable alumni ==
- Stephen J. Dubner, economist, radio commentator, and award-winning author of four books and numerous articles, including the best-seller, Freakonomics
- Nick Gwiazdowski, wrestler
- Marybeth Tinning (Class of 1960), serial killer
