= Pine Plains (town), New York =

Pine Plains, New York
- Town
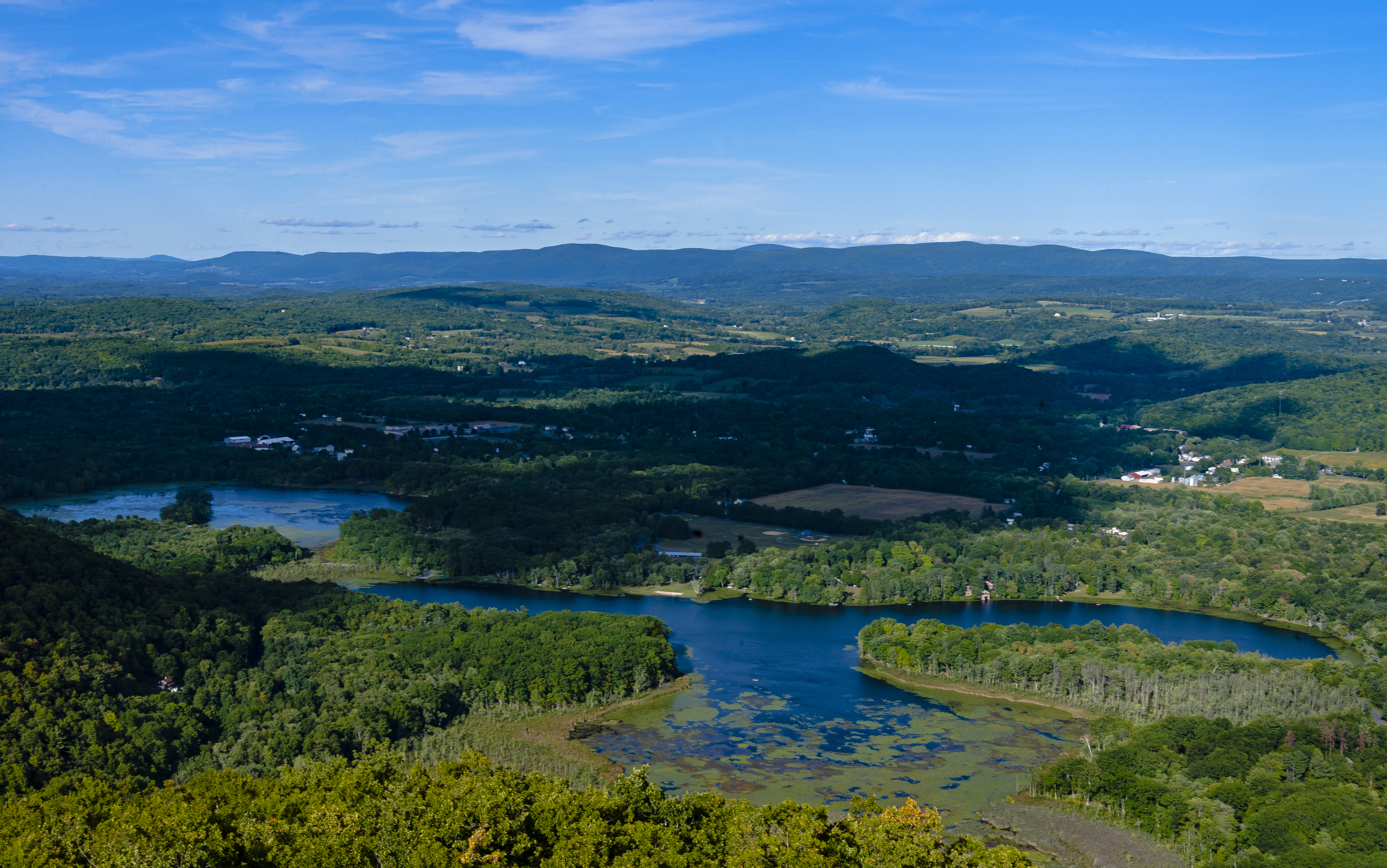
- Central Pine Plains from the Stissing Mountain fire tower

- Seal

- Location of Pine Plains, New York
- Coordinates: 41°58′N 73°39′W
- Country: United States
- State: New York
- County: Dutchess

Government
  - Type: Town Council
  - Town Supervisor: Brian Walsh (R)
  - Town Council: Murphy Birdsall (D) Trevor Roush (D) Jeanine Sisco (D) Kevin Walsh (D)

Area
  - Total: 31.17 sq mi (80.74 km^{2})
  - Land: 30.58 sq mi (79.21 km^{2})
  - Water: 0.59 sq mi (1.52 km^{2})
- Elevation: 474 ft (144 m)

Population (2020)
  - Total: 2,218
- Time zone: Eastern (EST)
- ZIP Codes: 12567 (Pine Plains); 12546 (Millerton); 12571 (Red Hook); 12581 (Stanfordville)
- FIPS code: 36-027-58156
- Website: pineplains-ny.gov

Pine Plains is a town in Dutchess County, New York, United States. The population was 2,218 at the 2020 census.

The name is derived from the geographic character of the region. The hamlet of Pine Plains is on the northern border of the county.

== History ==
The town was part of the Little Nine Partners Patent of 1706. The town was first settled around 1740 by Moravian missionaries to the native Mahican village of Shekomeko. The town of Pine Plains was formed from the town of North East in 1823.

In the 1880s the town served as the winter-home for P.T. Barnum's animals. This was due to the rural, non-urban nature of the town (fewer prying eyes), and proximity to many different railroad lines.

In 1907, Walter W. Law moved Briarcliff Farms from Briarcliff Manor, New York, to Pine Plains and sold the property in 1918. In 1916, New York banker Oakleigh Thorne and several business partners purchased large land parcels. They began breeding Angus cattle still in the name of Briarcliff Farm. The farm was broken up into several smaller farms in the late 1940s, and most lasted until the early 1980s, closing due to property taxes and poor economic conditions. Berkshire Stud purchased 550 acres (0.9 sq mi) there, starting in 1983.

== Geography ==
According to the United States Census Bureau, the town has a total area of 31.2 square miles (80.7 km^{2}), of which 30.6 square miles (79.2 km^{2}) is land, and 0.58 square miles (1.5 km^{2}), or 1.89%, is water. The northern town line is the border of Columbia County, with the towns of Gallatin and Ancram to the north. The town of North East borders the east, Stanford to the South and Milan to the west.

Three small lakes lie west of Pine Plain's hamlet: Stissing Lake which is excellent for swimming, Thompson Pond which is dedicated to conservation for wildlife, and Twin Island Lake, known locally as "Mud Pond". Stissing Mountain, the town's highest point at 1,403 feet (428 m), is immediately to the west. It is formed of Precambrian gneiss that remains after numerous glaciation cycles have scoured and reformed the surrounding terrain. The mountain itself is a permanent exhibit at the American Museum of Natural History, showcasing its unique formation and flora/fauna of the area.

== Land use ==
In 2009, the town enacted its first zoning ordinance after protracted review, discussion and community input. The Comprehensive Plan was updated in 2021.

=== Carvel Farm ===
Pine Plains is the location of a two-thousand-acre farm assembled by ice cream parlor chain entrepreneur Tom Carvel. It currently, as of October 2024, listed on the market by the Durst Organization, which was planning a housing community.

== Demographics ==
Historical population
| Census | Pop. | Note | %± |
|---|---|---|---|
| 1830 | 1,503 | | — |
| 1840 | 1,334 | | −11.2% |
| 1850 | 1,416 | | 6.1% |
| 1860 | 1,412 | | −0.3% |
| 1870 | 1,503 | | 6.4% |
| 1880 | 1,352 | | −10.0% |
| 1890 | 1,308 | | −3.3% |
| 1900 | 1,263 | | −3.4% |
| 1910 | 1,420 | | 12.4% |
| 1920 | 1,252 | | −11.8% |
| 1930 | 1,209 | | −3.4% |
| 1940 | 1,301 | | 7.6% |
| 1950 | 1,360 | | 4.5% |
| 1960 | 1,608 | | 18.2% |
| 1970 | 1,792 | | 11.4% |
| 1980 | 2,199 | | 22.7% |
| 1990 | 2,287 | | 4.0% |
| 2000 | 2,569 | | 12.3% |
| 2010 | 2,473 | | −3.7% |
| 2020 | 2,218 | | −10.3% |
U.S. Decennial Census

As of the census of 2020, there were 2,218 people, 988 households, and 700 families residing in the town. The population density was 83.2 inhabitants per square mile (32.1/km^{2}). There were 1,161 housing units at an average density of 37.6 per square mile (14.5/km^{2}). The racial makeup of the town was 96.26% white, .90% black or African American, .66% Native American, .66% Asian, .47% from other races, and 1.05% from two or more races. Hispanic or Latino of any race were 1.36% of the population.

There were 988 households, out of which 33.5% had children under the age of 18 living with them, 55.6% were married couples living together, 10.1% had a female householder with no husband present, and 29.1% were non-families. 23.0% of all households were made up of individuals, and 9.9% had someone living alone who was 65 years of age or older. The average household size was 2.60 and the average family size was 3.03.

In the town, the population was spread out, with 25.9% under the age of 18, 6.4% from 18 to 24, 27.2% from 25 to 44, 25.6% from 45 to 64, and 14.9% who were 65 years of age or older. The median age was 40 years. For every 100 females, there were 93.2 males. For every 100 females age 18 and over, there were 94.7 males.

The median income for a household in the town was $43,125, and the median income for a family was $46,900. Males had a median income of $35,417 versus $26,645 for females. The per capita income for the town was $24,259. About 5.7% of families and 9.2% of the population were below the poverty line, including 14.0% of those under age 18 and 2.3% of those age 65 or over.

== Communities and locations ==
- Bethel – A hamlet in the south-central part of town.
- Hammertown – A hamlet east of Pine Plains village.
- Mount Ross – A location in the northwestern corner of the town.
- Pachin Mills – A hamlet in the northern part of the town, near the Columbia County border.
- Pine Plains – The hamlet of Pine Plains, located in the center of the town.
- Pulver's Corners – A location in the northeastern section of the town.

== Points of interest ==
- Graham-Brush Log House
- The Pines
- Stissing Mountain and Thompson Pond Preserve
- Evergreen Cemetery

== Government and emergency services ==
=== Government ===
Pine Plains operates under a council-manager form of government. The town supervisor is the chief administrative officer of the city selected to carry out the directives of the council. The manager monitors the town's fiscal condition and enforces its ordinances and laws. The town supervisor is also involved in the discussion of all matters coming before council yet has no final vote. The town board is the legislative body consisting of the town supervisor and four council members. The town supervisor serves as the presiding officer of the council. The council functions to set policy, approve the annual budget, appoint the town supervisor and town clerk, and enact local laws, resolutions & ordinances.

=== Fire and emergency medical services ===
The Pine Plains Fire District serves the town of Pine Plains as well as a portion of the town of Gallatin in southern Columbia County. With the sole fire station located in the center of the town at the corner of Lake Rd and South Main St, Pine Plains has been assigned a department ID number of "55". Firefighters in Pine Plains get alerted via paging through the Dutchess County Department Of Emergency Response, as well as text notifications to phones. Roughly 20 active members respond to any emergencies 24/7. The fire department is 100% volunteer.

The Pine Plains Hose Company is made up of two fire engines for fire calls (55-11, 12), one tanker (55-31), one heavy rescue for car accidents and specialty incidents (55-51), and one brush truck and one ATV for brush fire and off-road capabilities (55-61, 55-96). The Pine Plains Rescue Squad operates one basic life support ambulances (55-71) and responds to medical emergencies in the district. These ambulances are able to handle many of the medical calls. Empress EMS is the paramedic provider for the town and are headquartered in Poughkeepsie, NY. They are called upon if the medical call requires a higher level of care.

=== Police ===
Police protection to the Town of Pine Plains includes three different entities; Pine Plains Police, Dutchess County Sheriff's Office and New York State Police. The local town of Pine Plains police force is a part-time force, providing coverage roughly half of the week, at different times. The department includes three patrol cars and eight officers as of 2026 with hopes of continued expansion. When someone calls 911, the call is routed to the Dutchess County 911 center in Hyde Park and then police are polled for and the closest unit responds.

=== Medical ===
Pine Plains has one small medical facility in the form of a Veteran's Affairs clinic. The town lies within a short distance from four medical centers. These include Northern Dutchess Hospital in Rhinebeck, Sharon Hospital in Sharon, CT, Vassar Brothers Medical Center in the City of Poughkeepsie, and MidHudson Regional Hospital located in the town of Poughkeepsie, New York.

== Schools ==
Pine Plains is the center of the Pine Plains Central School District. The district comprises parts or all of nine towns, spanning two counties; Ancram, Clermont, Gallatin & Livingston in Columbia County and Clinton, Milan, North East, Pine Plains & Stanford in Dutchess County. Roughly 750 students make up the student body as of 2026. Two of the three schools making up the district lay within the town of Pine Plains, including Seymour Smith Intermediate Learning Center (grades 3–5) and Stissing Mountain Jr/Sr High School.

== Transportation ==
Wassaic station on Metro-North Railroad's Harlem Line is located 13 miles south of Pine Plains. The Rhinecliff Station on Amtrak's line is about 18 miles to the west.

== Culture ==
From 1920 into the 1970s, Stissing Lake was the site of the Stissing Lake camps (boys' facilities on the east side, girls' on the west). There an adolescent, Jerry Herman, son of the owners, honed his musical skills during the 1940s, leading many years later to his Tony award-winning shows Hello, Dolly! and La Cage aux Folles, and other Broadway musicals such as the hit Mame. Pine Plains was the original home of Tri-Arts, located in the Carvel Theatre.

Starting in 2016, talk of major renovations to a large town building started. The building would come to be known as Memorial Hall. Originally built in 1915 and serving as a theater for silent films, then as a first-run cinema, as well as vaudeville shows. In 1975 after the original foundation ran out of money, it was reconfigured into a number of different shops. With many changes and overhauls, Memorial Hall morphed into The Stissing Center, with continuing renovations as of 2023.

In addition to several cattle farms, Pine Plains is also the home to many horse farms. Berkshire Stud farm which has had several horses race in the Kentucky Derby, including Audible who was foaled here in 2015. The former Briarcliff farms location is also home to the current Mashomack Polo club which has been home to many cup events throughout its history.

== Notable people ==
- Philip Amelio, (1977–2005); actor and teacher
- Thomas Carvel, (1906–1990); Greek-born American businessman of Carvel Ice Cream fame
- Lenora Champagne (b.1951); American playwright and actor
- Thom Christoper, (b. 1940–2024); television and stage actor
- John Michael Doar, (1921–2014); civil rights lawyer
- Matt Finley, (b. 1951); Brazilian Jazz musician
- Don Hastings, (b. 1934); actor of "As the World Turns" fame
- Priscilla Herdman, (b. 1948); American folk singer
- John Eric Herlitz, (1942–2008); car designer of Plymouth Barracuda fame
- Fred Hersch, (b.1955); Grammy-nominated jazz pianist
- Eileen Hickey, (1945–1999); Dutchess County politician
- Andrew Jarecki, (b. 1963); Emmy Award-winning filmmaker
- Evelyn Fox Keller, (1936–2023); Physicist and author
- Shannon M. (née Smith) Kent, (1983–2019); United States Navy cryptologic technician
- Eleanora Knopf, (1883–1974); prominent American Geologist who spent many years studying Stissing Mountain in the town
- Tyler Lydon, (b. 1996); NBA Player who went to High School in Pine Plains
- Robert Lyons (b.1959); American director and playwright
- George Morgan, (1816–1879); New York State politician
- William Snyder, (1864–1934); Head keeper at the Central Park Zoo
- Charles B. Wessler (b.1955); American film producer
- Carleton Bates Varney, (1937–2022); American designer
- Tim and Nina Zagat, (b. 1940 & b.1942); founders and publishers of Zagat Restaurant Surveys

== Gallery ==
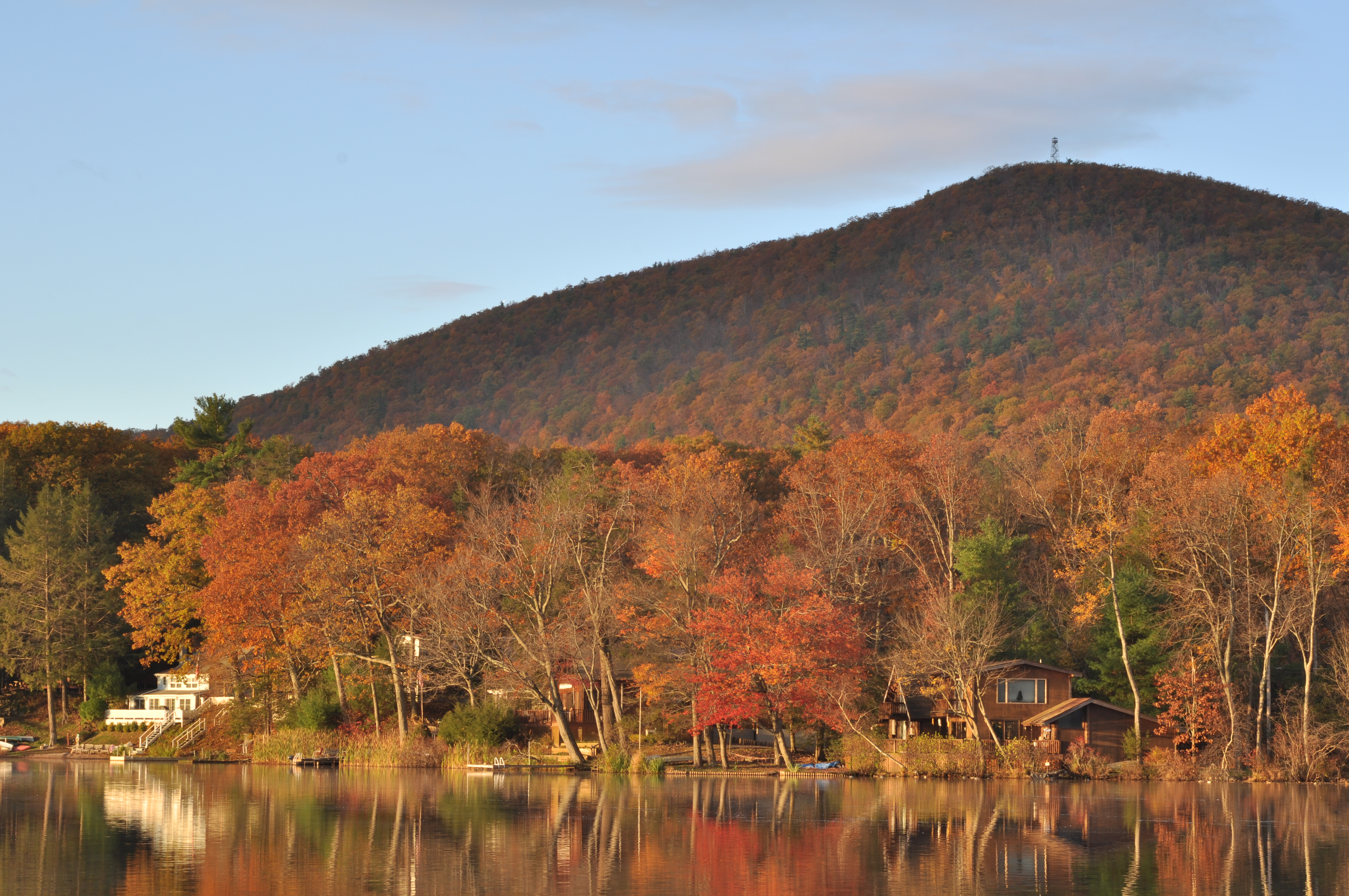
Stissing Mountain and pond

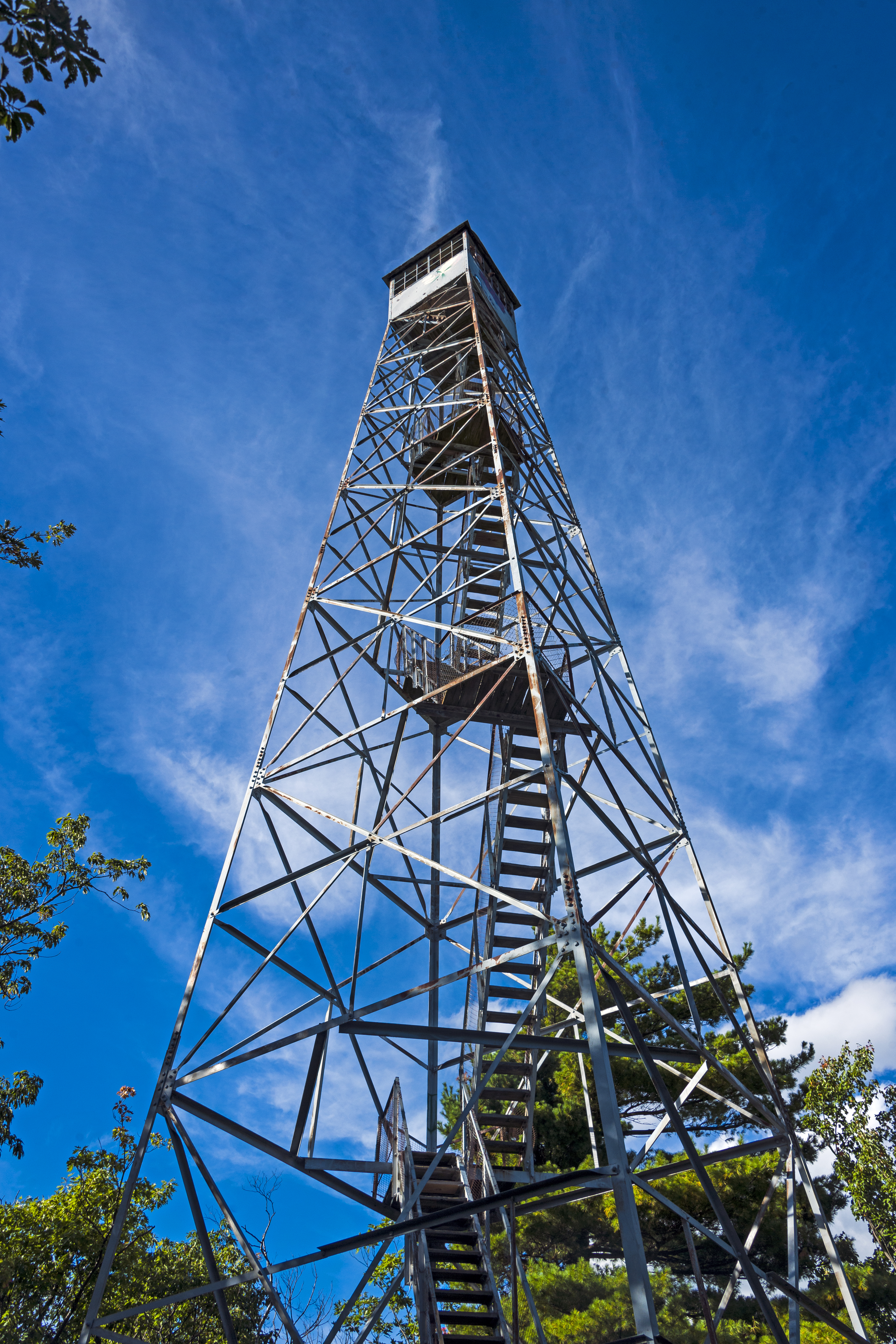
Stissing Mountain fire tower

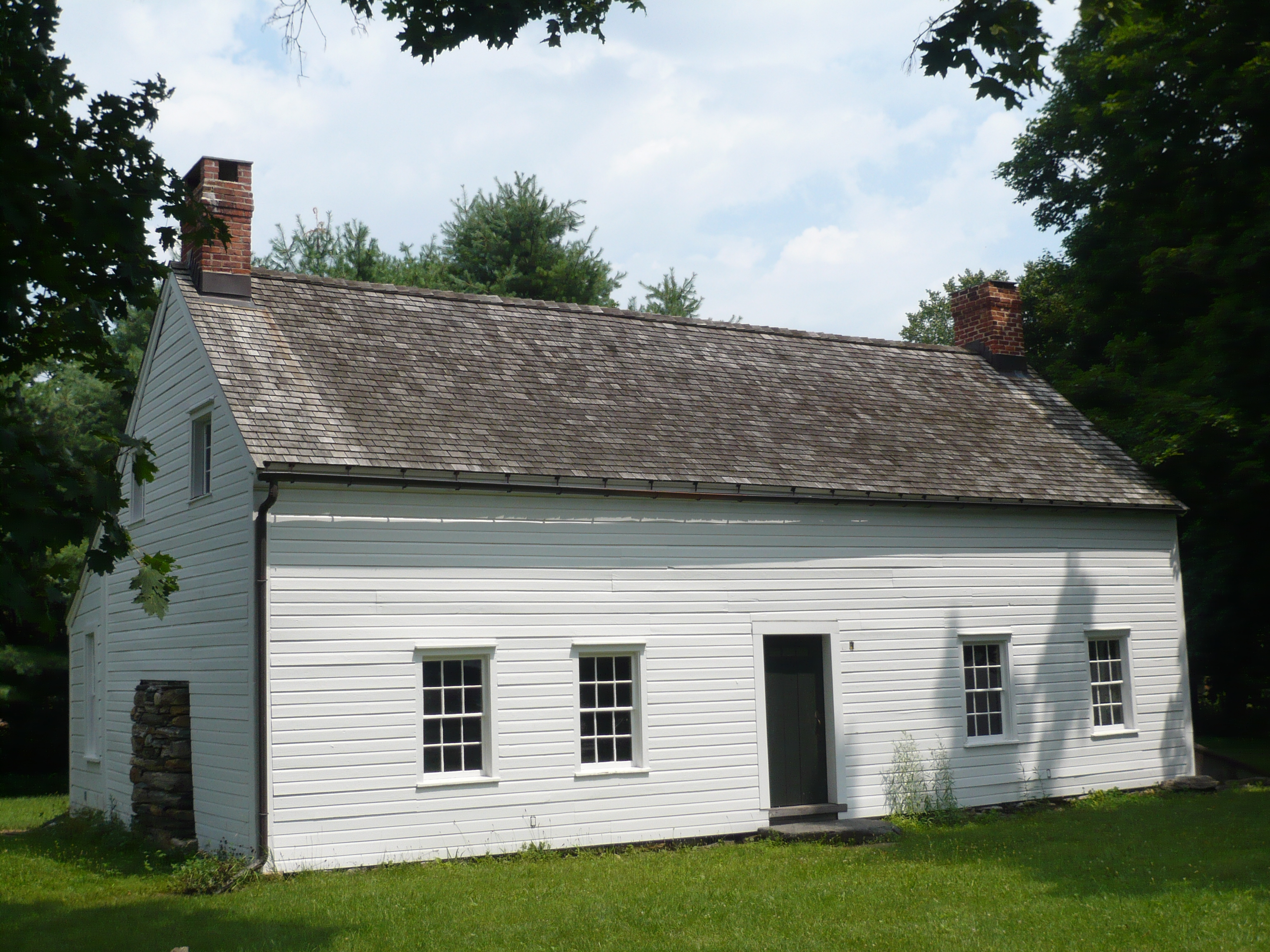
Graham-Brush Log House

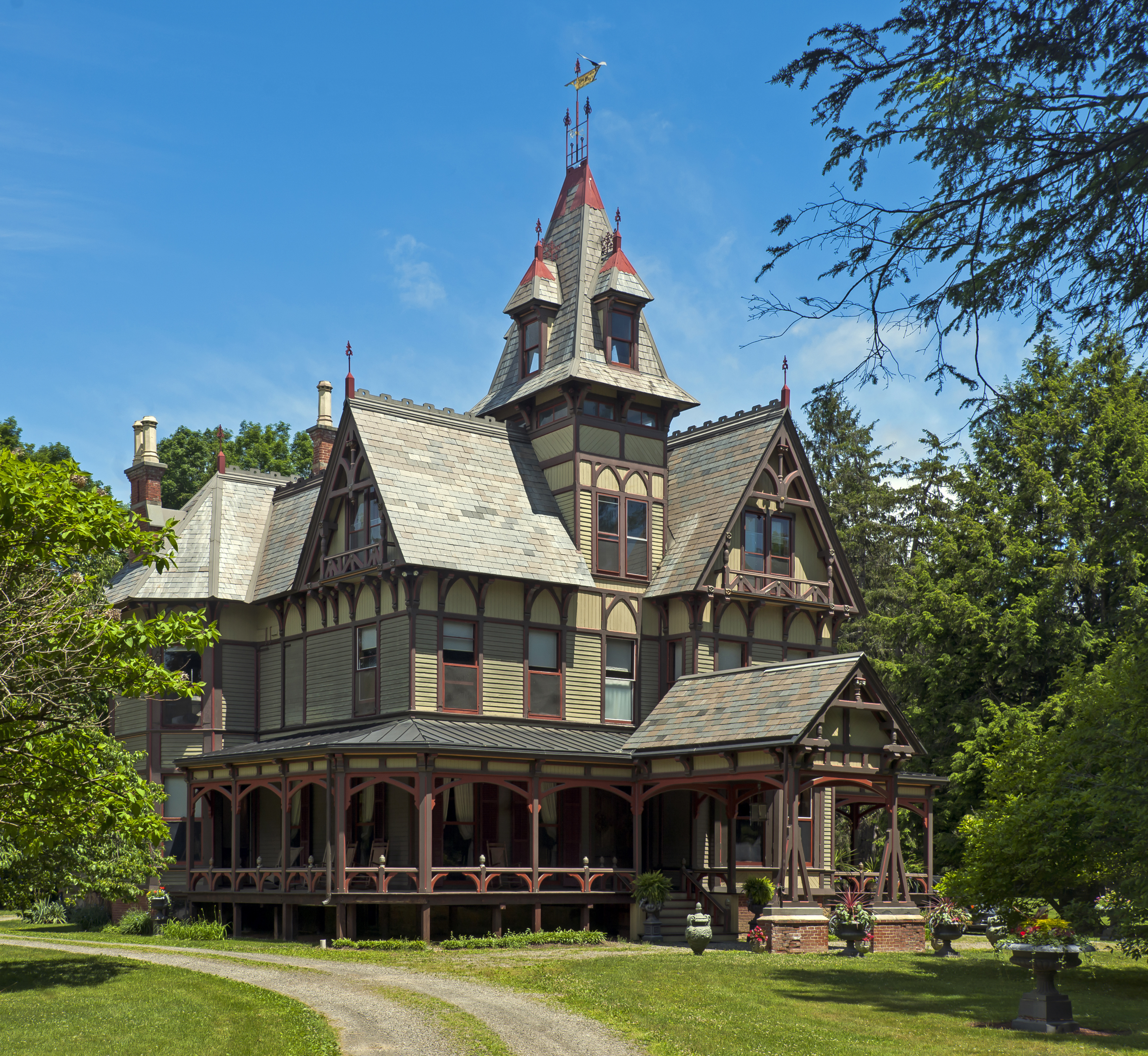
The Pines

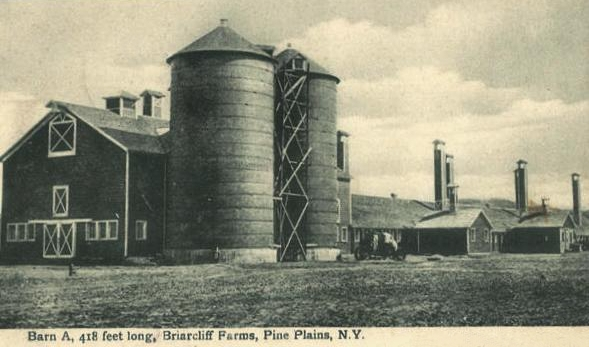
Briarcliff Farms

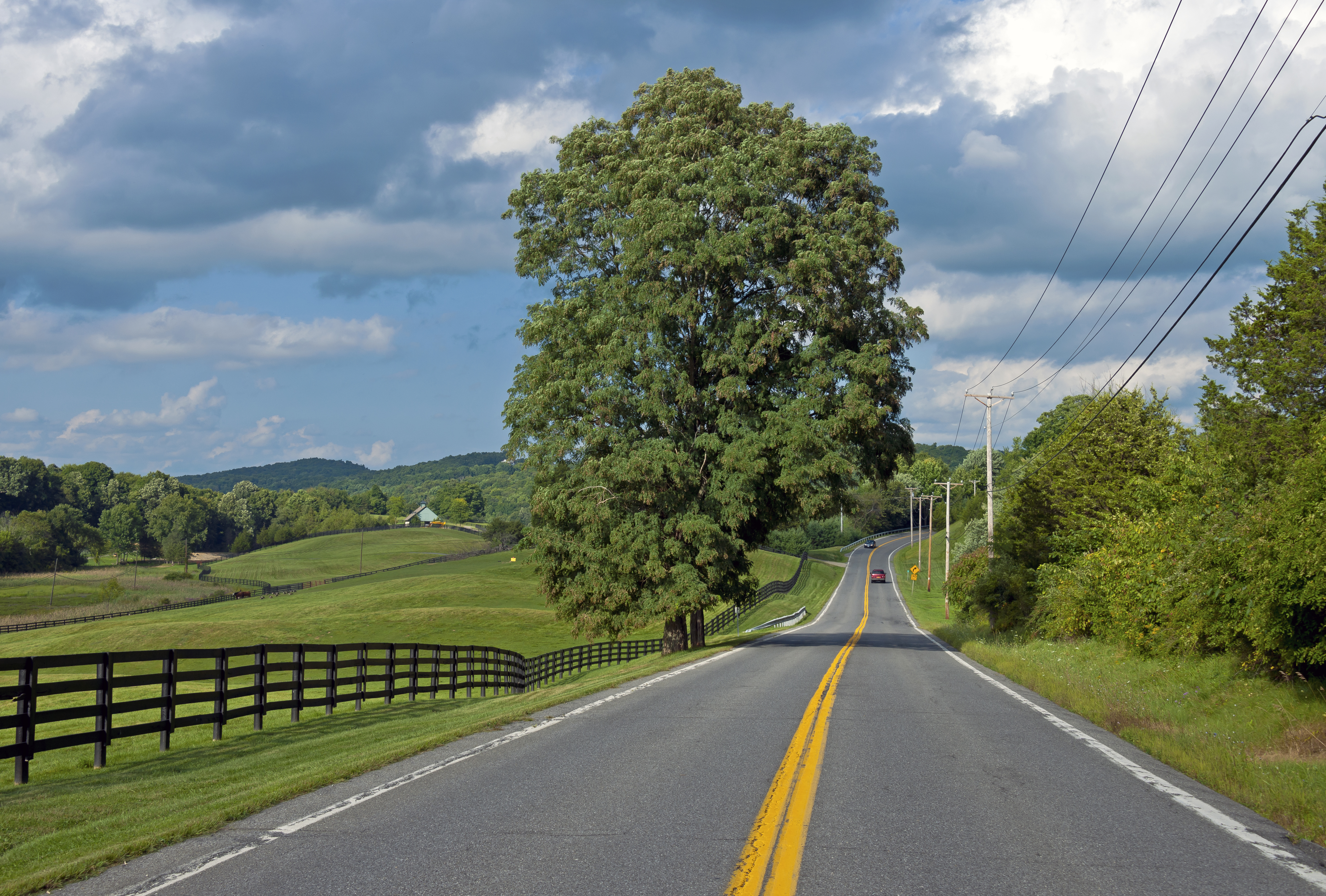
NY 199 East of Pine Plains

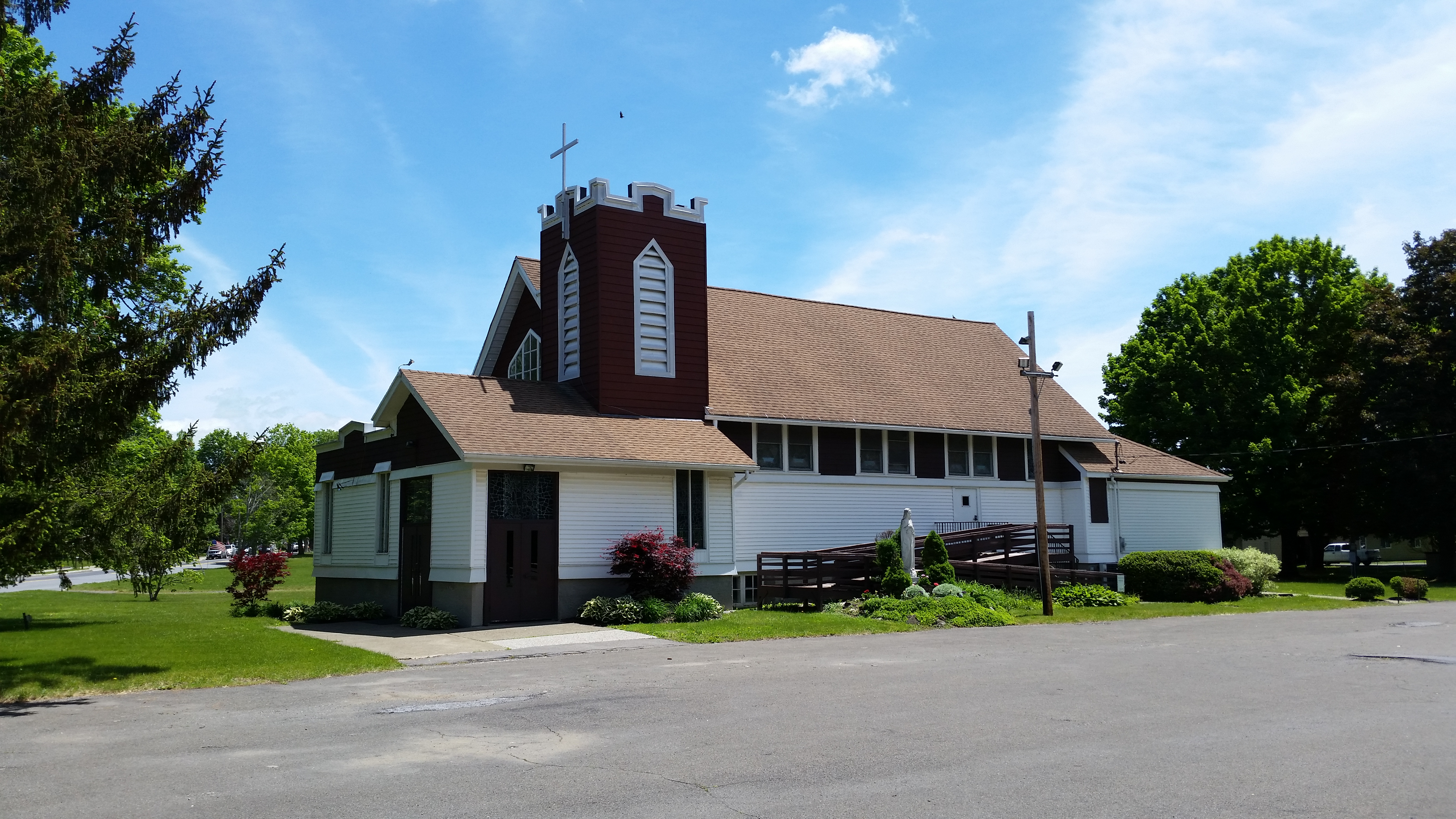
Church of St. Anthony

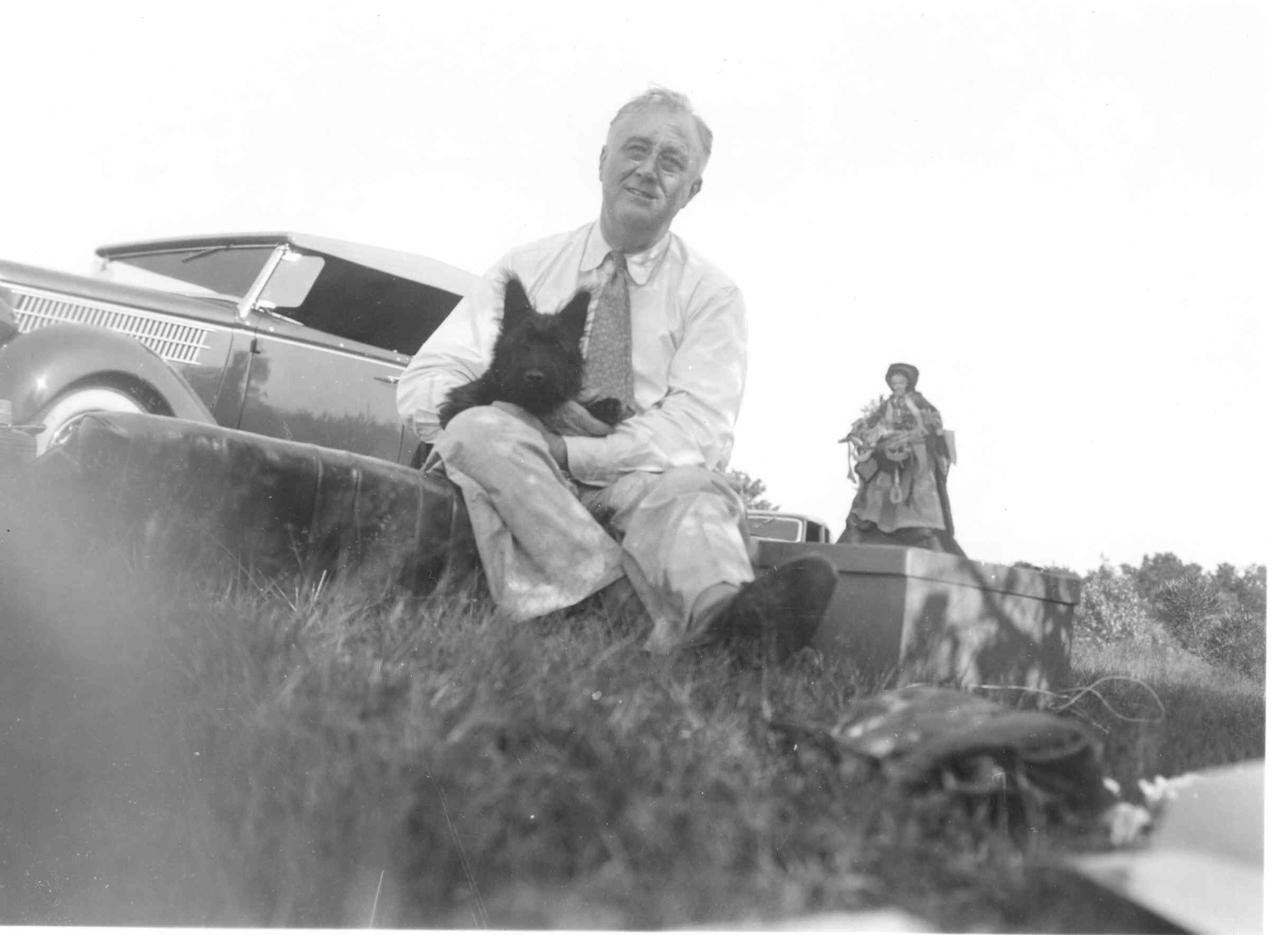
FDR with his dog fala on "sunset hill" overlooking Pine Plains
