= Pine Plains (CDP), New York =

Pine Plains, New York
- Census-designated place
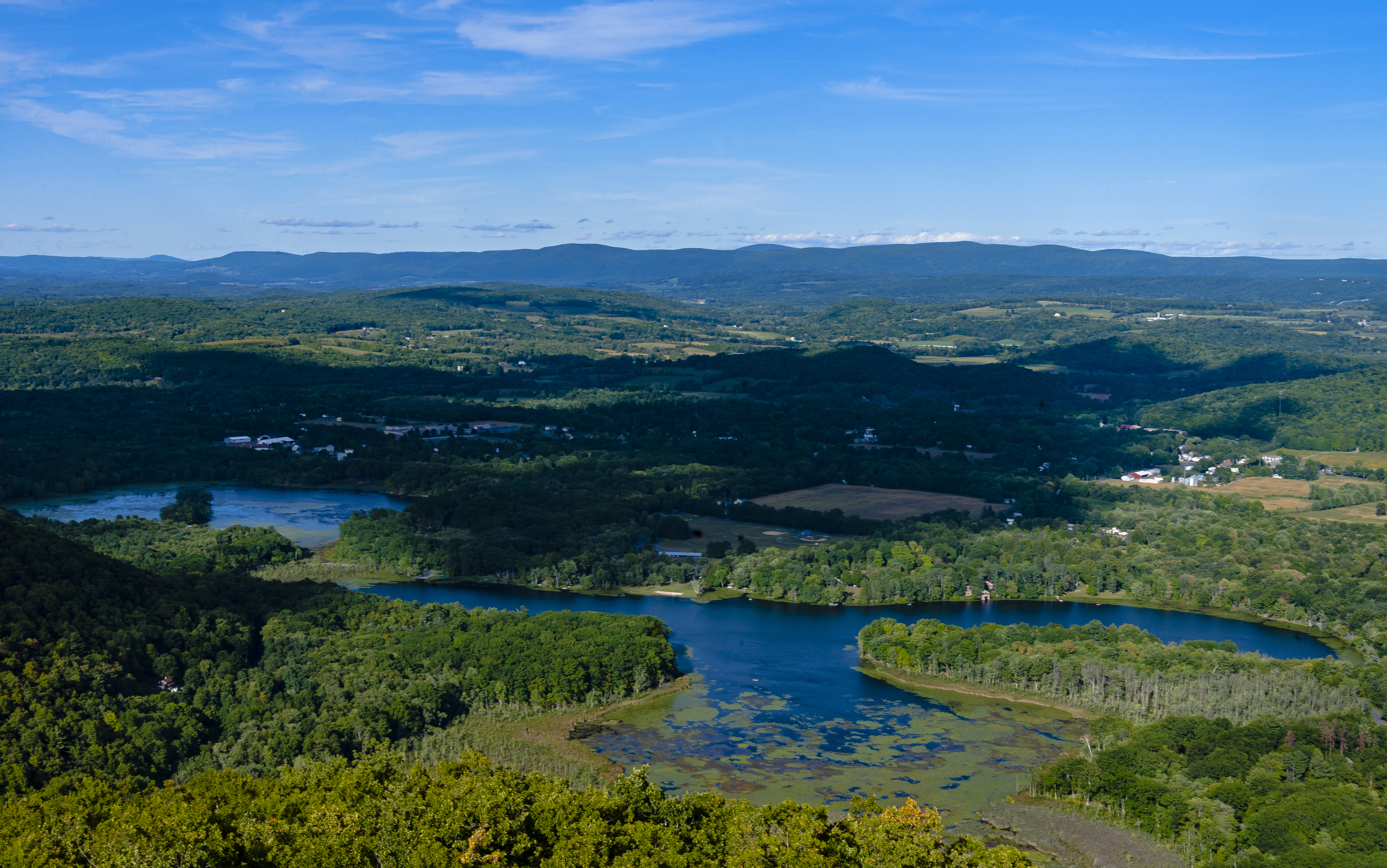
- Pine Plains from the fire tower on Stissing Mountain to the southeast

- Location of Pine Plains, New York
- Coordinates: 41°58′44″N 73°39′41″W
- Country: United States
- State: New York
- County: Dutchess
- Town: Pine Plains

Area
  - Total: 2.30 sq mi (5.96 km^{2})
  - Land: 2.08 sq mi (5.39 km^{2})
  - Water: 0.22 sq mi (0.57 km^{2})
- Elevation: 469 ft (143 m)

Population (2020)
  - Total: 1,142
  - Density: 548.9/sq mi (211.94/km^{2})
- Time zone: UTC-5 (EST)
  - Summer (DST): UTC-4 (EDT)
- ZIP code: 12567
- Area code: 518
- FIPS code: 36-58145
- GNIS feature ID: 0960532

Pine Plains is a hamlet and census-designated place (CDP) in Dutchess County, New York, United States. The population was 1,142 at the 2020 census. It is part of the Poughkeepsie–Newburgh–Middletown, NY Metropolitan Statistical Area as well as the larger New York–Newark–Bridgeport, NY-NJ-CT-PA Combined Statistical Area.

The community of Pine Plains is in the town of Pine Plains.

== Geography ==
Pine Plains is located near the northern edge of Dutchess County at 41°58′43″N 73°39′40″W (41.97882, -73.661254), in the central portion of the town of Pine Plains. It is bordered to the northeast by Shekomeko Creek, a tributary of the Roeliff Jansen Kill, which flows northwest to the Hudson River.

New York State Routes 199 and 82 pass through the community. NY 199 (Church Street) leads east 9 miles (14 km) to Millerton and west 14 miles (23 km) to Red Hook. NY 82 enters the community as South Main Street, then turns east on Church Street with NY 199. NY 82 leads south 9 miles (14 km) to Stanfordville and north 9 miles (14 km) by a winding route to Ancram. Poughkeepsie, the Dutchess County seat, is 27 miles (43 km) to the southwest via NY 82 and U.S. Route 44.

According to the United States Census Bureau, the Pine Plains CDP has a total area of 2.3 square miles (6.0 km^{2}), of which 2.1 square miles (5.4 km^{2}) is land and 0.23 square miles (0.6 km^{2}), or 9.73%, is water. The CDP includes two water bodies, Stissing Pond and Twin Island Lake, southwest of the center of town.

== Demographics ==
Historical population
Census	Pop.	Note	%±
2000	1,412		—
2010	1,353		−4.2%
2020	1,142		−15.6%
U.S. Decennial Census

As of the census of 2000, there were 1,412 people, 544 households, and 368 families residing in the CDP. The population density was 674.5 inhabitants per square mile (260.4/km^{2}). There were 611 housing units at an average density of 291.9 per square mile (112.7/km^{2}). The racial makeup of the CDP was 96.67% White, 0.42% Black or African American, 0.28% Native American, 0.42% Asian, 0.71% from other races, and 1.49% from two or more races. Hispanic or Latino of any race were 1.42% of the population.

There were 544 households, out of which 32.9% had children under the age of 18 living with them, 52.8% were married couples living together, 9.7% had a female householder with no husband present, and 32.2% were non-families. 26.5% of all households were made up of individuals, and 12.5% had someone living alone who was 65 years of age or older. The average household size was 2.59 and the average family size was 3.09.

In the CDP, the population was spread out, with 26.7% under the age of 18, 6.3% from 18 to 24, 26.0% from 25 to 44, 25.4% from 45 to 64, and 15.6% who were 65 years of age or older. The median age was 40 years. For every 100 females, there were 89.3 males. For every 100 females age 18 and over, there were 90.6 males.

The median income for a household in the CDP was $43,548, and the median income for a family was $49,844. Males had a median income of $39,896 versus $25,682 for females. The per capita income for the CDP was $23,627. About 10.1% of families and 13.3% of the population were below the poverty line, including 24.9% of those under age 18 and 2.0% of those age 65 or over.
