= Lenora Champagne =

American playwright and performing artist

- Born: 1951 (age 74–75); Opelousas, Louisiana, U.S.
- Education: Louisiana State University (BA); New York University (MA, PhD)
- Occupations: Playwright; performance artist; director; professor
- Spouse: Robert Lyons
- Children: 1

Lenora Champagne (born 1951) is an American playwright and performing artist.

== Early years ==
Champagne was born in Opelousas, Louisiana, in 1951 to bilingual parents. Her father was a farmer and ran a general store in Port Barre, Louisiana, where she grew up. As a child, Champagne wanted to be a doctor. She studied literature and visual art at Louisiana State University, where she was involved in the antiwar and women's movements. After receiving her BA in English in 1972, she moved to New York City at age 20, where she painted. While working as a secretary at the New York University Law School, she enrolled in graduate school and began writing about experimental theater.

== Career ==
After observing Théâtre du Soleil and other political theater companies in France in 1974, she started creating performance pieces and directing. Her early works were "talking dances." She completed a PhD in Performance Studies in 1980.

From 1993 to 2000, she was a member playwright at New Dramatists. In 1995, she spent time in Canada through an NEA artist's residency grant. In 2013, she taught in Japan as part of a Fulbright grant. Champagne is a professor emerita in theater and performance at Purchase College, SUNY, where she began teaching in 1990, and full-time since in 1999.

Champagne frequently collaborates with sculptors, media artists and installation artists. Her live performances can be seen in galleries and arts spaces such as Franklin Furnace, the New Museum, and Creative Time's Art on the Beach. She also co-created an installation for the New Museum's Art Mall as Social Space show in 1992.

== Works ==
Champagne is the author of one book and also a number of essays, plays and performance texts.

- French Theatre Experiment Since 1968 (1984) ISBN 978-0835715386
- Out from Under: Texts by Women Performance Artists (editor, contributor) (1990) ISBN 978-1559360098

Plays include:

- Women in Research (1981–82)
- Getting Over Tom (1982) published in Out From Under
- Manna (1983)
- Flying Home (1983–84)
- The Way to the River (1984)
- Reptile Warmth (1984–85)
- From the Red Light District (1984–85)
- Fractured Juliet (1985–86)
- The Eye of the Garden (1985)
- Home (1986)
- As Ready, Apart from Herself (1986)
- Winter Heat (1987)
- Fractured Tales from There to Here (1987)
- Sarah Bernhardt Meets Her Waterloo (1987)
- Women without Parts (1988)
- Out from Under (1989)
- Dr. Charcot’s Hysteria Shows (1988–89)
- On, Say, Can You See? (1990)
- Isabella Dreams the New World (1993) in New World Plays (2015) ISBN 978-1-329-07882-6
- With You the Rest of… (1991)
- The Knowledge Project (1992)
- Creole, a Tropical Fantasy (1993)
- A Tourist’s Guide to the Big Easy (1996)
- The Best Things in Life for 3 actors (1994)
- The Best Things in Life solo (1993)
- Valentine’s Day, 1980 (1996)
- Flying Home (1996)
- My Nebraska (1996) in New World Plays
- Wants for 3 actors (1996)
- Wants solo (1997)
- The Singing: a cyberspace opera (book and lyrics) with composer Daniel Levy (1998)
- Dusk (2000)
- Coaticook (2002) in New World Plays
- The Mama Dramas (2002)
- Memoirs of a Cajun-American Princess (2003)
- Mother’s Little Helper (2003)
- La Recherche du Pain Perdu (2006)
- L'heure blue (2007)
- Traces/fades (2007)
- Staying Afloat (2008)
- Photo Finish (2010)
- Memory's Storehouse (2011)

== Awards ==
Selected awards include:

- Richard Rodgers Award from the American Academy of Arts and Letters for The Singing: a cyberspace opera
- 1993 Native Voices/Native Visions Playwriting Award for Isabella Dreams the New World
- 1996 Jane Chambers Playwriting Award for Wants (for 3 actors)
- NYFA Fellowship in Playwriting in 1998
- NYFA Fellowship in Performance Art in 2003

== Personal life ==
Champagne lives in New York City's West Village with her husband, playwright and director Robert Lyons, and their daughter Amelie.
