= Robert Lyons (writer) =

American writer, playwright and director (born 1959)

- Born: Robert Lyons; July 6, 1959 (age 67); Detroit, Michigan, U.S.
- Education: Michigan State University (BA)
- Occupations: Playwright; writer; director
- Spouse: Lenora Champagne
- Children: 1

Robert Lyons (born July 6, 1959) is an American writer, playwright and director, best known as the artistic director the two-time OBIE Award-winning New Ohio Theatre in Manhattan.

== Early years ==
Robert Lyons was born in Detroit, Michigan, and grew up in the suburbs of the city. His father worked as a white-collar employee for Chrysler and his mother as a secretary in the public school system. He graduated from Michigan State University with a BA in English and then worked as a poet and short story writer.

Lyons first became interested in theater after graduating from college. According to Lyons, "I was bumming around the East coast, and I saw a theatre company do an opening act for Luther "Guitar Junior" Johnson in a dive bar in Gloucester, Massachusetts. I hung out with the actors and director at the bar during the set, and I thought they seemed pretty cool. That night I rewrote a short story into a play ..."

The play he had seen was by Israel Horovitz. Lyons located a summer internship at People's Light and Theatre in Pennsylvania where he found Murphy Guyer as a role model. At the end of the summer, Lyons directed a play he had written and won a $50 prize for Best Intern Show.

== Career ==
In 1987 Lyons was working as the production manager for a company called Project III that produced a show at the off-off-Broadway Ohio Theatre. Finding the space often sat empty, he contacted its founders and the landlords and offered to supervise it. He ran the 90-seat theater for 23 years, setting up innovative and cutting-edge performances. In 2008 the building was sold. When the new landlords refused to renew his lease in 2010, the theater closed, and Lyons established the New Ohio Theatre in the West Village.

Besides being active as a playwright and director, Lyons also teaches theater courses at Sarah Lawrence College.

== Works ==
Lyons is a prolific playwright. Selected works include:

My Onliness

Yovo

Last Gasp of the Liberal Class

- Nostradamus Predicts the Death of Soho
- Red-Haired Thomas
- Doorman’s Double Duty
- PR Man
- No Meat No Irony
- The Naked Anarchist
- Dream Conspiracy
- Creature of the Deep
- No Thanks/Thanks
- Vater Knows Best
- Floor Boards
- Lush Valley

Commissioned works include:

- The Possessed by Dostoevsky
- How it Ended by Jay McInerney.

== Personal life ==
Lyons lives in New York City's West Village with his wife, playwright and director Lenora Champagne, and their daughter Amelie.
