= Philip Amelio =

American actor and teacher (1977–2005)

- Born: Philip John Amelio II; November 3, 1977; Sharon, Connecticut, U.S.
- Died: April 1, 2005 (aged 27); Boston, Massachusetts, U.S.
- Occupation: Actor/Teacher
- Years active: 1986–1991

Philip John Amelio II (3 November 1977 – 1 April 2005) was an American actor and teacher. At age nine, he played Lucille Ball's grandson on the Life With Lucy series.

== Early life ==
Philip was born in Sharon, Connecticut and grew up in nearby Pine Plains, New York. Philip's younger sister, Lindsey Cook Amelio, also appeared on television, including three TV movies, and as spokesperson for 9Lives cat food, with Morris the Cat. At one point during their careers, both siblings' faces were on every major network in one form or another.

In addition to 1986's Life With Lucy, Amelio's career included a three-year run (1988–1991) on the daytime soap opera, All My Children, and a long string of commercials. He started acting at age four, when he was cast for a Pepperidge Farm commercial. This led to campaigns for Ford Motors, All laundry detergent, and Shake 'N' Bake bread crumbs. Amelio was the first spokesperson for Jell-O Pudding Snacks.

On All My Children, Amelio played Scott Chandler, the son of Cindy Chandler, who succumbed to AIDS on the show. After his on-screen mother's death, the character of Scott was adopted by his stepfather, Stuart Chandler (portrayed by David Canary).

Amelio officially retired from show business at age 13 and concentrated on being a "normal teenager" and student.

== Career in education and sports ==
His love of language and history led Amelio to study to be a teacher. He graduated from the University at Albany and received a master's degree in Education at The College of Saint Rose. For the last two years of his life, Amelio was employed at Duanesburg High School in Delanson, New York as a full-time teacher and modified baseball coach.

== Death ==
In March 2005, after complaining of a sore back, Amelio was diagnosed with a bacterial infection of the heart valve. His condition deteriorated rapidly and he died on 1 April 2005, at age 27, in Boston, Massachusetts from an infection. In his memory, Amelio's father established the Philip J. Amelio, II Scholarship Fund, offered to impoverished schoolchildren who reside in the Pine Plains Central School District and the Duanesburg Central School District to help them maintain their education.
