= Federal Office Building (New York City) =

- U.S. National Register of Historic Places
- New York State Register of Historic Places
- New York City Landmark
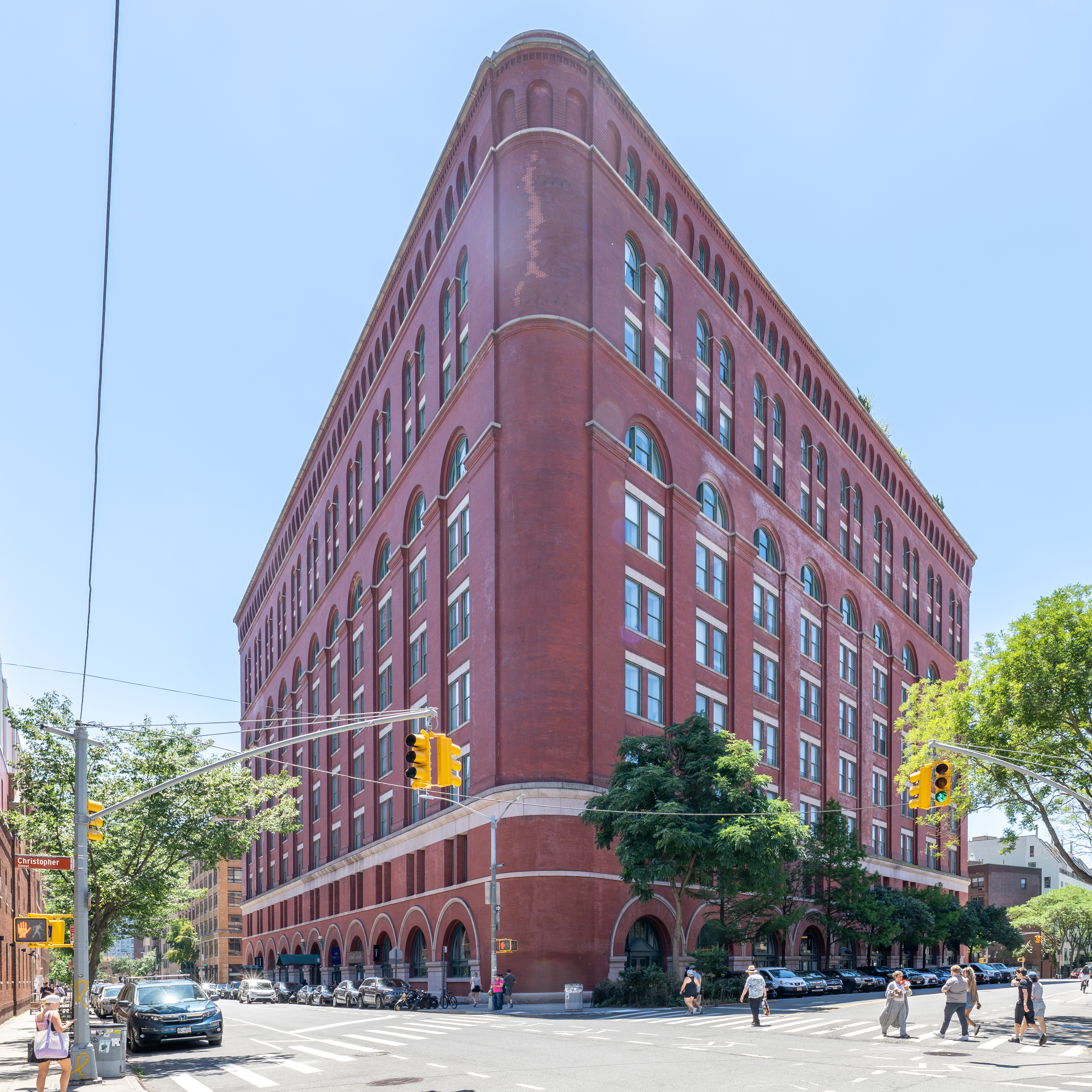
- Location: 641 Washington St., New York City
- Coordinates: 40°43′56″N 74°00′31″W
- Built: 1892-94; 1896-98
- Architect: Office of the Supervising Architect
- Architectural style: Romanesque
- NRHP reference No.: 74001267
- NYSRHP No.: 06101.000006
- NYCL No.: 0211

Significant dates
- Added to NRHP: August 30, 1974
- Designated NYSRHP: June 23, 1980
- Designated NYCL: March 14, 1966

The Federal Office Building (also known as the United States Appraisers' Warehouse or The Archive) is a residential building in the West Village of Manhattan, New York City. It was built in 1892–1899 to designs by Willoughby J. Edbrooke. The ten-story Romanesque style building is bounded by Christopher, Greenwich, Barrow, and Washington Streets. Though Edbrooke died before the completion of the building, his influence and the influence of the Chicago School of Architecture is evident.

== History ==
The construction of the building was authorized by Congress in 1888. Construction began under the direction of supervising architect Edbrooke in 1892, comprising the first two floors of the building. This work was completed in 1894. An additional eight floors were added from 1896 to 1898, under the direction of William Martin Aiken, supervising architect from 1895 to 1897. Construction was completed in 1898 by his successor, James Knox Taylor. The building served as a storehouse, in which customs agents would examine and assess imported goods to set valuations and duties. The initial design had a central, open court to provide light and air to the building interior. The building was used to this end until the 1930s, when the government converted it into an office building, the United States Federal Building. This housed offices of several government agencies, including the National Archives and Records Administration. These agencies moved out in the 1970s and 1980s, and the building was sold to the Urban Development Corporation in 1982 and leased to Rockrose Partners.

The building was converted for residential uses, adding an atrium, and is now known as The Archive after its former tenant. This work was completed in 1988, the architects for the conversion being Warner, Burns, Toan & Lunde. The Continuum Club gym leased space in the building in 2024.

== See also ==
- National Register of Historic Places listings in Manhattan below 14th Street
- List of New York City Designated Landmarks in Manhattan below 14th Street

== Sources ==
- Landau, Sarah; Condit, Carl W. (1996). Rise of the New York Skyscraper, 1865–1913. New Haven, CT: Yale University Press. ISBN 978-0-300-07739-1. OCLC 32819286.
