= Stanford, New York =

- Town
- Seal

- Location of Stanford, New York
- Coordinates: 41°53′2″N 73°42′12″W
- Country: United States
- State: New York
- County: Dutchess

Government
  - Type: Town Council
  - Town Supervisor: Julia Descoteaux (D)
  - Deputy Supervisor: Eric Haims (I)
  - Town Council: Charlie Cunningham (D) Nathan Lavertue (D) Theodore Secor (D)

Area
  - Total: 50.29 sq mi (130.24 km^{2})
  - Land: 49.64 sq mi (128.56 km^{2})
  - Water: 0.65 sq mi (1.68 km^{2})
- Elevation: 400 ft (122 m)

Population (2020)
  - Total: 3,682
- Time zone: UTC−5 (Eastern (EST))
  - Summer (DST): UTC−4 (EDT)
- ZIP Codes: 12581 (Stanfordville); 12506 (Bangall); 12501 (Amenia); 12514 (Clinton Corners); 12545 (Millbrook); 12567 (Pine Plains)
- FIPS code: 36-027-70662
- GNIS feature ID: 0979519
- Website: stanfordny.gov

Stanford is a town in the north-central part of Dutchess County, New York, United States. The population was 3,628 at the 2020 census, down from 3,823 at the 2010 census.

== History ==
Stanford was first settled circa 1750. The town was part of the Great Nine Partners Patent of 1697. The town of Stanford was formed in 1793 from the town of Washington.

== Geography ==
According to the United States Census Bureau, the town has a total area of 50.3 square miles (130.2 km^{2}), of which 49.7 square miles (128.6 km^{2}) is land and 0.66 square miles (1.7 km^{2}), or 1.29%, is water.

== Demographics ==
Historical population
Census	Pop.	Note	%±
1820	2,518		—
1830	2,521		0.1%
1840	2,278		−9.6%
1850	2,158		−5.3%
1860	2,323		7.6%
1870	2,116		−8.9%
1880	2,092		−1.1%
1890	1,859		−11.1%
1900	1,624		−12.6%
1910	1,520		−6.4%
1920	1,368		−10.0%
1930	1,269		−7.2%
1940	1,386		9.2%
1950	1,473		6.3%
1960	1,614		9.6%
1970	2,479		53.6%
1980	3,319		33.9%
1990	3,495		5.3%
2000	3,544		1.4%
2010	3,823		7.9%
2020	3,682		−3.7%
U.S. Decennial Census 2020

As of the census of 2000, there were 3,544 people, 1,398 households, and 973 families residing in the town. The population density was 70.9 inhabitants per square mile (27.4/km^{2}). There were 1,712 housing units at an average density of 34.2 per square mile (13.2/km^{2}). The racial makeup of the town was 94.95% White, 1.52% African American, 0.20% Native American, 1.10% Asian, 0.03% Pacific Islander, 0.82% from other races, and 1.38% from two or more races. Hispanic or Latino of any race were 2.65% of the population.

There were 1,398 households, out of which 31.3% had children under the age of 18 living with them, 59.6% were married couples living together, 6.6% had a female householder with no husband present, and 30.4% were non-families. 24.9% of all households were made up of individuals, and 7.7% had someone living alone who was 65 years of age or older. The average household size was 2.49 and the average family size was 2.99.

In the town, the population was spread out, with 23.4% under the age of 18, 5.8% from 18 to 24, 28.2% from 25 to 44, 30.4% from 45 to 64, and 12.3% who were 65 years of age or older. The median age was 41 years. For every 100 females, there were 102.7 males. For every 100 females age 18 and over, there were 101.2 males.

The median income for a household in the town was $54,118, and the median income for a family was $62,171. Males had a median income of $40,746 versus $30,625 for females. The per capita income for the town was $29,236. About 2.7% of families and 4.3% of the population were below the poverty line, including 3.4% of those under age 18 and 8.4% of those age 65 or over.

== Notable people ==
- Alfred Mosher Butts, inventor of Scrabble
- James Cagney, actor
- George Washington Gale, minister
- David Levering Lewis, history professor at New York University and winner of the Pulitzer Prize for his biography of Martin Luther King
- Kermit Love, puppeteer, costume designer, and actor
- H. David Politzer, 2004 Nobel laureate (physics)
- Issac R. Sherwood, Union Army officer and United States congressman

== Communities and locations in Stanford ==
- Attlebury – A hamlet in the northeastern corner of the town.
- Bangall – A hamlet northeast of Stanfordville. It is the location of Immaculate Conception Church. The Bangall Post Office was added to the National Register of Historic Places in 2014.
- Bear Market – A hamlet northwest of Stanfordville.
- Lenihan – A hamlet north of Stanfordville.
- McIntyre – A hamlet north of Stanfordville.
- Stanfordville – A hamlet in the southern half of the town, on Route 82. The Dr. Cornelius Nase Campbell House was added to the National Register of Historic Places in 2007.
- Stissing – A hamlet in the northeastern section of the town, southwest of Attlebury. The community was the site of the former Stissing Junction.
- Willow Brook – A hamlet southwest of Stanfordville.
