= List of SUNYAC Conference champions =

This article is a list of SUNYAC champions.

== Fall sports ==
=== Men's cross country ===
Year	Champion
2025	Cortland
2024	Cortland
2023	Geneseo
2022	Geneseo
2021	Geneseo
2019	Geneseo
2018	Geneseo
2017	Geneseo
2016	Geneseo
2015	Geneseo
2014	Geneseo
2013	Cortland
2012	Geneseo
2011	Geneseo
2010	Geneseo
2009	Geneseo
2008	Cortland
2007	Cortland
2006	Cortland
2005	Geneseo
2004	Geneseo
2003	Geneseo
2002	Geneseo
2001	Geneseo
2000	Geneseo
1999	Cortland
1998	Cortland
1997	Plattsburgh
1996	Cortland
1995	Plattsburgh
1994	Plattsburgh
1993	Geneseo
1992	Fredonia
1991	Cortland
1990	Cortland
1989	Cortland
1988	Fredonia
1987	Cortland
1986	Geneseo
1985	Cortland
1984	Albany
1983	Fredonia
1982	Fredonia
1981	Fredonia
1980	Fredonia
1979	Fredonia
1978	Fredonia
1977	Albany
1976	Brockport
1975	Plattsburgh
1974	Plattsburgh
1973	Albany
1972	Albany
1971	Albany
1970	Brockport
1969	Buffalo State
1968	Cortland
1967	Cortland
1966	Buffalo State
1965	Buffalo State
1964	Brockport
1963	Brockport

=== Women's cross country ===
Year	Champion
2025	Cortland
2024	Cortland
2023	Geneseo
2022	Geneseo
2021	Geneseo
2019	Geneseo
2018	Geneseo
2017	Geneseo
2016	Geneseo
2015	Geneseo
2014	Geneseo
2013	Geneseo
2012	Geneseo
2011	Geneseo
2010	Cortland
2009	Geneseo
2008	Geneseo
2007	Geneseo
2006	Geneseo
2005	Geneseo
2004	Geneseo
2003	Geneseo
2002	Geneseo
2001	Geneseo
2000	Geneseo
1999	Plattsburgh
1998	Cortland
1997	Cortland
1996	Cortland
1995	Cortland
1994	Cortland
1993	Cortland
1992	Cortland
1991	Cortland
1990	Cortland
1989	Cortland
1988	Cortland
1987	Cortland
1986	Cortland
1985	Cortland
1984	Cortland
1983	Binghamton

=== Field hockey ===
- The SUNYAC terminated field hockey after the 1986 season, and later reinstated it prior to the 2000 season

Year	Regular season	Record	Tournament
2025	Salisbury	5–0	Salisbury
2024	Cortland	4–0	Cortland
2023	Cortland	6–0	Cortland
2022	Geneseo	6–0	Cortland
2021	New Paltz	6–0	New Paltz
2019	Geneseo	6–0	Geneseo
2018	New Paltz	5–1	New Paltz
2017	Cortland	5–1	Cortland
2016	Cortland	6–0	Geneseo
2015	Cortland	7–0	New Paltz
2014	Cortland	6–0	New Paltz
2013	Cortland	6–0	New Paltz
2012	Geneseo	5–1	New Paltz
2012	New Paltz	5–1	New Paltz
2011	Cortland	6–0	Cortland
2010	Geneseo	6–0	Geneseo
2009	Cortland	6–0	
2008	Cortland	6–0	
2007	Cortland	6–0	
2006	Cortland	5–0	
2005	Cortland	5–0	
2004	Cortland	4–1	
2003	Cortland	5–0	
2002	Cortland	5–0	
2001	Cortland	5–0	
2000	Cortland	5–0	
1986	Cortland		
1985	Cortland		
1984	Cortland		

=== Men's soccer ===
Year	Regular season	Record	Tournament
2025	Cortland	7–0–2	Oneonta
2024	Buffalo State	7–1–1	Cortland
2023	Cortland	7–1–1	Cortland
2022	Cortland	6–1–2	Oneonta
2021	Cortland	8–1	Cortland
2019	Oneonta	8–1	Oneonta
2018	Cortland	8–1	Brockport
2017	Cortland	8–1	Oneonta
2016	Cortland	8–1	Cortland
2015	Oneonta	8–1	Oneonta
2014	Oneonta	8–0–1	Oneonta
2013	Oneonta	7–0–2	Plattsburgh
2012	Oneonta; Plattsburgh	7–2	Oneonta
2011	Oneonta	8–0–1	Oneonta
2010	Oneonta	7–2–0	Plattsburgh
2009	Plattsburgh	7–1–1	Brockport
2008	Geneseo	9–0–1	Cortland
2007	Oneonta	11–0–0	Fredonia
2006	Geneseo	8–1–0	Geneseo
2005	Plattsburgh	8–1–0	Plattsburgh
2004	Plattsburgh	6–1–2	Geneseo
2003	Plattsburgh	9–0–0	Cortland
2002	Brockport	9–0–0	Cortland
2001	Plattsburgh	8–1–0	Cortland
2000	Fredonia	9–0–0	Plattsburgh
1999	?	?–?–?	Plattsburgh
1998	?	?–?–?	Fredonia
1998	?	?–?–?	Plattsburgh
1997	?	?–?–?	Fredonia
1996	?	?–?–?	Fredonia
1995	?	?–?–?	Fredonia
1994	?	?–?–?	Plattsburgh
1993	?	?–?–?	Cortland
1992	?	?–?–?	Plattsburgh
1991	?	?–?–?	Cortland
1990	?	?–?–?	Cortland
1989	?	?–?–?	Binghamton
1988	?	?–?–?	Binghamton
1987	?	?–?–?	Binghamton; Fredonia
1986	?	?–?–?	Fredonia
1985	?	?–?–?	Oneonta
1984	?	?–?–?	Fredonia
1983	?	?–?–?	Cortland
1982	?	?–?–?	Binghamton
1981	?	?–?–?	Cortland
1980	?	?–?–?	Binghamton
1979	?	?–?–?	Cortland
1978	?	?–?–?	Brockport
1977	?	?–?–?	Cortland
1976	?	?–?–?	Brockport
1975	?	?–?–?	Oneonta
1974	?	?–?–?	Binghamton
1973	?	?–?–?	Brockport; Oneonta
1972	?	?–?–?	Brockport; Cortland; Oneonta
1971	?	?–?–?	Brockport; Oneonta
1970	?	?–?–?	Brockport; Buffalo State
1969	?	?–?–?	Brockport
1968	?	?–?–?	Brockport
1967	?	?–?–?	Buffalo State
1966	?	?–?–?	Oswego
1965	?	?–?–?	New Paltz
1964	?	?–?–?	Cortland
1963	?	?–?–?	Cortland
1962	?	?–?–?	Cortland
1961	?	?–?–?	Brockport
1960	?	?–?–?	Cortland
1959	?	?–?–?	Cortland

=== Women's soccer ===
Year	Regular season	Record	Tournament
2025	Cortland	8–0–1	Cortland
2024	New Paltz	8–0–1	New Paltz
2023	Cortland	5–0–4	Cortland
2022	Cortland	8–0–1	Geneseo
2021	Geneseo	8–0–1	Geneseo
2019	Geneseo	8–0–1	Cortland
2018	Geneseo	8–1	Geneseo
2017	Geneseo	8–1	Geneseo
2016	Buffalo State	9–0	Buffalo State
2015	Oneonta	7–1–1	Oneonta
2015	Buffalo State	7–1–1	Oneonta
2014	Geneseo	7–1–1	Geneseo
2013	Oneonta	6–0–3	Oneonta
2012	Brockport	7–1–1	Cortland
2011	Cortland	8–1–0	New Paltz
2010	Oneonta	7–1–1	Oneonta
2009	Oneonta	7–2–0	Geneseo
2008	Oneonta	9–1–0	Oneonta
2007	Oneonta	9–1–1	Oneonta
2006	Oneonta	10–0–0	Brockport
2005	Oneonta	10–0–0	Oneonta
2004	Oneonta	10–0–0	Oneonta
2003	Oneonta	9–0–1	Oneonta
2002	Oneonta	10–0–0	Oneonta
2001	Oneonta	10–0–0	Oneonta
2000	Oneonta	10–0–0	Oneonta
1999	?	?–?–?	Oneonta
1998	?	?–?–?	Plattsburgh
1997	?	?–?–?	Oneonta
1996	?	?–?–?	Binghamton
1995	?	?–?–?	Binghamton
1994	?	?–?–?	Geneseo
1993	?	?–?–?	Geneseo
1992	?	?–?–?	Binghamton; Geneseo
1991	?	?–?–?	Cortland
1990	?	?–?–?	Cortland
1989	?	?–?–?	Cortland
1988	?	?–?–?	Cortland
1987	?	?–?–?	Geneseo
1986	?	?–?–?	Cortland
1985	?	?–?–?	Cortland
1984	?	?–?–?	Cortland
1983	?	?–?–?	Brockport

=== Women's tennis ===
Year	Champion
Fall 2025	New Paltz
Spring 2025	New Paltz
2024	New Paltz
2023	New Paltz
2022	Oneonta
2021	New Paltz
2019	New Paltz
2018	New Paltz
2017	Geneseo
2016	Geneseo
2015	Geneseo
2014	Geneseo
2013	Geneseo
2012	Geneseo
2011	Geneseo
2010	New Paltz
2009	Geneseo
2008	Geneseo
2007	New Paltz
2006	New Paltz
2005	Cortland
2004	Cortland
2003	Cortland
2002	New Paltz
2001	Geneseo
2000	Cortland
1999	Cortland
1998	Geneseo
1997	Cortland
1996	Binghamton
1995	Binghamton
1994	Binghamton
1993	Binghamton
1992	Binghamton
1991	Binghamton
1990	Binghamton
1989	Binghamton
1988	Binghamton
1987	Binghamton
1986	Cortland
1985	Binghamton
1984	Binghamton

=== Volleyball ===
- The SUNYAC Conference uses a two divisional format, both East (E) and West (W) division regular season champions are named along with their correlating records

Year	Regular season	Record	Tournament
2025	Cortland	9–0	Cortland
2024	Cortland	9–0	Cortland
2023	Cortland	9–0	Cortland
2022	Cortland	9–0	Cortland
2021	Cortland	9–0	Cortland
2019	Geneseo	9–0	Brockport
2018	Geneseo	9–0	New Palz
2017	Brockport	9–0	Brockport
2016	Brockport	9–0	Brockport
2015	Brockport	9–0	Brockport
2014	New Paltz	9–0	New Paltz
2013	New Paltz	9–0	Buffalo State
2012	Cortland (E); Buffalo State (W)	7–1; 6–0	Cortland
2011	Cortland (E); Fredonia (W)	8–0; 7–1	Cortland
2010	Cortland (E); Fredonia (W)	7–1; 8–0	Cortland
2009	New Paltz (E); Fredonia (W)	7–1; 7–1	New Paltz
2008	New Paltz (E); Fredonia (W)	7–1; 10–0	Fredonia
2007	Cortland (E); Fredonia (W)	10–0; 9–1	Cortland
2006	New Paltz (E); Brockport (W)	9–1; 8–0	Cortland
2005	Cortland (E); Brockport (W)	9–1; 7–1	Cortland
2004	Cortland (E); Brockport (W)	9–1; 7–1	Cortland
2003	Cortland (E); Fredonia (W)	10–0; 8–0	Cortland
2002	Oneonta (E); Brockport (W)	9–1; 7–1	Oneonta
2001	Oneonta (E); Brockport (W)	10–1; 7–1	Oneonta
2000	Oneonta (E); Brockport (W)	10–0; 8–0	Cortland
1999		?–?	Cortland
1998		?–?	Cortland
1997		?–?	Cortland
1996		?–?	Cortland
1995		?–?	Binghamton
1994		?–?	Brockport
1993		?–?	Brockport
1992		?–?	Brockport
1991		?–?	Brockport
1990		?–?	Brockport
1989		?–?	Cortland
1988		?–?	Cortland
1987		?–?	Cortland
1986		?–?	Cortland
1985		?–?	Cortland
1984		?–?	Albany

== Winter sports ==
=== Men's basketball ===
Year	Regular season	Record	Tournament
2024–25	New Paltz	14–4	Cortland
2023–24	Oswego	18–0	New Paltz
2022–23	Oswego	17–1	Oswego
2021–22	Oswego	17–1	Oswego
2019–20	Brockport	17–1	Brockport
2018–19	Oswego	15–3	Oswego
2017–18	Plattsburgh	17–1	Plattsburgh
2016–17	Oswego	15–3	Oswego
2015–16	Plattsburgh	16–2	Cortland
2014–15	Plattsburgh	13–5	Oswego
2013–14	Brockport	16–2	Brockport
2012–13	Cortland	15–3	Cortland
2011–12	Oswego	18–0	Oswego
2010–11	Oswego	17–1	Buffalo State
2009–10	Plattsburgh	13–5	Plattsburgh
2008–09	Geneseo	11–5	Brockport
2007–08	Plattsburgh (E); Brockport (W)	16–0; 14–2	Plattsburgh
2006–07	Brockport	14–2	Plattsburgh
2005–06	Cortland	14–2	Plattsburgh
2004–05	Potsdam	13–3	Potsdam
2003–04	Brockport	15–1	Potsdam
2002–03	Potsdam	12–4	Buffalo State
2001–02	Brockport	14–2	Brockport
2000–01	Cortland	16–4	Brockport
1999–2000		?–?	Cortland
1998–99		?–?	Geneseo
1997–98		?–?	Geneseo
1996–97		?–?	Buffalo State
1995–96		?–?	Buffalo State
1994–95		?–?	Buffalo State
1993–94		?–?	Brockport
1992–93		?–?	Fredonia
1991–92		?–?	Buffalo State
1990–91		?–?	Buffalo State
1989–90		?–?	Buffalo State
1988–89		?–?	Buffalo State
1987–88		?–?	Buffalo State
1986–87		?–?	Potsdam
1985–86		?–?	Potsdam
1984–85		?–?	Buffalo State
1983–84		?–?	Buffalo State
1982–83		?–?	Potsdam
1981–82		?–?	Buffalo
1980–81		?–?	Albany
1979–80		?–?	Potsdam
1978–79		?–?	Albany; Plattsburgh; Potsdam
1977–78		?–?	Potsdam
1976–77		?–?	Albany; Potsdam
1975–76		?–?	Plattsburgh
1974–75		?–?	Brockport
1973–74		?–?	Brockport; Potsdam
1972–73		?–?	Brockport
1971–72		?–?	Buffalo State
1970–71		?–?	Buffalo State
1969–70		?–?	Buffalo State
1968–69		?–?	Buffalo State; Cortland
1967–68		?–?	Buffalo State
1966–67		?–?	Buffalo State
1965–66		?–?	Potsdam
1964–65		?–?	Oswego
1963–64		?–?	Oswego
1992–63		?–?	Potsdam
1961–63		?–?	Oswego
1960–61		?–?	Cortland
1959–60		?–?	Oswego
1958–59		?–?	Cortland

=== Women's basketball ===
Year	Regular season	Record	Tournament
2024–25	Cortland	17–1	Cortland
2023–24	New Palz	17–1	New Paltz
2022–23	New Palz	18–0	Cortland
2021–22	Cortland	16–2	New Paltz
2019–20	New Paltz	17–1	New Paltz
2018–19	New Paltz	17–1	New Paltz
2017–18	Geneseo	18–0	Geneseo
2016–17	Geneseo	18–0	New Paltz
2015–16	New Paltz	14–4	New Paltz
2014–15	Geneseo	17–1	Geneseo
2013–14	Plattsburgh	15–3	Plattsburgh
2012–13	New Paltz	16–2	New Paltz
2011–12	Buffalo State	16–2	Oneonta
2010–11	Geneseo	17–1	Geneseo
2009–10	Cortland	17–1	Cortland
2008–09	Cortland	15–1	Brockport
2007–08	Cortland (E); Brockport (W)	12–4; 14–2	Brockport
2006–07	Cortland	15–1	Cortland
2005–06	Cortland	15–1	Oswego
2004–05	Oswego	14–2	Brockport
2003–04	Cortland	14–2	Cortland
2002–03	Geneseo	15–1	Brockport
2001–02	Buffalo State	15–1	Buffalo State
2000–01	Oneonta	19–1	Oneonta
1999–2000		?–?	Cortland
1998–99		?–?	Cortland
1997–98		?–?	Oneonta
1996–97		?–?	Binghamton
1995–96		?–?	Geneseo
1994–95		?–?	Geneseo
1993–94		?–?	Buffalo State
1992–93		?–?	Geneseo
1991–92		?–?	Cortland
1990–91		?–?	Buffalo State
1989–90		?–?	Buffalo State
1988–89		?–?	Cortland
1987–88		?–?	Buffalo State
1986–87		?–?	Buffalo State
1985–86		?–?	Buffalo State
1984–85		?–?	Buffalo State
1983–84		?–?	Buffalo State

=== Men's ice hockey ===
Year	Regular season	Record	Tournament
2024–25	Oswego	10–1	Oswego
2023–24	Geneseo	14–2	Cortland
2022–23	Oswego	12–4	Plattsburgh
2021–22	Geneseo	12–2–1	Geneseo
2019–20	Geneseo	13–1–2	Geneseo
2018–19	Geneseo	15–1–2	Geneseo
2017–18	Oswego	13–2–1	Geneseo
2016–17	Oswego	13–2–1	Plattsburgh
2015–16	Plattsburgh	12–1–3	Geneseo
2014–15	Plattsburgh	13–2–1	Plattsburgh
2013–14	Geneseo	14–2–0	Oswego
2012–13	Oswego	14–2–0	Oswego
2011–12	Oswego	14–0–2	Plattsburgh
2010–11	Oswego	15–1–0	Plattsburgh
2009–10	Oswego	15–1–0	Oswego
2008–09	Oswego	15–1–0	Plattsburgh
2007–08	Plattsburgh	14–2–0	Plattsburgh
2006–07	Oswego	11–1–2	Fredonia
2005–06	Oswego	10–3–1	Geneseo
2004–05	Oswego	11–3–0	Geneseo
2003–04	Plattsburgh	12–0–2	Plattsburgh
2002–03	Oswego	10–3–1	Oswego
2001–02	Plattsburgh	13–1–0	Plattsburgh
2000–01	Plattsburgh	13–1–0	Plattsburgh
1999–2000		?–?–?	Plattsburgh
1998–99		?–?–?	Plattsburgh
1997–98		?–?–?	Plattsburgh
1996–97		?–?–?	Plattsburgh
1995–96		?–?–?	Potsdam
1994–95		?–?–?	Fredonia
1993–94		?–?–?	Fredonia
1992–93		?–?–?	Plattsburgh
1991–92		?–?–?	Plattsburgh
1990–91		?–?–?	Oswego
1989–90		?–?–?	Plattsburgh
1988–89		?–?–?	Oswego
1987–88		?–?–?	Plattsburgh
1986–87		?–?–?	Plattsburgh
1985–86		?–?–?	Geneseo
1984–85		?–?–?	Plattsburgh
1983–84		?–?–?	Oswego
1982–83		?–?–?	Plattsburgh
1981–82		?–?–?	Oswego; Plattsburgh
1980–81		?–?–?	Oswego
1979–80		?–?–?	Oswego
1978–79		?–?–?	Plattsburgh
1977–78		?–?–?	Plattsburgh

=== Women's ice hockey ===
Year	Regular season	Record	Tournament
2024–25	Oswego	15–1–2	Plattsburgh
2023–24	Plattsburgh	16–2	Cortland

=== Men's swimming and diving ===
Year	Champion
2023–24	Cortland
2023–24	Geneseo
2022–23	Geneseo
2021–22	Geneseo
2019–20	Geneseo
2018–19	Geneseo
2017–18	Geneseo
2016–17	Geneseo
2015–16	Geneseo
2014–15	Geneseo
2013–14	Geneseo
2012–13	Geneseo
2011–12	Geneseo
2010–11	Geneseo
2009–10	Geneseo
2008–09	Geneseo
2007–08	Geneseo
2006–07	Geneseo
2005–06	Geneseo
2004–05	Geneseo
2003–04	Geneseo
2002–03	Geneseo
2001–02	Geneseo
2000–01	Geneseo
1999–2000	Geneseo
1998–99	Geneseo
1997–98	Cortland
1996–97	Geneseo
1995–96	Binghamton
1994–95	Geneseo
1993–94	Binghamton
1992–93	Cortland
1991–92	Geneseo
1990–91	Geneseo
1989–90	Geneseo
1988–89	New Paltz
1987–88	Fredonia
1986–87	Buffalo
1985–86	New Paltz
1984–85	Cortland
1983–84	Fredonia
1982–83	Potsdam
1981–82	Potsdam
1980–81	Cortland
1979–80	Cortland
1978–79	Cortland
1977–78	Potsdam
1976–77	Potsdam
1975–76	Geneseo
1974–75	Buffalo State
1973–74	Buffalo State
1972–73	Buffalo State
1971–72	Buffalo State
1970–71	Buffalo State
1969–70	Oneonta
1968–69	Oneonta
1967–68	Oneonta
1966–67	Oneonta
1965–66	Brockport
1964–65	Oneonta
1963–64	Brockport
1962–63	Brockport

=== Women's swimming and diving ===
Year	Champion
2024–25	Cortland
2023–24	Geneseo
2022–23	Geneseo
2021–22	Geneseo
2019–20	Geneseo
2018–19	Geneseo
2017–18	Geneseo
2016–17	Geneseo
2015–16	Geneseo
2014–15	Geneseo
2013–14	Geneseo
2012–13	Geneseo
2011–12	Geneseo
2010–11	Geneseo
2009–10	Geneseo
2008–09	Geneseo
2007–08	Geneseo
2006–07	Oswego
2005–06	Oswego
2004–05	Oswego
2003–04	Geneseo
2002–03	Geneseo
2001–02	Geneseo
2000–01	Geneseo
1999–2000	Geneseo
1998–99	Geneseo
1997–98	Geneseo
1996–97	Geneseo
1995–96	Geneseo
1994–95	Geneseo
1993–94	Geneseo
1992–93	Geneseo
1991–92	Geneseo
1990–91	Geneseo
1989–90	Geneseo
1988–89	Cortland
1987–88	Cortland
1986–87	Buffalo
1985–86	Cortland
1984–85	Cortland
1983–84	Potsdam

=== Men's indoor track and field ===
Year	Champion
2024–25	Cortland
2023–24	Geneseo
2022–23	Geneseo
2021–22	Geneseo
2019–20	Geneseo
2018–19	Geneseo
2017–18	Geneseo
2016–17	Geneseo
2015–16	Cortland
2014–15	Oneonta
2013–14	Buffalo State
2012–13	Oneonta
2011–12	Geneseo
2010–11	Buffalo State
2009–10	Geneseo
2008–09	Cortland
2007–08	Cortland
2006–07	Cortland
2005–06	Geneseo
2004–05	Geneseo
2003–04	Cortland
2002–03	Geneseo
2001–02	Geneseo
2000–01	Geneseo
1999–2000	Fredonia
1998–99	Cortland
1997–98	Fredonia
1996–97	Fredonia
1995–96	Fredonia
1994–95	Fredonia
1993–94	Fredonia
1992–93	Fredonia
1991–92	Fredonia
1990–91	Fredonia
1989–90	Fredonia
1988–89	Fredonia
1987–88	Brockport
1986–87	Fredonia
1985–86	Fredonia
1984–85	Fredonia
1983–84	Fredonia
1982–83	Fredonia
1981–82	Cortland
1980–81	Fredonia

=== Women's indoor track and field ===
Year	Champion
2024–25	Cortland
2023–24	Geneseo
2022–23	Geneseo
2021–22	Geneseo
2019–20	Geneseo
2018–19	Geneseo
2017–18	Geneseo
2016–17	Geneseo
2015–16	Oneonta
2014–15	Buffalo State
2013–14	Cortland
2012–13	Cortland
2011–12	Cortland
2010–11	Buffalo State
2009–10	Buffalo State
2008–09	Buffalo State
2007–08	Cortland
2006–07	Cortland
2005–06	Geneseo
2004–05	Geneseo
2003–04	Geneseo
2002–03	Geneseo
2001–02	Cortland
2000–01	Cortland
1999–2000	Cortland
1998–99	Cortland
1997–98	Cortland
1996–97	Cortland
1995–96	Geneseo
1994–95	Fredonia
1993–94	Geneseo
1992–93	Cortland
1991–92	Cortland
1990–91	Cortland
1989–90	Cortland
1988–89	Cortland
1987–88	Fredonia
1986–87	Buffalo
1985–86	Cortland
1984–85	Cortland
1983–84	Geneseo

=== Wrestling ===
Year	Champion
2025	Cortland & Oneonta
2024	Cortland
1990–91	Brockport
1989–90	Brockport
1988–89	Brockport
1987–88	Cortland
1986–87	Buffalo
1985–86	Brockport
1984–85	Brockport
1983–84	Brockport
1982–83	Brockport
1981–82	Brockport
1980–81	Brockport
1979–80	Brockport
1978–79	Cortland
1977–78	Brockport
1976–77	Brockport
1975–76	Brockport
1974–75	Brockport
1973–74	Brockport
1972–73	Potsdam
1971–72	Brockport
1970–71	Oswego
1969–70	Cortland
1968–69	Oswego
1967–68	Oswego
1966–67	Oswego
1965–66	Cortland
1964–65	Oswego
1963–64	Oswego
1962–63	Cortland
1961–62	Cortland
1960–61	Cortland

== Spring sports ==
=== Baseball ===
Year	Regular season	Record	Tournament
2025	Cortland	15–3	Cortland
2024	Cortland	16–2	New Paltz
2023	Cortland	16–2	Brockport
2022	Oswego	16–2	Cortland
2021	Cortland	14–2	Cortland
2019	Cortland	18–0	Oswego
2018	Cortland	15–2	Oswego
2017	Oswego	15–3	Oswego* (Cancelled)
2016	Cortland	14–4	Cortland
2015	Cortland	17–1	Cortland
2014	Cortland	15–3	Cortland
2013	Cortland	15–3	Cortland
2012	Cortland	16–2	Cortland
2011	Cortland	16–2	Cortland
2010	Cortland	11–1	Brockport
2009	Cortland	9–3	Cortland
2008	Cortland	14–0	Cortland
2007	Cortland	11–3	Cortland
2006	Cortland	12–2	Cortland
2005	Cortland	13–1	Cortland
2004	Cortland	13–1	Brockport
2003	Cortland	11–1	Cortland
2002	Cortland	12–0	Cortland
2001	Cortland	11–1	Cortland
2000		?–?	Cortland
1999		?–?	Cortland
1998		?–?	Cortland
1997		?–?	Cortland
1996		?–?	Oswego
1995		?–?	Cortland
1994		?–?	Cortland
1993		?–?	Cortland
1992		?–?	Cortland
1991		?–?	Cortland
1990		?–?	Fredonia
1989		?–?	Oswego
1988		?–?	Oswego
1987		?–?	Albany
1986		?–?	Oswego
1985		?–?	Oswego
1984		?–?	Oswego
1983		?–?	Cortland
1982		?–?	Oswego
1981		?–?	Cortland
1980		?–?	Buffalo
1979		?–?	Cortland
1978		?–?	Oneonta
1977		?–?	Cortland (Co–E); Oneonta (Co–E); Oswego (W)
1976		?–?	Cortland (E); Brockport (W)
1975		?–?	Brockport
1974		?–?	Oneonta
1973		?–?	Albany
1972		?–?	Brockport
1971		?–?	Oneonta
1970		?–?	Oneonta
1969		?–?	Oneonta
1968		?–?	Cortland
1967		?–?	Cortland
1966		?–?	Oswego
1965		?–?	Oswego
1964		?–?	Cortland
1963		?–?	Oswego
1962		?–?	Oswego
1961		?–?	Cortland
1960		?–?	Cortland

- 2017 SUNYAC Tournament cancelled due to weather and unplayable conditions making regular season champions SUNY Oswego the tournament champions

=== Men's golf ===
Year	Champion
1980	Buffalo
1979	Oswego
1978	Brockport
1977	Oswego
1976	Oswego
1975	Oswego
1974	Oswego
1973	Oswego
1972	Oswego
1971	Plattsburgh
1970	Oswego
1969	Oswego
1968	Oswego
1967	Oswego
1966	Cortland
1965	Oswego
1964	Plattsburgh
1963	Albany
1962	Cortland
1961	Cortland
1960	Cortland

=== Men's lacrosse ===
Year	Regular season	Record	Tournament
2025	Cortland	7–0	Cortland
2024	Cortland	7–0	Geneseo
2023	Geneseo	7–0	Geneseo
2022	Cortland	7–0	Cortland
2021	Cortland	5–1	Cortland
2019	Cortland	6–0	Cortland
2018	Cortland	5–1	Cortland
2017	Cortland	6–0	Plattsburgh
2016	Cortland	6–0	Cortland
2015	Cortland	6–0	Cortland
2014	Cortland	6–0	Cortland
2013	Cortland	6–0	Cortland
2012	Cortland	6–0	Cortland
2011	Cortland	6–0	Cortland
2010	Cortland	6–0	Cortland
2009	Cortland	6–0	Cortland
2008	Cortland	7–0	Cortland
2007	Geneseo	6–0	Geneseo
2006	Geneseo	6–0	Cortland
2005	Cortland	6–0	Cortland
2004	Cortland	6–0	Geneseo
2003	Cortland	7–0	Cortland
2002	Cortland	7–0	Cortland
2001	Cortland	6–0	Cortland
2000		?–?	Cortland
1987		?–?	Cortland
1986		?–?	Cortland
1985		?–?	Cortland
1984		?–?	Cortland
1983		?–?	Cortland
1982		?–?	Geneseo
1981		?–?	Cortland
1980		?–?	Cortland
1979		?–?	Cortland
1978		?–?	Cortland

=== Women's lacrosse ===
Year	Regular season	Record	Tournament
2025	Oswego	9–0	Oswego
2024	Cortland	9–0	Cortland
2023	Cortland	9–0	Geneseo
2022	Cortland	9–0	Cortland
2021	Cortland	8–0	Cortland
2019	Geneseo	9–0	Brockport
2018	Cortland	8–0	Cortland
2017	Brockport	8–0	Cortland
2016	Cortland	8–0	Cortland
2015	Cortland	8–0	Cortland
2014	Cortland	8–0	Cortland
2013	Cortland	8–0	Cortland
2012	Cortland	8–0	Cortland
2011	Cortland	8–0	Cortland
2010	Cortland	8–0	Cortland
2009	Buffalo State	9–0	Cortland
2008	Cortland	8–0	Cortland
2007	Cortland	7–0	Cortland
2006	Cortland	7–0	Cortland
2005	Geneseo	6–1	Cortland
2004	Cortland	7–0	Cortland
2003	Cortland	8–0	Cortland
2002	Cortland	8–0	Cortland
2001	Cortland	8–0	Cortland
2000		?–?	Cortland
1999		?–?	Cortland
1998		?–?	Oneonta
1997		?–?	Cortland

=== Softball ===
Year	Regular season	Record	Tournament
2025	Cortland	16–2	Cortland
2024	New Paltz	17–1	New Paltz
2023	New Paltz	16–2	Geneseo
2022	Geneseo	16–2	Geneseo
2021	Cortland	11–3	Geneseo
2019	Cortland	15–3	Cortland
2018	Geneseo	13–3	Geneseo
2017	Cortland	14–4	Cortland
2016	Cortland	18–1	Cortland
2015	Cortland	16–2	Cortland
2014	Oneonta	15–3	Oneonta
2013	Brockport	15–3	Cortland
2012	Cortland	17–1	Plattsburgh
2011	Cortland	17–0–1	Cortland
2010	Cortland	18–0	Cortland
2009	Cortland	19–1	Buffalo State
2008	Cortland	19–3	Cortland
2007	Cortland	20–0	Cortland
2006	Plattsburgh	19–1	Plattsburgh
2005	Cortland	16–2	Cortland
2004	Cortland	18–2	Oneonta
2003	Geneseo	17–1	Cortland
2002	Geneseo	19–1	Geneseo
2001	Oneonta	18–2	Oneonta
2000		?–?	Buffalo State
1999		?–?	Oneonta
1998		?–?	Cortland
1997		?–?	Brockport
1996		?–?	Buffalo State
1995		?–?	Binghamton
1994		?–?	Brockport
1993		?–?	Brockport
1992		?–?	Cortland
1991		?–?	Brockport
1990		?–?	Cortland
1989		?–?	Brockport
1988		?–?	Cortland
1987		?–?	Brockport
1986		?–?	Cortland
1985		?–?	Buffalo
1984		?–?	Buffalo State

=== Men's tennis ===
Year	Champion
1989	Binghamton
1988	Binghamton
1987	Buffalo
1986	Albany
1985	Albany
1984	Albany
1983	Albany
1982	Albany
1981	Albany
1980	Albany
1979	Binghamton
1978	Binghamton
1977	Oneonta
1976	Albany
1975	Albany
1974	Oneonta
1973	Oneonta
1972	Albany; Oneonta
1971	Oneonta
1970	Oneonta
1969	Oneonta
1968	Brockport
1967	Oneonta
1966	New Paltz
1965	New Paltz
1964	Cortland
1963	Buffalo State
1962	Cortland
1961	Cancelled
1960	New Paltz
1959	Cortland; New Paltz

=== Men's outdoor track and field ===
Year	Champion
2025	Cortland
2024	Geneseo
2023	Geneseo
2022	Geneseo
2021	Geneseo
2019	Geneseo
2018	Geneseo
2017	Cortland
2016	Cortland
2015	Brockport
2014	Oneonta
2013	Cortland
2012	Cortland
2011	Geneseo
2010	Geneseo
2009	Geneseo
2008	Cortland
2007	Cortland
2006	Geneseo
2005	Cortland
2004	Cortland
2003	Geneseo
2002	Cortland
2001	Cortland
2000	Fredonia
1999	Fredonia
1998	Fredonia
1997	Cortland
1996	Fredonia
1995	Fredonia
1994	Fredonia
1993	Fredonia
1992	Fredonia
1991	Fredonia
1990	Fredonia
1989	Fredonia
1988	Fredonia
1987	Fredonia
1986	Fredonia
1985	Fredonia
1984	Fredonia
1983	Fredonia
1982	Fredonia
1981	Fredonia
1980	Fredonia
1979	Fredonia
1978	Fredonia
1977	Fredonia
1976	Plattsburgh
1975	Cortland
1974	Brockport
1973	Brockport
1972	Brockport
1971	Cortland
1970	Cancelled
1969	Brockport
1968	Brockport
1967	Buffalo

=== Women's outdoor track and field ===
Year	Champion
2025	Cortland
2024	Geneseo
2023	Geneseo
2022	Geneseo
2021	Geneseo
2019	Geneseo
2018	Geneseo
2017	Geneseo
2016	Oneonta
2015	Geneseo
2014	Cortland
2013	Cortland
2012	Cortland
2011	Cortland
2010	Geneseo
2009	Brockport
2008	Geneseo
2007	Cortland
2006	Geneseo
2005	Geneseo
2004	Geneseo
2003	Geneseo
2002	Cortland
2001	Cortland
2000	Cortland
1999	Cortland
1998	Cortland
1997	Fredonia
1996	Geneseo
1995	Cortland
1994	Fredonia
1993	Cortland
1992	Cortland
1991	Binghamton
1990	Cortland
1989	Cortland
1988	Fredonia
1987	Albany
1986	Cortland
1985	Cortland
1984	Geneseo
