= Kennedy Ring =

American soccer player (born 2007)

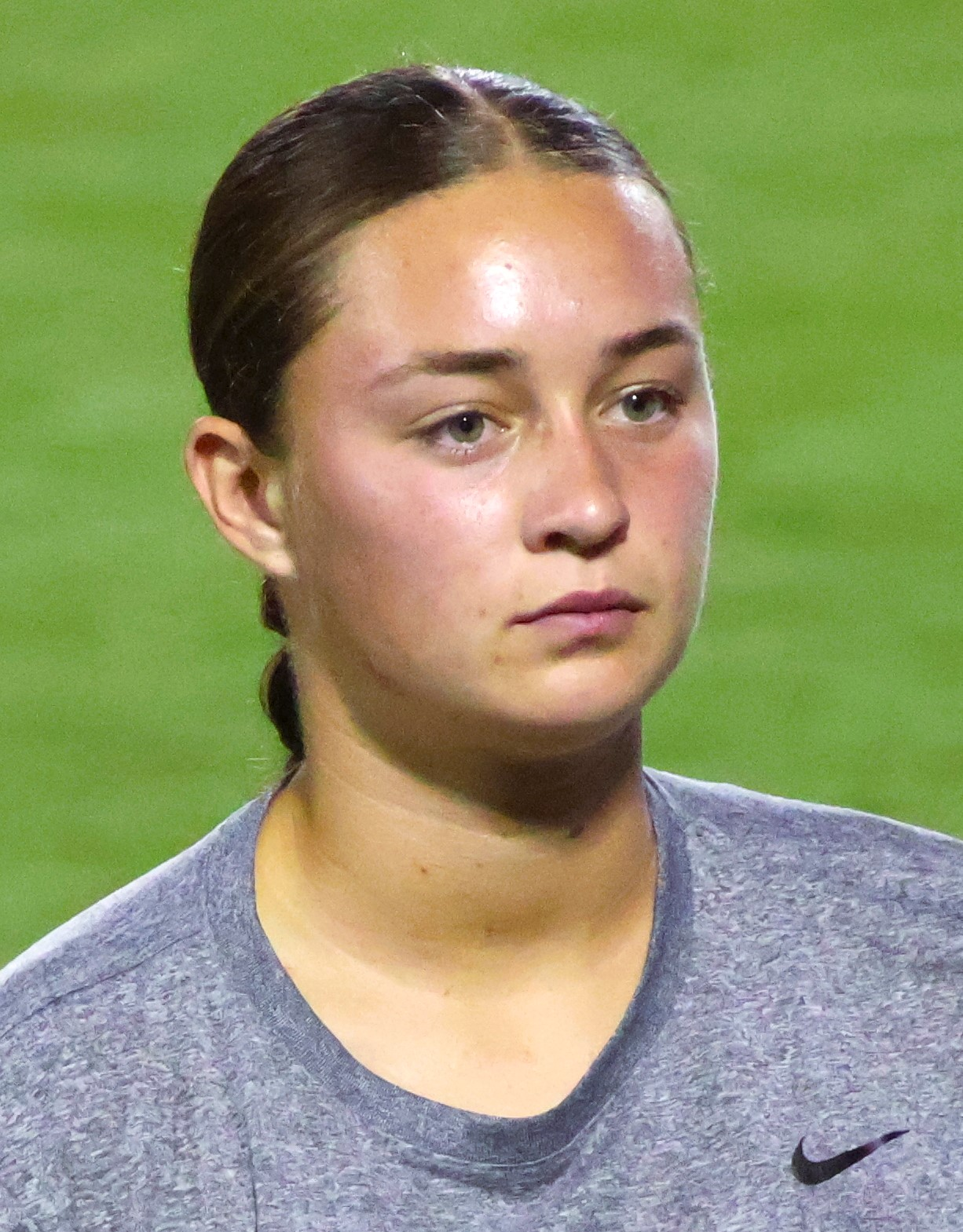
- Ring with Penn State in 2025

Personal information
- Full name: Kennedy Elizabeth Ring
- Date of birth: January 9, 2007 (age 19)
- Height: 5 ft 9 in (1.75 m)
- Position: Midfielder

Team information
- Current team: Penn State Nittany Lions
- Number: 24

College career
Years	Team	Apps	(Gls)
2025–	Penn State Nittany Lions	18	(0)

International career^{‡}
2026–	United States U-19	2	(0)
2025–	United States U-20	3	(0)
- ‡ National team caps and goals as of 00:04, September 12, 2026 (UTC)

Kennedy Elizabeth Ring (born January 9, 2007) is an American college soccer player who plays as a midfielder for the Penn State Nittany Lions.

== Early life ==
Ring grew up in the Albany suburb of East Greenbush, New York. She began playing soccer with Greenbush SC when she was four. She later moved to World Class FC, earning ECNL All-American and conference player of the year honors twice. She joined the varsity team at Columbia High School in eighth grade, scoring 50 goals with 32 assists over five seasons and being named United Soccer Coaches All-American twice. In her senior year in 2024, she led the team to the Class AA state title game, and its third consecutive sectional crown, and was named the Class AA player of the year and the New York Gatorade Player of the Year. She committed to Penn State before her junior year over offers from Pittsburgh and Virginia. After graduating one semester early, she trained with the Orlando Pride in the spring of 2025.

== College career ==
Ring made 18 appearances as a substitute for the Penn State Nittany Lions as a freshman in 2025.

== International career ==
Ring was called into training camps with the United States under-17 team in 2024 and the under-18 team in 2025. She made her under-20 debut at the 2025 CONCACAF Women's U-20 Championship, playing in three games with two starts as the United States qualified for the 2026 FIFA U-20 Women's World Cup.

== Personal life ==
Ring is the younger of two daughters born to Kathleen and Jeremy Ring. Her parents played soccer and lacrosse respectively at Keuka College, and her sister, Kaiden, plays soccer at SUNY Oneonta.
