= Jason Dellaero =

American baseball player (born 1976)

- Shortstop
- Born: December 17, 1976 (age 49); Mount Kisco, New York, U.S.
- Batted: Both Threw: Right

MLB debut
- September 7, 1999, for the Chicago White Sox

Last MLB appearance
- October 3, 1999, for the Chicago White Sox

MLB statistics
- Batting average: .091
- Home runs: 0
- Runs batted in: 2
- Stats at Baseball Reference

Teams
- Chicago White Sox (1999)

Jason Christopher Dellaero (born December 17, 1976) is an American former shortstop in Major League Baseball. He played for the Chicago White Sox in 1999.

Dellaero was drafted by the New York Mets in the 17th round of the 1994 Major League Baseball draft out of Brewster High School in Brewster, New York but did not sign because the Mets wanted him to pitch. He instead played college baseball at St. John's where he hit .323 as a freshman before transferring to South Florida where he played two years. In 1996, he played collegiate summer baseball with the Orleans Cardinals of the Cape Cod Baseball League. In 1997, he hit .324 with 20 home runs at South Florida. The White Sox selected him 15th overall in the 1997 Major League Baseball draft.

Dellaero made his major league debut on September 7, 1999 against the Anaheim Angels. In eleven games that season, he managed only three hits in 35 plate appearances. Dellaero struggled in subsequent seasons in the minors despite several adjustments including batting exclusively from the right side of the plate and visiting a sports psychologist. In 2002, the White Sox tried using Dellaero as a pitcher; he put up an earned run average of 8.47 in 17 minor league innings. His last season of affiliated baseball came in 2003 and was followed by parts of three seasons in the independent Atlantic League and Golden Baseball League.
