= Peach Lake, New York =

- CDP
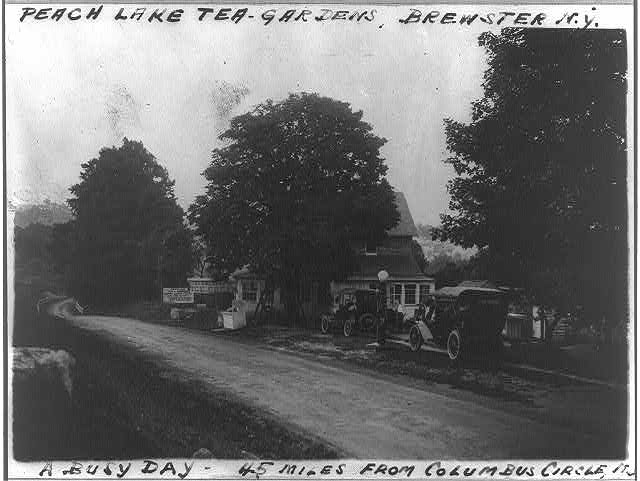
- Peach Lake Tea Gardens c. 1921

- Location in Putnam County and the state of New York.

- Location in Westchester County and the state of New York.
- Coordinates: 41°21′49″N 73°34′28″W
- Country: United States
- State: New York
- Counties: Putnam, Westchester
- Towns: Southeast, North Salem

Area
  - Total: 2.68 sq mi (6.95 km^{2})
  - Land: 2.30 sq mi (5.96 km^{2})
  - Water: 0.38 sq mi (0.98 km^{2})
- Elevation: 561 ft (171 m)

Population (2020)
  - Total: 1,885
  - Density: 818.6/sq mi (316.05/km^{2})
- Time zone: UTC-5 (Eastern (EST))
  - Summer (DST): UTC-4 (EDT)
- FIPS code: 36-56869
- GNIS feature ID: 1867413

Peach Lake is a hamlet (and census-designated place) located mostly in the town of Southeast in Putnam County, New York, United States; a portion of the CDP is in the town of North Salem in Westchester County. As of the 2020 census, Peach Lake had a population of 1,885.

The community of Peach Lake is located on the northeastern side of a lake with the same name. The lake itself is in two counties. The community is south of Interstate 84.

== Communities ==
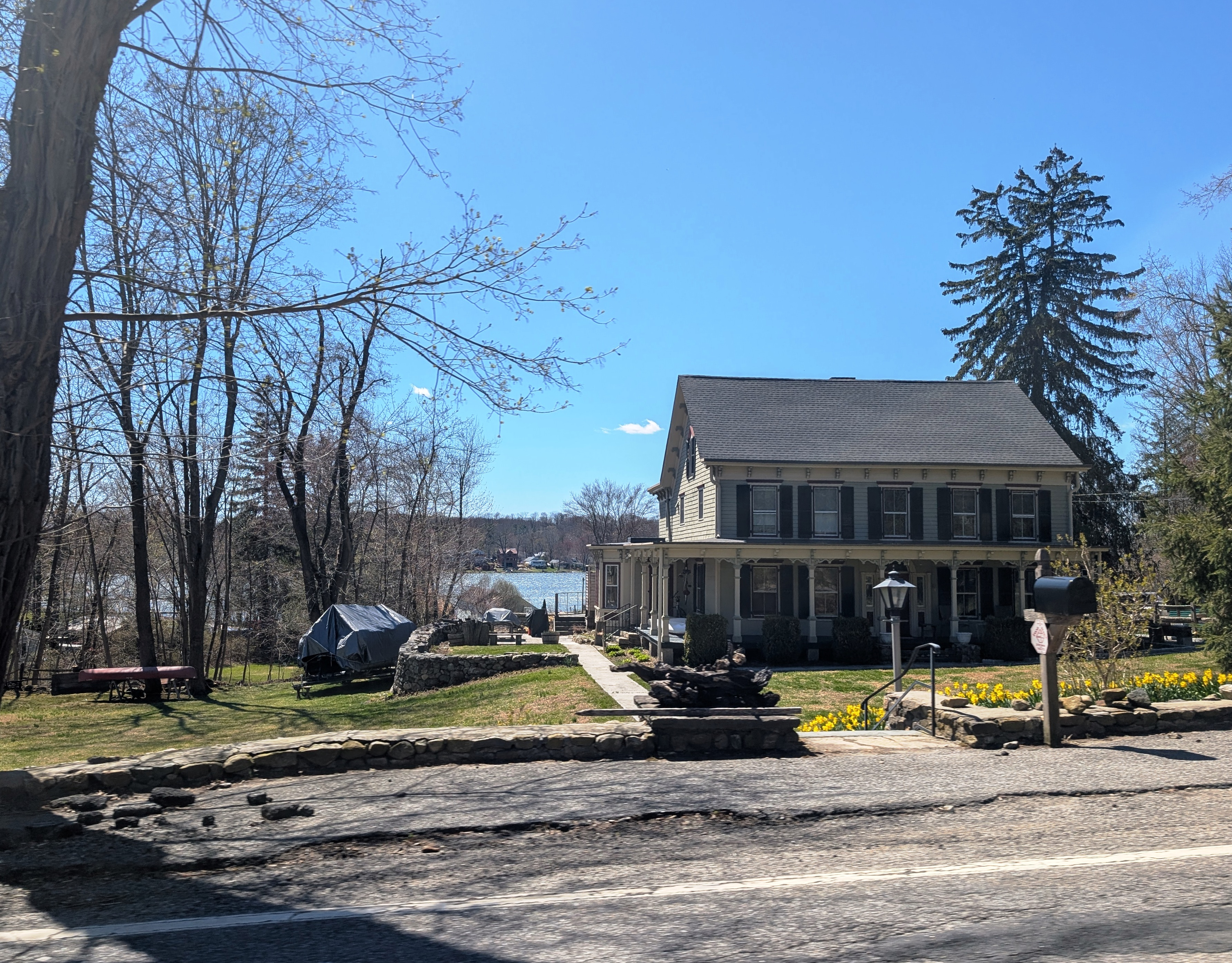
House and part of the lake as seen from NY 121

There are five communities that surround Peach Lake; one farm, three cooperatives and two home owner associations. Starting on the northern shore of the lake is Ryder Farm, which is an organic farm still owned by the original family from the 1700s. The large area of Peach Lake shoreline they own is the way it was hundreds of years ago. Going clockwise around the lake is Starr Ridge Manor 98 homes (only several on the lake), Vail's Grove Cooperative 176 homes, Pietsch Gardens Cooperative 95 homes, Northern Westchester County Club (NWCC) aka "Hotel Property" 85 homes and Bloomerside Cooperative 100 homes.

== Peach Lake water quality ==
Working with the homeowner associations and cooperatives around the lake and with support from the Peach Lake Environmental Coalition, officials of the towns of Southeast and North Salem worked to improve water quality in the lake specifically targeting the reduction of phosphorus loading. To improve the lake's water quality the following items were finished between 2012 and 2019:

- personnel from North Salem and Southeast worked with those in other government agencies to fund a $31,500,000 sewer project to provide sewers to homes around the lake. The distribution system and the sewer plant on the north end of Peach Lake was finished and all 484 homes and businesses hooked up by the spring of 2013.
- In 2016 the North Salem officials secured a $815,000 grant from the NYS DEC, and the East of Hudson Watershed Corporation installed 8 Contech "Jellyfish" catch basins around the lake to remove additional phosphorus.
- In the April of 2019, as part of the NYS HAB focus, Peach Lake became one of two lakes in the state to be part of a study using alum (aluminum sulfate) to lock the existing phosphorus into the sediment to further limit phosphorus loading in the lake.
- Continuing education of the residences is an ongoing project.

== History ==
Peach Lake is located in two towns, North Salem and Southeast, and two counties, Westchester and Putnam. Originally surrounded by farming families, the Bloomer and Palmer families lived on the western side, the Ryder family lived on the northwest side, and to the east were the Vail family.

Prior to 1731, the eastern edge of the Bloomer farm was the border of Connecticut. The area from there to the current state border was given to New York as part of the OBLONG, EQUIVALENCY or Connecticut's Panhandle agreement.

The area was a strong dairy community from the 1850s through 1915, when the Borden Condensed Milk factory was in production in Brewster. By 1915, the factory closed after New York City condemned much of the property along the rivers and lakes in the area to protect the water quality flowing into the newly created Croton Reservoir system.

The Bloomer family, originally from Rye, New York, started farming the property on the west side of the lake prior to 1760. In 1762 they purchased the land and built, along with the Palmer family, the Peach Lake Meeting House (Quaker Meeting house) at the southeastern corner of the Lake. This Peach Lake meeting house, like many others, starting at Long Island Sound and heading north, was built in the disputed area between the Connecticut and New York colonies called the Oblong.

The Vail family ran the dairy farm on the eastern side of the lake.

The Ryder family, who have for generations controlled the Putnam County National Bank, have farmed land on the northwest side of Peach Lake since the 18th century.

North Salem was part of the tribal land of a Wappinger Indian band known as the Kitawonks (or Kitchawanks), who laid claim to all the lands bordering the Kitchewan or Croton River that separates North Salem from present-day Somers. Although the name of the lake is Peach Lake, there was no peach orchards in the surrounding area. During the 1600s and 1700s, the lake was called Lake Pehquenakonck. Dutch documents, such as Van der Donck’s 1656 History of New Netherland, mention the area. Other maps from Dutch archives, circa 1685, show the "Indian Tribes of the New World" and locations of Indian villages, include Lake Pehquenakonck. The area was later named as Peach Pond, derived from the Indian word Pech-Quen. By the mid-1800s, the name was changed again, to Peach Lake.

The bulk of North Salem's residential properties are made up of 1,900 single-family homes - some from the 18th and 19th centuries.

== Geography ==
Peach Lake is located at 41°21′49″N 73°34′28″W (41.363521, -73.574454).

According to the United States Census Bureau, the CDP has a total area of 3.1 square miles (8.0 km^{2}), of which 2.7 square miles (7.0 km^{2}) is land and 0.4 square miles (1.0 km^{2}), or 11.76%, is water.

=== The Lake ===
Spring fed Peach Lake is located in the towns of North Salem and Southeast. The lake is 1.5 miles (2.4 km) long, 0.5 miles (0.80 km) wide at its center, and reaches a maximum depth of approximately 24 feet (7.3 m). Its western side is deeper than the eastern, unequally scalloped by glacial gouging. A sharp thermocline is present at a depth of about 11 to 13 feet (3.4 to 4.0 m) where the water temperature may change 15 °F (−9 °C) within an inch. This thermocline protects the lake from excessive weed growth in areas of the lake that are deeper than the thermocline layer, as it is simply too cold for the weeds to start growing. This temperature gradient is caused by the natural springs that feed the lake. There are no rivers entering the lake and only a very small intermittent stream on the southeastern corner.

The lake is a Class B reservoir for the New York City water supply system and, unusually for the area, outflows north through Peach Lake Brook into the East Branch Reservoir in the town of Southeast, which is part of the Croton Reservoir system.

== Demographics ==
Historical population
Census	Pop.	Note	%±
2020	1,885		—
U.S. Decennial Census

As of the census of 2000, there were 1,671 people, 617 households, and 468 families residing in the CDP. The population density was 619.2 inhabitants per square mile (239.1/km^{2}). There were 743 housing units at an average density of 275.3 per square mile (106.3/km^{2}). The racial makeup of the CDP was 97.19% White, 0.54% African American, 0.12% Native American, 0.78% Asian, 0.42% from other races, and 0.96% from two or more races. Hispanic or Latino of any race were 2.63% of the population.

There were 617 households, out of which 37.4% had children under the age of 18 living with them, 64.0% were married couples living together, 9.4% had a female householder with no husband present, and 24.1% were non-families. 20.7% of all households were made up of individuals, and 7.1% had someone living alone who was 65 years of age or older. The average household size was 2.71 and the average family size was 3.16.

In the CDP, the population was spread out, with 27.6% under the age of 18, 4.5% from 18 to 24, 27.8% from 25 to 44, 26.6% from 45 to 64, and 13.5% who were 65 years of age or older. The median age was 40 years. For every 100 females, there were 100.4 males. For every 100 females age 18 and over, there were 94.8 males.

The median income for a household in the CDP was $72,222, and the median income for a family was $82,222. Males had a median income of $55,529 versus $39,479 for females. The per capita income for the CDP was $33,340. None of the families was below the poverty line.

== Education ==
The Peach Lake census-designated place in Putnam County is divided between the North Salem Central School District and the Brewster Central School District. All of the Peach Lake census-designated place in Westchester County is in the North Salem Central School District.
