= Walter Brewster House =

Historic house in New York, United States

- U.S. National Register of Historic Places
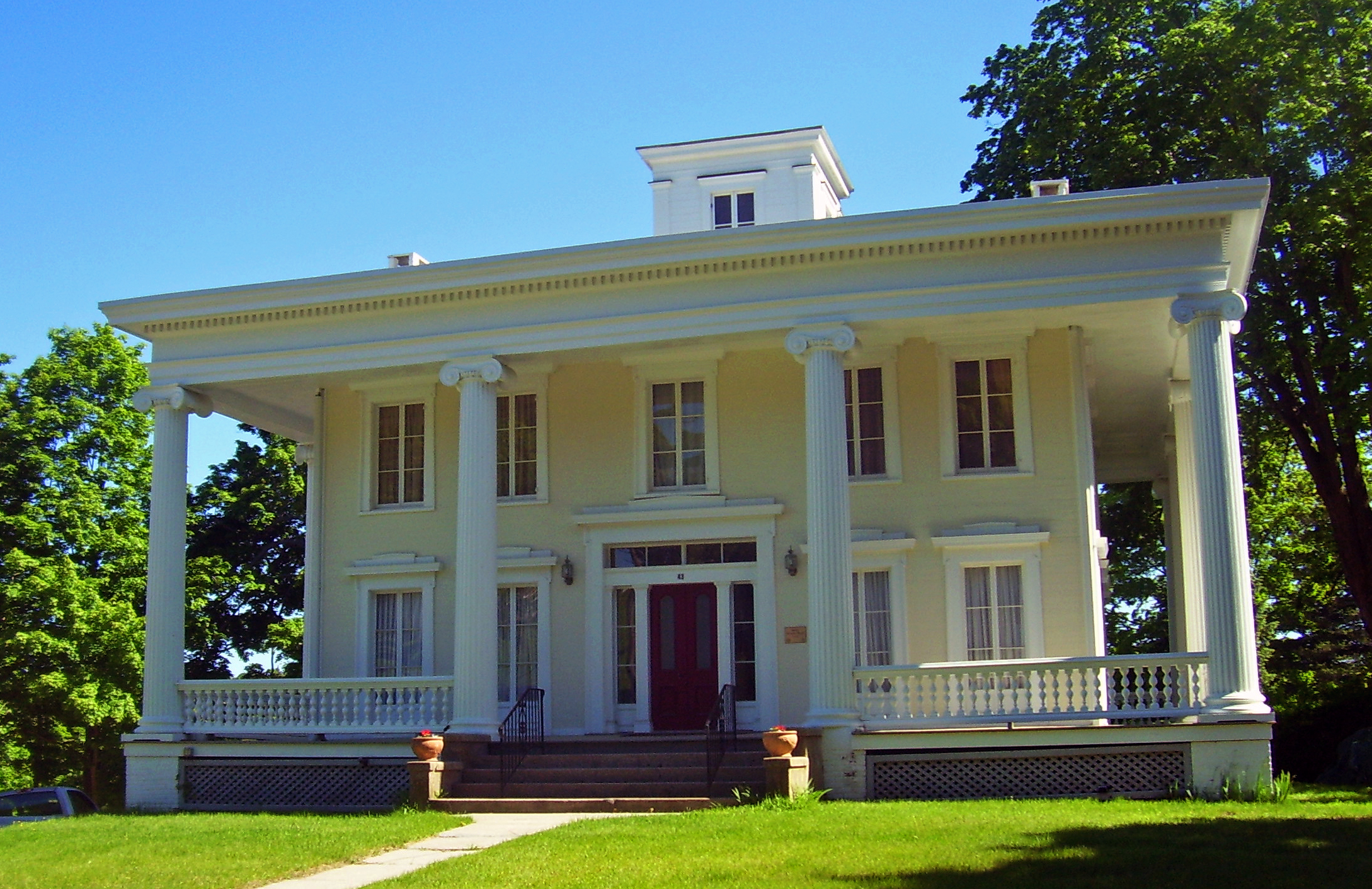
- Front elevation, 2008
- Location: Brewster, NY
- Nearest city: Danbury, CT
- Coordinates: 41°23′42″N 73°36′56″W
- Area: 2 acres (8,100 m^{2})
- Built: ca. 1850
- Architectural style: Greek Revival
- NRHP reference No.: 78001896
- Added to NRHP: 1978

The Walter Brewster House is located on Oak Street in Brewster, New York, United States. It was built in the Greek Revival style around 1850 by Brewster, who founded the village that today bears his name.

It was added to the National Register of Historic Places in 1980. Currently it is owned and operated by the Landmarks Preservation Society of Southeast, New York as an event venue and cultural center.

== Building ==
The two-story frame structure sits on a brick foundation atop a hill overlooking downtown Brewster to the rear. Four Ionic columns on each side support the portico, which juts out some distance from the house proper, the only such arrangement on a Greek Revival house in Putnam County. It has a dentiled cornice.

Currently, The Walter Brewster House serves as an event space for weddings, festivals, corporate parties, fundraisers, meetings and cultural events. The house has been carefully restored and with careful curation, the furnishings and artwork inside represent the Village of Brewster's rich history as well as Walter Brewster and John Gail Borden, important former residents of the house who brought industry and economic development to Brewster.

== History ==
Brewster, a descendant of the Plymouth Colony Brewsters, bought a farm along with his brother and settled in the area around the mid-19th century. The New York and Harlem Railroad was working its way north from New York City, and he not only built a depot, he laid out the village's Main Street and helped found its first hotel.

After numerous owners, who did not appreciate its historical importance, the building became the property of the Landmarks Preservation Society of Southeast in the 1970s. The society renovated it and made it a cultural center, hosting concerts and special events.
