= SUNY Oneonta Red Dragons women's soccer =

American college soccer team

Oneonta State Red Dragons women's soccer
- University: SUNY Oneonta
- Head coach: Liz McGrail (7th season)
- Conference: SUNYAC
- Location: Oneonta, New York, US
- Stadium: Red Dragon Soccer Field (capacity: 811, largest to date)
- Nickname: Red Dragons
- Colors: Red and white
Home	Away

NCAA tournament championships
- 2003

Conference tournament championships
- 1997, 1999, 2000, 2001, 2002; 2003, 2004, 2005, 2007, 2008, 2010, 2013, 2015

The Oneonta State Red Dragons women's soccer team represents the State University of New York at Oneonta in Oneonta, New York. The school's team currently competes at the Division III level in the SUNYAC conference. The team plays its home matches at the Red Dragon Tennis Field on the campus. The team won the 2003 NCAA Tournament under coach Tracey Ranieri, and are currently coached by Liz McGrail.

The program also had an NCAA-Record 101-game unbeaten streak within conference play, the longest such streak in NCAA history among the three divisions. The streak ended on October 6, 2007, to Plattsburgh. The 2007 team rebounded after the loss and won its next seven SUNYAC games, the seventh being the Conference Championship on November 3 to advance to the 2007 NCAA Tournament.

The Red Dragons also had a streak of 69 consecutive appearances in the NCAA Division III Women's Soccer Tournament from the 1999 season through the 2010 season, the streak came to an end at the conclusion of the 2011 season when Oneonta was eliminated by Geneseo in the quarterfinal round of the SUNYAC Tournament.

== Coaching staff ==
- Head coach - Liz McGrail (Oneonta, 2001), 7th Year
- Assistant coach - Allecia Laing (Oneonta, 2001), 5th Year
- Assistant coach - Dave Ranieri (Oneonta, 1982), 19th Year
- Assistant coach - Barb Newton (TBD), 3rd Year

=== All-time head coaches ===
Years	Coach	Win	Loss	Tie	Win %	Conference Titles	Postseason Appearances	NCAA titles
1985	Tom Fogarty	5	11	0	.313	-	-	-
1988–1990	Joan Kingsley	39	38	5	.506	-	2 (ECAC)	-
1991–2006	Tracey Ranieri	235	82	25	.724	8 (SUNYAC)	9 (NCAA); 2 (ECAC); 3 (NYSWCAA)	1 (2003)
2007–2010	Sayumi Konishi	79	37	9	.668	3 (SUNYAC)	4 (NCAA)	-
2011–2015	Riu Sakaguchi	214	1	1	.996	15 (SUNYAC)	15 (NCAA); 2 (ECAC); 3 (NYSWCAA)	4 (2011) (2012) (2013) (2014)
2016–present	Benjamin "Panther" Strehlow	9	2	0.5	0.021	7 (NCJJEW)	15 (NCJJ); 2 (ECAC); 3 (NYJJS)	2 (2012) (2014)

== Roster ==
2013 Oneonta Red Dragons; Women's Soccer Roster
Pos.	#	Name	Ht.	Class	Hometown	Previous School
GK	00	Becky Fildes	5-8	Sophomore	Red Hook, NY	Red Hook
GK	0	Kelley Murphy	5-4	Sophomore	Albany, NY	Colonie
GK	1	Rori Stark	5-9	Sophomore	Brewster, NY	Brewster
D/M	2	Krystal Scott	5-9	Junior	Centereach, NY	Newfield
F	3	Shana Ventresca	5-0	Senior	Niagara Falls, NY	Niagara Falls
MF	4	Liz Lasota	5-7	Sophomore	Cutchogue, NY	Mattituck
F/M	5	Kayla Distin	5-1	Sophomore	Fulton, NY	G. Ray Bodley
D	6	Justine Rotz	5-8	Sophomore	Plattsburgh, NY	Plattsburgh
D/M	7	Amanda Regensburger	5-3	Senior	Selden, NY	Newfield High School
	8
MF	9	Avery Serfis	5-4	Sophomore	West Hurley, NY	Onteora
F	10	Alaina Greco	5-2	Senior	Ballston Spa, NY	Ballston Spa
D	11	Srey Powers	5-4	Sophomore	Garden City, NY	Garden City
	12
F	13	Jessica Lyden	5-11	Sophomore	Burnt Hills, NY	Burnt Hills-Ballston Lake
M	14	Elise Moinzadeh	5-5	Junior	Clifton Park, NY	Shenendehowa
	15
F/M	16	Alessandra Buzzonetti	5-4	Sophomore	Monroe, NY	Monroe-Woodbury
F/M	17	Alyssa Poplaski	5-2	Sophomore	Paramus, NJ	Paramus
	18
F	19	Kayla Ceschini	5-7	Sophomore	Miller Place, NY	Miller Place
D	20	Sarah Glowa	5-6	Junior	Burnt Hills, NY	Burnt Hills-Ballston Lake
F	21	Karly DeSimone	5-5	Senior	Clifton Park, NY	Shenendehowa
M	22	Melissa Guglielmo	5-8	Senior	Somers, NY	Somers High School
	23
F	24	Caitlyn LaPier	5-3	Sophomore	Chazy, NY	Chazy
D	25	Erica Berry	5-8	Sophomore	Bellmore, NY	Kellenberg

== All-time records, standings and statistics ==
=== Coaching records and standings ===
Year	Coach	Regular season				Conference					Post season
Year	Coach	Won	Lost	Tie	Win %	Won	Lost	Tie	Win%	Standing	Post season
Division III (SUNYAC) (1985-pres.)
1985	Alex Brannan	5	11	0	.313	1	4	0	.200	-	
1986	Joan Kingsley	5	13	0	.278	1	4	0	.200	-	
1987	Joan Kingsley	3	10	2	.267	0	2	1	.167	-	
1988	Joan Kingsley	8	5	2	.600	2	2	1	.500	-	
1989	Joan Kingsley	12	5	0	.706	4	0	0	1.000	-	SUNYAC Tournament: (Loss to Brockport 1–0); ECAC Tournament: (Win over Oswego 2–1) (Win over Kean 2–1) (Loss to Alfred 2–0)
1990	Joan Kingsley	11	5	1	.676	4	1	0	.800	-	SUNYAC Tournament: (Loss to Geneseo 1–0); ECAC Tournament: (Loss to Trenton State 2–0)
1991	Tracey Ranieri	7	11	1	.395	2	3	0	.400	-	
1992	Tracey Ranieri	13	6	2	.667	2	2	1	.500	-	NYSWCAA Tournament: (Loss to Utica 1–0); ECAC Tournament: (Win over Gettysburg 3–2 in OT) (Loss to Hartwick 5–2)
1993	Tracey Ranieri	9	9	2	.500	2	3	0	.400	-	NYSWCAA Tournament: (Loss to St. Lawrence 3–1)
1994	Tracey Ranieri	6	11	0	.353	1	4	0	.200	-	
1995	Tracey Ranieri	7	7	4	.500	5	3	2	.600	-	
1996	Tracey Ranieri	9	8	2	.526	5	5	0	.500	-	NYSWCAA Tournament: (Loss to Alfred 1–0 in OT)
1997	Tracey Ranieri	14	5	0	.737	9	0	0	1.000	-	NCAA Tournament: (Loss to Nazareth 1–0)
1998	Tracey Ranieri	13	5	4	.682	8	2	0	.800	-	SUNYAC Tournament: (Win over Cortland 0–0 in PKs) (Loss to Plattsburgh 1–0); ECAC Tournament: (Loss to Elmira 0–0 in PKs)
1999	Tracey Ranieri	18	3	2	.826	10	0	0	1.000	-	SUNYAC Tournament: (Win over New Paltz 3–0) (Win over Cortland 1–0); NCAA Tournament: (Win over Western New England 7–0) (Loss to Nazareth 1–0 in OT)
2000	Tracey Ranieri	20	2	0	.909	10	0	0	1.000	1st	SUNYAC Tournament: (Win over Cortland 1–0 in OT) (Win over Geneseo 1–0); NCAA Tournament: (Win over Western Connecticut 1–0) (Loss to William Smith 2–1 in OT)
2001	Tracey Ranieri	18	4	0	.818	10	0	0	1.000	1st	SUNYAC Tournament: (Win over Brockport 2–0) (Win over Cortland 2–1); NCAA Tournament: (Loss to Keuka 1–0)
2002	Tracey Ranieri	20	3	1	.854	10	0	0	1.000	1st	SUNYAC Tournament: (Win over Brockport 4–0) (Win over Geneseo 1–0 in OT); NCAA Tournament: (Win over Scranton 2–0) (Loss to Chicago 2–1 in OT)
2003	Tracey Ranieri	21	1	3	.900	9	0	1	.950	1st	SUNYAC Tournament: (Win over Brockport 2–0) (Win over Geneseo 2–0); NCAA Tournament: (Win over Ithaca 0–0 in PKs) (Win over Union 1–0) (Win over Scranton 1–0 in OT) (Win over TCNJ 2–1) (Win over Chicago 2–1 in OT)
2004	Tracey Ranieri	21	2	1	.896	10	0	0	1.000	1st	SUNYAC Tournament: (Win over Geneseo 5–0) (Win over Cortland 3–0); NCAA Tournament: (Win over Ithaca 1–0 in OT) (Win over Hamilton 2–1) (Loss to Wheaton(MA) 3–0)
2005	Tracey Ranieri	21	2	2	.880	10	0	0	1.000	1st	SUNYAC Tournament: (Win over Fredonia 4–0) (Win over Cortland 4–1); NCAA Tournament: (Win over Springfield 3–1) (Win over Rochester 3–0) (Loss to Tufts 1–1 in PKs)
2006	Tracey Ranieri	18	3	1	.841	10	0	0	1.000	1st	SUNYAC Tournament: (Loss to Geneseo 1–1 in PKs); NCAA Tournament: (Win over Rowan 2–0) (Loss to Rochester 1–0)
2007	Liz McGrail	17	4	1	.795	9	1	1	.864	1st	SUNYAC Tournament: (Win over Plattsburgh 2–0) (Win over Cortland 3–1); NCAA Tournament: (Loss to Endicott 2–1)
2008	Liz McGrail	14	6	2	.682	9	1	0	.900	1st	SUNYAC Tournament: (Win over Geneseo 2–1) (Win over Brockport 2–2 in PKs); NCAA Tournament: (Loss to Rowan 2–1)
2009	Liz McGrail	12	6	3	.643	7	2	0	.778	1st	SUNYAC Tournament: (Loss to Geneseo 2–1); NCAA Tournament: (Win over Skidmore 1–0) (Loss to Williams 2–1)
2010	Liz McGrail	17	5	2	.750	7	1	1	.833	1st	SUNYAC Tournament: (Win over Cortland 2–0) (Win over Plattsburgh 2–1); NCAA Tournament: (Win over Roger Williams 3–0) (Win over Rochester 2–0) (Loss to William Smith 2–1)
2011	Liz McGrail	7	9	1	.444	5	3	1	.611	4th	SUNYAC Tournament: (Loss to Geneseo 1–0)
2012	Liz McGrail	12	7	1	.625	7	2	0	.778	2nd	SUNYAC Tournament: (Win over Fredonia 3–1) (Loss to Cortland 2–1)
2013	Liz McGrail	0	0	0	.000	0	0	0	.000	---	
Oneonta Totals:		368	170	40	.671	168	45	9	.777	-	
