= Shayna Levy =

Israeli footballer

Personal information
- Full name: Shayna Rebecca Levy
- Date of birth: 6 April 1997 (age 29)
- Place of birth: Brewster, New York, U.S.
- Height: 5 ft 8 in (1.73 m)
- Position: Defender

Youth career
- –2015: North Salem Tigers

College career
Years	Team	Apps	(Gls)
2015–2018	Rochester Yellowjackets	67	(2)

International career^{‡}
2015	Israel U19	5	(0)
2017	Israel	2	(0)
- ‡ National team caps and goals as of 12:47, 30 August 2019 (UTC)

Shayna Rebecca Levy (Hebrew: שיינה רבקה לוי; born 6 April 1997) is a footballer who plays as a defender. Born in the United States, she has appeared for the Israel women's national team.

== Career ==
Levy played for the North Salem Tigers in high school. In college, she played for the Rochester Yellowjackets from 2015 to 2018, scoring 2 goals and recording 1 assist in 67 appearances for the Yellowjackets.

Levy has been capped for the Israel national team, appearing for the team during the 2019 FIFA Women's World Cup qualifying cycle.

== Personal life ==
Levy is a native of Brewster, New York, though she was able to represent Israel through her maternal grandparents.
