= Tilly Foster Mine =

Mine in New York, United States of America

Coordinates: 41°24′45.98″N 73°38′31.09″W

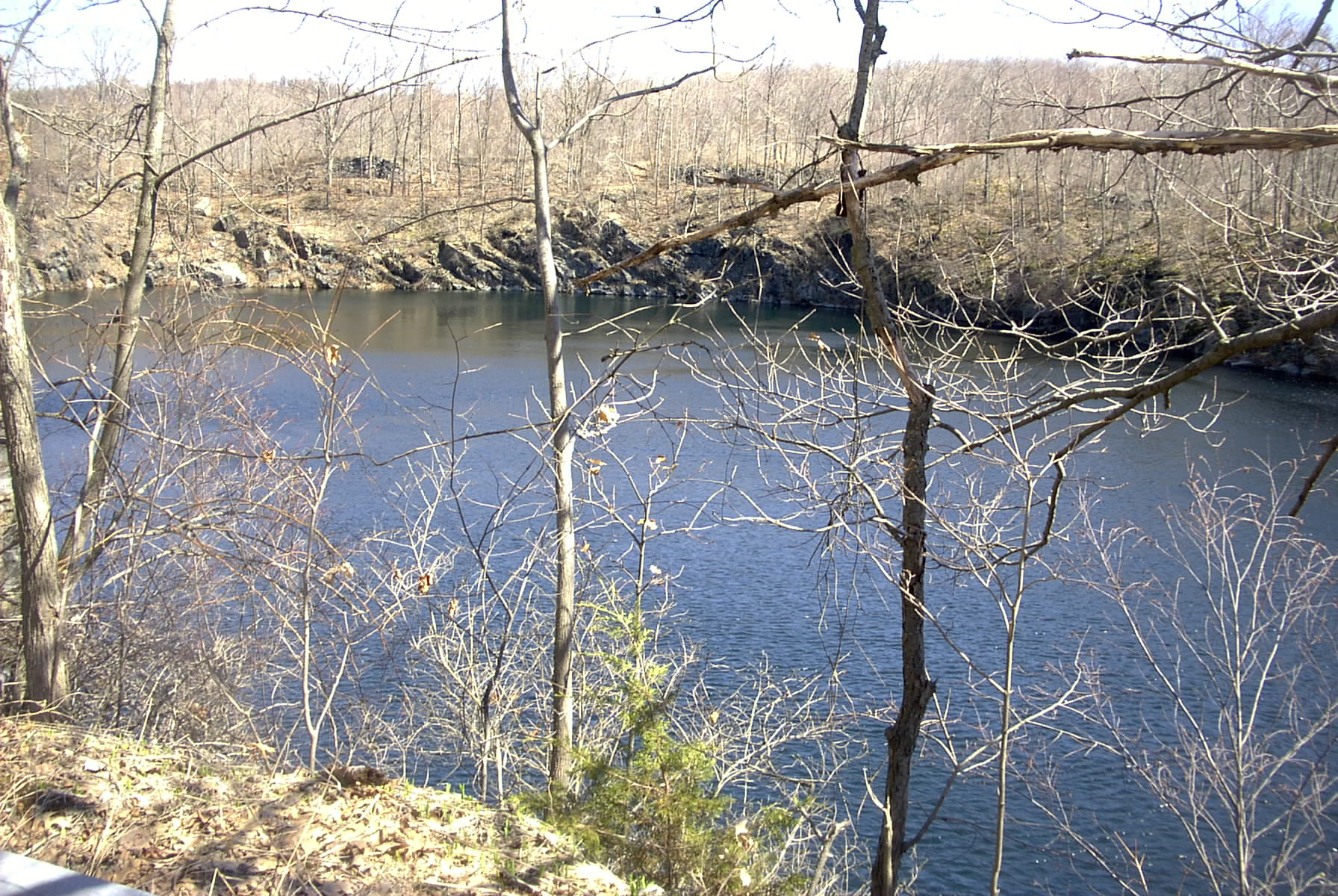
The former site of the Tilly Foster Mine, now flooded

The Tilly Foster Mine was an iron mine in the Town of Southeast in Putnam County, New York, USA, two miles west of the village of Brewster along Route 6.

The Tilly Foster Mine was named for Tilly Foster, who bought the land that the mine was on from George Beale. After Foster's death in 1842, the property passed through several hands before it came into the possession of Harvey Iron and Steel Company. The mine opened in 1853 and employed large numbers of Irish and Italian immigrants. The jobs available at the mine played a large part in bringing immigrants to the town of Southeast. Workers were known by numbers rather than names, because the names of immigrants were considered too difficult to pronounce.

The mine reached its peak of production in the 1870s. It was 600 feet (180 meters) deep. There were 300 miners employed and they were producing 7,000 tons (14,000,000 pounds) of ore per month. The main minerals were magnetite and chondrodite. The iron ore was loaded onto a train to New York City. Large quantities of Bessemer ore were shipped to Scranton, Pennsylvania, and used to make steel rails for the Lackawanna Steel Company.

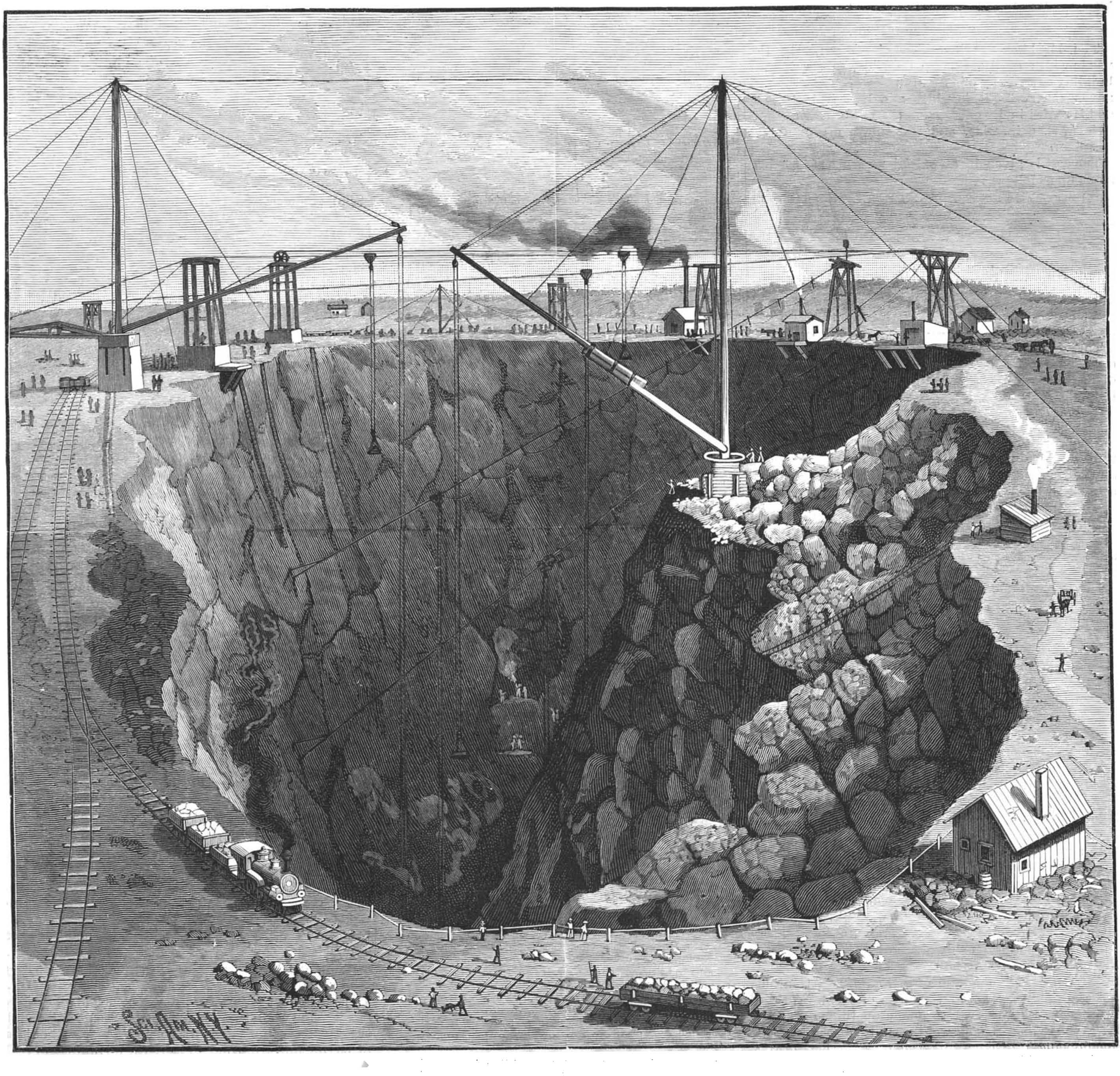
An illustration of the Tilly Foster Mine after it had been made an open pit, 1889

From 1887 to 1889, the mine was made into an open pit. At one time, it was the largest open-pit operation in the world. In 1895, there was a major collapse that killed 13 miners. After the collapse it was flooded by a reservoir nearby. It was used by soldiers in World War II to test their diving equipment. A collection of minerals and artifacts from the mine is at the Southeast Museum in Brewster.

On November 19, 2017, Robert Thomas, 48, went scuba diving at Tilly Foster Mine. He went down without a "buddy" to a depth of 171 feet, became entangled in wires and cables, and never resurfaced. His body was recovered at about 1:00 p.m. the day after he went missing. He and other divers had an agreement with owners of the property to dive at the mine.
