= Longview School =

Location
- 571 North Main Street; Brewster (Putnam County), New York 10509; United States; 41.3942°N 73.6168°W

Information
- Type: Private, Nonprofit
- Established: 2001
- Grades: K-12
- Gender: Coeducational
- Website: www.longviewschool.org

Longview School is a K-12 nonprofit private school located in the Village of Brewster, New York.
