= Bog Brook Reservoir =

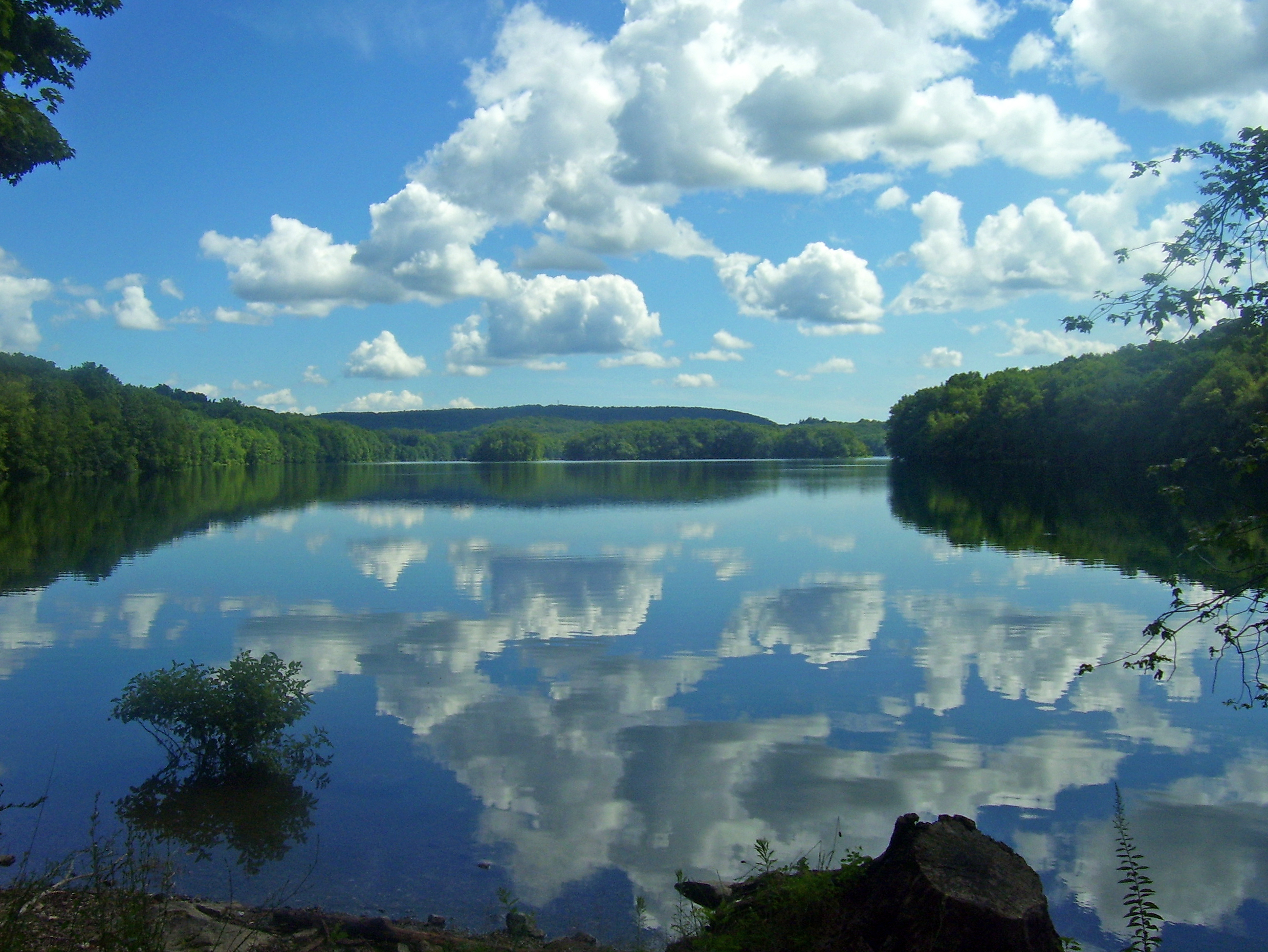

- Location within New York Location within the United States
- Location: Southeast, Putnam County, New York, United States
- Coordinates: 41°24′56.4″N 73°35′8.9″W
- Type: Reservoir
- Primary inflows: Bog Brook
- Catchment area: 4 sq mi (10 km^{2})
- Basin countries: United States
- Built: 1892
- Surface area: 379 acres (153 ha)
- Average depth: 34 feet (10 m)
- Max. depth: 60 feet (18 m)
- Water volume: 4.4 billion US gallons (17,000,000 m^{3})
- Surface elevation: 417 feet (127 m)
- Islands: 2

The Bog Brook Reservoir is a 379-acre (153 ha) reservoir in the Croton Watershed in southern New York State, part of the New York City water supply system. It is located in the town of Southeast in Putnam County, approximately 38 miles (61 km) north of New York City. It was formed by the damming of Bog Brook, a small tributary of the East Branch of the Croton River. The reservoir was put into service in 1892, making it one of the older in the system.

The reservoir has a drainage basin of four square miles (10 km^{2}), and holds 4.4 billion US gallons (17,000,000 m^{3}) of water at full capacity. Its main function is to serve as a storage reservoir for the 5.2 billion US gallons (20,000,000 m^{3}) East Branch Reservoir, to which it is connected by a tunnel.

The Bog Brook Reservoir is one of 12 reservoirs in the Croton Watershed.

From the East Branch Reservoir, the water flows into the continuation of the East Branch of the Croton River, then into The Diverting Reservoir, then via the Croton River to the Muscoot Reservoir and the New Croton Reservoir, into the New Croton Aqueduct, and finally to the Jerome Park Reservoir in the Bronx for distribution to New York City.

== See also ==
- List of reservoirs and dams in New York
