= Southeast, New York =

- Town
- Town of Southeast
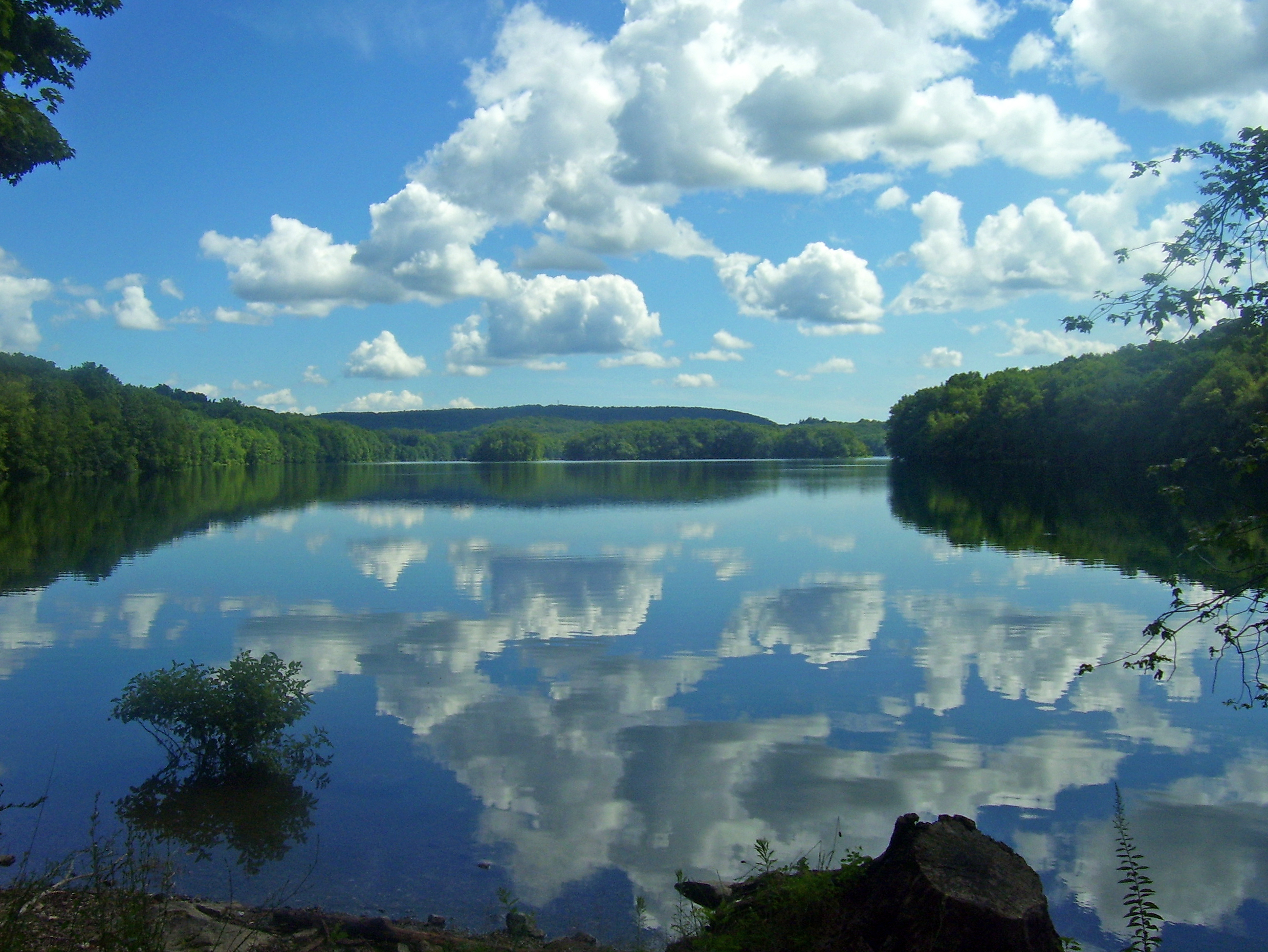
- Bog Brook Reservoir

- Seal

- Location of Southeast, New York
- Coordinates: 41°24′N 73°36′W
- Country: United States
- State: New York
- County: Putnam

Area
  - Total: 34.98 sq mi (90.60 km^{2})
  - Land: 31.73 sq mi (82.19 km^{2})
  - Water: 3.25 sq mi (8.41 km^{2})
- Elevation: 338 ft (103 m)

Population (2020)
  - Total: 18,058
  - Estimate (2022): ▲18,118
  - Density: 572.5/sq mi (221.05/km^{2})
- Time zone: UTC-5 (Eastern (EST))
  - Summer (DST): UTC-4 (EDT)
- ZIP code: 10509
- Area code: 845
- FIPS code: 36-68924
- GNIS feature ID: 0979507
- Website: www.southeast-ny.gov

Southeast is a town in Putnam County, New York, United States, so named for its location in the southeastern corner of the county. The population was 18,058 at the 2020 census. The town as a whole is informally referred to as Brewster, the town's principal settlement; the latter is also an incorporated village within the town's borders. Interstate 84, Interstate 684, U.S. Route 202, US Route 6, and NY 22 are the primary routes through the town.

== History ==
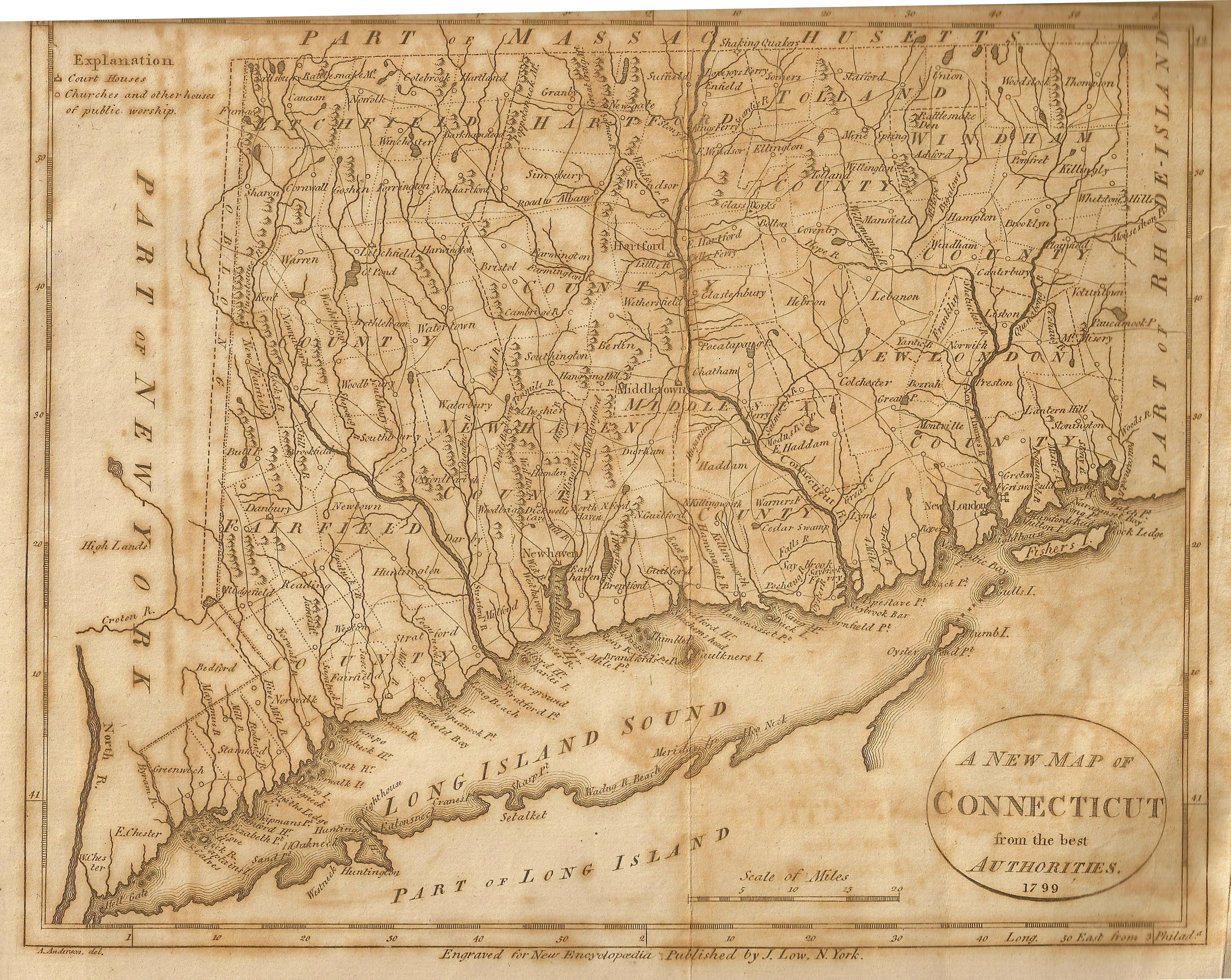
A 1799 map of Connecticut which shows The Oblong. From Low's Encyclopaedia.

The first settler arrived circa 1730. The area first exploited was called "The Oblong," and was outside of the land claimed by the Philipse Patent. Due to a border dispute between New York and Connecticut, the area between the undisputed border of New York and the undisputed border of Connecticut was an approximately 4-mile-wide (6 km) area which ran the full north-south dimension along the state line, in what are now Westchester, Putnam, Dutchess, and Columbia Counties. This was called the Oblong. Land was sold in this area, both by the governor of New York and the King of England for Connecticut, with conflicting deeds. The boundary was settled in New York's favor by the 1731 Treaty of Dover.

A small portion of the Oblong, namely the portion in the Philipse Patent (now Putnam County), was alternately known as Southeast as it was the southeasternmost town in Dutchess County. It consisted of the four-mile-wide section of land along the Connecticut border, going the full north-south dimension of what is now Putnam County, i.e. the eastern part of the current town of Patterson, and the eastern part of the current town of Southeast. The western parts of those two current towns were part of the large Phillipse Patent which had not yet been divided into towns.

The most heavily settled areas of the "Oblong" version of Southeast were the "city" of Frederickstown, now the hamlet of Patterson, and the area called Sodom. This version of Southeast was founded in 1788, and formed the southeast corner of Dutchess County. In 1795, Frederickstown, the town that had been Southeast's neighbor, was divided into the present towns of Carmel, Kent, and Patterson, the latter two known at first as "Frederick" and "Franklin", and at the same time, Southeast lost its northern half to Patterson, and expanded to the west to become the shape it is now. Putnam County split from Dutchess in 1812. The most densely populated area in the town today is the village of Brewster.

== Post offices ==
The first "South East" post office was established in 1797, when the town was still a municipality in Dutchess County. On June 12, 1812, the county of Putnam was established from six Dutchess County towns: Carmel, Kent, Patterson, Philipstown, Putnam Valley and Southeast. These two dates provide a frame of reference for the dates of operation of each Southeast post office.

Before the establishment of centralized post offices, local offices were established in general stores, railroad depots and other public venues in densely populated areas. In Southeast, there were nine individual post offices, each with distinctive postmarks:

- Brewster's Station from 1850 to 1883
- Brewster from 1883 to date
- Doanesburgh from 1839 to 1855
- Dykman's from 1851 to 1894
- Dykemans from 1894 to 1935
- Milltown from 1826 to 1867
- Putnam Lake Branch 1959 to 1968
- South East 1797 to 1812 (Dutchess County)
- South East 1812 to 1857 (Putnam County)
- Tilly Foster 1881 to 1958

By September 1968, the last of these local offices was closed, and the only post office for the town of Southeast and village of Brewster was located at 20 Main Street with the postmark "Brewster, New York 10509". In the 1990s this USPS branch relocated to 3 Mount Ebo Road in the Doansburgh section of Southeast, no longer in the village of Brewster, but retained the "Brewster 10509" name and ZIP code.

== Geography ==
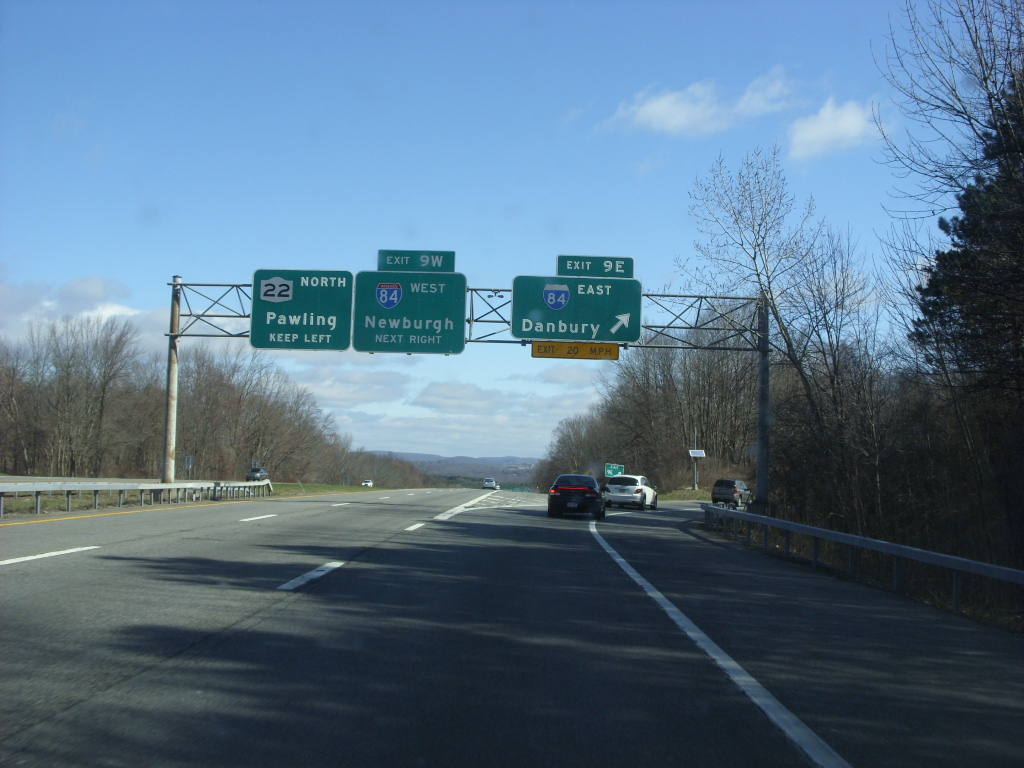
Interstates 84 and 684 meet in Southeast

According to the United States Census Bureau, the town has a total area of 35.0 square miles (91 km^{2}), of which 32.1 square miles (83 km^{2}) is land and 2.9 square miles (7.5 km^{2}), or 8.35%, is water. The town contains several reservoirs that supply New York City.

The eastern town line borders Fairfield County, Connecticut, and the southern town boundary borders northern Westchester County.

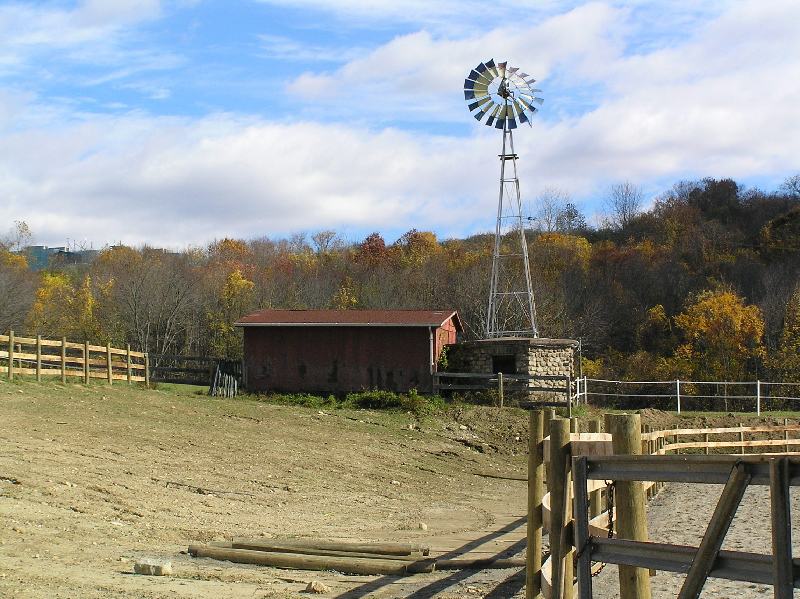
The windmill at Tilly Foster Farm

Metro-North Railroad's Brewster station and Southeast station serve the town, and are located on the Harlem Line. From Southeast, express trains to Grand Central Terminal take about 80 minutes.

== Demographics ==
Historical population
Census	Pop.	Note	%±
1820	1,909		—
1830	2,042		7.0%
1840	1,910		−6.5%
1850	2,079		8.8%
1860	2,350		13.0%
1870	2,075		−11.7%
1880	3,500		68.7%
1890	4,082		16.6%
1900	2,843		−30.4%
1910	3,282		15.4%
1920	3,260		−0.7%
1930	3,503		7.5%
1940	4,053		15.7%
1950	4,388		8.3%
1960	6,844		56.0%
1970	9,901		44.7%
1980	11,416		15.3%
1990	14,927		30.8%
2000	17,316		16.0%
2010	18,404		6.3%
2020	18,058		−1.9%
U.S. Decennial Census

As of the census of 2020, there were 18,058, 7,058 households, and 6,516 families residing in the town. The racial makeup of the town was 71.95% White, 0.027% African American, 0.69% Native American, 2.65% Asian, 0.04% Pacific Islander, 10.3% from other races, and 11.6% from two or more races. Hispanic or Latino of any race were 24.98% of the population.

There were 6,516 households, out of which 22.0% had children under the age of 18 living with them, 59.6% were married couples living together, 23.5% had a female householder with no husband present, and 13.4% had a male householder with no wife present. 77.1% of all households were made up of individuals, and 17.3% had someone living alone who was 65 years of age or older. The average household size was 2.77 and the average family size was 3.18.

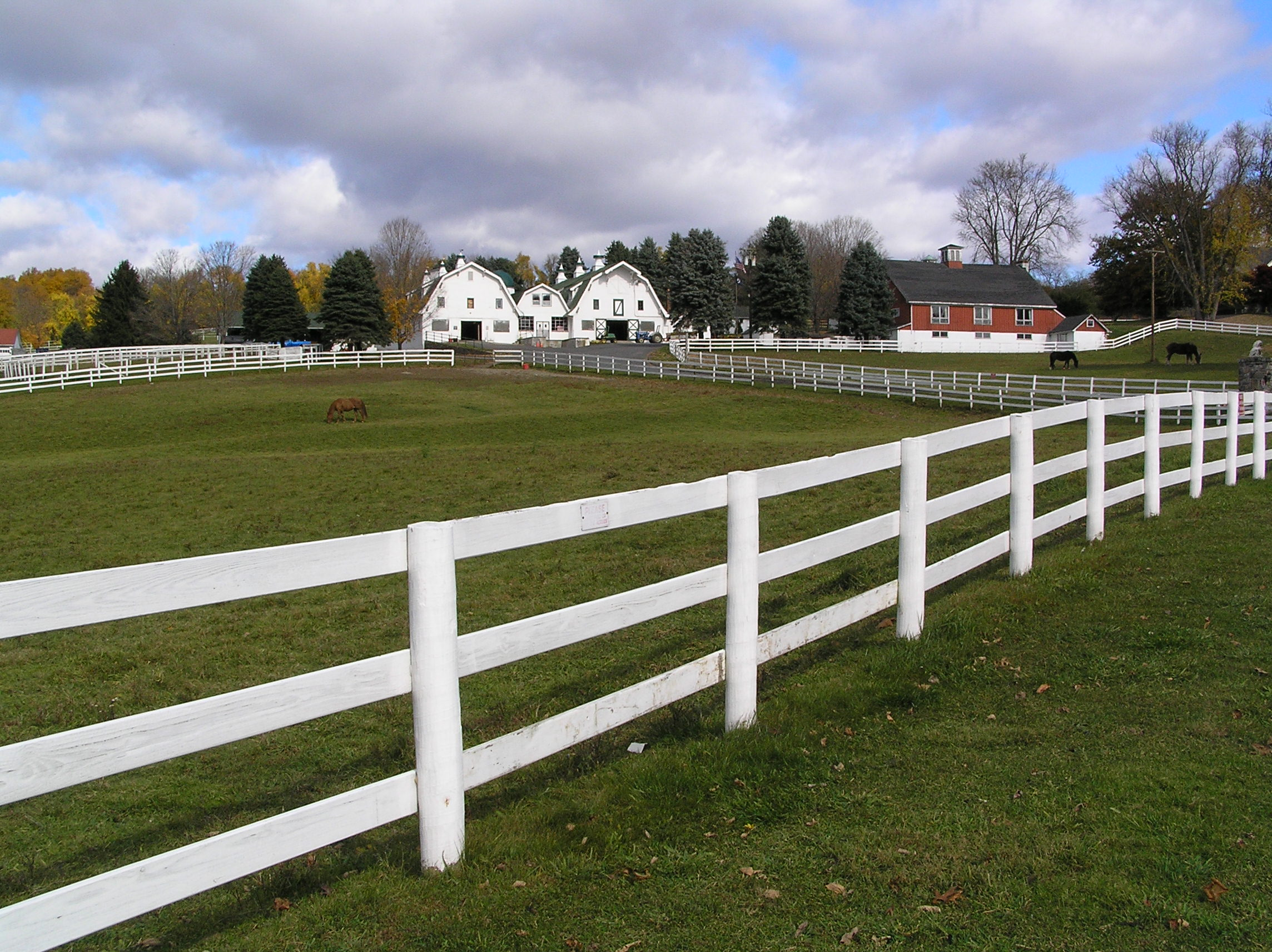
Tilly Foster Farm

In the town, the population was spread out, with 27.1% under the age of 18, 22.0% from 18 to 24, 78.0% from 25 to 64, and 17.3% who were 65 years of age or older. The median age was 41.9 years.

The median income for a household in the town was $104,167, and the median income for a family was $119,232. About 5.2% of the population were below the poverty line, including 5.8% of those under age 18 and 2.6% of those age 65 or over.

== Government ==
Southeast is governed by a town board. Southeast town hall is located on New York State Route 22 in Brewster, New York. Law enforcement services for Southeast are provided by the New York State Police and the Putnam County sheriff's office. The village of Brewster has its own police department.

== Communities and locations in Southeast ==
- Bog Brook Reservoir – A reservoir near the center of the town.
- Brewster – A centrally located village within the town.
- Brewster Heights – A hamlet west of Brewster village.
- Brewster Hill – A hamlet north of Brewster village.
- Deans Corners – A hamlet in the southwestern part of the town.
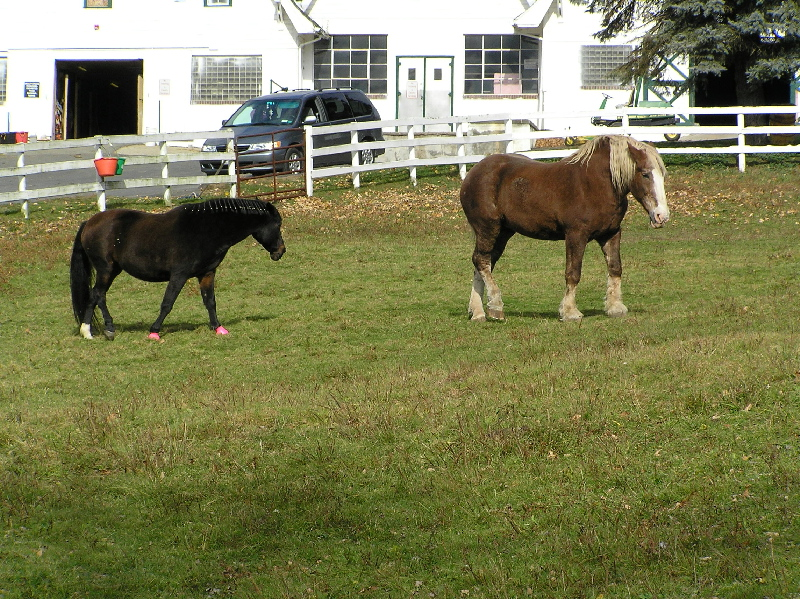
  Horses at Tilly Foster Farm
- Deforest Corners – A hamlet in the northeastern corner of the town, northeast of Sears Corners.
- Doansburg Preserve – a 13 acre preserve; one of the Putnam County Land Trust properties.
- Drewville Heights – A hamlet in the southwestern part of the town.
- Dykemans – A hamlet on Route 312, north of Brewster Hill.
- East Branch Reservoir – A reservoir east of Brewster and south of Bog Brook Reservoir.
- Fieldstone Pond – Condo community off Doansburg Road.
- Milltown – A hamlet near the eastern town line.
- Peach Lake – A hamlet in the southeastern corner of the town, located at the northeast shore of a small lake also called Peach Lake.
- Sears Corners – A hamlet by the intersection of Routes 22 and 312 in the northeastern part of the town.
- Sodom – A location east of Brewster village.
- Tilly Foster – A hamlet near the western town line.
- Tilly Foster Mine – an abandoned mine adjacent to Tilly Foster Farm Museum.

== Notable people ==
- Julius Baker, most highly regarded flutist of his generation; principal flutist of the New York Philharmonic, founding member of the Bach Aria Group
- Chester Beach, sculptor
- Fanny Crosby, hymnist
- Ava Fabian, playboy model and actress
- Maurice R. Greenberg, former chairman and CEO of AIG
- Dag Hammarskjöld, Secretary General of the United Nations from 1953 until his death in 1961
- James Kent, Chancellor of New York 1814–23
- Mark Rivera, saxophone player (Billy Joel, Elton John, Ringo Starr)
- John Wolff, Georgetown University law professor
