= Brewster High School (Brewster, New York) =

Coordinates: 41°26′31″N 73°36′12″W

Location
- 50 Foggintown Road; Brewster, New York 10509; United States

Information
- School type: public high school
- Established: January of 1973
- School district: Brewster Central School District
- Superintendent: Laurie Bandlow
- School code: 330500
- Principal: Nichole Horler
- Faculty: 110+
- Teaching staff: 90.58 (FTE)
- Grades: 9 – 12
- Student to teacher ratio: 11.92
- Hours in school day: 7:45 - 2:35 (7 hours)
- Colors: Green, White & Silver
- Slogan: "Every Student A Success"
- Athletics: Class A
- Sports: Section 1 (NYSPHSAA)
- Mascot: Bear
- Nickname: The Brew Crew
- Team name: Brewster Bears
- Rival: Somers Tuskers
- Newspaper: Bear Facts
- Yearbook: Resume
- Website: BHS

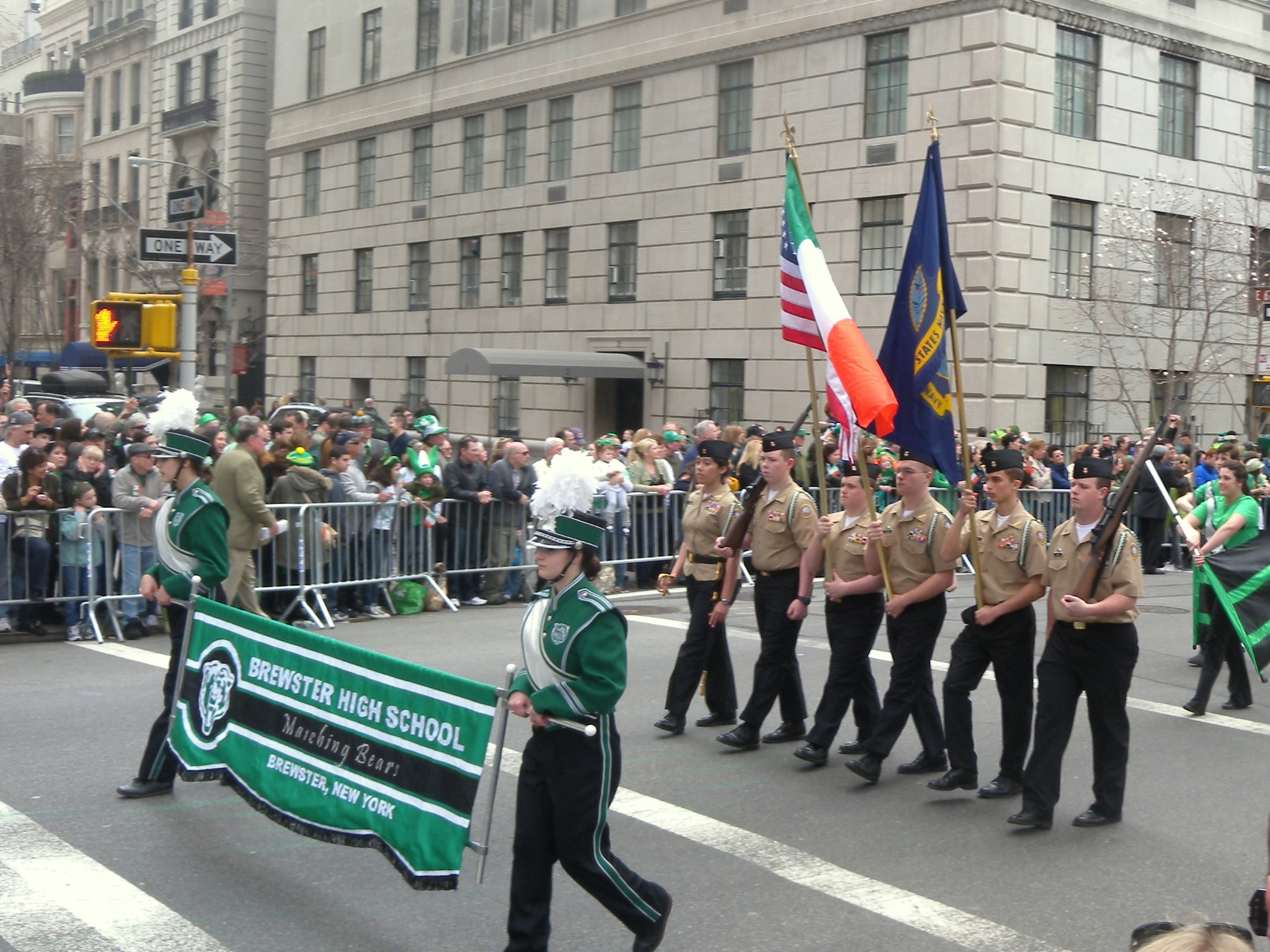
Color guard marching in Manhattan

Brewster High School (BHS) is a comprehensive public secondary school in Brewster, New York, for grades 9-12 with an enrollment of approximately 1,100 students and over 110 teachers and support personnel.

It was built in 1971 and was the fourth building added to the Brewster Central School District. The building grew in size with the addition of music, math, and science wings due to a major bond issue in 1999.

== NJROTC Unit ==
Since 2010, the high school has maintained a company-sized Naval Junior Reserve Officers' Training Corps (NJROTC), led by Commander Earl Waidelech, who retired by 2022.

The NJROTC is a program of academic courses, co-curricular activities involving field trips to naval and military bases, and extracurricular opportunities, including interschool exhibition drill and athletics. The academic portion of the program is divided into three non-sequential courses, NJROTC 1R through NJROTC 3R, and covers various disciplines, including career planning, study skills, early naval history, and current naval ships and aircraft. The NJROTC 4R course for seniors is structured as a seminar course, with emphasis placed on performance in various duties in the cadet company based upon previous experience, if any, in the program.

The corps is organized into the following:

- Corps High Staff (Commander, Chief, and Civilian Assistant)
- Corps Staff (Students, elected by the corps)
- A Company (1-3 Platoons)
- B Company (4-6 Platoons)
- Armed Drill Platoon (equipped with M1 Garand, all formerly used in active-duty)
- Unarmed Senior Drill Platoon (Juniors & Seniors, only Petty Officer 1st Class)
- Unarmed Junior Drill Platoon (Freshmen & Sophomores)
- (2016–2017) Corps Band
- (2017–2018 season) Trick Elite Team

== Marching Band ==
Since 2006, the high school has maintained a marching band known as the Brewster High School Marching Band, commonly referred to as the "Marching Bears". Members of the marching band are volunteers in grades 8 to 12. From 2007 to 2016, the band leader was George Viglucci, who also led the high school's orchestra and jazz band. He was succeeded by Christopher Vlangas, who was replaced in 2017 by Brian Sanyshyn after Vlangas was arrested for engaging in a sexual relationship with a 16-year-old student. The band's assistant director in 2018 and 2019 was Andrea Perdicho, who leads the high school band.

- Band Director
  - 2006–2016: George Viglucci
  - 2017: Christopher Vlangas (arrested and subsequently removed)
  - 2018–2025: Brian Sanyshyn
  - 2026- Present: Richie Grasso
- Band Assistant
  - 2016–2017: Christopher Valangas
  - 2017: Brian Sanyshyn
  - 2018–2020: Andrea Perdicho
- Yearly Focus
  - 2011–2012: Wizard of Oz
  - 2012-2013: Michael Jackson's Thriller
  - 2014-2015: Heroes (The Incredibles, James Bond, and Hawaii Five-0)
  - 2017–2018: Ocean & Navies (Pirates of the Caribbean (Dead Man's Chest), Russian Sailor's Dance, and Come Sail Away)
  - 2018–2019: John Williams (Summon the Heroes, Star Wars, Indiana Jones, and Jurassic Park)
  - 2020–2021: Queen (We Will Rock You, Another One Bites the Dust, We Are the Champions, Somebody to Love, and Bohemian Rhapsody)

The band has performed at many high-profile events, including a wedding proposal on the USS Intrepid (CV-11) in New York City (see:Intrepid Sea, Air & Space Museum). Since 2008, the band performs at the New York City Saint Patrick's Day Parade each year, and Brewster's Memorial Day parade. The period between Band Camp in August until Thanksgiving is referred to as the "Football Season", when the band performs their half-time show during the high school's football home games. The later period between the end of winter break at the end of February and June is referred to as "Marching Season".

The band has performed at many events, including:

- Philadelphia Saint Patrick's Day Parade
- On the deck of the USS Intrepid (CV-11)
- Edison Pageant of Light Parade in Fort Myers, Florida
- Walt Disney World
- Busch Gardens
- Canada's Wonderland
- Shea Stadium/Citi Field
- On the Today Show

In 2013, the band performed at the Saint Patrick's Day Parade in Dublin and Limerick in the Republic of Ireland.

In 2017, the band started annually performing at Madison Square Garden during the 2K Empire Classic if a college or university's pep band wasn't able to perform themselves. In 2017, this was for Texas A&M University, 2018 for Cal Berkeley, and again in 2019 for Berkeley. In 2018, the band started to perform annually during the June Relay for Life.

In 2021, the band was due to go to Rome with the NJROTC Color Guard, which normally accompany them to events. However, this was canceled due to the COVID-19 pandemic.

The current organization of the band includes:

- Band Staff
- Percussion Section
- Brass Section
- Low Brass Section
- Woodwind Section
- Color Guard (non-NJROTC)
- Supporting Staff & Boosters (non-band members who help the band during events)

== Notable events ==
In October 2017, the NJROTC leader, Christopher Vlangas, was charged with one count of criminal sex act and two counts of rape in the third degree in Patterson; he was charged with one count of criminal sexual act and one count of rape in the third degree in Southeast. These charges came about after his relationship with a 16-year-old student were reported to a high school staff member.

The Morning Brew was created in September 2021; it is a morning show that airs biweekly. The episodes contain information about school events and changes, including a sports segment.

== Notable alumni ==
- Michael Imperioli (1983), actor
- Jason Dellaero, Major League Baseball player for the Chicago White Sox
- John Shedletsky, former Creative Director for Roblox
