= Brewster, New York =

- Village
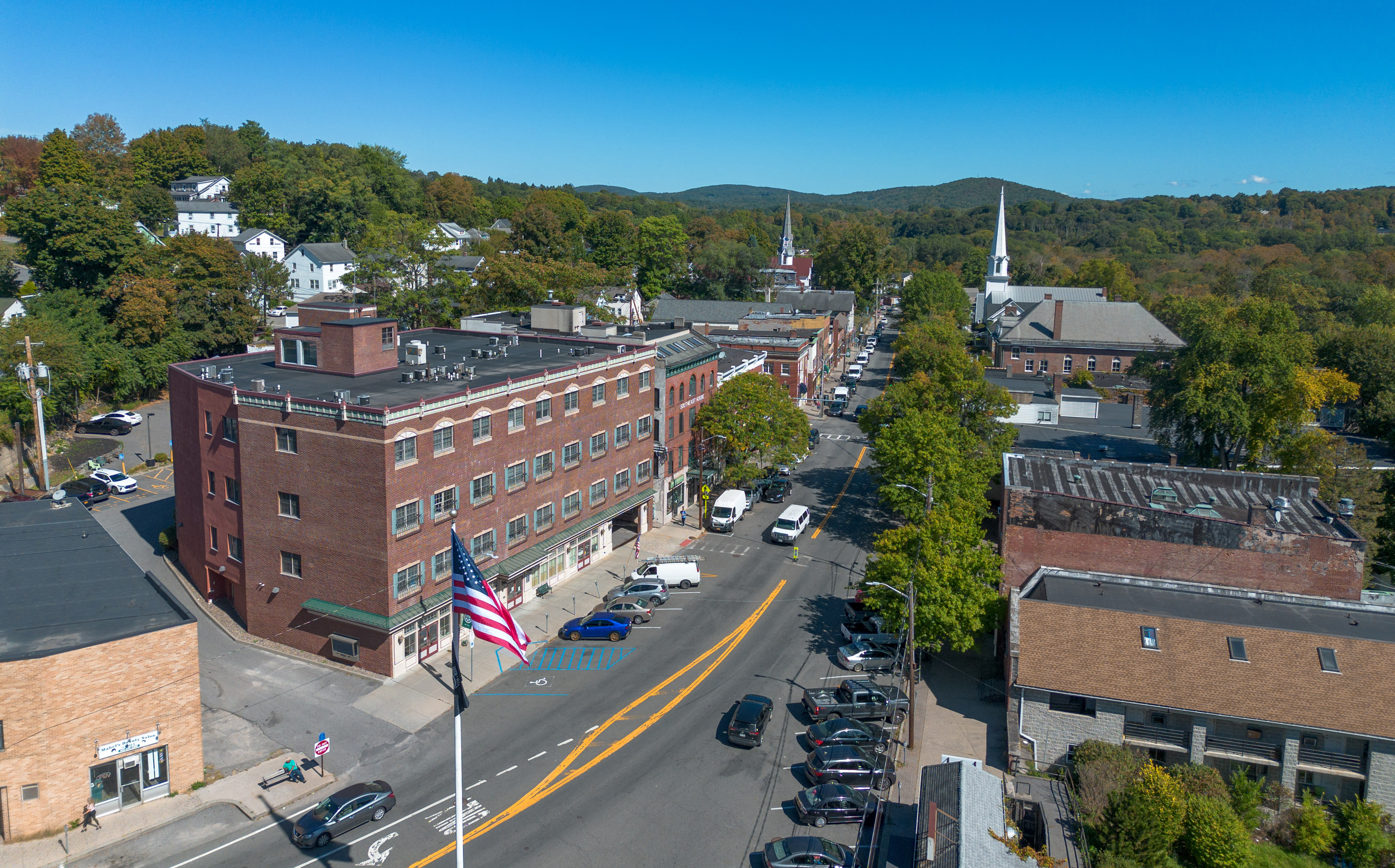
- Brewster in 2025

- Seal

- Location in Putnam County and the state of New York.
- Coordinates: 41°23′46″N 73°36′57″W
- Country: United States
- State: New York
- County: Putnam
- Town: Southeast

Area
  - Total: 0.49 sq mi (1.28 km^{2})
  - Land: 0.49 sq mi (1.27 km^{2})
  - Water: 0.0039 sq mi (0.01 km^{2})
- Elevation: 466 ft (142 m)

Population (2020)
  - Total: 2,508
  - Density: 5,112.7/sq mi (1,974.01/km^{2})
- Time zone: UTC−5 (Eastern (EST))
  - Summer (DST): UTC−4 (EDT)
- ZIP Code: 10509
- Area code: 845, 914, 329
- FIPS code: 36-08070
- GNIS feature ID: 0944699
- Website: www.brewstervillage-ny.gov

Brewster is a village and the principal settlement within the town of Southeast in Putnam County, New York, United States. The population was 2,508 at the 2020 census. The village, which is the most densely populated portion of the county, was named for two early farmer landowners, Walter and James Brewster, who donated land for the Brewster railroad station in 1848.

== History ==
The village of Brewster derives its name from that of the landowner, Walter Brewster, who invited the New York and Harlem Railroad to build a depot on his property in 1848. Brewster's Station, New York (sometimes just "Brewster's"), appeared on maps, on postcards, and in directories of Putnam County throughout the second half of the 19th century. It was officially incorporated as the Village of Brewster, New York, in 1894.

In 1886, historian William Smith Pelletreau published The History of Putnam County, New York. In his second chapter on the town of Southeast, he wrote: "The land now [1886] embraced within the limits of the village of Brewster consists of a farm which was sold by the commissioners of forfeiture to Peleg Bailey, in 1781. A portion of it afterward passed into the possession of Bailey Howes, his grandson, who sold 98 acres to Gilbert Bailey on April 1, 1833. Two other tracts containing 39 acres were sold to Gilbert Bailey, by William P. Downs and Frederick Parks in 1838. On February 17, 1848, Gilbert Bailey sold the whole tracts, estimated at 134 acres, to James and Walter F. Brewster, for the sum of $8,000."

"At the time of the purchase, the New York and Harlem Railroad was finished and trains were running as far as Croton Falls. The road was surveyed as far as Pawling, and the prospect of its being continued to that point seemed certain, and to the new purchasers of the farm it seemed just the place for a station."

"The New York and Harlem Railroad was finished to this place and the depot was built in that year, and what is now [1886] the Main street was opened, for the purpose of allowing the stages from Danbury to come to the station. Previous to this the firm of Crosby and DeForest had run a line of four horse stages to Croton Falls, from Danbury. The first new house in the place was built by Walter F. Brewster, in 1850 and stood in front of the present [1886] Methodist church." That house, now listed as the Walter Brewster House on the New York State and national historic registers, is owned by the Landmark Preservation Society of Southeast.

"The Harlem Railroad's extension of its mileage in 1849 proved advantageous to Mr. Brewster, who needed all sorts of materials in his building activities. Large shipments were billed simply to 'Brewster's Station' for lack of better designation. This is the apparent origin of the village's name, which many years ago was shortened to Brewster."

=== Post offices ===
Jonathan F. Frost was the first Postmaster of the Brewster's Station post office, which operated from October 25, 1850, through April 28, 1883.

During this period in American history, post offices were frequently located in the stores or businesses owned by the individuals who served as postmasters. This held true in the village of Brewster for the next century.

In 1863, the Brewster Station post office relocated to the A.F. Lobdell General Store, across from the railroad station, the present location of the Avery Building at 12–18 Main Street. Alexander F. Lobdell, the store's proprietor, was appointed postmaster by President Abraham Lincoln and was reappointed by Presidents Grant, Hayes, Garfield and Arthur, continuing as Brewster's postmaster until 1887. The Brewster post office began operation on April 28, 1883, removing the word "Station" in its identity and postmarks.

In 1887, the post office relocated to the Brewster Standard building, the present location of the Sprague Building at 31 Main Street. In 1886, Emerson W. Addis, publisher of the Brewster Standard weekly newspaper, became the postmaster and held that position until 1916.

In 1916, the post office moved to new quarters on Park Street, between Main Street and Marvin Avenue, into the Rundall Building, and John Thorp became the new postmaster.

In 1923, Ralph Diehl, proprietor of the Brewster Bakery, became postmaster, and the post office was moved to his baking plant on Progress Street in 1927. Howard Tuttle later became the postmaster, holding the position until 1934 when Seth Howes was appointed. In 1936, the post office relocated to the building now occupied by the Eagle Eye Thrift Shop at 65 Main Street.

Mr. Howes held the office until 1958 when John F. Larkin Jr. was made acting postmaster. He was later promoted to the full title of postmaster.

On July 17, 1966, the post office relocated to a new brick building on Main Street, where it remained for the next three decades. Mr. Larkin retired in 1972 and was succeeded by Earl Tuttle, who became the last Southeast resident to hold the position of postmaster since that time. Mr. Tuttle retired in 1985.

The new facility was the first Brewster post office to occupy a space that was specifically designed for the purpose, rather than being retrofitted from some previous use. It had a separate lobby to house post office boxes, a loading dock at the rear of the building and a postal inspector's separate entrance and hallway with one-way glass for observing postal workers and the public.

In the mid-1990s, the Main Street facility closed and a new post office opened at its present location at 3 Mount Ebo Road North outside the village limits in the town of Southeast. Although the new facility is more than 3 miles (5 km) from the center of Brewster, it still retains the designation and postmark "Brewster 10509".

=== "Brewster" vs. "Southeast" ===
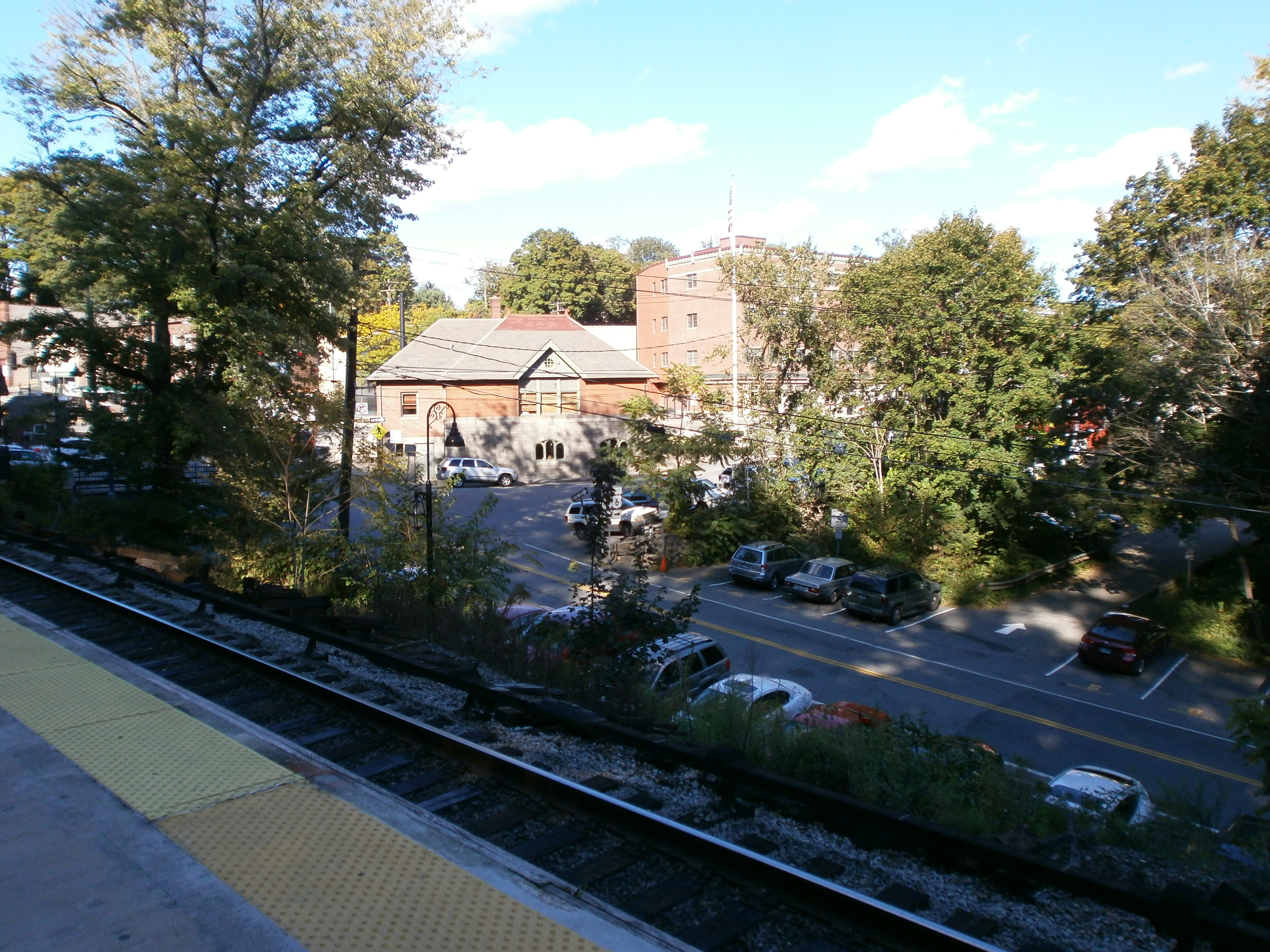
View of village from train station

Before 1962, there were several local post offices throughout the town of Southeast, located near larger concentrations of residences and businesses. The last of these, Southeast's Putnam Lake post office, closed in 1968. When a new post office opened at 16 Main Street in Brewster on July 17, 1966, even before Interstate 84 and Interstate 684 were constructed, it was named Brewster and given the zip code 10509.

== Brewster Crossing ==
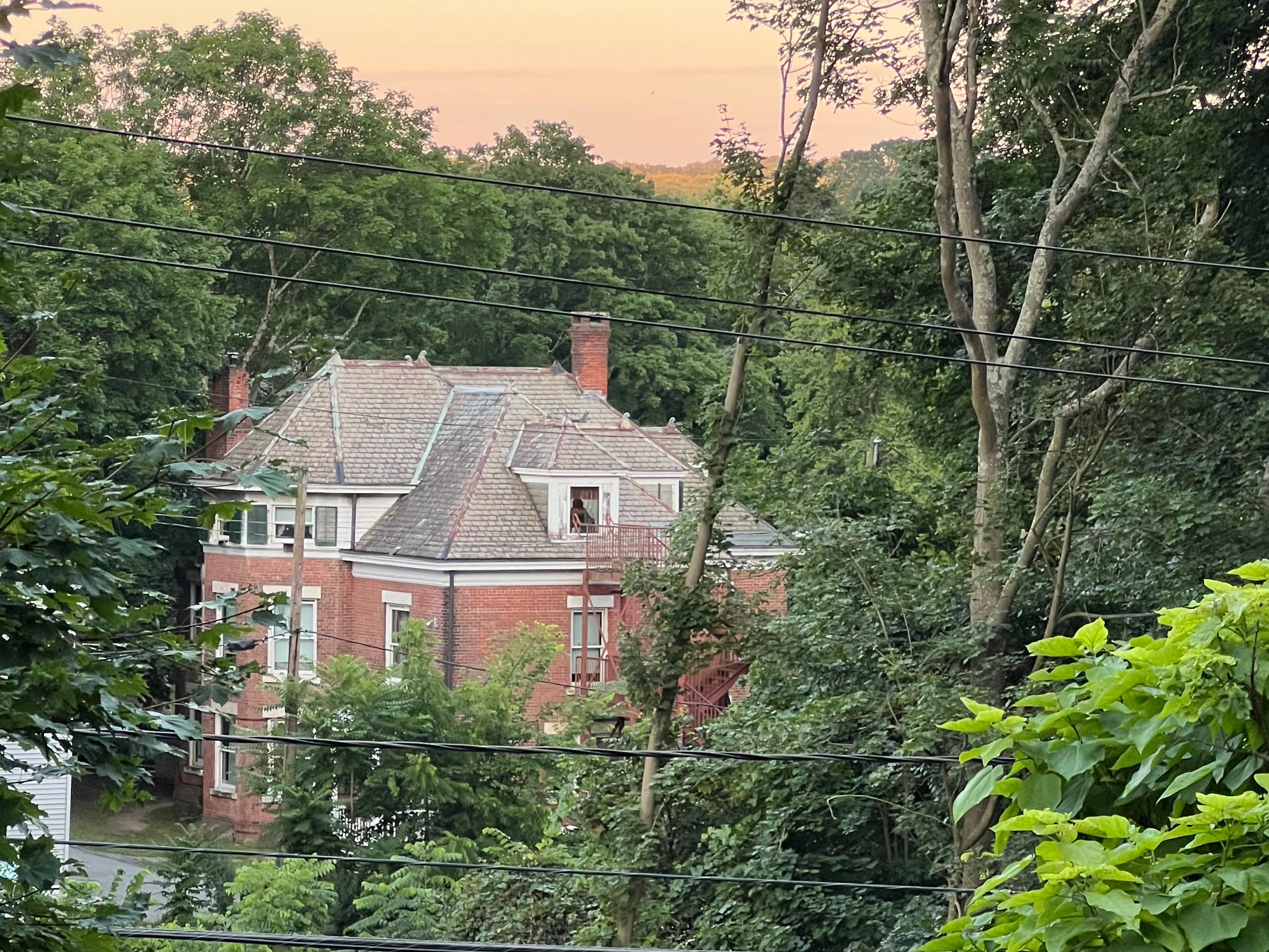
Multi-family heritage home slated for demolition, as seen from the Brewster train platform.

Urban renewal plans for the Village of Brewster have been in the works for well over a decade. In 2011, a blight determination study was conducted to identify primary contributors to the community's decline and determine potential redevelopment strategies. The study revealed that 15% of the properties in the surveyed area were considered blighted. These findings prompted a transit-focused redevelopment plan, targeting five distinct subareas in need of improvement. The primary objectives of the plan are to transform underused and/or deteriorating properties into spaces for retail and housing, thereby generating economic activity and supporting the use of the Metro-North Brewster train station. The project, officially dubbed Brewster Crossing, has garnered support from many local residents. However, it has also been met with resistance from others, as it requires the acquisition & clearance of properties that are neither underused nor deteriorating. Long-standing food establishment, Bob's Diner, is one of many businesses slated for demolition. Other notable properties impacted include the Jack & Jill Pool Hall and A.F. Lobdell estate (c. 1860), in addition to other Victorian-era buildings. The anticipated completion date is set for 2027.

== Geography ==
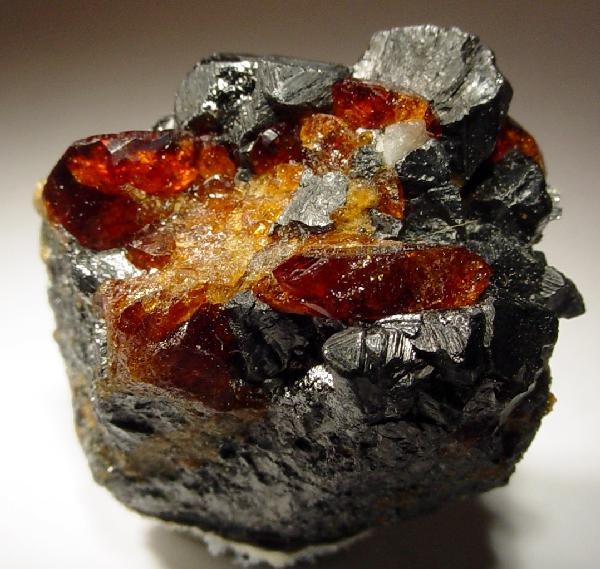
Red chondrodite and black magnetite from the old Tilly Foster Mine in Brewster

Brewster is located along the East Branch of the Croton River at 41°23′46″N 73°36′57″W (41.396050, −73.615954), near the center of the town of Southeast.

U.S. Route 6 runs through the village as its Main Street. U.S. Route 202 and New York State Route 22 run concurrently along the southern boundary of the village, and Interstate 84 passes just east of the village, intersecting Interstate 684. The Brewster train station is on the Harlem Line.

According to the United States Census Bureau, the town has a total area of 1.5 square miles (3.9 km^{2}), all land.

== Demographics ==
Historical population
Census	Pop.	Note	%±
1860	176		—
1900	1,192		—
1910	1,296		8.7%
1920	859		−33.7%
1930	1,664		93.7%
1940	1,863		12.0%
1950	1,810		−2.8%
1960	1,714		−5.3%
1970	1,638		−4.4%
1980	1,650		0.7%
1990	1,566		−5.1%
2000	2,162		38.1%
2010	2,390		10.5%
2020	2,508		4.9%
U.S. Decennial Census

=== 2020 census ===
As of the 2020 census, Brewster had a population of 2,508. The median age was 35.3 years. 24.2% of residents were under the age of 18 and 10.2% of residents were 65 years of age or older. For every 100 females there were 139.1 males, and for every 100 females age 18 and over there were 137.2 males age 18 and over.

100.0% of residents lived in urban areas, while 0.0% lived in rural areas.

There were 885 households in Brewster, of which 39.0% had children under the age of 18 living in them. Of all households, 33.4% were married-couple households, 32.8% were households with a male householder and no spouse or partner present, and 24.9% were households with a female householder and no spouse or partner present. About 32.0% of all households were made up of individuals and 10.5% had someone living alone who was 65 years of age or older.

There were 941 housing units, of which 6.0% were vacant. The homeowner vacancy rate was 3.7% and the rental vacancy rate was 3.4%.

Racial composition as of the 2020 census
Race	Number	Percent
White	929	37.0%
Black or African American	93	3.7%
American Indian and Alaska Native	55	2.2%
Asian	58	2.3%
Native Hawaiian and Other Pacific Islander	1	0.0%
Some other race	813	32.4%
Two or more races	559	22.3%
Hispanic or Latino (of any race)	1,542	61.5%

== Schools ==
- Brewster Central School District
  - Brewster High School
  - Henry H. Wells Middle School
  - C. V. Starr Intermediate School
  - John F. Kennedy Elementary School
- Private schools
  - Longview School
  - Saint Lawrence O'Toole

== Government ==
Brewster is in New York's 17th Congressional District, which has been represented by Mike Lawler since 2023. The city is represented in the U.S. Senate by Kirsten Gillibrand and Chuck Scuhmer and by Peter Harckham and Matt Slater in the New York State Legislature. James Schoenig has been the city's mayor since 2007.

- Putnam County Executive Kevin Byrne since 2022
- Putnam County Legislator Paul E. Jonke (District 6) since 2017
- Putnam County Legislator Joseph F. Castellano (District 7) since 2013
- Village Trustees: Christine Piccini, George Gaspar, Tom Boissonnault, Mary Bryde

== Notable people ==
=== Athletes ===
- Mclain Ward (born 1975), equestrian
- Shayna Levy (born 1997), Israeli soccer player

=== Entertainers ===
- Billy Jones (1889–1940), singer
- Marian Anderson (1897–1993), contralto singer
- Glenda Farrell (1904–1971), actress
- Herbert Gehr (1910–1983), American TV director and photographer
- Donald Symington (1925–2013), actor
- Ava Fabian (born 1962), model and actress
- Joe Rubbo (born 1963), actor and TV producer
- Michael Imperioli (born 1966), actor, screenwriter, TV producer and musician

=== Writers and artists ===
- Fanny Crosby (1820–1915), hymnodist, blind activist and minister
- Max Dreyfus (1874–1964), music publisher and songwriter
- Edith Diehl (1876–1953), bookbinder and author
- Chester Beach (1881–1956), sculptor
- Rex Stout (1886–1975), writer
- Trude Fleischmann (1895–1990), photographer
- Pola Stout (1902–1984), designer
- Dorothy Fields (1905–1974), lyricist and librettist
- John Bernard Myers (1920–1987), art dealer and writer
- Norman Laliberté (1925–2021), artist
- Joanne Dobson (born 1942), novelist

=== Political Figures ===
- Charles F. Murphy (1875–1934), politician, lawyer and former NY State Senator
- Willis H. Stephens (1925–2024), politician
- Bob Perciasepe (born 1957), environmental policy leader
- Willis Stephens (born 1955), politician

=== Media Personalities ===
- Evelyn Irons (1900–2000), journalist
- Diana Vreeland (1903–1989), fashion editor

=== Sports Coaches ===
- Ed Farrell (born 1934), American football coach
- Chris Palmer (born 1949), American football coach
- Kevin Leighton (born 1979), American baseball coach and former player

=== Military Figures ===
- Enoch Crosby (1750–1835), American spy and soldier
- John McCloy (1875–1945), Lieutenant commander and a United States Navy Medal of Honor recipient
- Thomas P. Maguire (1947–2024), Adjutant General of New York

=== Business Figure ===
- C.V. Starr(1892-1968), Founder of AIG group

== In popular culture ==
Brewster is the hometown of the leading character (Ann Marie) in the American television sitcom That Girl. Ann is played by Marlo Thomas. She moves from Brewster to New York City.

Portrait photographs of Bruce Springsteen, to accompany his album Nebraska, were shot by photographer David Michael Kennedy at his family home in Brewster, NY, in June 1982. Only one photograph from that shoot was used in the final Nebraska package; however, a broader selection was published by Springsteen as press resources to accompany the release of the Nebraska ‘82: Expanded Edition in October 2025.
