= Kunkel =

Kunkel is a surname, also spelled Künkel, for Slovak women Kunkelová. Notable people with the surname include:

Politics

- George Kunkel (politician) (1893–1965), American lawyer and politician from Pennsylvania
- Jacob Michael Kunkel (1822–1870), US Congressman from Maryland
- John C. Kunkel (1898–1970), US Congressman from Pennsylvania
- John Christian Kunkel (1816–1870), US Congressman from Pennsylvania
- Marie-Sophie Künkel (born 1992), German politician

Science

- Fritz Künkel (1889–1956), German-American psychoanalyst
- Henry Kunkel (1916–1983), American immunologist
- Johann von Löwenstern-Kunckel (1630–1703), German chemist
- Louis M. Kunkel (born 1949), American geneticist
- Louis Otto Kunkel (1884–1960), American botanist

Performing arts

- George Kunkel (theatre manager), minstrel show performer and entertainer
- George Kunkel (actor, born 1866), silent film actor and opera singer
- Marie Kunkel Zimmerman, soprano
- Charles and Jacob Kunkel, musicians and music publishers in Missouri

Sports

- Adam Kunkel (born 1981), Canadian hurdler
- Anna Kunkel (1932–2006), American baseball player
- Bill Kunkel (baseball) (1936–1985), American baseball pitcher and umpire
- Jeff Kunkel (born 1961), American baseball shortstop
- Karl-Heinz Kunkel (1926–1994), German footballer
- Kristina Kunkel (born 1984), American water polo player
- Monika Kunkelová (born 1977), Slovak wheelchair curler, 2014 and 2018 Winter Paralympian
- Paul Kunkel (1903–1977), American tennis player
- Peter Kunkel (born 1956), German footballer
- Rachelle Kunkel (born 1978), American diver
- Rainer Künkel (born 1950), German footballer

Other

- Benjamin Kunkel (born 1972), American novelist and political economist
- Bill Kunkel (journalist) (1950–2011), American executive editor of Electronic Games Magazine
- Bruce Kunkel, former member of the Nitty Gritty Dirt Band
- Leah Kunkel (born 1948), American singer, songwriter, and attorney
- Mike Kunkel, American cartoonist
- Renata Kunkel (born 1954), Polish composer
- Russ Kunkel (born 1948), American drummer and producer
- Thomas Kunkel (born 1955), American author, journalist, and educator
- Thor Kunkel (born 1963), German author

== See also ==
People

- John Kunkel Small (1869–1938), American botanist

Places

- Elizabeth Kunkel House, historic site in Martinsburg, West Virginia, United States
- Kunkel Gallery at the Whitaker Center for Science and the Arts in Harrisburg, Pennsylvania, United States
- Kunkels Pass, mountain pass in Switzerland

Other

- Kunkle (disambiguation)
