= J. Donald Capra =

American immunologist (1937–2015)

- Education: University of Vermont
- Scientific career
- Fields: Immunology
- Workplaces: The Oklahoma Medical Research Foundation, UT Southwestern

J. (Joseph) Donald Capra (1937 – February 24, 2015) was an American immunologist, physician-scientist, and the fourth full-time president (1997–2007) and later, president emeritus, of the Oklahoma Medical Research Foundation (OMRF) in Oklahoma City, Oklahoma. While president, he helped to raise over $100 million and spearheaded major research growth in grants funded and faculty recruited to the institution.

Prior to becoming the president of OMRF in 1997, Capra served as professor of microbiology and internal medicine and was named the Edwin L. Cox Distinguished Chair in Immunology and Genetics at the University of Texas Southwestern Medical Center in Dallas, Texas, from 1974 to 1997, also serving as the director of the UTSW Molecular Immunology Center from 1990 to 1997. Before moving to UT Southwestern, he was a faculty member of the Mt. Sinai School of Medicine in New York City between 1969 and 1974.

Capra is widely known for his studies of monoclonal antibodies. His contributions to immunology have focused on the molecular features of antibody variable regions, including key discoveries related to the antibody combining site and its relationship to antibody idiotypy and the hypervariable regions of antibody molecules. He particularly studied the antibody combining sites and mutational genetics as they apply to both diseased and healthy states. Capra was an early leader in using human monoclonal antibodies from patients with lymphocytic malignancies helping to drive the field towards biopharmaceutical therapeutics, which now represents one of the largest segments of the pharmaceutical, diagnostic and research-based industries. He was also involved in the development of mouse monoclonal antibodies directed against human tissues that are widely used as diagnostic reagents. He was among those who defined the subsets of human B lymphocytes. These studies led to a redefinition of many human B cell malignancies, which became important in the treatment of many Non-Hodgkin’s Lymphomas. He also co-authored a series of papers which utilized human plasmablasts after immunization to define the human immune response to influenza vaccine and generated human monoclonal antibodies from the blood. These studies led to a single cell FACS-sorting based technology for the generation of monoclonal antibodies.

Capra authored more than 320 peer-reviewed scientific articles. He co-authored/edited two books: The Antibody Enigma (1984) and Immunobiology 4th Edition (1999), co-edited seven volumes on The Antibodies with Maurizio Zanetti (1995–2002), and served on the review and editorial boards of many journals. He also served on the board of directors for Innexus Biotechnology Inc. in Scottsdale, Arizona., and the scientific advisory board of AssureImmune, LLC in Boca Raton, Florida. He also served on state agencies, including chairing the scientific advisory panel for the State of Oklahoma EDGE Initiative.

== Biography ==
A native of Vermont, Capra received his BS in chemistry in 1959 and his MD in 1963 from the University of Vermont in Burlington. At his graduation from the UVM College of Medicine in 1963, Capra received the William Brown Alumni Prize, named for a former dean of the College of Medicine, and the UVM Century Award. He interned at St. Luke’s Hospital in New York City between 1963 and 1969. He followed with postdoctoral fellowships at the National Institutes of Health with Dr. Alan Peterkofsky studying methyl deficient transfer RNA, and later, was a guest investigator and assistant physician under Dr. Henry Kunkel at The Rockefeller University in New York City between 1967 and 1969.

Capra is a founding member of the Henry Kunkel Society, a scientific organization dedicated to human disease research in the memory of its namesake. It is made up of some of the world’s leading immunologists and physician researchers. Capra has served several positions with the organization including serving as vice president, president and past president.

Capra has also been associated and/or trained many of today's immunologists, including Mike Carroll Ph.D., professor of pediatrics, Harvard Medical School, Jeff Hanke, executive VP of inflammation/immunology Boehringer Ingelheim, Inaki Sanz, M.D., professor of medicine, chief, Division of Rheumatology, Emory University and Virginia Pascual, M.D., Baylor Institute of Biomedical Studies.

He died on February 24, 2015, following long-term illness.

== Memberships ==
Capra is a member of many scientific and professional organizations, including Sigma Xi, American Association for the Advancement of Science, American Rheumatism Association, American Association of Biological Chemists, American Society for Clinical Investigation, Association of American Physicians, Fellow of the American Association for the Advancement of Science, Honorary Member of the Societe Francaise d' Immunologie, and elected to the Norwegian Academy of Science and Letters. He was elected secretary treasurer of the American Association of Immunologists for 8 years, and served as a council member of the American Society for Clinical Investigation.

== Publications ==
Partial List:

- Willims Jr, R. C.; Kunkel, H. G.; Capra, J. D. (1968). "Antigenic specificities related to the cold agglutinin activity of gamma M globulins". Science. 161 (3839): 379–381. Bibcode:1968Sci...161..379W. doi:10.1126/science.161.3839.379. PMID 4173573. S2CID 38189320.
- Capra, J. D.; Kehoe, J. M. (1975). "Hypervariable Regions, Idiotypy, and the Antibody-Combining Site". Advances in Immunology Volume 20. Vol. 20. pp. 1–40. doi:10.1016/S0065-2776(08)60205-9. ISBN 9780120224203. PMID 47218.
- Ugolini, V.; Nunez, G.; Smith, R. G.; Stastny, P.; Capra, J. D. (1980). "Initial characterization of monoclonal antibodies against human monocytes". Proceedings of the National Academy of Sciences of the United States of America. 77 (11): 6764–6768. Bibcode:1980PNAS...77.6764U. doi:10.1073/pnas.77.11.6764. PMC 350369. PMID 6935683.
- Hurley, C. K.; Shaw, S.; Nadler, L.; Schlossman, S.; Capra, J. D. (1982). "Alpha and beta chains of SB and DR antigens are structurally distinct". The Journal of Experimental Medicine. 156 (5): 1557–1562. doi:10.1084/jem.156.5.1557. PMC 2186837. PMID 6182264.
- Giles, R. C.; Nunez, G.; Hurley, C. K.; Nunez-Roldan, A.; Winchester, R.; Stastny, P.; Capra, J. D. (1983). "Structural analysis of a human I-A homologue using a monoclonal antibody that recognizes an MB3-like specificity". The Journal of Experimental Medicine. 157 (5): 1461–1470. doi:10.1084/jem.157.5.1461. PMC 2187005. PMID 6189938.
- Sanz, I.; Capra, J. D. (1987). "V kappa and J kappa gene segments of A/J Ars-A antibodies: Somatic recombination generates the essential arginine at the junction of the variable and joining regions". Proceedings of the National Academy of Sciences of the United States of America. 84 (4): 1085–1089. Bibcode:1987PNAS...84.1085S. doi:10.1073/pnas.84.4.1085. PMC 304366. PMID 3103124.
- Baisch, J. M.; Weeks, T.; Giles, R.; Hoover, M.; Stastny, P.; Capra, J. D. (1990). "Analysis of HLA-DQ Genotypes and Susceptibility in Insulin-Dependent Diabetes Mellitus". New England Journal of Medicine. 322 (26): 1836–1841. doi:10.1056/NEJM199006283222602. PMID 2348836.
- Hasemann, C. A.; Capra, J. D. (1990). "High-level production of a functional immunoglobulin heterodimer in a baculovirus expression system". Proceedings of the National Academy of Sciences of the United States of America. 87 (10): 3942–3946. Bibcode:1990PNAS...87.3942H. doi:10.1073/pnas.87.10.3942. PMC 54020. PMID 2111022.
- Pascual, V.; Capra, J. D. (1991). "Human Immunoglobulin Heavy-Chain Variable Region Genes: Organization, Polymorphism, and Expression". Advances in Immunology Volume 49. Vol. 49. pp. 1–74. doi:10.1016/S0065-2776(08)60774-9. ISBN 9780120224494. PMID 1906675.
- Pascual, V.; Victor, K.; Lelsz, D.; Spellerberg, M. B.; Hamblin, T. J.; Thompson, K. M.; Randen, I.; Natvig, J.; Capra, J. D.; Stevenson, F. K. (1991). "Nucleotide sequence analysis of the V regions of two IgM cold agglutinins. Evidence that the VH4-21 gene segment is responsible for the major cross-reactive idiotype". Journal of Immunology. 146 (12): 4385–4391. doi:10.4049/jimmunol.146.12.4385. PMID 1710250. S2CID 25732693.
- Pascual, V.; Liu, Y. J.; Magalski, A.; De Bouteiller, O.; Banchereau, J.; Capra, J. D. (1994). "Analysis of somatic mutation in five B cell subsets of human tonsil". The Journal of Experimental Medicine. 180 (1): 329–339. doi:10.1084/jem.180.1.329. PMC 2191579. PMID 8006591.
- Denépoux, S.; Razanajaona, D.; Blanchard, D.; Meffre, G.; Capra, J. D.; Banchereau, J.; Lebecque, S. (1997). "Induction of somatic mutation in a human B cell line in vitro". Immunity. 6 (1): 35–46. doi:10.1016/S1074-7613(00)80240-X. PMID 9052835.
- Wilson, P. C.; Bouteiller, O.; Liu, Y. J.; Potter, K.; Banchereau, J.; Capra, J. D.; Pascual, V. (1998). "Somatic hypermutation introduces insertions and deletions into immunoglobulin V genes". The Journal of Experimental Medicine. 187 (1): 59–70. doi:10.1084/jem.187.1.59. PMC 2199186. PMID 9419211.
- Wilson, P. C.; Wilson, K.; Liu, Y. J.; Banchereau, J.; Pascual, V.; Capra, J. D. (2000). "Receptor revision of immunoglobulin heavy chain variable region genes in normal human B lymphocytes". The Journal of Experimental Medicine. 191 (11): 1881–1894. doi:10.1084/jem.191.11.1881. PMC 2213516. PMID 10839804.
- Wrammert, J.; Smith, K.; Miller, J.; Langley, W. A.; Kokko, K.; Larsen, C.; Zheng, N. Y.; Mays, I.; Garman, L.; Helms, C.; James, J.; Air, G. M.; Capra, J. D.; Ahmed, R.; Wilson, P. C. (2008). "Rapid cloning of high-affinity human monoclonal antibodies against influenza virus". Nature. 453 (7195): 667–671. Bibcode:2008Natur.453..667W. doi:10.1038/nature06890. PMC 2515609. PMID 18449194.
