= Croton-on-Hudson, New York =

- Village
- Village of Croton-on-Hudson
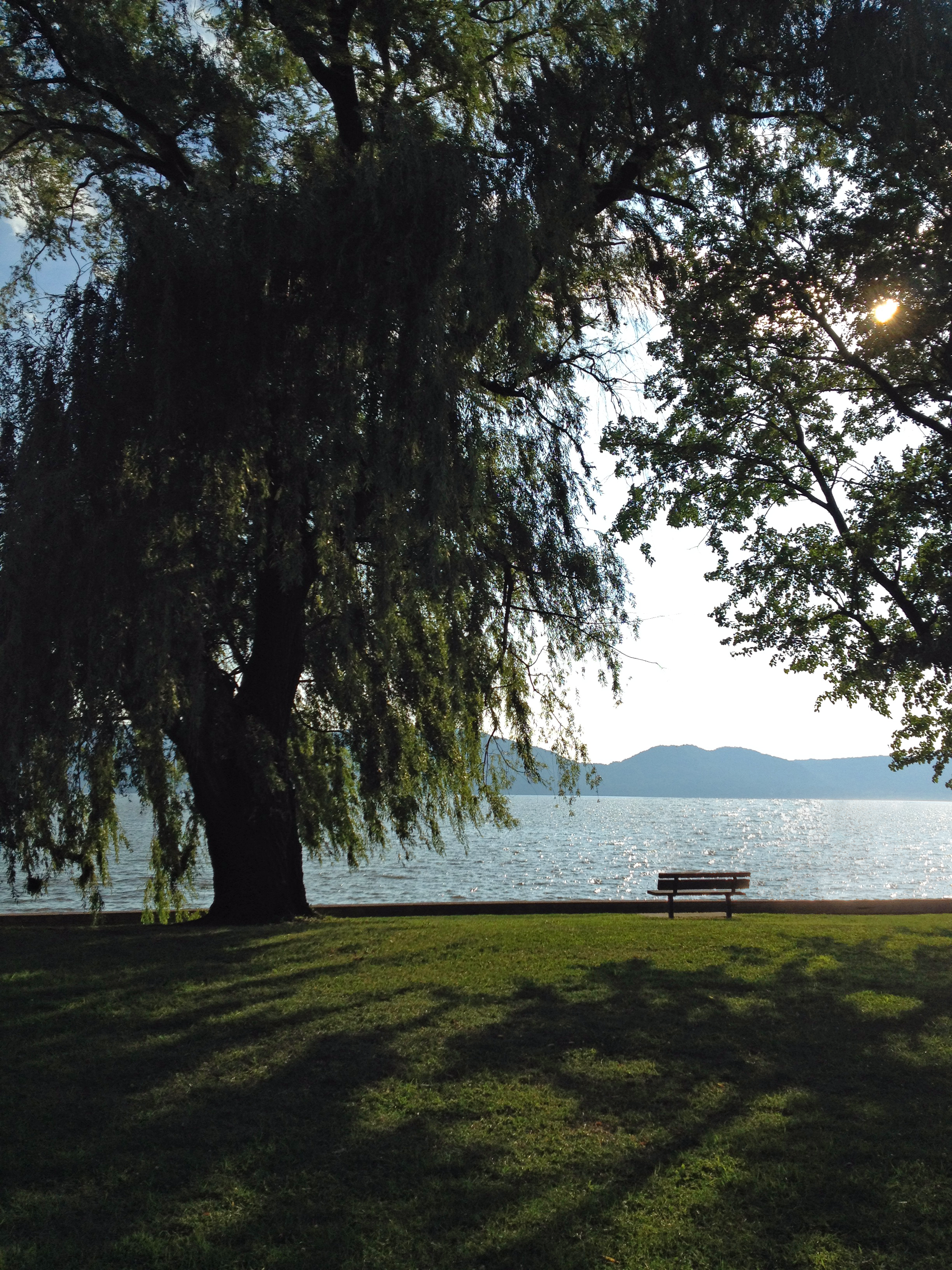
- View from Croton Point Park

- Flag Seal

- Location of Croton-on-Hudson, New York
- Coordinates: 41°12′15″N 73°53′10″W
- Country: United States
- State: New York
- County: Westchester
- Town: Cortlandt

Government
  - Mayor: Brian Pugh (D)

Area
  - Total: 10.75 sq mi (27.85 km^{2})
  - Land: 4.70 sq mi (12.16 km^{2})
  - Water: 6.06 sq mi (15.70 km^{2})
- Elevation: 164 ft (50 m)

Population (2020)
  - Total: 8,327
  - Density: 1,774.2/sq mi (685.03/km^{2})
  - Demonym: Crotonite
- Time zone: UTC-5 (Eastern (EST))
  - Summer (DST): UTC-4 (EDT)
- ZIP codes: 10520-10521
- Area code: 914
- FIPS code: 36-19213
- GNIS feature ID: 0947832
- Website: www.crotononhudson-ny.gov

Croton-on-Hudson (/kroʊtɪn/ KROH-tin) is a village in Westchester County, New York, United States. The population was 8,327 at the 2020 United States census over 8,070 at the 2010 census. It is located in the town of Cortlandt as part of New York City's northern suburbs. The village was incorporated in 1898.

== History ==
Humans have lived in the area that would become Croton-on-Hudson since at least 7000 BC. The Kitchawanc tribe, part of the Wappinger Confederacy of the Algonquian peoples, signed a peace treaty with the newly arriving Dutch people at Croton Point in 1645, now commemorated by a plaque in the park there.

Stephanus van Cortlandt began acquiring land in the area to build a manor in 1677, the same year he became mayor of New York City. It was granted by royal patent in 1697 as the Manor of Cortlandt, including the area known as Croton Landing where the Croton River meets the Hudson River, where the manor house was built. A 1718 census reported 91 inhabitants, including Dutch settlers and English Quakers. People worked the manor primarily as farmers or millers.

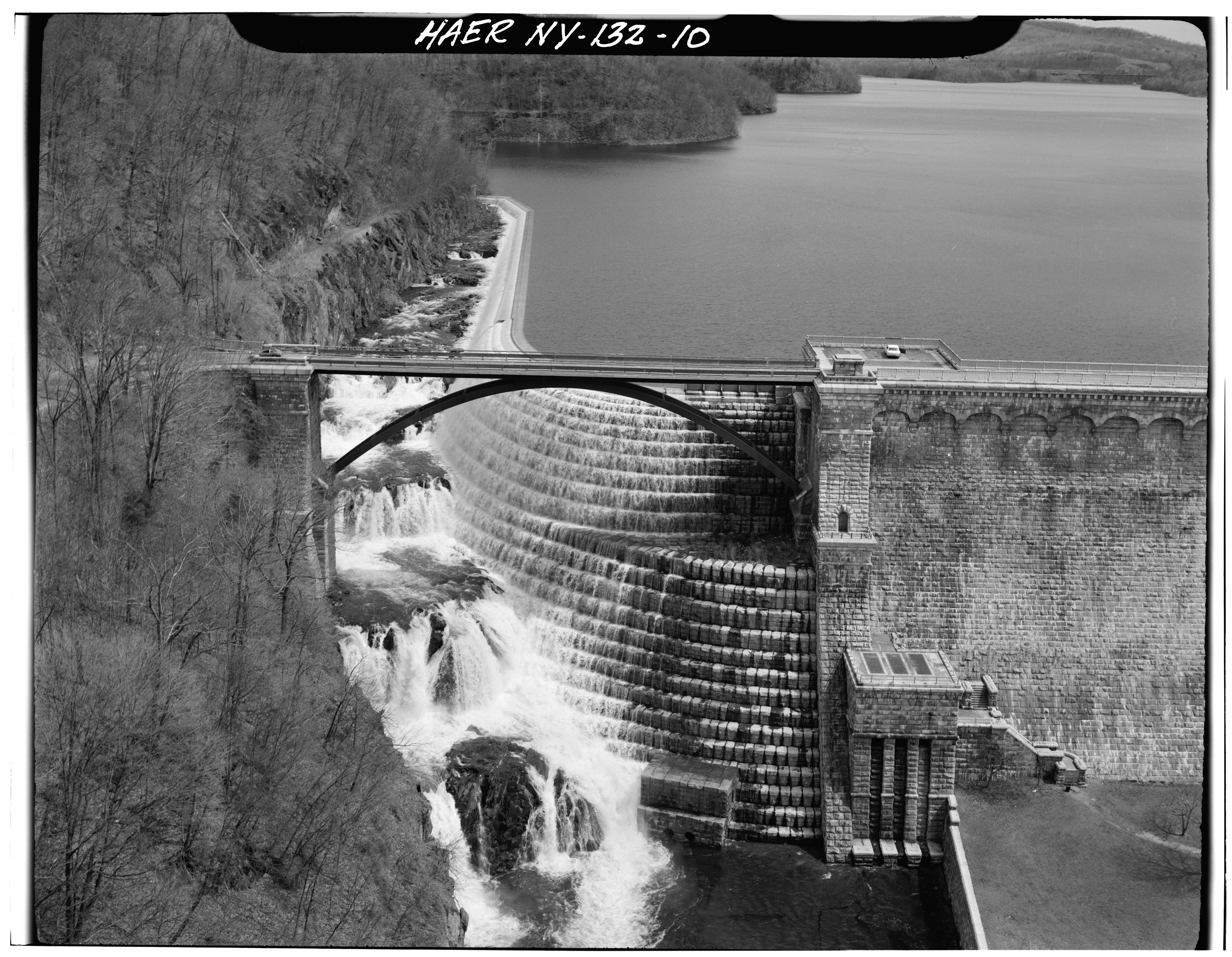
New Croton Dam and Reservoir, Croton River, Croton-on-Hudson, NY

In the mid- to late 1800s first the Croton Dam, then the New Croton Dam, and the Croton Aqueduct were built on the Croton River to supply New York City, along with the New York Central Railroad station on the Hudson River. Many Irish, Italian and German immigrants moved to the area to work on those projects, increasing the population dramatically. By 1898, when the Village incorporated, the population was 1,000 people, growing to 1,700 people in the early 1900s.

In 1846, work began on a Hudson River rail line from Poughkeepsie to New York City. Clifford Harmon, a realtor, purchased 550 acres of land next to the village of Croton in 1903. He gave part of the land to the New York Central Railroad to build a train station, on the condition that the station would forever be named after him. Today it is called the Croton-Harmon station of the Metro-North Railroad and of Amtrak. In 1906, the station became a major service facility for the railroad. The station expanded even further in 1913, when it became the stop at which electric trains from New York City switched to steam engines. The station still serves this purpose, but for diesel locomotives instead of steam engines.

Harmon thrived as an artist's colony alongside the village, while the neighboring Mount Airy community evolved from Quakers to Greenwich Village artists and writers by the early 1900s. Mount Airy was home to many early members of the American Communist Party. In 1932 Harmon and most of Mount Airy were incorporated into the village.

== Geography ==
Croton-on-Hudson is located at 41°12′15″N 73°53′10″W (41.204228, -73.886177) on the shores of the Hudson River. The zip codes are 10520 and 10521.

According to the United States Census Bureau, the village has a total area of 10.8 square miles (28.0 km^{2}), of which 4.8 square miles (12.4 km^{2}) is land and 6.1 square miles (15.8 km^{2}), or 56.06%, is water.

== Demographics ==
Historical population
Census	Pop.	Note	%±
1900	1,533		—
1910	1,806		17.8%
1920	2,286		26.6%
1930	2,447		7.0%
1940	3,843		57.0%
1950	4,837		25.9%
1960	6,812		40.8%
1970	7,523		10.4%
1980	6,889		−8.4%
1990	7,018		1.9%
2000	7,606		8.4%
2010	8,070		6.1%
2020	8,327		3.2%
U.S. Decennial Census

=== 2020 census ===
As of the 2020 census, Croton-on-Hudson had a population of 8,327. The median age was 44.5 years. 23.6% of residents were under the age of 18 and 18.9% of residents were 65 years of age or older. For every 100 females there were 92.8 males, and for every 100 females age 18 and over there were 89.7 males age 18 and over.

99.7% of residents lived in urban areas, while 0.3% lived in rural areas.

There were 3,056 households in Croton-on-Hudson, of which 38.6% had children under the age of 18 living in them. Of all households, 61.1% were married-couple households, 11.8% were households with a male householder and no spouse or partner present, and 22.1% were households with a female householder and no spouse or partner present. About 19.4% of all households were made up of individuals and 10.1% had someone living alone who was 65 years of age or older.

There were 3,179 housing units, of which 3.9% were vacant. The homeowner vacancy rate was 0.8% and the rental vacancy rate was 3.8%.

Racial composition as of the 2020 census
Race	Number	Percent
White	6,257	75.1%
Black or African American	241	2.9%
American Indian and Alaska Native	25	0.3%
Asian	378	4.5%
Native Hawaiian and Other Pacific Islander	0	0.0%
Some other race	543	6.5%
Two or more races	883	10.6%
Hispanic or Latino (of any race)	1,265	15.2%

=== 2000 census ===
As of the 2000 census, there were 7,606 people, 2,798 households, and 2,050 families residing in the village. The population density was 1,601.7 inhabitants per square mile (618.4/km^{2}). There were 2,859 housing units at an average density of 602.1 per square mile (232.5/km^{2}). The racial makeup of the village was 91.5% white, 1.9% African American, 0.26% Native American, 2.06% Asian, 0.01% Pacific Islander, 2.58% from other races, and 1.70% from two or more races. Hispanic or Latino of any race were 6.93% of the population.

There were 2,798 households, out of which 38.7% had children under the age of 18 living with them, 62.5% were married couples living together, 8.2% had a female householder with no husband present, and 26.7% were non-families. 22.2% of all households were made up of individuals, and 7.7% had someone living alone who was 65 years of age or older. The average household size was 2.65 and the average family size was 3.11.

In the village, the population was spread out, with 25.7% under the age of 18, 4.5% from 18 to 24, 30.1% from 25 to 44, 26.1% from 45 to 64, and 13.6% who were 65 years of age or older. The median age was 40 years. For every 100 females, there were 90.8 males. For every 100 females age 18 and over, there were 86.7 males.

=== Income and poverty ===
The median income for a household in the village was $150,260, and the median income for a family was $250,000+.

== Economy ==
Croton-on-Hudson's economy has historically thrived on the Metro-North train station that up until the early 1980s served as the point at which northbound trains would exchange their electric engines for other modes of conveyance. During those days, the train station and its super-adjacent area was known as Harmon. Because maintenance of diesel and steam engines was then very labor-intensive, there were many workers whose needs were served by abundant service businesses, such as restaurants and bars. Because of the separate development of both the Harmon and the Mt. Airy communities, there were originally two commercial districts—one centered on Grand Street, and the other in Harmon—though in recent years the two have merged into a single sprawling commercial district. There is also a North Riverside commercial district serving communities along Riverside Drive, Brook Street, Grand Street, and Bank Street.

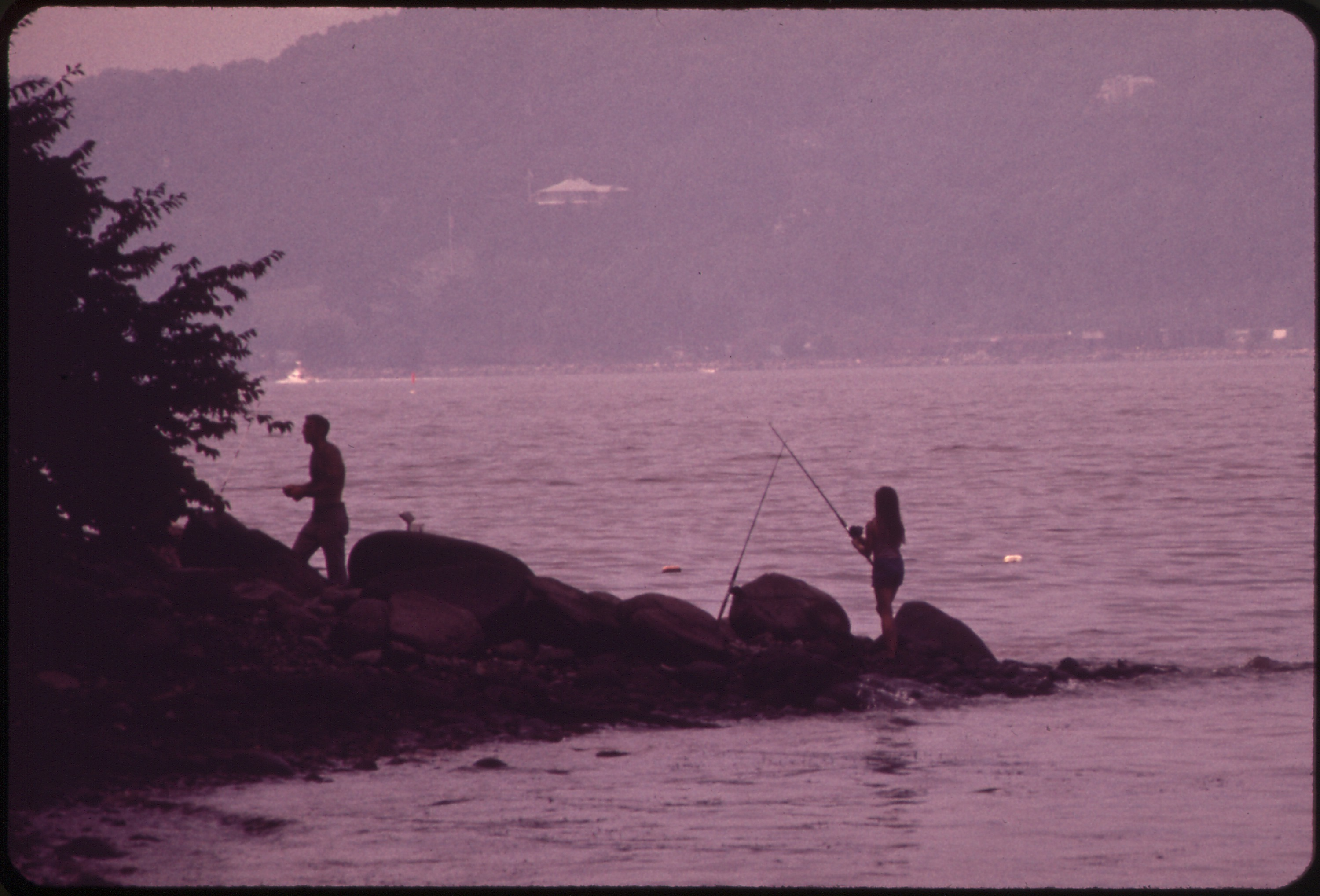
A man and woman fishing in Croton Point Park

After the New York Central Railroad folded into Penn Central in 1968, Croton-on-Hudson's economy slowly stagnated. Although Croton-Harmon station still served as the main transfer point northbound between local and express trains, the laborers who had earlier fueled a bustling service economy were no longer present in Harmon. The exodus of labor during the early 1970s was compounded by the stagflation that was a result of higher oil prices and skyrocketing interest rates.

There has been an ongoing effort since the early 1990s to develop the riverfront for recreational use. Among the accomplishments are a pedestrian bridge spanning U.S. Route 9 and NY 9A between the lower village and Senasqua Park, the Crossining pedestrian footbridge across the Croton River, the bicycle trail extensions around Half Moon Bay Condominiums, rehabilitation of the "Picture Tunnel" (repaving and closing it to cars), and acquisition and clearing of the Croton Landing property. In addition, Croton Point Park is also along the riverfront.

== Arts and culture ==
Dummy light at the intersection of Grand Street and Old Post Road.

Croton Point Park hosts the Clearwater Festival, an annual folk music, art and environmental festival.

Summerfest is an annual event featuring music, food, and artists.

The Harry Chapin Run Against Hunger is an annual 10k race founded in 1981.

Founded in 2005, The Blaze is an annual pumpkin carving contest at Van Cortlandt Manor.

The Asbury United Methodist Church and Bethel Chapel and Cemetery, Croton North Railroad Station, and St. Augustine's Episcopal Church Complex are listed on the National Register of Historic Places. Van Cortlandt Manor is listed as a National Historic Landmark.

From the 1910s to the 1960s, Croton was a popular location for the summer homes of American communists, socialists and other radicals and many important artists and writers. This gave the Mt. Airy area in Croton the nickname "Red Hill".

Croton-on-Hudson is the original location of the Hudson Institute, a Cold War think tank where the "Mutual Assured Destruction" strategy for nuclear war deterrence was developed.

A dummy light—a traffic signal located in the centre of an intersection—has been located in downtown Croton-on-Hudson since the 1920s.

== Parks and recreation ==
Parks and sites of interest in the community include:

- Croton Dam on the Croton River overlooks the New Croton Reservoir that it creates (outside the village limits in the Town of Cortlandt).
- Croton Point Park is a 508-acre county park on a large peninsula in the Tappan Zee segment of the Hudson River.
- Van Cortlandt Manor is a National Historic Landmark established at the mouth of the Croton River at the Hudson River on the Tappan Zee.
- Jane E. Lytle Memorial Croton Arboretum conserves over 20 acres of wetlands and woods.
- Brinton Brook Sanctuary is Saw Mill River Audubon's largest sanctuary, covering 156 acres and offering over three miles of hiking trails through a variety of habitats.
- Croton Landing Park is a 12.2-acre park containing a 2/3 mile scenic walkway along the Hudson River. The walkway ends at a 9/11 memorial built around a beam from the World Trade Center.
- Senasqua Park is a 4.6-acre Hudson River waterfront park containing a sailing school and playground, with walkways to Croton Point and Croton Landing Park.
- Silver Lake Park is a 13.5-acre park with a beach along the Croton River with trails to Carrie E. Tompkins elementary school (CET) and the north tip of Cleveland Drive.
- Black Rock Park is a 10.5-acre park on the Croton River, near New York State Route 129 (NY 129), within a mile or so of the Croton Dam, used mostly for fly fishing and picnics. It is within 100 yards of a historic bridge which dates from the 1800s on Quaker Hill Road.
- Mayo's Landing is a 1.1-acre park along the Croton River.
- Paradise Island Park is a 22.2-acre undeveloped island in the Croton River.
- Croton-on-Hudson section of Westchester RiverWalk features interpretive signage describing the ecology, culture, and history of the area.

== Government ==
Brian Pugh was elected mayor in 2017.

== Education ==
Most of the village is in Croton-Harmon Union Free School District, while a portion of the village is in the Hendrick Hudson Central School District (HHSD). Hendrick Hudson High School is the latter district's comprehensive high school.

== Media ==
- Croton-on-Hudson Newsletter, Village of Croton-on-Hudson
- The Gazette
- The Northern Westchester Examiner
- The Croton Chronicle

== Infrastructure ==
=== Transportation ===
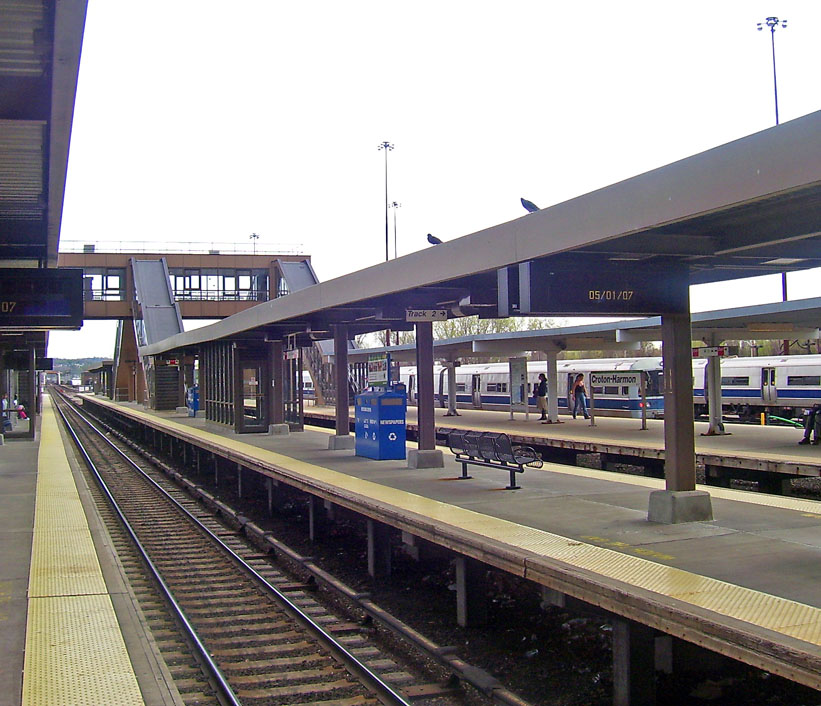
Croton-Harmon Train Station

The town is a stop for Amtrak's Empire Service, Adirondack, Maple Leaf, Ethan Allen Express, and Lake Shore Limited routes, as well the MTA's Metro-North Hudson Line service, both at the Croton-Harmon station. Metro-North's main shops and yards are also located here.

Croton-on-Hudson is served by US 9, NY 9A, and NY 129.

== Notable people ==
- Alan Abelson, financial writer for Barron's
- Guy Adami
- Manny Albam, composer, arranger, RCA and Solid State Records
- Frances E. Allen, computer scientist, seminal work in compilers, program optimization, and parallel computing
- Kristen Anderson-Lopez, American film and stage lyricist
- Nenad Bach
- Isabel Chapin Barrows, physician, ophthalmologist, professor, congressional stenographer – many "first woman as" achievements
- Helen Purdy Beale, "mother of plant virology and serology", inventor of standard serology tools used in scientific research and medical diagnosis
- Charles H. Bennett
- George Biddle
- Ramon Bloomberg, artist and music video director
- Louise Bryant
- Alexander Calder, artist
- Isadora Duncan, ballet dancer
- The Dude of Life, musician and lyricist
- Crystal Eastman
- Max Eastman
- Irving Fierstein, American impressionist painter and designer
- Carl Folta, Viacom executive
- Allen Funt
- William Gaddis
- Josh Greenfeld
- Hananiah Harari, American modernist painter and illustrator
- Mary Hamilton, activist
- Robb Hanrahan
- Lorraine Hansberry, playwright and author
- Lee Elhardt Hays
- Lawrence R. Jacobs, American political scientist
- Joseph Heller
- Sally Jacobsen, first woman as international editor of the Associated Press
- Stephen Jardine
- Herman Kahn
- Roger Kahn, author of The Boys of Summer
- Ira Kaplan, songwriter and lead guitarist for Yo La Tengo
- Herbert Keppler
- Thanhha Lai, children's author
- Kenneth C. Laudon, professor of information systems
- Scott Levine, astronomy author and communicator known for his work with BBC Sky at Night Magazine, Sky and Telescope, EarthSky and other outlets.
- Jeff McCarthy
- Audra McDonald
- John Mearsheimer
- Richard Merkin, American painter and illustrator
- Edna St. Vincent Millay
- Ward Morehouse
- Jessye Norman
- Elmar Oliveira
- Jerry Pinkney, a Caldecott award-winning children's book illustrator
- John Silas Reed
- Michael Robinson (rabbi), activist for civil rights and human rights
- Darlene Rodriguez
- Edward Rondthaler
- Thomas Secunda, co-founder and vice-chairman of Bloomberg L.P.
- Gordon Sheer
- Upton Sinclair, author
- Nicholas Springer
- Peter Strauss
- Gloria Swanson, motion picture actress
- Hannah Tompkins, American painter and illustrator
- Joe Vasta
- William Pulleyblank
- Suzyn Waldman, sportscaster
- Donald Wallance

== In popular culture ==
- 30 Rock: The episode "Retreat to Move Forward" from the third season was set in Croton-on-Hudson. The episode features the catchphrase 'what happens in Croton-on-Hudson stays in Croton-on-Hudson.'
- Films shot in Croton-on-Hudson include:
  - Daylight: In the opening sequence, the trucks that end up destroying the tunnel drive through Croton-on-Hudson (the steps of the New Croton Dam are visible) and several other towns in Westchester County, New York
  - Shriek of the Mutilated (1974) (alternate titles: Mutilated, Scream of the Snowbeast)
  - Ganja & Hess
  - Tenderness
  - The Toxic Avenger Part II
  - War of the Worlds: Shot at Croton Point.
  - Madam Secretary 2016, filmed on the Croton River just below Quaker Bridge

== See also ==
- Historic Hudson Valley
- History of Westchester County, New York
