= Louis Kunkel =

Louis Kunkel may refer to:

- Louis M. Kunkel (born 1949), American geneticist
- Louis Otto Kunkel (1884–1960), American plant pathologist
