= Helen Purdy Beale =

American virologist

- Helen Purdy Beale sitting among graduate students at Cornell University in 1919
- Born: Helen Alice Purdy; September 19, 1893; Croton-on-Hudson, New York U.S.
- Died: November 5, 1976 (aged 83); Ridgefield, Connecticut U.S.
- Occupation: Virologist
- Years active: 1919–1976
- Known for: Invention of standard scientific methods

Helen Alice Purdy Beale (September 19, 1893 – November 5, 1976) was an American virologist who made significant contributions to the fields of plant virology and immunology. During her work on Tobacco mosaic virus, Beale invented standard serology tools that are used today in research practices and medical diagnosis. She has been revered as the "mother of plant virology and serology".

== Early life and education ==
Beale was born in Croton-on-Hudson, New York. She attended Ossining School and continued on in 1914 to Barnard College, where she earned her A.B. in botany in 1918. She then attended Cornell University to pursue a Ph.D. in plant pathology at the newly created department of plant pathology.

From 1918 to 1919, Beale worked with Herbert Hice Whetzel, the creator and chair of the department, but after misogynistic discouragement from Whetzel, she postponed completion of the degree. Several years later, in 1925, her principal investigator at the time, Louis O. Kunkel at the Boyce Thompson Institute, encouraged her to resume her graduate studies at Cornell. She returned to Whetzel's lab to work toward her degree. Although she completed her dissertation, Whetzel refused to sign off on her doctorate degree.

In 1927, with encouragement again by Kunkel, Beale resumed pursuit of her Ph.D., this time enrolling in Columbia University in the department of bacteriology. During this time, she learned about cutting-edge techniques in bacteriology and serology from Fredrick Parker Gay, and about immunologic tools in diagnosing human disease from Claus W. Jungeblu. These experiences helped her shape and complete a dissertation on serologic identification of plant viruses, particularly tobacco mosaic virus. Columbia awarded her a doctorate degree in 1929.

== Career ==
From 1919 to 1920 and after postponing her graduate studies at Cornell, Beale was an instructor at Vassar College where she taught biology. After receiving an American-Scandinavian Foundation fellowship, she spent one year at the University of Copenhagen. Upon her return to the United States, she joined the New York City department of health where she worked in the research laboratory of William H. Park, building on her expertise in bacteriology and serology. In 1921 after passing the New York State exam, she became an accredited laboratory assistant in bacteriology and was offered a laboratory assistant position with William A. Murrill at the New York Botanical Gardens studying fungi (mycology) in 1922. Beale was enlisted as a Bishop Museum Fellow in 1923, after which she spent one year in Honolulu at the Hawaiian Sugar Planters' Association.

When she returned to New York in 1924, she applied for, and was accepted to, a position as a plant pathologist at the newly opened the Boyce Thompson Institute that, at the time, was located in Yonkers, New York. She remained at the Boyce Thompson Institute for the bulk of her career, even continuing her research there while she co-currently pursued her graduate studies at Columbia University. With her Ph.D. completed in 1929, she was granted a National Research Council Fellowship and, in addition to her position at the Boyce Thompson Institute, became a research associate in the department of bacteriology at Columbia University.

During her career, Beale was granted funding from the John and Mary R. Markle Foundation (1942–1946) for advancement in serology and from the American Association for the Advancement of Science (1942) "for a study of the photoelectric titration of plant viruses".

In 1948, she was promoted to both plant pathologist at the Boyce Thompson Institute, and to research associate at Columbia University.

Beale retired from these positions in 1952 and began a prolific monograph on plant viruses. The project was well-funded across several sources including the American Tobacco Corporation, the Boyce Thompson Institute, the R. J. Reynolds Tobacco Company, the National Institutes of Health, and the National Library of Medicine. She also received USDA and Agricultural Research Service support. The project concluded with the 1976 publication of her work entitled, Bibliography of Plant Viruses and Index to Research.

== Boyce Thompson Institute for Plant Research ==
Beale joined the Boyce Thompson Institute for Plant Research in 1924 where she remained until her retirement in 1952. She originally joined the virology laboratory of Louis O. Kunkel, whose research focus was on the cause and transmission method of yellows disease in plants.

At the time, tobacco mosaic disease in plants (particularly tobacco plants, and fresh market crops in the same family of plants, such as tomatoes and potatoes) was adversely affecting American agriculture and the economy. The disease was highly infectious and easily spread to a healthy plant, simply by touching the leaf with infected leaf sap. There was great economic pressure to find the cause of tobacco mosaic disease and a way to control it, ensuring continued agricultural production. Key research questions were:

1. Were all cases of tobacco mosaic disease caused by the same infectious agent, or several infectious agents leading to similar disease symptoms?
2. What was(were) the infectious agent(s)?
3. Was there a way to definitively diagnose that a plant had been infected?

=== Research contribution ===
Peter K. Olitsky, at the Rockefeller Institute, had proposed previously that tobacco mosaic disease was caused by a bacterial infection. Setting out to investigate, Beale published a statement that she was "unable to obtain any evidence that the active agent producing mosaic disease in tobacco and tomato plants multiplies outside the living plants", casting suspicion on a bacterial cause. Turning to investigate the leaves of infected plant leaves, Beale developed a bioassay method to track the development of an infection with a 0.5% aqueous solution of iodine green, a revolutionary step in identifying viruses.

Beale's landmark contribution to the application of serology in the field of plant virology precipitated as a result of her dissertation work in 1929. She demonstrated that infected leaf sap injected into rabbits could produce polyclonal antibodies in rabbit antiserum that were not found in the control rabbits (not infected with leaf sap during injections). The antibodies were specific to Tobacco mosaic virus, thus identifying and characterizing the virus as a pathogenic agent in tobacco mosaic disease. The specificity of the antibody for Tobacco mosaic virus, being unreactive with other viruses, proved to be a useful tool with which to diagnose a Tobacco mosaic virus infection. It also allowed for the isolation and characterization of unique strains of Tobacco mosaic virus, making it possible for her collaborator, Wendell M. Stanley, to work with a single pure strain. This increased research precision helped facilitate and accelerate Stanley's contributions to the advancement of the Tobacco mosaic virus field. Furthermore, she demonstrated that Tobacco mosaic virus in leaf sap could be neutralized, or inactivated, by the antibodies isolated from the antiserum. In conclusion, Beale established the basis of using immunology and serology to define the chemical nature of Tobacco mosaic virus that could be expanded and applied to the virology field in general.

== Legacy ==
Helen Purdy Beale's research with Tobacco mosaic virus integrated immunology into the field of plant virology. The serology tools she invented would become standard practices that continue to be used in both research and medical diagnostics.

Her collaborator, W. M. Stanley, has been quoted as stating that Beale possessed the rare quality to "correlate the chemical with the serological work and thus to secure fundamental information regarding viruses in general".

In his recommendation letter Beale's application to the Guggenheim Fellowship, Kunkel wrote "In my opinion Dr. Beale possesses unusual ability as a research worker and as a scholar... She is one of those gifted persons who periodically comes for-ward with a new idea".

== Death ==
Beale died on November 5, 1976, in Ridgefield, Connecticut, where she lived in retirement. Her obituary described her as "unflappable, witty, and persevering".

== Works and publications ==
- Purdy, Helen A.; Walbum, L. E. (1 January 1922). "The Action of Various Metallic Salts on Hemolysis". The Journal of Immunology. 7 (1): 35–45. doi:10.4049/jimmunol.7.1.35. S2CID 83914618.
- Purdy, Helen A. (1 April 1926). "Attempt to Cultivate an Organism from Tomato Mosaic". Botanical Gazette. 81 (2): 210–217. doi:10.1086/333587. S2CID 84810442.
- Purdy, Helen A. (1928). "Multiplication of the Virus of Tobacco Mosaic in Detached Leaves". American Journal of Botany. 15 (1): 94–99. doi:10.2307/2435866. JSTOR 2435866.
- Purdy, Helen A. (1928). "The Improbability of Tobacco Mosaic Transmission by Slugs". American Journal of Botany. 15 (1): 100–101. doi:10.2307/2435867. JSTOR 2435867.
- Purdy, Helen A. (31 May 1929). "Immunologic Reactions with Tobacco Mosaic Virus". The Journal of Experimental Medicine. 49 (6): 919–935. doi:10.1084/jem.49.6.919. PMC 2131595. PMID 19869591.
- Beale, Helen Purdy (30 September 1931). "Specificity of the Precipitin Reaction in Tobacco Mosaic Disease". The Journal of Experimental Medicine. 54 (4): 463–473. doi:10.1084/jem.54.4.463. PMC 2132021. PMID 19869933.
- Weindling, R; Katznelson, H; Beale, H P (October 1950). "Antibiosis in Relation to Plant Diseases". Annual Review of Microbiology. 4 (1): 247–260. doi:10.1146/annurev.mi.04.100150.001335. PMID 14847571.
- Beale, Helen Purdy (1976). Bibliography of Plant Viruses, and Index to Research. Columbia University Press. ISBN 978-0-231-03763-1. OCLC 590106.
