= 25th Pennsylvania Infantry Regiment =

Union Army infantry regiment

25th Pennsylvania Volunteer Infantry
- Active: April 13, 1861 - July 26, 1861
- Country: United States
- Allegiance: Union Army
- Branch: Infantry
- Engagements: American Civil War: Garrison duty in Washington, D.C. and Fort Washington, Maryland (Companies A, B, C, E, and H); Army of the Shenandoah, July 1861 (D, F, G, I, and K)

The 25th Pennsylvania Volunteer Infantry was a Three Months' Service infantry regiment which served with the Union Army during the American Civil War. Composed of Pennsylvania First Defenders, the first five companies of men who responded to President Lincoln's call for 75,000 volunteers to defend the national capital in Washington, D.C. following the Fall of Fort Sumter to Confederate States Army troops in mid-April 1861, and five additional companies of early responders who enlisted later in April 1861.

The 25th regiment's formation was unusual in that its members mustered in at multiple locations and were subsequently divided among various duty stations, including Washington Arsenal, the U.S. Capitol, and Washington Navy Yard in Washington, D.C., and Fort Washington in Maryland before roughly half of the regiment was moved to Rockville, Maryland and assigned to the Union force commanded by Major-General Robert Patterson.

== History ==
First Defenders from Pennsylvania, who later became members of the 25th Pennsylvania Infantry, were quartered in mid-April 1861 at the U.S. Capitol in Washington, D.C., shown here on March 4, 1861.

In anticipation of the call by President Abraham Lincoln for volunteer troops to assist in the defense of the nation's capital following the firing on Fort Sumter by Confederate States forces on April 12, 1861, 476 officers and enlisted men from the communities of Allentown, Lewistown, Pottsville, and Reading, Pennsylvania, who were already active with existing militia units in those communities (the Allen Rifles of Allentown, Logan Guards of Lewistown, National Light Infantry and Washington Infantry of Pottsville, and Ringgold Light Artillery of Reading), began equipping themselves on April 13, and assembled in Harrisburg on April 17, two days after Lincoln issued his proclamation requesting the response of 75,000 volunteers. Administered the oath of service on April 18, 1861 at the railroad station in Harrisburg, they departed aboard Northern Central Railroad boxcars, and arrived at noon at the Bolton Station in Baltimore, Maryland, where they disembarked. After marching two miles to the Camden Station, they boarded a new train and headed for Washington, D.C., where they arrived at 6:00 p.m. Later given the honorific of "First Defenders" in recognition of their prompt action, they were initially stationed in various rooms of the United States House of Representatives and Senate before moving to the U.S. Capitol Building where, at 9:00 p.m. that same evening, they were issued new Springfield rifles and ammunition as Lincoln and key members of his cabinet looked on. Afterward, Lincoln shook the hand of each volunteer.

These "First Defenders" were assigned to the regiment's various units as follows:

- Company A: Ringgold Light Artillery (Reading)
- Company D: Logan Guards (Lewistown)
- Company E: Washington Artillery (Pottsville)
- Company G: National Light Infantry (Pottsville)
- Company H: Allen Rifles (Allentown).

On the same day that these First Defenders were arriving in Washington, the remainder of the regiment, which would ultimately be designated as the 25th Pennsylvania Volunteer Infantry, was being organized in Harrisburg, Pennsylvania by Colonel Henry L. Cake, Lieutenant Colonel John B. Selheimer and Major James H. Campbell. They were then also transported via train to Washington, D.C. by way of Baltimore. Initially assigned to the Department of Washington, Companies A, G and H of the First Defenders (the Ringgold Light Artillery, Logan Guards, and Allen Rifles) were quartered in the U.S. Capitol Building, and assigned to guard the Washington Arsenal and Washington Navy Yard while Companies D and E (the Logan Guard and Washington Artillery) were stationed at Fort Washington. The remainder of the 25th Pennsylvania Volunteer Infantry were assigned to tents, and were also stationed near the arsenal. On May 27, 1861, Companies A, G, and H were also assigned to Cake's command.

These scenes were drawn by artist Alfred Waud in 1864, three years after the 25th Pennsylvania was stationed in Martinsburg, West Virginia.

Companies A and E subsequently remained on duty at the arsenal for the remainder of their service tenure while Companies B, E, and H spent the remainder of their service tenure on garrison duty at Fort Washington. Companies D, F, G, I, and K, which had been placed under the command of Lieutenant Colonel Selheimer, were marched to Rockville, Maryland from June 29 to 30, 1861 and, upon their arrival, were attached to the command of Colonel Charles P. Stone. On July 1, they were ordered to Poolesville, from where they moved to Sandy Hook opposite Harper's Ferry, at which point Colonel Cake resumed command. Still assigned to Stone's command, they marched for Martinsburg, West Virginia from July 6 to 8, and were attached to Stone's 7th Brigade in the 3rd Division under Major-General Charles W. Sandford, which was part of the Department of Pennsylvania and the U.S. Army of the Shenandoah headed by Robert Patterson. On July 15, they advanced to Bunker Hill. From July 17 to 23, they made camp near Harper's Ferry.

On July 23, all of the companies which made up the 25th Pennsylvania departed from their respective duty stations, and made their way back, by train, to Harrisburg, where they began to be honorably mustered out through August 1. Many of the members of this regiment then reenlisted for additional service terms with the 96th Pennsylvania Infantry.

== Notable members ==
- William Auman: A private with Company B, 25th Pennsylvania, Auman rose through the ranks to be brevetted as a captain with the 48th Pennsylvania "for gallant and meritorious services before Petersburg, Virginia", and be promoted to major of the 13th U.S. Infantry, lieutenant colonel of the 21st U.S. Infantry, and colonel and brigadier-general of the 29th U.S. Infantry
- Henry Lutz Cake: A second lieutenant with the 25th Pennsylvania, Cake was elected colonel of that regiment on May 1, 1861, served as the commanding officer of the 96th Pennsylvania from September 1861 to March 1863, and served in the U.S. House of Representatives from March 4, 1867 to March 3, 1871
- William G. Mitchell: A private with Company E, 25th Pennsylvania, Mitchell rose through the ranks to become a major with the 7th Pennsylvania under General Robert Patterson, a first lieutenant with the 49th Pennsylvania and then, in December 1861, aide-de-camp to Major-General Winfield Scott Hancock

== See also ==
- List of Pennsylvania Civil War Units
