= Folta =

Folta is a surname. Notable people with this surname include:

- Carl Folta, executive vice president of corporate communications for Viacom
- Kevin Folta, chairman of the horticultural sciences department at the University of Florida
- Milan Folta, Slovak former handball player
