= Samuel R. Russel =

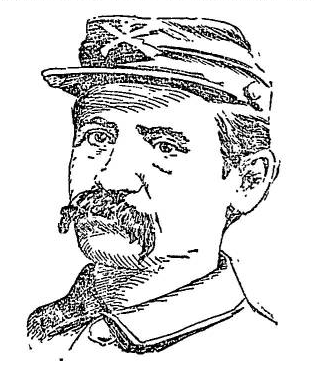
Sketch of Captain Samuel R. Russel as it appeared in his 1898 obituary

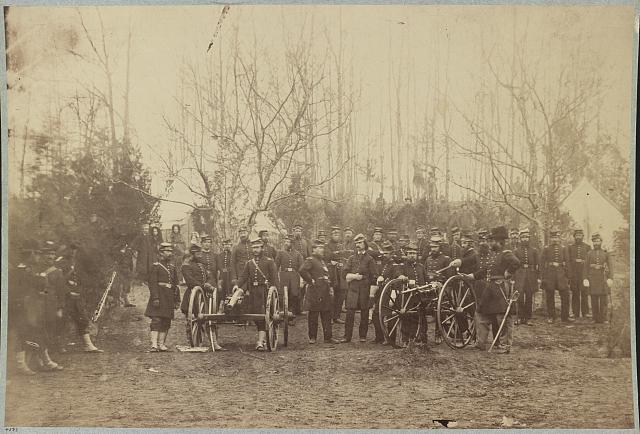
Library of Congress photo from February 1862; the man on left with hand on canon is believed to be Russel.

Samuel Rex Russel (June 10, 1839 – July 14, 1898) was a Corporal in Company B of the 25th Regiment of the Pennsylvania Infantry in the American Civil War from April 18, 1861, to July 29, 1861. He was discharged with the rank of First Sergeant. He rejoined as a Second Lieutenant of Company C of the 96th Regiment on September 23, 1861, and was promoted to Captain of Company H. He was discharged on May 1, 1863.

== Early life ==
Samuel R. Russel was born in Pottsville, Pennsylvania on June 10, 1839, to Andrew Russel and Susan Nice Rex. He attended Pottsville public schools before attending an academy in Burlington, New Jersey.

== Civil War service ==
On April 12, 1861, Fort Sumter was fired on by southern rebels and U.S. President Abraham Lincoln called for 75,000 volunteers to serve three months to put down the rebellion. At this time, Russel was living in Pottsville, Pennsylvania and was a volunteer fireman with the Good Intent Fire Company. On April 17, 1861, Russel and the Washington Artillerists of Pottsville, Pennsylvania answered Lincoln's call. Their troop was also joined with the National Light Infantry of Pottsville, Pennsylvania, the Ringgold Light Artillery of Reading, Pennsylvania, the Logan Guards of Lewistown, Pennsylvania, and the Allen Infantry of Allentown, Pennsylvania. These troops would forever be known as the First Defenders.

After ninety days, the men returned to Pennsylvania and mustered out on July 24, 1861. Russel rejoined the U.S. Army as a Second Lieutenant on September 23, 1861, joining Company C of the 96th Pennsylvania Infantry Regiment. He was eventually promoted to Captain of Company H of the same regiment. Among others, Samuel was appointed to find a cannon. After obtaining it, the men melted brass and molded their own cannon. Since most were former firemen, they called themselves the Good Intent Light Artillery Company.

== Post-War life ==
Russel invested in the oil business after the Civil War, speculating in the December Oil Company. The investment went bad and ruined Samuel Russel financially. He then served for more than a decade as a railroad mail agent before obtaining a job with the United States Mint. He was a Mint employee at the time of his July 14, 1898 death. Russel and his wife, Anna M. Doherty, were parents of six children.
