= Laudon =

Laudon may refer to:

- Laudon Symphony, a symphony by Joseph Haydn in C major
- Laudon (river), a river that feeds Lake Annecy
- Mount Laudon, Antarctica

== People with the surname ==
- Adolf Laudon (1912–1984), Austrian football player
- Ernst Gideon von Laudon (1717–1790), Austrian field marshal
- Johann Ludwig Alexius von Loudon (1767–1822), Austrian general
- Kenneth C. Laudon, an American professor of information systems
- Lowell Robert Laudon (1905–1993), American paleontologist, worked with Raymond Cecil Moore
