= Henry L. Cake =

American politician

Henry Lutz Cake
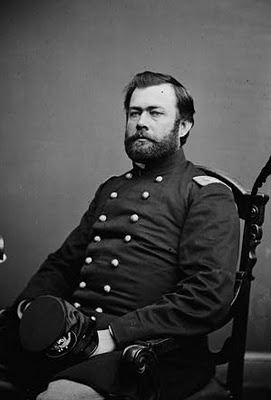
- Cake during his service in the 25th Pennsylvania Infantry Regiment

Member of the U.S. House of Representatives from Pennsylvania's 10th district
- In office March 4, 1867 – March 3, 1871
- Preceded by: Myer Strouse
- Succeeded by: John W. Killinger

Personal details
- Born: October 6, 1827 Northumberland, Pennsylvania, U.S.
- Died: August 26, 1899 (aged 71) Northumberland, Pennsylvania, U.S.
- Party: Republican

Military service
- Allegiance: United States of America
- Branch/service: Union Army
- Years of service: 1861-1863
- Rank: Colonel
- Commands: 25th Pennsylvania Infantry Regiment 96th Pennsylvania Infantry Regiment

Henry Lutz Cake (October 6, 1827 – August 26, 1899) was a Republican member of the U.S. House of Representatives from Pennsylvania.

== Early life and education ==
Henry L. Cake was born near Northumberland, Pennsylvania. He attended the common and private schools. He learned the art of printing, and published the Pottsville Mining Record until the American Civil War in April 1861.

== Career ==
=== Union Army ===
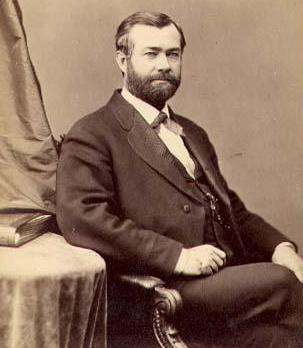
Cake in the Barnes Publishing Company Photo Archives at Georgetown University Library in Washington, D.C.

Cake entered the Union Army on April 17, 1861, as a second lieutenant, and was elected colonel of the 25th Pennsylvania Infantry Regiment, in Washington, D.C., on May 1, 1861. He reorganized the regiment after three months’ service. He commanded the 96th Pennsylvania Infantry Regiment from September 23, 1861, to March 12, 1863, when he resigned and settled in Tamaqua, Pennsylvania.

Following his resignation from the military, Cake engaged in the mining and shipping of anthracite coal.

=== U.S. House of Representatives ===
Cake was elected as a Republican to the Fortieth and Forty-first Congresses. He served as chairman of the United States House Committee on Accounts during the Forty-first Congress. He was an unsuccessful candidate for renomination in 1870.

=== Return to coal industry ===
Following his service in the U.S. House of Representatives, Cake resumed his involvement in the mining and shipping of coal.

== Death and interment ==
He died in Northumberland, Pennsylvania in 1899, and was interred in the Riverview Cemetery.

== See also ==
- History of coal mining in the United States

U.S. House of Representatives
Preceded by Myer Strouse	Member of the U.S. House of Representatives from Pennsylvania's 10th congressional district 1867-1871	Succeeded by John Weinland Killinger
