= John W. Killinger =

American politician (1824–1896)

Member of the U.S. House of Representatives from Pennsylvania's 14th district
- In office March 4, 1877 – March 3, 1881
- Preceded by: John Black Packer
- Succeeded by: Samuel Fleming Barr

Member of the U.S. House of Representatives from Pennsylvania's 10th district
- In office March 4, 1871 – March 3, 1875
- Preceded by: Henry L. Cake
- Succeeded by: William Mutchler
- In office March 4, 1859 – March 3, 1863
- Preceded by: John Christian Kunkel
- Succeeded by: Myer Strouse

Member of Pennsylvania House of Representatives
- In office 1850-1851

Member of the Pennsylvania Senate for the 7th district
- In office 1854-1857
- Preceded by: Edward C. Darlington
- Succeeded by: Christian Markle Straub

Personal details
- Born: September 18, 1824 Annville, Pennsylvania, US
- Died: June 30, 1896 (aged 71) Lebanon, Pennsylvania, US
- Party: Republican
- Education: Franklin & Marshall College

John Weinland Killinger (September 18, 1824 – June 30, 1896) was an American politician from Pennsylvania who served as a Republican member of the U.S. House of Representatives for Pennsylvania's 10th congressional district from 1859 to 1863 and from 1871 to 1875. He also served as a member of Pennsylvania's 14th congressional district from 1877 to 1881.

== Early life and education ==
John W. Killinger was born in Annville, Pennsylvania to John and Fanny Killinger. He attended the public schools of Annville and the Lebanon Academy in Lebanon, Pennsylvania. He graduated from the Mercersburg Preparatory School in Mercersburg, Pennsylvania, and from Franklin & Marshall College in Lancaster, Pennsylvania, in 1843. He studied law in Lancaster, was admitted to the bar in 1846 and practiced in Lebanon County, Pennsylvania, from 1846 to 1886.

== Career ==
He served as prosecuting attorney for Lebanon County in 1848 and 1849.

He was a member of the Pennsylvania State House of Representatives in 1850 and 1851, and served in the Pennsylvania State Senate for the 7th district from 1854 to 1857. He was a delegate to the 1856 Republican National Convention.

Killinger was elected as a Republican to the Thirty-sixth and Thirty-seventh Congresses. He served as a chairman of the United States House Committee on Expenditures in the Post Office Department during the Thirty-seventh Congress. He was not a candidate for renomination in 1862. He served as assessor of internal revenue from 1864 to 1866.

Killinger was again elected to the Forty-second and Forty-third Congresses. He was not a candidate for renomination in 1874. He resumed the practice of law. He was again elected to the Forty-fifth and Forty-sixth Congresses. He was not a candidate for renomination in 1880. He served as solicitor for the Philadelphia and Reading Railroad.

He died in Lebanon, Pennsylvania, in 1896.

== Sources ==
- United States Congress. "John W. Killinger (id: K000179)". Biographical Directory of the United States Congress.
- The Political Graveyard

U.S. House of Representatives
Preceded by John Christian Kunkel	Member of the U.S. House of Representatives from Pennsylvania's 10th congressional district 1859–1863	Succeeded by Myer Strouse
Preceded by Henry L. Cake	Member of the U.S. House of Representatives from Pennsylvania's 10th congressional district 1871–1875	Succeeded by William Mutchler
Preceded by John B. Packer	Member of the U.S. House of Representatives from Pennsylvania's 14th congressional district 1877–1881	Succeeded by Samuel F. Barr
