= Sally Jacobsen =

American journalist

- Born: June 12, 1946
- Died: May 11, 2017 (aged 70); Sleepy Hollow, New York
- Education: Iowa State University (BA); Cornell University (MS)
- Occupations: Journalist; foreign correspondent; editor
- Years active: 1976–2015
- Spouse: Patrick Oster
- Children: 1

Sally Jacobsen (June 12, 1946 – May 11, 2017) was an American journalist, foreign correspondent and editor whose career spanned 39-years at the Associated Press. In 1999, Jacobsen became the first woman to serve as the international editor for the AP, where she oversaw the news agency's overseas news bureaus. During her tenure as international editor, Jacobson supervised the AP's foreign coverage on the United States invasion of Afghanistan in 2001 and the 2003 war in Iraq. She was later promoted to AP deputy managing editor for operations and projects, where she edited the AP Stylebook.

Jacobsen grew up in Gunnison, Colorado. She received her bachelor's degree from Iowa State University and a master's degree in economics from Cornell University.

Jacobsen retired from the Associated Press in 2015 and resided in Croton-on-Hudson, New York. She was married to Patrick Oster, a novelist and retired managing editor for Bloomberg News, and they had a son, Alex. She died from cancer at Phelps Memorial Hospital in Sleepy Hollow, New York, on May 11, 2017, at the age of 70.
