= Amityville, Pennsylvania =

Unincorporated community in Pennsylvania, US

- Unincorporated community
- Location within Pennsylvania Location within the United States
- Coordinates: 40°18′00″N 75°44′11″W
- Country: United States
- State: Pennsylvania
- County: Berks
- Township: Amity
- Elevation: 331 ft (101 m)
- Time zone: UTC-5 (Eastern (EST))
  - Summer (DST): UTC-4 (EDT)
- ZIP code: 19518
- Area codes: 610 and 484
- GNIS feature ID: 1202972

Amityville is an unincorporated community in Berks County, Pennsylvania, United States, near the borough of Pottstown. It is located on Old Swede Road in Amity Township.

== History ==
The post office Amityville contained was named Athol. The Athol post office was established in 1885.

== Notable people ==
- William Auman, American Brigadier General (1838–1920)
