= William Auman =

American brigadier general (1838–1920)

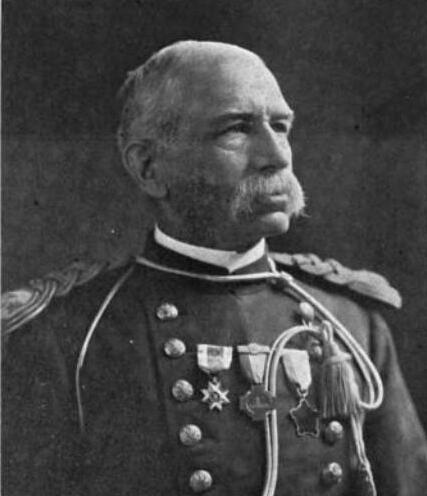
- Auman as a Brigadier General
- Born: October 17, 1838; Amityville, Pennsylvania, U.S.
- Died: May 21, 1920 (aged 81); Pasadena, California, U.S.
- Burial place: Arlington National Cemetery, Virginia, U.S.
- Spouse: Emma E. Auman
- Military career
- Branch: United States Army
- Service years: 1861–1865; 1866–1892; 1898–1902
- Rank: Brigadier General
- Units: 25th Pennsylvania Infantry Regiment; 48th Pennsylvania Infantry Regiment
- Commands: 13th Infantry Regiment; 29th Infantry Regiment
- Conflicts: American Civil War; Siege of Petersburg (WIA); American Indian Wars (WIA); Spanish–American War; Santiago campaign; Battle of San Juan Hill; Philippine–American War; Luzon campaign; Battle of Manila

William Auman (1838-1920) was an American brigadier general of during the American Civil War and Spanish–American War. He was known for commanding the 13th Infantry Regiment during the Battle of San Juan Hill and was the first officer to reach the top of the hill.

== Origin ==
William Auman was born on October 17, 1838, at Amityville, Pennsylvania Before the American Civil War broke out, William moved to Pottsville, Pennsylvania, at some point and worked as a clerk there.

== American Civil War ==
Auman enlisted in the Union Army on September 11, 1861, within Company G of the 48th Pennsylvania Infantry Regiment at 22 years of age. On April 18, 1862, he was briefly a private within Company B at the 25th Pennsylvania Infantry Regiment until July 29 when he placed back in the 48th Pennsylvania at Company G with the ranks of sergeant and corporal from September 29, 1862, to July 23, 1864. The next day, Auman was promoted to second lieutenant and to first lieutenant on September 12, 1864. Finally, he was promoted to captain on June 4, 1865, after being brevetted captain on April 2, 1864, for "gallant and meritorious services" during the Siege of Petersburg but was also wounded in the mouth in the campaign. Despite being honorably mustered out on July 17, 1865, Auman re-enlisted in the U.S. Army on May 11, 1866, as a second lieutenant within the 13th Infantry Regiment.

== Service in the Frontier ==
=== Defense of the Corral ===
In his new post within the 13th Infantry Regiment, Auman was promoted to first lieutenant by May 17, 1868, as well as the post quartermaster of Company B of the regiment. On the same day, several Native Americans began approaching the post. He assumed that the Natives were there to threaten the regiment's animals as they were armed. Auman got on a horse with a rifle equipped and began to round up the animals in the corral. After rounding them all up, Auman approached a field piece within the post as the Natives were now 200 yards away from the camp and while attempting to activate it, received a serious gunshot wound in his left foot.

=== Promotions and initial retirement ===
Auman was promoted to captain on March 26, 1879 but was reported to retire on April 16, 1892, at his own personal request as was reported on a 1906 issue of The Morning Press.

== Spanish-American War ==
Despite retiring at his own request, upon the outbreak of the Spanish–American War, he re-enlisted as a major on April 26, 1898. Given command of the 13th Infantry Regiment, the regiment was the last division of Major General William Rufus Shafter and landed at Siboney on June 25 with further orders to advance to Santiago de Cuba. During the Battle of San Juan Hill, he was given command of the 13th Infantry Regiment and lead the regiment during the battle. Auman reportedly said "Forward, Thirteenth!" as he led the initial charge against the Spanish forces on the hill, managing to become the first commander to reach the hill. Auman's forces also managed to capture the Spanish flag, block house and entrenchments.

Auman was given commendations for his actions at the battle, notably being praised by Bvt. Major General Adelbert Ames and Major General Jacob Ford Kent. Around this time, Auman briefly participated in the Philippine–American War at the Battle of Manila. Later on, Auman was transferred to the 21st Infantry Regiment and promoted to lieutenant colonel on September 7, 1900, but was placed back on the 13th Infantry Regiment on March 11, 1901. Auman was then placed on the 29th Infantry Regiment as its colonel on October 16, 1901. Auman was then given his highest promotion to brigadier general on April 16, 1902, before retiring on May 10 of the same year.

=== Later years ===
In 1866, Auman married Emma E. Rosengarten (1844–1919) and they proceeded to have five children together but three of them would die at an early age. In 1906, Auman was spotted as a guest within the Potter Hotel at Santa Barbara, California. He died on May 21, 1920, at Pasadena, California, and his ashes were interred at Arlington National Cemetery next to his wife on June 4, 1920.
