= St. Augustine's Episcopal Church Complex =

Historic church in New York state

- U.S. National Register of Historic Places
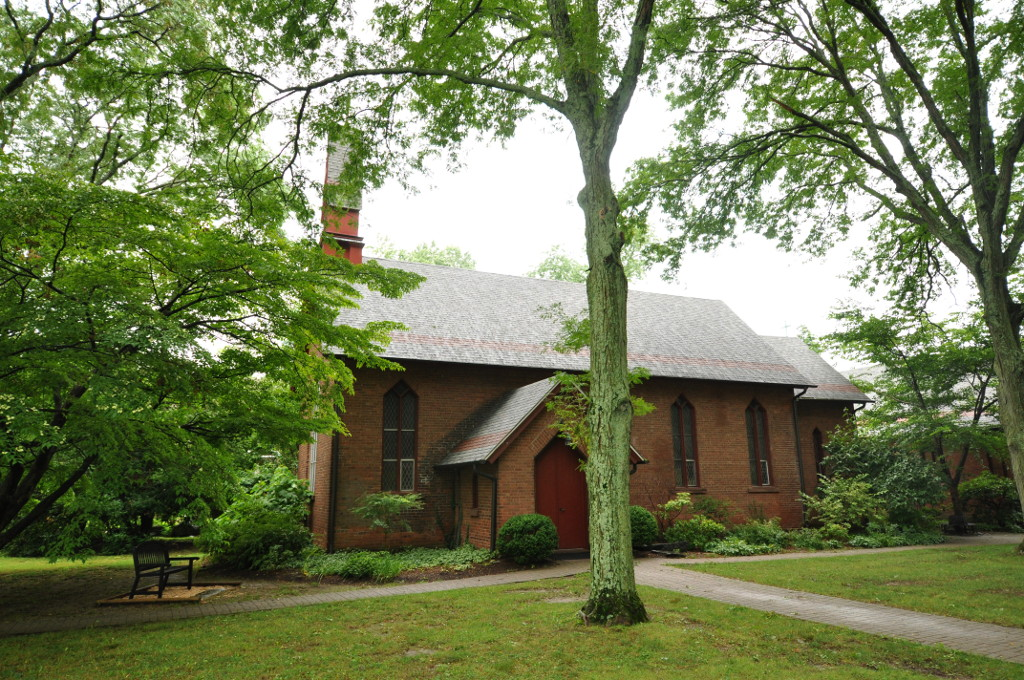

- Location within New York Location within the United States
- Location: 6 Old Post Rd. N, Croton-on-Hudson, New York
- Coordinates: 41°12′30″N 73°53′13″W
- Area: less than one acre
- Built: 1857
- Architect: Bird, Seth
- Architectural style: Gothic Revival, Colonial Revival
- NRHP reference No.: 06000648
- Added to NRHP: July 26, 2006

St. Augustine's Episcopal Church Complex is a historic Episcopal church complex at 6 Old Post Road north of Croton-on-Hudson, Westchester County, New York. The complex consists of the church and rectory: the original building and a later parish hall connected by an enclosed hyphen. The church was built in 1857, the parish hall was added in 1882, and the rectory was completed in 1910. The church and parish hall are in the Gothic Revival style, while the rectory is in the Colonial Revival style. The building was added to the National Register of Historic Places in 2006.

The church reported 312 members in 2022 and 253 members in 2023; no membership statistics were reported nationally in 2024 parochial reports. Plate and pledge income reported for the congregation in 2024 was $206,371. Average Sunday attendance (ASA) in 2024 was 65 persons, down from a reported 87 in 2016.

== See also ==
- National Register of Historic Places listings in northern Westchester County, New York
