= Donald A. Wallance =

American metalworker and furniture designer (1909 - 1990)

- Born: 1909; Queens, New York
- Died: 1990 (aged 80–81); Phelps Memorial Hospital, North Tarrytown, New York
- Occupations: Metalworker, furniture and industrial designer
- Years active: 1941-1989
- Notable work: Shaping America's Products, Design One, Design Ten

Donald A. Wallance (1909–1990) was an American metalworker, furniture and industrial designer. His book, Shaping America's Products, is described as a "seminal study of the relationship of craftsmanship to industry," by the Cooper-Hewitt, National Design Museum.

== Early life and education ==
Wallance was born in Queens, New York in 1909. He studied English literature at New York University, graduating with a B.A. in 1930. He travelled in Northern Europe where he was exposed to international style architecture and design. He returned to the United States and worked for his father, who owned a furniture store. His work there inspired his interest in designing retail furniture. He attended the Design Laboratory School in New York from 1936 until the school closed in 1940, where he studied Bauhaus design theory.

== Career ==
For one year, starting in 1941, he worked as the technical and design director for the National Youth Administration in Louisiana. He designed mass-produced furniture for servicemen's families who lived abroad during World War II. He also served in the Army Air Corps. In 1951 he worked for H.E. Lauffer in 1951. For Lauffer he designed cutlery and tableware, including the flatware set Design One in 1953 and the plastic flatware set, Design Ten, in 1978–79. In 1964 he designed the cantilever seating for the Philharmonic Hall at Lincoln Center. The chairs were made of steel and upholstered polyurethane foam. They were described as "infinitely comfortable," by Winthrop Sargent. He designed hospital furniture for the Hard Manufacturing Company in 1965.

== Later life and death ==
Wallance lived in Croton-on-Hudson, New York. In 1989, he founded, and until 1989 he served as chairman of the Croton Visual Environmental Board. He died in 1990 at Phelps Memorial Hospital in North Tarrytown, New York of congestive heart failure.

== Legacy ==
The Design One and Design Ten sets, originally designed for H.E. Lauffer, are still manufactured today, by the Towle Manufacturing Company. Wallance's work is held in the collection of the Cooper-Hewitt, National Design Museum.

== Bibliography ==
- Shaping America's Products. New York: Reinhold Publishing Group (1956).
