= Myer Strouse =

American politician

Myer Strouse (December 16, 1825 – February 11, 1878) was a Democratic member of the U.S. House of Representatives from Pennsylvania.

== Biography ==
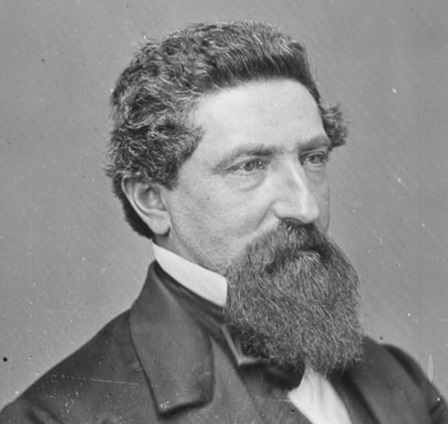
Brady-Handy photo, circa 1863

Myer Strouse was born in Oberstrau, Kingdom of Bavaria to a Jewish family. He immigrated to the United States in 1832 with his father, who settled in Pottsville, Pennsylvania. He attended private schools and edited the North American Farmer in Philadelphia from 1848 to 1852. He studied law, was admitted to the bar in 1855 and commenced practice in Pottsville.

Strouse was elected as a Democrat to the Thirty-eighth and Thirty-ninth Congresses. He was not a candidate for renomination in 1866. He resumed the practice of law, and was attorney and solicitor for the "Molly Maguires," a secret organization in the mining regions of Pennsylvania, in 1876 and 1877. He died in Pottsville in 1878, and was buried in Odd Fellows Cemetery.

== See also ==
- List of Jewish members of the United States Congress

== Sources ==
- United States Congress. "Myer Strouse (id: S001026)". Biographical Directory of the United States Congress.
- The Political Graveyard

U.S. House of Representatives
Preceded by John W. Killinger	Member of the U.S. House of Representatives from Pennsylvania's 10th congressional district 1863 - 1867	Succeeded by Henry L. Cake
