= Louis M. Kunkel =

American geneticist

Louis Martens Kunkel (born October 13, 1949) is an American geneticist and member of the National Academy of Sciences (NAS). His father (Henry G. Kunkel) and grandfather (Louis O. Kunkel) were also scientists and NAS members.

== Early life and career ==
Kunkel came from a Lutheran background and attended Lutheran schools in youth. He later graduated from Gettysburg College in 1971. He obtained his PhD from Johns Hopkins University. He is noted for discovering dystrophin, which is relevant to muscular dystrophy research.

== Awards ==
- 1988 GlaxoSmithKline Prize
- 1989 Gairdner Foundation International Award
- 1991 E. Mead Johnson Award
- 2004 William Allan Award
- 2009 March of Dimes Prize in Developmental Biology
- 2025 Louisa Gross Horwitz Prize (Columbia University).
