= Kunkle =

Kunkle may refer to:

- Kunkle, Ohio, census-designated place in Williams County, Ohio, United States
- Kunkle, Pennsylvania, unincorporated community in Luzerne County, Pennsylvania, United States
- Connie Kunkle, American television personality and singer
- Kunkletown, Pennsylvania, unincorporated community, United States

== See also ==
- Kunkel (surname)
