= Jacques Banchereau =

French-American immunologist

- Education: University of Angers (BS) University of Paris (PhD)
- Known for: Dendritic Cells
- Awards: AAI-Steinman Award
- Scientific career
- Fields: Biochemistry, Immunology, Molecular Biology

Jacques Banchereau is an internationally prominent French American immunologist and molecular biologist. He is the Founder and President of Immunoledge, LLC and Chief Innovation Officer of Georgiamune, Inc. He was formerly professor and director of immunological sciences at the Jackson Laboratory for Genomic Medicine and also the former chief science officer, senior vice president, and DTA (Discovery and Translational Area) head of inflammation & virology at Hoffman-La Roche. He is best known for his extensive research on dendritic cells with Nobel Laureate Ralph M. Steinman. In the early 2000s, he was one of the most cited immunologists.

== Experience ==
Banchereau was born in France. He graduated from University of Angers as a pharmacist in 1975. He completed his PhD study in biochemistry from University of Paris in 1980, which included a year at Columbia University. He was involved with the discovery and functional analysis of GM-CSF, IL-4, IL-5, IL-10, IL-13, and IL-17. After his time at Columbia, he started his career as a scientist at Schering-Plough France in 1981, and quickly rose to the post of director for immunological research in 1984. In 1996, he founded the Baylor Institute for Immunology Research in Dallas, TX. Since then, his academic appointments have included positions at Mount Sinai School of Medicine, Université Paris 13, University of Connecticut School of Medicine, and Yale School of Medicine. In 2010, he joined Hoffman-La Roche at Nutley to become the chief scientific officer, senior vice president, and head of inflammation and virology. In 2013, he was appointed Director of Immunological Sciences at the Jackson Laboratory. In 2021, he transitioned to Chief Scientific Officer at Immunai. He founded Immunoledge, LLC in 2023 and remains its President. He also currently holds the position of Chief Innovation Officer at Georgiamune, Inc.

== Research ==
In addition to Banchereau's contribution on discovery of multiple interluekins and understanding them, his most well-known researches include the dendritic cells and vaccines. While Ralph M. Steinman discovered dendritic cells, Banchereau was one of the first to find a way to grow them. His major work on dendritic cells include cancer vaccines and immunotherapy. He is the author of more than 500 peer-reviewed scientific articles and about 275 book chapters and reviews. He also holds 41 patents. His current research interest is on understanding RNA splicing for receptors.

== Works ==
- Banchereau, Jacques, and Ralph M. Steinman. "Dendritic cells and the control of immunity." Nature 392.6673 (1998): 245.
- Banchereau, Jacques, et al. "Immunobiology of dendritic cells." Annual review of immunology 18.1 (2000): 767–811.
- Steinman, Ralph M., and Jacques Banchereau. "Taking dendritic cells into medicine." Nature 449.7161 (2007): 419.
- Banchereau, Jacques, and A. Karolina Palucka. "Dendritic cells as therapeutic vaccines against cancer." Nature Reviews Immunology 5.4 (2005): 296.
- van Kooten, Cees, and Jacques Banchereau. "CD40‐CD40 ligand." Journal of leukocyte biology 67.1 (2000): 2-17.
- Banchereau, Jacques, et al. "Immune and clinical responses in patients with metastatic melanoma to CD34+ progenitor-derived dendritic cell vaccine." Cancer research 61.17 (2001): 6451–6458.
- Banchereau, Jacques, and Virginia Pascual. "Type I interferon in systemic lupus erythematosus and other autoimmune diseases." Immunity 25.3 (2006): 383–392.
- Banchereau, Jacques, et al. "Long-term human B cell lines dependent on interleukin-4 and antibody to CD40." Science251.4989 (1991): 70–72.
- Banchereau, Jacques, et al. "Dendritic cells as vectors for therapy." Cell 106.3 (2001): 271–274.
