= 96th Pennsylvania Infantry Regiment =

Union Army infantry regiment

96th Pennsylvania Volunteer Infantry
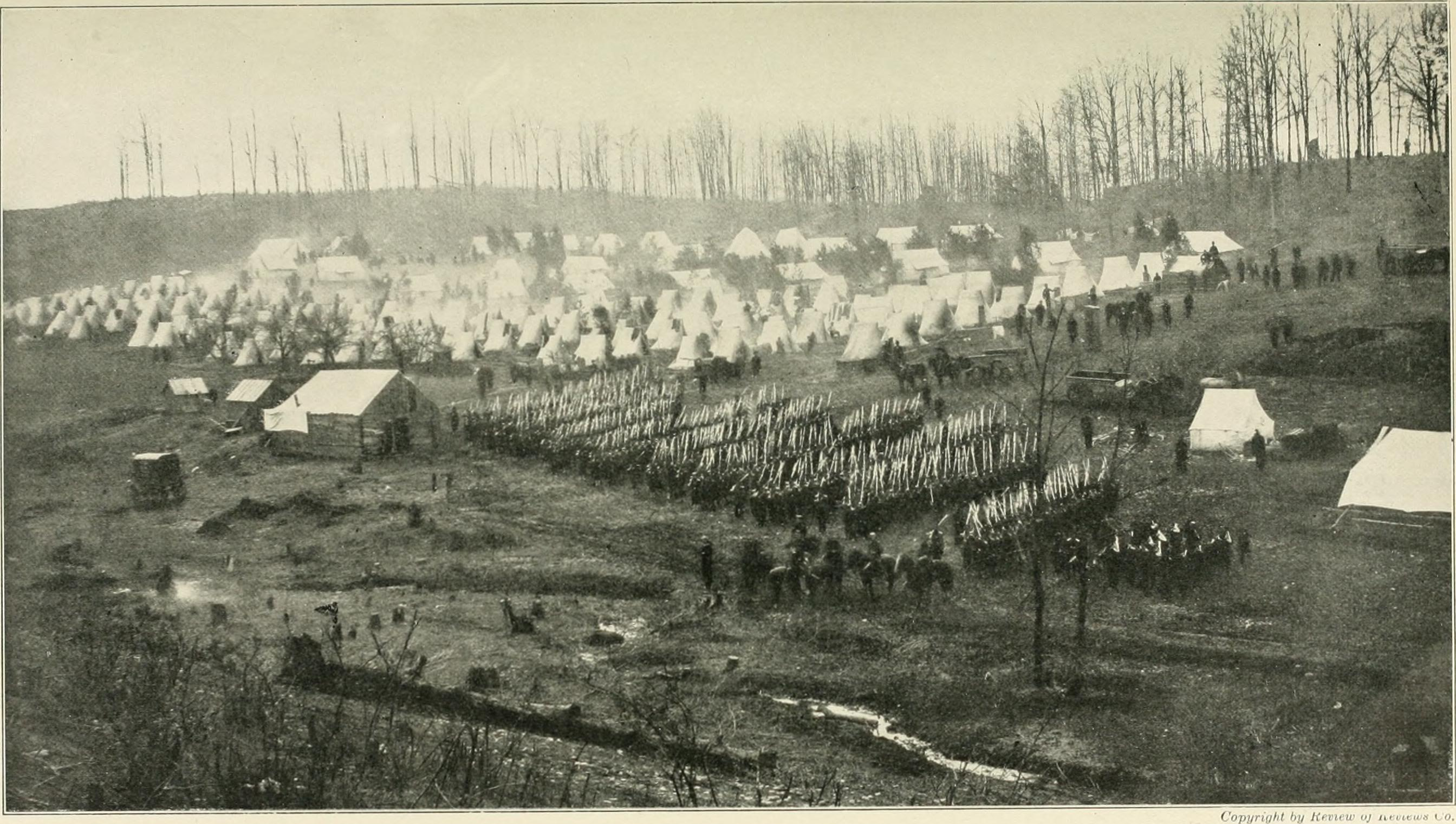
- 96th Pennsylvania Infantry at Camp Northumberland near Washington, DC, February, 1862
- Active: September 23, 1861, to October 21, 1864
- Country: United States
- Allegiance: Union
- Branch: Infantry
- Size: 1,153
- Engagements: Battle of West Point or Eltham's Landing; Battle of Gaines's Mill; Battle of Glendale; Battle of Malvern Hill; Northern Virginia Campaign; Maryland Campaign; Crampton's Gap; Battle of Antietam; Battle of Fredericksburg; Mud March (American Civil War); Battle of Chancellorsville; Battle of Franklin's Crossing; Battle of Salem Church; Battle of Gettysburg; Bristoe Campaign; Second Battle of Rappahannock Station; Mine Run Campaign; Battle of the Wilderness; Battle of Spotsylvania Court House; Battle of Cold Harbor; Battle of Jerusalem Plank Road; Third Battle of Winchester; Battle of Fisher's Hill

The 96th Pennsylvania Volunteer Infantry was an infantry regiment that served in the Union Army during the American Civil War.

== Organization ==
Henry L. Cake, who had commanded the 25th Pennsylvania Infantry Regiment, had received authority from the U.S. War Department, on 13 August 1861, to raise a regiment for three years; and establishing a camp at Lawton's Hill, overlooking the town of Pottsville, Pennsylvania, at once commencing the work of recruiting with many of the officers and men of his old command entering the new. The National Light Infantry of Pottsville, Pennsylvania, a militia company of over thirty years' standing, was the first organized body of men in the United States to offer its services to the government at the outbreak of the rebellion. Having been accepted, it was one of the first five companies from Pennsylvania to reach the menaced capital, and afterwards became a part of the 25th Pennsylvania Infantry in the three months' service. Afterwards it formed the nucleus of the 96th Regiment, and recruited and re-organized under its former Second Lieutenant, Lewis J. Martin, was the first to report in camp. With the exception of companies C, E, G and H, in which were some men from Luzerne, Berks, Dauphin, and Montgomery counties, the regiment was recruited in Schuylkill County, Pennsylvania. On 23 September the command was mustered into the United States service with the following field officers: Henry L. Cake, Colonel; Jacob G. Frick, Lieutenant Colonel; Lewis J. Martin, Major.

A week later, a company under William H. Lessig, organized as a light battery, to be attached to the regiment, came into camp. Subsequently, Company C, Captain Beaton Smith, was, by order of the Governor, transferred to the Fifty-second Regiment, when Lessig's Good Intent Light Artillery was substituted as infantry in its place. On 6 November, Governor Andrew Gregg Curtin and staff visited Pottsville, and presented, with appropriate ceremonies, the State colors.

== History ==
=== Early Service ===
On 8 November the regiment moved by rail to Washington, and upon its arrival went into camp at Kendall Green, where it was armed with Harper's Ferry muskets. Colonel Cake promptly reported to General Casey, and was at once placed in command of the First Provisional Brigade, of which the Ninety-sixth formed part. The regiment was here thoroughly drilled in the manual, company, and battalion exercises. On the 25th it crossed the Potomac, and encamped on the Leesburg Pike, a short distance beyond Fort Ellsworth. It was assigned to Slocum's Brigade of Franklin's Division, and on 27 December went into permanent winter-quarters on the Loudoun and Hampshire Railroad, near its crossing of Four Mile Run. It remained engaged in drill and occasional picket duty until 10 March 1862, when it joined in the abortive movement upon Manassas, but soon returned to camp. On 4 April, with McDowell's Corps, it took up the line of march for Fredericksburg. On reaching Catlett's Station it went into camp, and remained until the 12th, when Franklin's Division returned to Alexandria, and embarked for the Peninsula. McClellan was now engaged in the siege of Yorktown, and on the 23rd, the division having arrived, a part of it debarked n the vicinity of Cheeseman's Creek. The enemy having evacuated Yorktown on 4 May, the troops on shore again embarked, and proceeding up the York River, on the 6th, in company with the divisions of Sedgwick, Porter, and Richardson, arrived at four P.M. at Brick House Point, below West Point, where the Twenty-seventh New York, and companies A, B, C and D, of the Ninety-sixth debarked, and forming in line of battle, with skirmishers thrown out, advanced for the protection of the pioneers engaged in slashing timber and obstructing the roads.

=== Battle of West Point ===
"At nine o'clock on the following morning the order was given for the Sixteenth, Thirty-first, and Thirty-second New York, and the Ninety-fifth and Ninety-sixth Pennsylvania regiments to advance into the woods and drive off some of the rebel scouts who were firing occasional shots at our pickets, supposed to be supported by a force concealed in the woods. This proved correct; for no sooner had our men made an advance into the woods than they were received with a volley of musketry from the rebels who were hidden in the dense undergrowth. Our men pressed on and gave them a volley, after which the enemy retreated further into the woods, with the Thirty-second New York close at their heels; but they were too swift footed for our boys-being more protected-and they soon left the Thirty-second struggling in the mud." The Ninety-sixth was now held upon the extreme left of the line, nearest to Brick House Point, to prevent a flank movement of the enemy in that direction, while the fighting on the right center, where his forces were concealed in a dense swamp, was animated, the Thirty-first and Thirty-second New York, and the Ninety-fifth Pennsylvania sustaining considerable loss.

After the engagement at West Point, the Fifth and Sixth Provisional corps were organized, to the latter of which General Franklin was assigned, General Slocum being promoted to the command of the division, and Colonel Bartlett, of the Twenty-seventh New York, to that of the brigade. On the 25th the division moved past Gaines' Mill, and went into camp in the vicinity of Hogan's House, just beyond. A few days later the brigade moved up to Mechanicsville, where it remained doing picket duty along the Chickahominy until 6 June, when it returned to its former position at the Hogan House. On the 18th the division was relieved by the Pennsylvania Reserves, and crossing the Chickahominy at Woodbury Bridge, took position on the right bank, between Smith's Division, which had the right, and Sumner's Corps the left. Here the brigade remained engaged in arduous picket and fatigue duty until the opening of the Seven Days' Battles. On the evening of that day, the 26th, a detail of three hundred and fifty men of the Ninety-sixth, with a like detail of the Seventh Maine, under Lieutenant Colonel Jacob G. Frick, advanced to the front in the direction of Old Tavern, and under cover of darkness, threw up a redoubt in close proximity to the enemy's lines. At early dawn it retired unassailed, leaving the relief to fight during the day, what was known as the Battle of Golden's Farm.

=== Battle of Gaines's Mill ===
Returning to camp near Strong Courtney's House, it re-joined the brigade, and with the entire division moved to a position on the right of Smith's Division, between Lewis' Hill and Chickahominy, the right resting near Duane Bridge, opposite the left of the Gaines' Mill battle-field. Here it remained until two o'clock, when Porter's forces being hard pressed in the battle, under orders, Newton's, then Taylor's Jersey Brigade, and shortly after Bartlett's, marched to his support, crossing the Chickahominy by the Woodbury Bridge. Previous to starting, a detail from the Ninety-sixth, with one from the Third Vermont, under Adjutant M. E. Richards, destroyed Duane Bridge. At twenty minutes past three the brigade reached the scene of action on the left of the line, moved past General St. George Cooke's Cavalry, occupying a sheltered position to the rear and left of Adams' House, and was immediately afterwards ordered to the relief of Sykes' command, which was engaged in supporting Weed's, Edwards', and Tidball's batteries, the latter on the extreme right of the position. The arrival of the brigade was opportune. The Fifth and Tenth New York, on the left of Sykes, driven back, had been re-placed by the First Pennsylvania Reserve, which in turn was relieved by a part of Newton's Brigade. The Regulars, hard pressed, were wavering. Instantly the Fifth Maine, then the Twenty-seventh New York, the Sixteenth New York, and shortly after the Ninety-sixth Pennsylvania, advanced across the field under a heavy fire, and took position along the crest of the hill, from the left of Griffin's-then supported by Newton's men-to the rear of Tidball's Battery. The Ninety-sixth was at first held in support, closed in mass in the open valley below, where it was fearfully exposed. To shield his men and save them from the destruction to which they seemed almost inevitably condemned, Colonel Cake moved them close up on the side of the hill. The Sixteenth New York, which was ordered to advance, soon came under a fearful enfilading fire, and was driven in some confusion. The Ninety-sixth, which had in the meantime been deployed in line, was brought to confront the enemy's line, and the word given to advance. It was answered with a cheer, and as by one impulse, the line dashed forward; re-took the lost ground, and held it until night. The boldness of this charge undoubtedly saved the right of the army from disaster. The loss of the brigade in this engagement was severe, that of the Ninety-sixth was thirteen killed, fifty-nine wounded, and fourteen missing. Lieutenant Ernest T. Ellrich was among the killed.

Retiring to its old camp beyond Woodbury Bridge, the brigade rested for the night, and on the following morning was moved to Fort Davidson, to the right of the line. Scarcely had it got into position, when the enemy opened a heavy artillery fire from the vicinity of Dr. Gaines' House, on the opposite bluff of the Chickahominy, rendering the position untenable, and obliging it to retire, when, with the entire army, it about faced, and commenced the march for the James. After crossing White Oak Creek, it was posted to defend the passage, and in the battle of Charles City Cross Roads occupied a position to the right of the line, in the vicinity of Glendale. During the night of the 30th, it retired to Malvern Hill, where, during the terrific fighting of 1 July, it was posted on the extreme left of the field, near Carter's Mill, and Colonel Cake was placed in command of the brigade. Retiring with the army to Harrison's Landing, on the morning of 3 July, the regiment pitched tents on the muddy plains of Westover Landing. From this it moved out on the Westover Road, and after two successive changes of camps, on the 15th moved with the brigade into the breastworks looking towards Malvern Hill, where it remained employed in picket and fatigue duty until the evacuation. While here the regiment received Enfield rifles in exchange for the Austrian muskets with which it had made the campaign. The Pottsville Cornet Band, which had been attached to the regiment from its organization, was by a general order of the War Department relieved from further duty, and returned home. On the 29th Lieutenant Colonel Frick resigned, to take command of the One Hundred and Twenty-ninth Pennsylvania, Captain Joseph Anthony of company F, to be Major of the same regiment, and Lieutenant Z. P. Boyer of company D, to be Lieutenant Colonel of the One Hundred and Seventy-third Regiment.

On 16 August the brigade moved from camp on the James and taking transports at Newport News, arrived at Alexandria on the 24th, and went into bivouac along the Little River Turnpike, below Fort Ellsworth. On the 27th it moved into Fort Lyons, but was relieved on the 29th, and followed the rest of the corps, joining it at Annandale. On the 30th the corps pushed forward through Fairfax and Centreville, crossed Cub Run, and arrived in time to join in stemming the tide of disaster, which was sweeping the Bull Run battlefield.

=== Northern Virginia Campaign ===
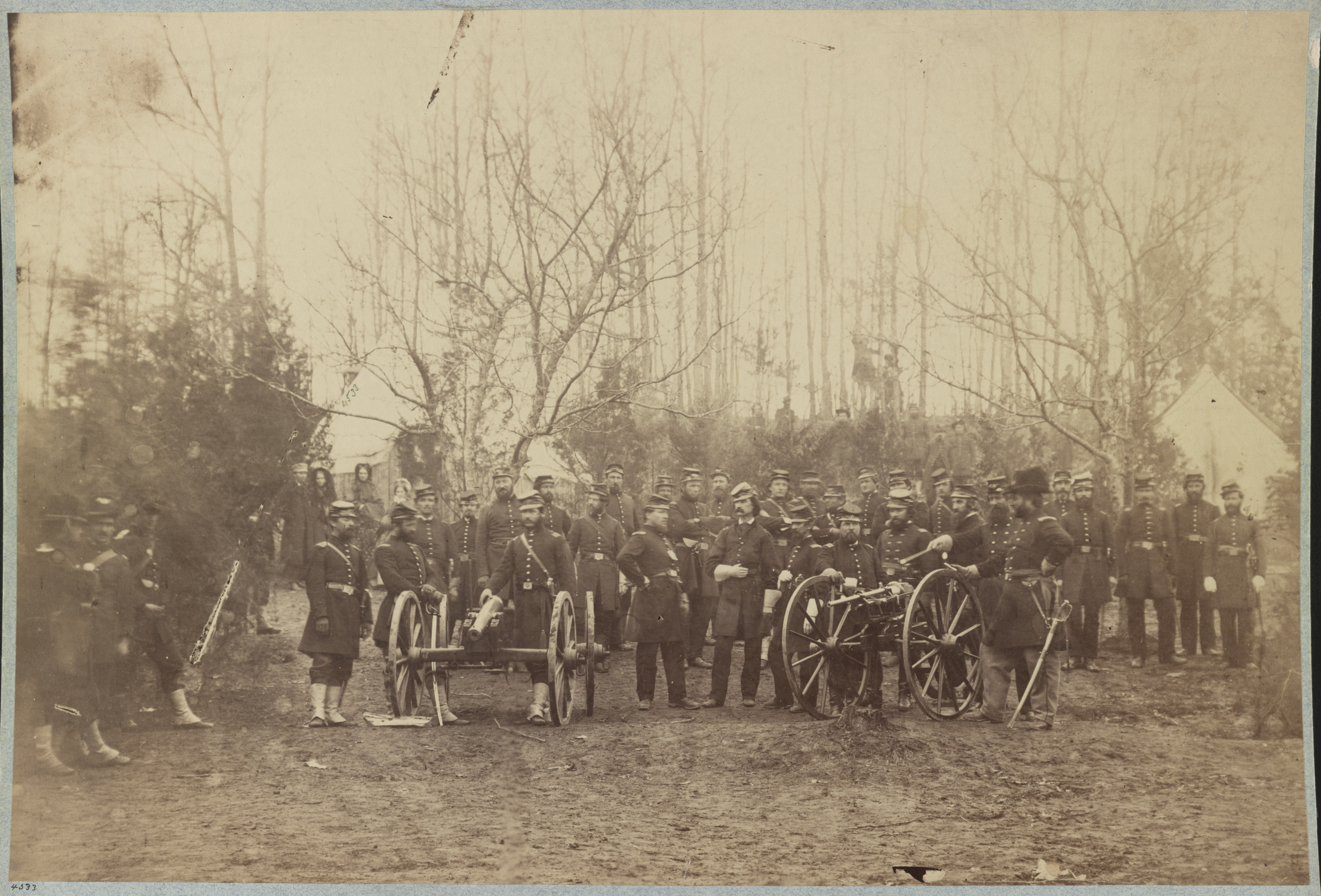
Officers of the 96th Pennsylvania Infantry at Camp Northumberland, Col. Cake being right of the Agar gun

Returning to Alexandria, the regiment joined in the Maryland campaign, which was immediately after inaugurated. The army moved for the crossing of the South Mountain, by Crampton's and Turner's passes. Each held by strong bodies of the enemy. Franklin's Corps arrived in front of Crampton's Gap, which debouches into Pleasant Valley in the rear of, and but five miles from Maryland Heights, opposite Harper's Ferry, at noon of 14 September. The Ninety-sixth in advance of the column, entered Burkettsville early in the morning, driving out the rebel skirmishers, and drew the fire of his artillery upon the mountain developing his line of defense. Immediately forming with Slocum on the right, his line being composed of Bartlett's and Torbert's brigades, supported by Newton's, with Smith disposed for the protection of Slocum's flank, Franklin attacked. The pass was held by Maj. Gen. Lafayette McLaws' Division of the rebel army, under General Cobb, the position an excellent one for defense. The brigade was formed on the right of the line, and advanced to within a thousand yards of a stone wall, where the enemy was making a final stand. The Ninety-sixth, which had been engaged upon the left of the line, now came up, and the other regiments of the brigade, with ammunition exhausted, falling back, advanced upon the concealed foe, in line with Torbert's Brigade, which had the left. The path of the Ninety-sixth was across open fields, intersected by fences and hedges, where every man presented a fair mark for the keen eyed rebel sharpshooter. But the line dashed forward, pausing at each fence to fire a volley, until it reached a thin strip of corn. As it approached this field the enemy's fire ceased, and while it was passing through it an ominous silence prevailed; but the moment it emerged from this slight cover a perfect sheet of flame was poured upon it, and many of the bravest fell. But unflinching the survivors dashed forward with the bayonet, completely routed the enemy's line, and took many prisoners. The loss in the Ninety-sixth was twenty killed, seventy-one severely, and fourteen slightly wounded, out of less than four hundred effective men who entered the engagement. Major Martin, and Lieutenant John Dougherty, were among the killed.

==== Battle of Antietam ====
On the 17th, at Antietam, Franklin's Corps arrived upon the right of the field, where the fighting had been most terrific, at a time when the corps of Hooker and Sumner, broken and greatly thinned, where yielding ground, and immediately hurled back the foe, sweeping across the corn field, and holding firmly the gory ground, over which the fiery bellows of the battle had been sweeping to and fro, until the close of the contest. The position of Bartlett's Brigade was to the rear and left of the batteries of Porter, Walcott, and Williston, where it remained throughout the day. Though exposed to a continuous and heavy artillery fire the loss in the regiment was only two killed. After the battle the corps was posted at the crossroads northeast of Bakersville. General Slocum, who had been promoted to the command of the Twelfth Corps, was succeeded in command of the division by General W. T. H. Brooks. Captain Peter A. Filbert was commissioned Lieutenant Colonel, to date from July 30, and Captain William H. Lessig to Major, to date from September 15.

With the corps the regiment moved back into Virginia, and followed the army in its subsequent maneuvers, until, under Burnside, it entered on the Fredericksburg campaign, Colonel Cake in the meantime being placed in command of a mixed force of infantry, cavalry, and artillery, which was in position at Thoroughfare Gap, and subsequently in command of the brigade. On 12 December, after having first assisted in laying the pontoons at Franklin's crossing, it moved over the Rappahannock, and after some skirmishing took position with the brigade along the Bowling Green Road at a point above where it is crossed by Deep Run. Here it remained, under an almost continuous shower of shot and shell without becoming actively engaged except upon the skirmish line, until the night of the 15th, when it re-crossed the river, the army at the same time retiring, and went into camp near White Oak Church. Late in December, Lieutenant Colonel Filbert was honorably discharged, Major Lessig being subsequently promoted to succeed him.

On 16 January 1863, the regiment moved to Belle Plain Landing on fatigue duty, retiring on the 19th, and on the 20th joined the column in its movement upon the Mud March. Returning to the old campgrounds of the brigade near White Oak Church on the 25th, the regiment remained until 1 February, when, with the exception of companies C and K, it was detached, and sent to Windmill Point on heavy fatigue duty [to unload coal barges]. Here, subject to the orders of General Patrick, Provost Marshal General of the Army, it was engaged in constant service until 1 March, when it again re-joined the brigade. Colonel Cake received his first leave of absence since entering the service, in January 1863, resigned March 12, and his resignation was accepted on 2 May following. The command of the regiment then devolved on Lieutenant Colonel Lessig.

=== Chancellorsville Campaign ===
Towards the close of April, the army having been thoroughly re-organized under General Hooker, stood ready for the order to advance on the Chancellorsville campaign. To the Sixth Corps, now under command of General Sedgwick, was assigned the part to advance by way of Fredericksburg and Marye's Heights. At two o'clock on the afternoon of 28 April the brigade occupied Stafford Heights. On the night of the 29th, following closely Russell's Brigade, it passed over the Rappahannock at Franklin's Crossing, and with slight lose occupied the enemy's works on the Bernard Farm. On the morning of 3 May, the regiment was sent out by General Brooks to clear the front of the enemy's sharpshooters, who were annoying the Union artillerists posted beyond the Bowling Green Road, in front of the Bernard Mansion. This order was successfully executed, but not without stubborn resistance, the regiment losing five killed and eighteen wounded. After the capture of Marye's Heights-which was handsomely accomplished by Newton's and Howe's divisions-Brooks' Division, which had been held in reserve, now advanced,-with the exception of the 27th New York, left behind for guard and observation,-and took the lead in pursuit of the retreating enemy. In the vicinity of Salem Church, Bartlett's Brigade was drawn up, and advanced in line of battle on the left of the road, Torbert's Jersey Brigade on the right, Russell's Brigade, with the artillery, moving upon the road in reserve, ready to act as occasion might require. It was known that the enemy was in the woods beyond, but it was supposed to be the rear guard of his retreating column, and the information had been derived from rebel deserters, doubtless sent back to mislead the Union generals, that his trains had fallen into hopeless confusion and could be easily captured. Without stopping to shell the woods or develop the enemy's strength, Brooks' Division was pushed forward, on the very heels of the skirmishers, until it came suddenly upon three divisions of the rebel army,-most of which had been sent back from Chancellorsville,-drawn up in ambush, awaiting the advance of the Union column. The surprise was complete, and the division with its support was driven back, suffering grievous slaughter. The loss in the regiment, including that at the Bowling Green Road, was sixteen killed, fifty-seven wounded and twenty missing.

Lieutenant Alexander Allison was among the mortally wounded. Unable to hold the ground the corps retired by Banks' Ford, and at midnight of 4 May, the regiment bivouacked on the heights overlooking the ford. The Twenty-third New Jersey having been left to cover the ford and remove the pontoons, unable to accomplish the work, the Ninety-sixth was sent to take its place, and successfully performed the duty. Relieved by the cavalry on the 8th, it re-joined the brigade, and again went into camp near White Oak Church. About the middle of May, the term of service of the Sixteenth and Twenty-seventh New York regiments having expired, they were mustered out, and the Ninety-fifth Pennsylvania and Thirty-first New York, of Russell's command, were transferred to the brigade. A few days later General Brooks was ordered to the command of the Department of the Allegheny, headquarters at Pittsburgh, and General H. G. Wright succeeded him in command of the division.

=== Gettysburg Campaign ===
Early in June, great activity being manifested by the rebel army, the Sixth Corps was again ordered to cross the Rappahannock, for a reconnaissance in force. At two P.M. on the 6th, the brigade occupied Stafford Heights, and at evening passed over at Franklin's Crossing. Extensive earthworks were thrown up all along the line of the Bernard Plantation, from Deep Run Ravine to a point beyond the ruins of the Bernard Mansion. Continuous skirmishing was kept up with occasional artillery practice. From supporting the Fifth U.S. Battery, the regiment was sent on the 7th to picket the Deep Run Ravine. Here it remained under a continuous fire until relieved by the Forty-ninth, and One Hundred and Nineteenth Pennsylvania regiments, and late at night on the 10th it returned to Stafford Heights, where, on the following day, in presence of nearly the entire division, a beautiful silk flag, the gift of friends in Schuylkill County, was presented by a committee of citizens. Early on the morning of the 12th, the brigade was sent out on picket, covering the country from the Rappahannock nearly to the Potomac. At nine o'clock on the evening of the 13th the regiment was withdrawn from the picket line, and re-joining the brigade at White Oak Church, started on the ever memorable Gettysburg campaign. With only short intervals of rest the movement continued until the afternoon of July 2, when at the moment of great peril in the battle, as the veterans of Longstreet, massed upon the extreme left, were doubling up and driving the corps of Sickles, it arrived upon the field. Foot sore and weary, the men were at once formed, and with scarcely a moments rest, were pushed forward upon the right of the road leading out to the Peach Orchard, to a slight elevation, on the right and front of Little Round Top, and took position behind a stone fence which it held with slight loss until the close of the battle.

On the morning of 5 July the Sixth Corps started in pursuit of the enemy. Prisoners were taken at every turn, and the enemy's rear guard was closely pressed, compelling him to open frequently with his artillery. The sufferings in this pursuit were intense. The crossing of Cotoctin Mountain, along a by-road, at night, and in the midst of a terrific thunderstorm, will ever be remembered for its hardships. On the 10th the regiment, with two companies of the One Hundred and Twenty-first, skirmished in the advance along the Funkstown Road, and drove the rear of the enemy, after stubborn resistance, across the Antietam at Claggett's Mill. In this skirmish, and subsequently, while upon the picket line in front of Hagerstown, the regiment lost several wounded.

=== Veteranization and the Overland Campaign ===
Without coming to battle the enemy escaped into Virginia, and the Union army followed. After successive marching and countermarching, the brigade in the latter part of July, was detached from the division and sent to New Baltimore, where it was employed in picketing and scouting, and the usual rounds of drill and parade. On 4 September rebel guerrillas made a midnight descent upon General Bartlett's headquarters. The regiment was at the time on picket, and in the encounter three of its number were wounded, the enemy being quickly routed. On 15 September the command left New Baltimore, and moved to Warrenton, where it entered on Meade's Rapidan Campaign, returning from Centreville to the vicinity of Warrenton on 20 October. Here it remained until 7 November, when, with the command, it moved to Rappahannock Station, the brigade supporting Russell in the battle, which ensued. The loss was one severely, and several slightly wounded. The command went into camp near the confluence of the Aestham with the Rappahannock, and with the exception of the movement to Mine Run, and in support of the cavalry in the reconnaissance to Robertson's River, it remained in quarters here during the winter, a considerable number of the regiment re-enlisting, in the meantime, as veteran volunteers.

On 4 May 1864, the brigade broke up winter-quarters and crossing the Rapidan, joined in the Battle of the Wilderness. It was almost constantly engaged in skirmishing during the five succeeding days, and on 10 May took part in the charge of the twelve picked regiments of the Sixth Corps on the enemy's works. The loss in the command was very heavy, Captain Edward Thomas being among the mortally wounded. On the 12th, at the salient known as the Slaughter Pen, in front of Spotsylvania, the fragment of the regiment remaining, with the division decimated as it was, held the position from early dawn until late at night, exposed during the whole time to a fire of musketry, which for severity, has few parallels in the history of warfare. So incessant was the shower of missiles, that trees over a foot in diameter, were cut off by the constant stroke of bullets. The loss in this series of engagements was thirty-three killed, one hundred and thirteen wounded, and thirty-nine missing, of whom the greater part were subsequently ascertained to have been killed. Remaining in the vicinity until the 14th, under almost continuous fire, the command moved to Bleak Hill, where, as at Salem Church, the division was pushed against the enemy in force; but soon finding itself overpowered, rapidly retired, some of the general officers making a narrow escape.

=== Petersburg Campaign ===
Upon reaching Cold Harbor, the brigade to which the Second Connecticut Heavy Artillery had been added, stormed and carried a portion of the enemy's works in front of the Cold Harbor House, sustaining heavy loss. It was here that acting Adjutant John T. Hannum received his mortal wound. From Cold Harbor the brigade moved to the James, bivouacking on Taylor's Plantation, and moving hence by water to Bermuda Hundred. Crossing the Appomattox it moved up to the Petersburg front, arriving on 19 June. Here the regiment was employed in building breast works, picketing, sharpshooting, with occasional charges upon the enemy's works, involving sharp fighting. On the 29th it took part in the descent upon the Weldon Railroad, in which a considerable portion of the track was completely destroyed.

Remaining in front of Petersburg until July 10, the brigade, in company with a part of the corps, marched to City Point, whence it moved by transport to Washington. Upon its arrival it was at once put upon the track of Early, who, with a considerable body of the rebel army, was threatening Washington. With the Army of the Shenandoah the regiment participated in all the operations in the Valley up to September 22, when, its term of service had expired, leaving a battalion composed of the veterans and recruits, which was subsequently consolidated with the Ninety-fifth Regiment, it withdrew from the front at Strasburg, and took up the line of march for Harper's Ferry, convoying thither a train of ambulances filled with the wounded. Proceeding by way of Baltimore and Harrisburg it reached Pottsville on the 26th, and on the evening of that day received at the hands of the citizens, a most flattering public welcome. On 21 October, at Hestonville, in West Philadelphia, it was paid and finally mustered out of service.

Source: Bates, Samuel P. History of Pennsylvania Volunteers, 1861-5. vol. III. Harrisburg: B. Singerly, State Printer, 1869.

Battles Fought

- Battle at Gaines' Mill, Virginia, on 27 June 1862
- Battle at Crampton's Gap, Maryland, on 14 September 1862
- Battle at Antietam, Maryland, on 17 September 1862
- Battle at Chancellorsville, Virginia, on 3 May 1863
- Battle at Fredericksburg, Virginia, on 3 May 1863
- Battle at Salem Heights, Virginia, on 3 May 1863
- Battle at White Plains, Virginia, on 25 July 1863
- Battle at While On Picket on 5 September 1863
- Battle at Centreville, Virginia, on 16 October 1863
- Battle on 9 November 1863
- Battle on 19 November 1863
- Battle on 14 December 1863
- Battle at Wilderness, Virginia, on 5 May 1864
- Battle at Wilderness, Virginia, on 7 May 1864
- Battle at Spotsylvania Court House, Virginia, on 9 May 1864
- Battle at Spotsylvania Court House, Virginia, on 10 May 1864
- Battle at Spotsylvania Court House, Virginia, on 12 May 1864
- Battle at Spotsylvania Court House, Virginia, on 14 May 1864
- Battle at Spotsylvania, Virginia, on 18 May 1864
- nBattle at Spotsylvania Court House, Virginia, on 20 May 1864
- Battle at Cold Harbor, Virginia, on 1 June 1864
- Battle at Cold Harbor, Virginia, on 3 June 1864
- Battle on 8 June 1864
- Battle on 21 July 1864
- Battle on 21 August 1864

== Bibliography ==
- Bates, Samuel P., History of Pennsylvania Volunteers, 1861-5. (Harrisburg, Pennsylvania : B. Singerly State Printers, 1870), vol. 3.
- Pennsylvania at Gettysburg: Ceremonies at the Dedication of the Monuments (Harrisburg, Pennsylvania : State Printers, 1891), vol. 1.
- Ward, David A. "Of Battlefields and Bitter Feuds: The Ninety-sixth Pennsylvania Volunteers," Civil War Regiments, vol. 3, no. 3.
- Ward, David A. The 96th Pennsylvania Volunteers in the Civil War (Jefferson, NC : McFarland, 2018)
