= Kenneth C. Laudon =

American professor (1944–2019)

- Born: November 4, 1944
- Died: December 26, 2019 (aged 75); Croton-on-Hudson, New York
- Education: Stanford University; Columbia University
- Known for: Privacy; Information Systems; E-commerce
- Spouse: Jane Price Laudon
- Scientific career
- Fields: Information Systems; E-commerce; Privacy
- Workplaces: New York University

Kenneth C. Laudon (November 4, 1944 – December 26, 2019) was an American professor of Information Systems at the Stern School of Business at New York University.

== Life and work ==
Kenneth Laudon graduated from Stanford University and has a Ph.D from Columbia University.

Laudon's first book, Computers and Bureaucratic Reform: The Political Functions of Urban Information Systems (John Wiley and Sons, 1974) was an early study of the use of computers in government.

Laudon's second book, Communications Technology and Democratic Participation (Praeger Publishing, 1978) has been cited as a "pioneering work" on the impact of information technology on the development of different types of democracies.

Laudon's third book was Dossier Society: Value Choices in the Design of National Information Systems (Columbia University Press, 1986). In Dossier Society, Laudon argued that the design and uses of new computing and telecommunications systems, such as the Federal Bureau of Investigation National Computerized Criminal History System, were creating what he called a “dossier society” that would be increasingly based on a person’s data image.

Laudon subsequently authored an influential article, "Markets and Privacy" (Communications of the ACM, 1996). This article proposed that people should have a property right in their personal information, enabling them to sell that information, perhaps through a national information market. This article has been recognized as one of the first to suggest a propertization of information privacy as well as the institutional infrastructure that might be used to make such an information property rights system a reality. A follow-on paper published by the U.S. Department of Commerce National Telecommunications and Information Administration discusses how personal information might be priced. Laudon's work has recently been cited as a source for a proposal that Facebook create an information market and pay its users in exchange for their information or attitudes. Laudon is also the author a number of academic articles with respect to the impacts of information systems.

Professor Laudon is also well known as the co-author of a number of textbooks, including Management Information Systems: Managing the Digital Firm and E-commerce. Business. Technology. Society.

He died at his home in Croton-on-Hudson on December 26, 2019.

== See also ==
- Information Systems
- Management Information System (MIS)
- E-commerce
- Privacy
