= Hannah Tompkins (artist) =

American painter

- Born: January 17, 1920; New York City, United States
- Died: October 25, 1995 (aged 75); Clearwater, Florida, United States
- Known for: Painting, printmaking
- Movement: Cubism

Hannah Tompkins (January 17, 1920 – October 25, 1995) was an American artist primarily known for her large body of artwork based on the writings of William Shakespeare. A catalog listing of her Shakespeare themed oil paintings appears in Shakespeare in American Painting : A Catalogue from the Late Eighteenth Century to the Present by Richard Studing.

She began painting in earnest in the mid-1960s while teaching art at Ramapo Community College, Rockland County, New York. In 1979 she opened the Shambles Gallery in Santa Cruz, California and in 1984 opened the Shakespeare Art Museum in Ashland, Oregon.

== Background ==
Born in the Williamsburg slum in Brooklyn, New York to Russian and Polish Jewish immigrants, third youngest of eight children, Tompkins found her love of Shakespeare as an adolescent while residing in various foster homes after being placed as a baby in the Brooklyn Hebrew Orphan Asylum. In 1937 she graduated Girls Commercial High School in NYC with an Art Diploma. She became active in the progressive movement during the great depression and World War II during which she married artist Irving Fierstein. In 1948 the couple was instrumental in the development of Harmon Park in Croton-on-Hudson, New York. This was a community of ten families of artists, commercial artists and architects seeking a progressive and creative environment within a suburban lifestyle. It was here that they built a house and raised four children. After divorcing in 1964, Hannah embarked upon her life as an artist living respectively in Sloatsburg, New York; Ft. Lauderdale, Florida; Guadalajara, Mexico; Santa Cruz, California; Ashland, Oregon; and Clearwater, Florida. She continued creating artworks until her death from cancer at the age of 75.

== Exhibitions ==
A partial list of her exhibitions includes:

- 1964 - NYU Summer Theater, Tuxedo, New York; Tappan Zee Playhouse, Nyack, New York; with Selma Gubin at Sloatsburg Inn, Sloatsburg, New York; with group show Clarksville Galleries, West Nyack, New York; Carnegie Hall, NYC, New York
- 1965 - With group show Clarksville Galleries; one-woman show Sterling Forest, Tuxedo, New York; group show Rockland Community College, New York; one-woman show Ithaca College Music Bldg, New York; one-woman show Rockland Community College, New York
- 1967 - One-woman show Jordan Marsh, Ft. Lauderdale, Florida; one-woman show Parker Playhouse, Ft. Lauderdale, Florida
- 1968 - One-woman show Jordan Marsh, West Palm Beach, Florida
- 1969 - Las Olas Galleries, Ft. Lauderdale, Florida
- 1973 - Exhibits & lectures at the Univ of Texas (Austin); Bowmer Theater in Ashland, Oregon Shakespeare Festival; Newman Hall, Berkeley, California
- 1983 - Stevenson College Library, UC, Santa Cruz, California
