= Pennsylvania First Defenders =

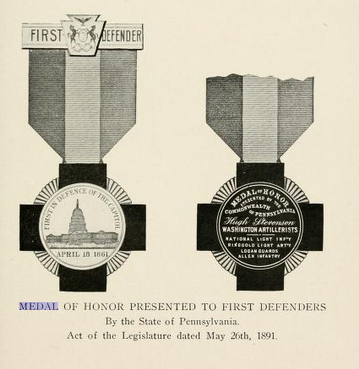
A Medal of Honor presented on May 26, 1891 to each of the Pennsylvania First Defenders

A June 15, 1892 letter from Samuel R. Russel to Colonel Oliver Bosbyshell regarding Pennsylvania First Defender uniforms and Bosbyshell's handwritten note of resolution at the letter's end

The Pennsylvania First Defenders were five volunteer troops from Pennsylvania that responded to U.S. President Abraham Lincoln’s call to defend the national capital in Washington, D.C., at the start of the American Civil War. Pennsylvania First Defenders included the National Light Infantry from Pottsville, Pennsylvania, the Washington Artillerists from Pottsville, Pennsylvania, the Ringgold Light Artillery from Reading, Pennsylvania, the Logan Guards from Lewistown, Pennsylvania, and the Allen Infantry from Allentown, Pennsylvania.

== History ==
After the Confederate States opened fire on Fort Sumter in the Battle of Fort Sumter on April 12, 1861, President Abraham Lincoln issued a proclamation on April 15, calling 75,000 militia to suppress the rebellion. The first volunteer troops reached Washington, D.C., on April 18, 1861, at 6:00 p.m. These first troops were the Pennsylvania First Defenders and consisted of 476 officers and men. The troops were quartered in hallways and committee rooms of the U.S. Senate and U.S. House of Representatives. At 9:00 p.m. the troops were brought into the basement of the U.S. Capitol, where they were distributed government arms and ammunition. President Lincoln, U.S. Secretary of State William H. Seward, and U.S. Secretary of War Simon Cameron were present as the arms were being distributed. Lincoln proceeded down the line and shook hands with every member of the companies.

== Casualties ==
En route to Washington, D.C., the troops boarded a train at Camden Station in Baltimore, Maryland, the largest city of that slave state. In a prelude to the Baltimore Riot of 1861, which occurred a day later, they were met with an angry mob of pro-South sympathizers who threw bricks and stones at them. Many of the men received serious wounds as a result of the confrontation. Among them was sixty-five-year-old Nicholas Biddle of the Washington Artillerists who is believed to be one of the first men to shed blood in the American Civil War. As an African American in uniform, Biddle likely stood out as an easy target to the Southerners and suffered a head wound which was serious enough to expose his bone.

== Recognition ==
In December 1864, members of the Washington Artillerists Frances P. Dewees and Samuel R. Russel wrote a letter to Congressman A. G. Curtin of Pennsylvania to outline the importance of the First Defenders' actions at the early stages of the war. They requested that the men of the First Defenders receive recognition in the form of an awarded medal. On May 26, 1891, the General Assembly of the Commonwealth of Pennsylvania made appropriation of $1,500 for such medals of honor. On the front of each bronze medal is the image of the Capitol and the words "First in Defence of the Capitol: April 18, 1861." On the back, each of the five First Defender companies are listed, followed by the inscription "Medal of Honor Presented by the Commonwealth of Pennsylvania", and the name of the respective soldier.
