= Renata Kunkel =

Polish composer

Renata Kunkel (born 1954) is a Polish composer. She was born in Gdańsk, and studied composition with Marian Borkowski and conducting with Ryszard Dudek and Elisabeth Kuyper at the Academy of Music in Warsaw.

== Works ==
Selected works include:

- Second String Quartet
- Symphony For Orchestra

Her music has been recorded and issued on media, including:

- Warszawska Jesień - 1988 - Warsaw Autumn Kronika Dźwiękowa - 1988, Vinyl, Polskie Nagrania Muza
