= Marie-Sophie Künkel =

German politician (born 1992)

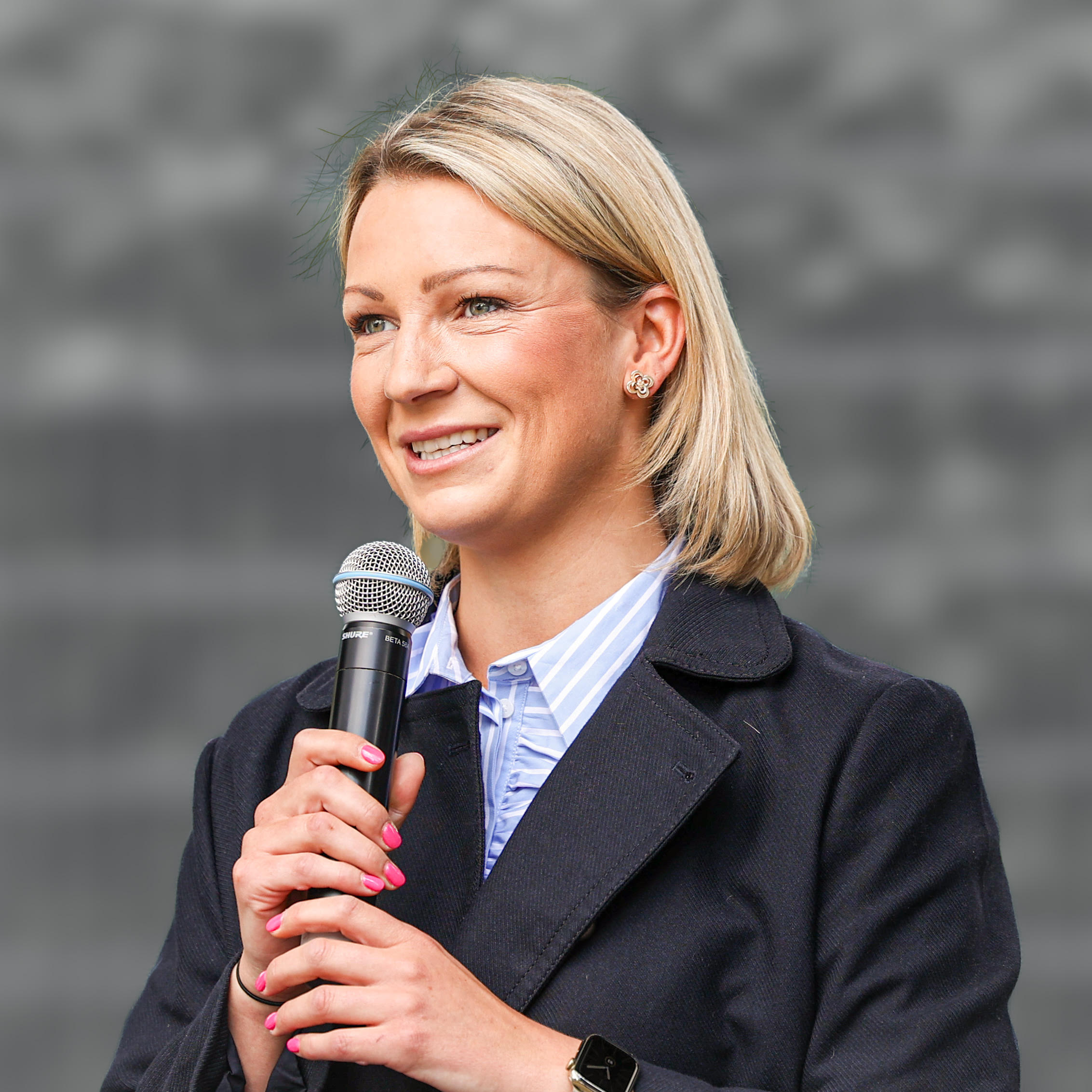
- Künkel in 2025

Member of the Landtag of Hesse
- Incumbent
- Assumed office 18 January 2024

Personal details
- Born: 19 July 1992 (age 34)
- Party: Christian Democratic Union

Marie-Sophie Künkel (born 19 July 1992) is a German politician serving as a member of the Landtag of Hesse since 2024. She has served as chairwoman of the Christian Democratic Union in Bad Endbach since 2019.
