= Elizabeth Kunkel House =

Historic house in West Virginia, United States

- U.S. National Register of Historic Places
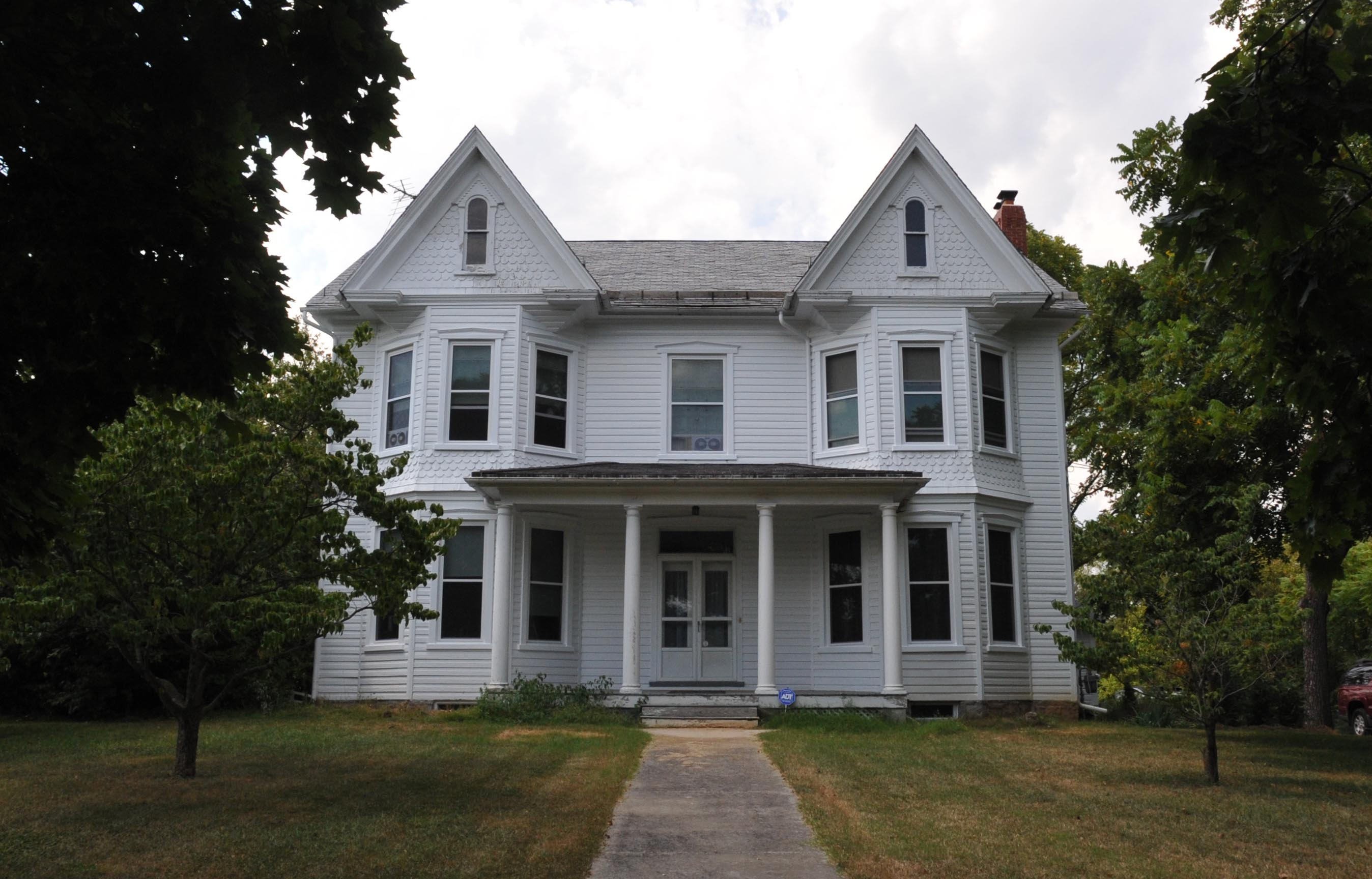

- Location within West Virginia Location within the United States
- Location: Western side of U.S. Route 11, 2.4 mi (3.9 km) north of Martinsburg, near Martinsburg, West Virginia
- Coordinates: 39°29′14″N 77°56′49″W
- Area: 1.2 acres (0.49 ha)
- Built: 1907
- Architectural style: Gothic
- NRHP reference No.: 91000557
- Added to NRHP: May 17, 1991

Elizabeth Kunkel House is a historic home located near Martinsburg, Berkeley County, West Virginia. It was built in 1907 and is a two-story, L-shaped, Late Victorian Gothic-style wood frame dwelling. It measures 40 feet wide and 50 feet deep, with a gable roof, and sits on a stone foundation. It features two steeply pitched Gothic dormers. Also on the property are an early-20th century frame smokehouse and storage building.

It was listed on the National Register of Historic Places in 1991.
