= John Christian Kunkel =

American politician

John C. Kunkel
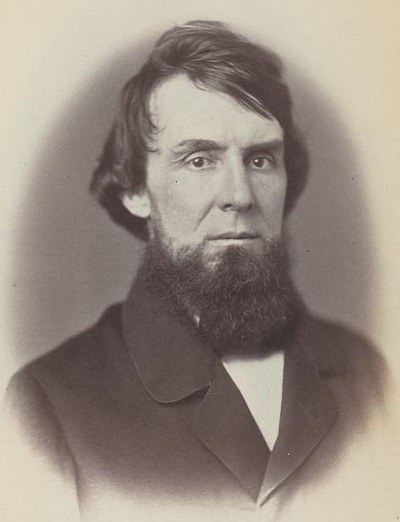
- From 1859's McClees' Gallery of Photographic Portraits of the Senators, Representatives & Delegates of the Thirty-Fifth Congress

Member of the U.S. House of Representatives from Pennsylvania's 10th district
- In office March 4, 1855 – March 3, 1859
- Preceded by: Ner Middleswarth
- Succeeded by: John W. Killinger

Personal details
- Born: September 18, 1816 Harrisburg, Pennsylvania, U.S.
- Died: October 14, 1870 (aged 54) Harrisburg, Pennsylvania, U.S.
- Party: Whig; Republican
- Education: Jefferson College; Carlisle Law School

John Christian Kunkel (September 18, 1816 – October 14, 1870) was a Whig and Republican member of the U.S. House of Representatives from Pennsylvania. He was the grandfather of John Crain Kunkel.

== Biography ==
He was born in Harrisburg, Pennsylvania. He attended the common schools of Gettysburg, Pennsylvania, and graduated from Jefferson College in Canonsburg, Pennsylvania (later Washington & Jefferson College in Washington, Pennsylvania). In 1839, he studied law at the Carlisle Law School. He was admitted to the Dauphin County bar in 1842 and commenced practice in Harrisburg. He gained a reputation as a public speaker, and during the presidential campaigns of 1844 he spoke much in favor of Henry Clay. He served in the Pennsylvania State House of Representatives in 1844, 1845, and again in 1850, and was a member of the Pennsylvania State Senate from 1851 to 1853. He served as speaker in 1852 and 1853.

Kunkel was elected as a Whig to the Thirty-fourth Congress, and reelected as a Republican to the Thirty-fifth Congress. He was chairman of the House Committee on Militia during the Thirty-fourth Congress. He was not a candidate for renomination in 1858. He is interred at Harrisburg Cemetery.

His cousin was the actor, singer, and theatre manager George Kunkel.

U.S. House of Representatives
| Preceded by Ner Middleswarth | Member of the U.S. House of Representatives from Pennsylvania's 10th congressional district 1855–1859 | Succeeded by John W. Killinger |
