= Henry Kunkel =

American immunologist (1916–1983)

Henry George Kunkel (September 9, 1916 in Brooklyn – 15 December 1983) was an American immunologist, known for his discoveries in basic immunology research, especially his contribution to the development of clinical immunology. He has been referred to as "the father of immunopathology."

== Background ==
Kunkel's father, Louis O. Kunkel, was a professor of plant pathology at the Rockefeller University. Kunkel grew up in Yonkers (New York) and Princeton. He studied at Princeton University (BA 1938) and Johns Hopkins University Medical School (MD 1942).

After working two years at Bellevue Hospital in New York, in 1944 he became a U.S. Navy doctor and took part in the landings in Italy. He started there for hepatitis diseases and interested to put this in the context of the U.S. Navy hepatitis research program, after the war he continued his work at the Rockefeller Institute and Hospital in New York City. In 1947, he became assistant researcher there, from 1949 to 1952 he served as a researcher, he spent the rest of his career at the Rockefeller University.

== Awards ==
- 1962 Gairdner Foundation International Award
- 1975 Passano Award
- 1975 Avery-Landsteiner Prize
- 1975 Albert Lasker Award for Basic Medical Research
- 1977 Louisa Gross Horwitz Prize of Columbia University
- 1979 Jessie Stevenson Kovalenko Medal
