= Carl Folta =

Carl Folta is executive vice president, corporate communications for Viacom. He has served at this post since November 2006. Before that, he served as executive vice president, Office of the chairman, from January 1, 2006, where he served as Sumner Redstone's senior adviser and spokesman. Previously, he was executive vice president, corporate relations of the former Viacom Inc., since November 2004. Prior to that, he served as senior vice president of corporate relations of Viacom from November 1994 to November 2004, and vice president of corporate relations of Viacom from April 1994 to November 1994. Folta held various communications positions at Paramount Communications from 1984 (when the company was known as Gulf+Western, retaining this name until 1989) until joining Viacom through its purchase of Paramount in April 1994.

In January 2003, Folta initiated KNOW HIV/AIDS, a cross-platform public education campaign by Viacom and CBS (which Viacom owned from 2000 to 2005) to fight HIV and AIDS. KNOW HIV/AIDS runs public service messages across CBS's and Viacom's TV, radio, and outdoor properties. The program has won both a Peabody Award and an Emmy Award.

== Education ==
In 1980, Folta received a B.S. from Boston University College of Communication and was presented with the school's Distinguished Alumni Award in 1998.
