= Louis Otto Kunkel =

American botanist (1884–1960)

Louis Otto Kunkel (May 7, 1884 – March 20, 1960) was an American botanist and plant pathologist who led the Division of Plant Pathology of the Rockefeller Institute for over two decades beginning in 1932. He was known for his work on viral diseases of potatoes, cabbage and other crops.

Born near Mexico, Missouri, he attended the University of Missouri, earning the degrees of B.S. (1903), A.B (1910) and M.A. (1911). He earned a PhD in 1914 from Columbia University, working with Robert A. Harper. He was elected into the National Academy of Sciences in 1932 and the American Philosophical Society in 1942.

The standard author abbreviation Kunkel is used to indicate this person as the author when citing a botanical name.
