= Yorktown, New York =

- Town
- Town of Yorktown
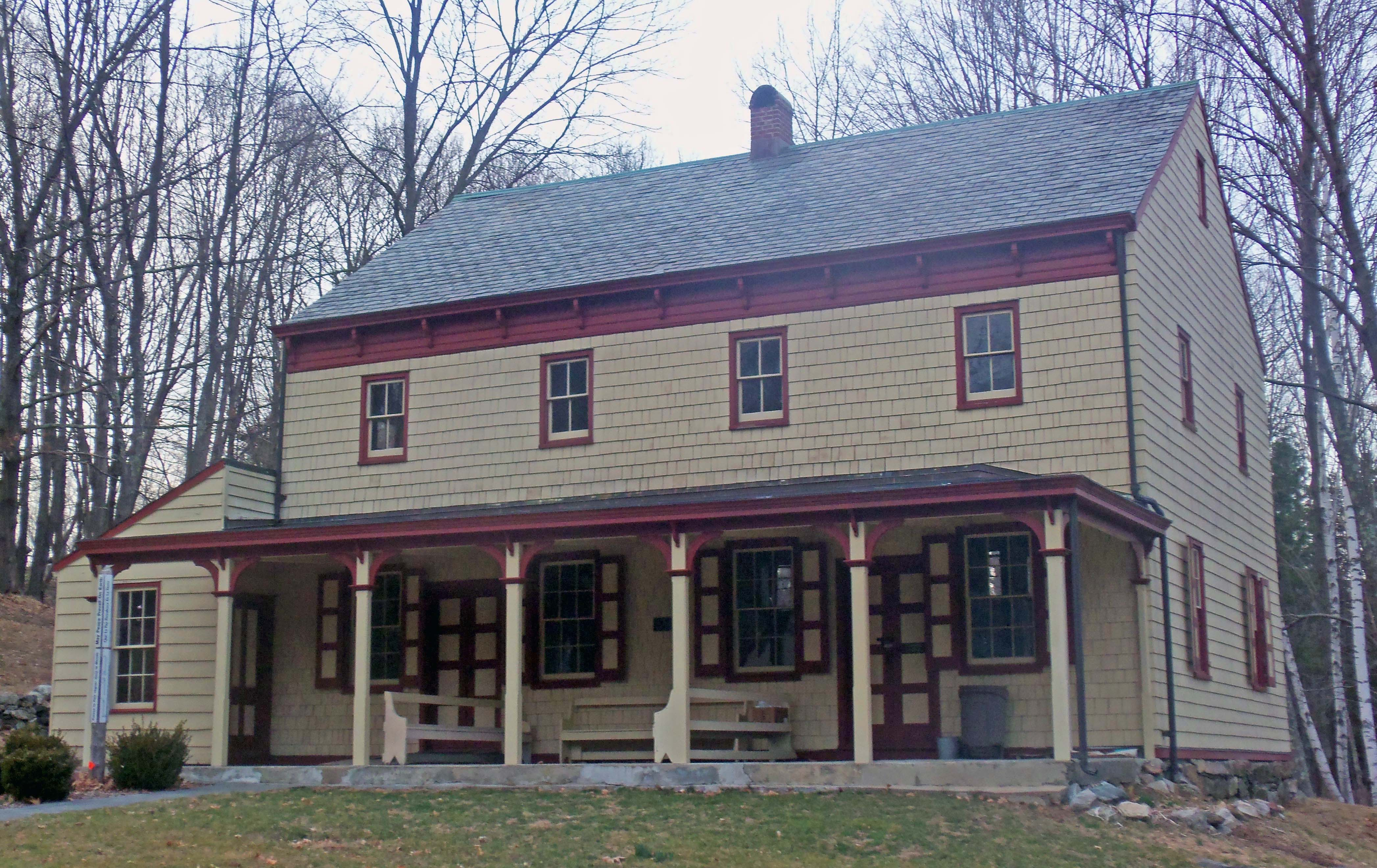
- Amawalk Friends Meeting House

- Flag
- Motto: Progress with Preservation
- Location of Yorktown, New York
- Coordinates: 41°16′56″N 73°48′33″W
- Country: United States
- State: New York
- County: Westchester

Government
  - Type: Town Council
  - Town Supervisor: Ed Lachterman (R)
  - Town Council: Sergio Esposito (R) Luciana Haughwout (R); Patrick Murphy (R) Susan Siegel (D)

Area
  - Total: 39.34 sq mi (101.90 km^{2})
  - Land: 36.76 sq mi (95.21 km^{2})
  - Water: 2.59 sq mi (6.70 km^{2})
- Elevation: 460 ft (140 m)

Population (2020)
  - Total: 36,569
  - Estimate (2022): 35,545
  - Density: 995/sq mi (384.1/km^{2})
- Time zone: UTC-5 (Eastern (EST))
  - Summer (DST): UTC-4 (EDT)
- ZIP code: 10598
- Area code: 914
- FIPS code: 36-84077
- GNIS feature ID: 0979663
- Website: https://www.yorktownny.gov/

Yorktown is a town on the northern border of Westchester County, New York, United States. A suburb of the New York City metropolitan area, it is approximately 38 miles (61 km) north of midtown Manhattan. The population was 36,569 at the 2020 U.S. Census.

== History ==
Yorktown has a rich historical heritage. The area was originally inhabited by one or more bands of Wappinger people, including the Kitchawank. Most of Yorktown, then called Hanover, was part of the Van Cortlandt Manor, a royal manor granted by King William III for the Van Cortlandt family.

The Croton River, which runs through the southern part of Yorktown, was dammed by the New York City water supply system to provide the city with its first major source of clean and reliable water. The first Croton Dam was located in Yorktown and broke in 1842, causing significant damage to property and major loss of life.

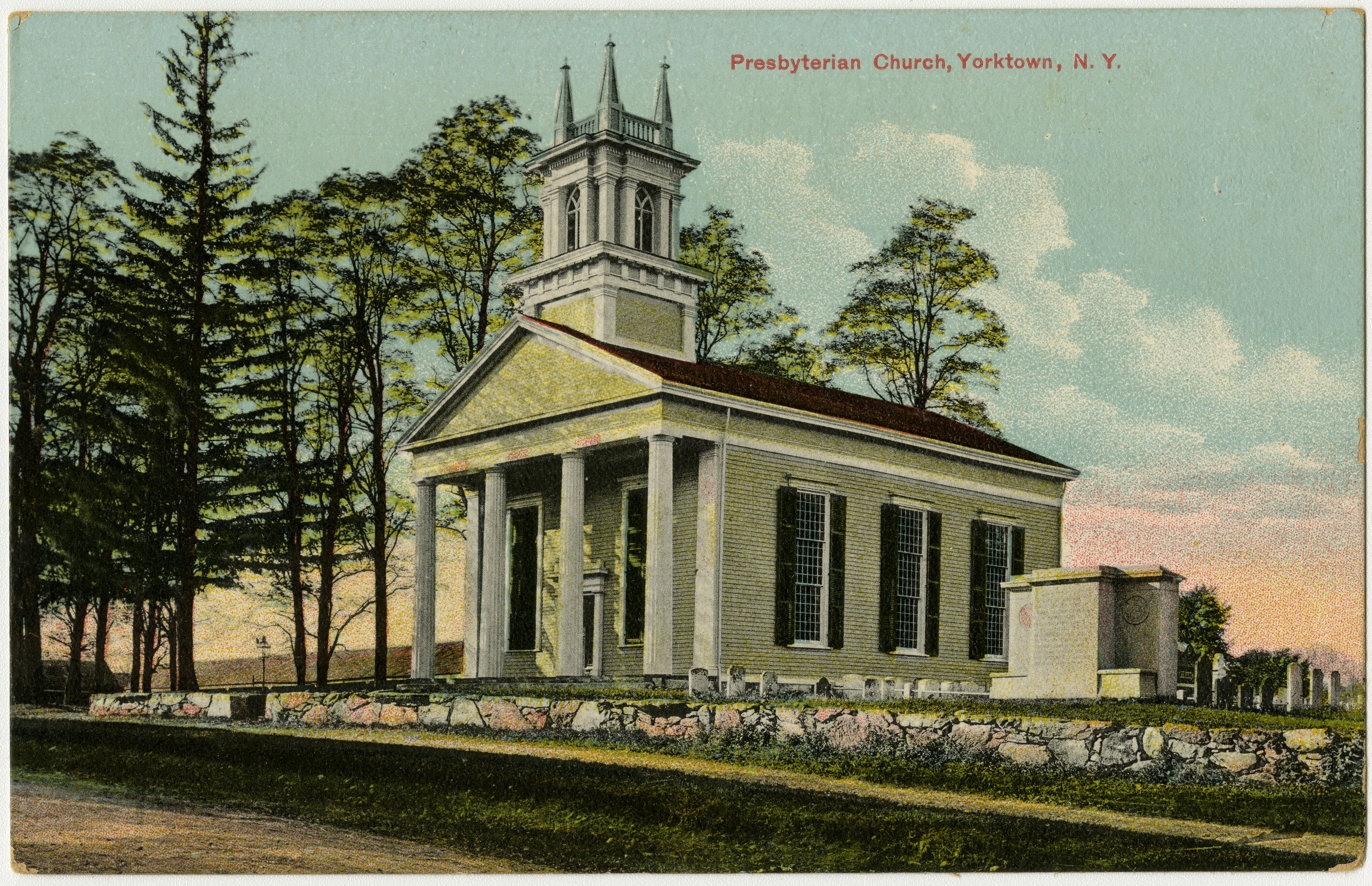
First Presbyterian Church of Yorktown in Crompond

During the American Revolution, the Hanover area saw limited action. Late in the war, the Pine's Bridge crossing of the Croton River was guarded by the 1st Rhode Island Regiment made up of White, African American, and Native American soldiers. Several of the soldiers were killed, including the regiment's commander, Colonel Christopher Greene, on May 14, 1781, at the Battle of Pine's Bridge in Croton Heights. A memorial was erected at the First Presbyterian Church in Yorktown Heights. Major John André, a British officer who communicated with Benedict Arnold, ate his final breakfast at the Underhill House at 370 Underhill Avenue on Hanover Street just before his capture and eventual hanging as a spy.

In 1788, the township was officially incorporated as Yorktown, commemorating the Revolutionary War victory of the Franco-American siege of Yorktown, near Yorktown, Virginia, on October 19, 1781. (The original name, Hanover, was a tribute to the British monarchy, specifically the House of Hanover and King George III, an association which became unwanted after the Revolution.)

Moving north after the battle of Yorktown, the French army camped at the site of today's French Hill Elementary School, where cannonballs and other relics have been found.

== Geography ==
The town's northern border is the Town of Putnam Valley in Putnam County. Its eastern border is the Town of Somers. Its southern border is the Town of New Castle. Its western border is the Town of Cortlandt.

According to the United States Census Bureau, the town has a total area of 39.3 square miles (102 km^{2}), of which 36.8 square miles (95 km^{2}) is land and 2.6 square miles (6.7 km^{2}), or 6.57%, is water.

=== Climate ===
Climate data for Yorktown Heights, New York
Month	Jan	Feb	Mar	Apr	May	Jun	Jul	Aug	Sep	Oct	Nov	Dec	Year
Record high °F (°C)	67 (19)	73 (23)	85 (29)	95 (35)	94 (34)	94 (34)	100 (38)	100 (38)	95 (35)	87 (31)	79 (26)	73 (23)	100 (38)
Mean daily maximum °F (°C)	35.5 (1.9)	38.6 (3.7)	46.8 (8.2)	59.7 (15.4)	69.6 (20.9)	78.0 (25.6)	83.0 (28.3)	81.1 (27.3)	74.4 (23.6)	62.5 (16.9)	51.4 (10.8)	40.8 (4.9)	60.1 (15.6)
Mean daily minimum °F (°C)	16.7 (−8.5)	17.9 (−7.8)	25.4 (−3.7)	35.9 (2.2)	47.8 (8.8)	55.2 (12.9)	60.8 (16.0)	59.3 (15.2)	51.9 (11.1)	40.9 (4.9)	31.5 (−0.3)	23.3 (−4.8)	38.9 (3.8)
Record low °F (°C)	−15 (−26)	−10 (−23)	0 (−18)	14 (−10)	30 (−1)	38 (3)	46 (8)	39 (4)	32 (0)	20 (−7)	11 (−12)	−9 (−23)	−15 (−26)
Average precipitation inches (mm)	3.72 (94)	3.06 (78)	4.10 (104)	3.89 (99)	3.91 (99)	5.00 (127)	4.32 (110)	4.28 (109)	4.80 (122)	4.61 (117)	4.24 (108)	4.37 (111)	50.30 (1,278)
Average snowfall inches (cm)	8.8 (22)	12.6 (32)	8.2 (21)	1.8 (4.6)	0 (0)	0 (0)	0 (0)	0 (0)	0 (0)	0 (0)	0.5 (1.3)	7.6 (19)	39.50 (100.3)
Average precipitation days	11.1	8.6	10.5	11.1	11.6	11.3	10.3	9.9	8.9	9.4	9.1	10.5	122.3
Average snowy days	5.2	4.1	3.3	0.4	0	0	0	0	0	0	0.5	3.4	16.9
Source: NOAA

== Demographics ==
Historical population
Census	Pop.	Note	%±
1790	1,609		—
1820	1,991		—
1830	2,141		7.5%
1840	2,819		31.7%
1850	2,273		−19.4%
1860	2,231		−1.8%
1870	2,625		17.7%
1880	2,481		−5.5%
1890	2,378		−4.2%
1900	2,421		1.8%
1910	3,020		24.7%
1920	1,441		−52.3%
1930	2,724		89.0%
1940	3,642		33.7%
1950	4,731		29.9%
1960	16,453		247.8%
1970	28,064		70.6%
1980	31,988		14.0%
1990	33,467		4.6%
2000	36,318		8.5%
2010	36,081		−0.7%
2020	36,569		1.4%
2022 (est.)	35,545		−2.8%
U.S. Decennial Census

As of the United States Census of 2000, there were 36,318 people, 12,556 households, and 9,831 families residing in the town. The population density was 989.7 inhabitants per square mile (382.1/km^{2}). There were 12,852 housing units at an average density of 350.2 units per square mile (135.2 units/km^{2}). The racial makeup of the town was 90.64% White, 3.04% African American, 0.14% Native American, 3.44% Asian, 0.01% Pacific Islander, 1.30% from other races and 1.43% from two or more races. Hispanic or Latino of any race were 5.82% of the population.

There were 12,556 households, out of which 40.9% had children under the age of 18 living with them, 69.1% were married couples living together, 7.1% had a female householder with no husband present, and 21.7% were non-families. 19.0% of all households were made up of individuals, and 10.0% had someone living alone who was 65 years of age or older. The average household size was 2.83 and the average family size was 3.26.

In the town, the population was spread out, with 27.6% under the age of 18, 5.4% from 18 to 24, 28.5% from 25 to 44, 25.2% from 45 to 64, and 13.3% who were 65 years of age or older. The median age was 39 years. For every 100 females, there were 93.0 males. For every 100 females age 18 and over, there were 88.9 males.

The median income for a household in the town was $133,819, and the median income for a family was $154,984 (these figures had risen to $137,253 and $159,413 respectively as of a 2014 estimate). Males had a median income of $96,071 versus $75,899 for females. The per capita income for the town was $63,570. About 1.1% of families and 1.4% of the population were below the poverty line, including 3.3% of those under age 18 and 4.3% of those age 65 or over.

For the 2010 census, the results showed 87.9% White, 3.3% African-American, 0.1% American Indian, 4.7% Asian, 9.4% Latino.

Some of Yorktown's multiple ethnic groups, nationalities and religious communities are, for example, Italians, Mexicans and American Jews. There is an annual feast of San Gennaro represents the Italian community. Also there are Irish, Japanese and African-Americans, among others.

== Government ==
Yorktown is governed by a five-member town board. It determines policy and is the branch of government that appropriates funds for governmental functions and services. The Board is composed of four Council members, who are elected for a four-year term, and the Supervisor who is elected for a two-year term. Terms are staggered. Two Council positions are elected at each biennial election.

=== Politics ===
United States presidential election results for Yorktown
Year	Republican		Democratic		Third party(ies)	
Year	No.	%	No.	%	No.	%
2016	9140	47.99%	9073	47.63%	834	4.38%
2020	10244	47.40%	11099	51.35%	270	1.25%

== Communities and locations in Yorktown ==
The town is made up of five business hamlets: Mohegan Lake, Shrub Oak, Jefferson Valley, Crompond, and Yorktown Heights, and twelve historical residential neighborhoods each with their own unique character and identity.

Hamlets

- Mohegan Lake
- Shrub Oak
- Jefferson Valley-Yorktown
- Crompond (partially in the town of Cortlandt)
- Yorktown Heights

Historical Neighborhoods

- Copper Beech/Oakside
- Croton Heights
- Manhattan Park
- Crow Hill
- Huntersville/Hunterbrook
- Kitchawan/Pinesbridge
- Franklin D. Roosevelt State Park (formerly Mohansic Park)
- Quarry/Stony Street
- Sparkle Lake/Cottage Farms
- Teatown (not completely in the town of Yorktown)
- Turkey Hill/Underhill Heights
- Yorkhill/Amawalk Nursery
- Yorktown

== Education ==
The Town of Yorktown is served by four school districts: Yorktown Central School District, Lakeland Central School District, Croton-Harmon Union Free School District, and Ossining Union Free School District.

The Yorktown School District encompasses a large part of the Town of Yorktown and small sections of Cortlandt and New Castle. The district includes two, grade K-3 elementary schools; one, grade 4-5 elementary school; one, grade 6-8 middle school; and one grade 9-12 high school.

Lakeland is a suburban school district located in the Northwest corner of Westchester County and includes parts of six towns: Yorktown, Cortlandt, and Somers in Westchester County; Carmel, Philipstown, and Putnam Valley in Putnam County. Lakeland includes five grade K-5 elementary schools, one grade 6-8 middle school, and two grade 9-12 high schools, as well as the Lakeland Alternative High School.

The Croton-Harmon School District encompasses parts of the towns of Cortlandt, Yorktown, and Ossining and includes the village of Croton-on-Hudson. The district population is approximately 15,000 with some 1,700 students attending Croton schools this year. The district includes one, grade K-4 elementary school; one, grade 5-8 middle school; and one, grade 9-12 high school.

The Ossining Union Free School District encompasses parts of the towns of Yorktown, New Castle, Briarcliff Manor, Ossining, and the Village of Ossining. The district includes the Park Early childhood center, which houses three programs: First Steps for Ossining families with children ages 0 to 4, Pre-Kindergarten for four year-olds and Kindergarten, one grade 1-2 elementary school, one, grade 3-4 elementary school, one grade 5 elementary school, one grade 6-8 middle school, and one grade 9-12 high school.

== Economy ==
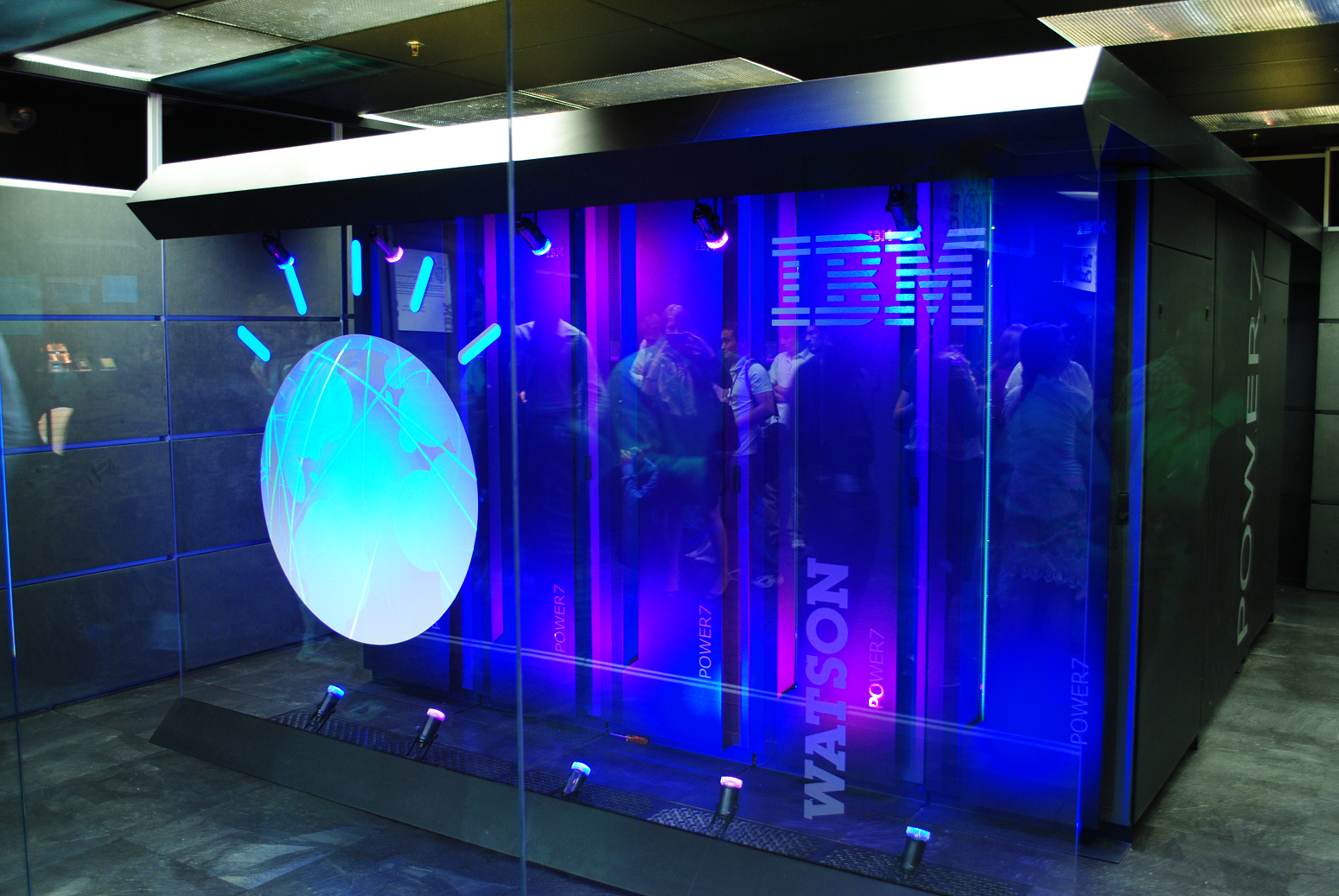
IBM's Watson computer at the Thomas J. Watson Research Center

The main site of the IBM Thomas J. Watson Research Center is located in the Kitchawan part of Yorktown.

The headquarters for Contractors Register is located in the Hamlet of Jefferson Valley. Contractors Register publishes The Blue Book of Building and Construction.

Regional bank PCSB Bank is headquartered in Yorktown Heights.

Jefferson Valley Mall, the area's major shopping center, is located in Yorktown, in the hamlet of Jefferson Valley.

== Parks ==
Parks in Yorktown includes several state parks: Donald J. Trump State Park (with north and south sections), sold to the state at a discount by Donald Trump, and Franklin D. Roosevelt State Park. There are also many local parks: Downing Park, Granite Knolls Park, Hilltop Hanover Farm & Environmental Center, Kitchawan Preserve, part of the North County Trailway (now also known as the Empire State Trailway), Patriot Park, Railroad Park, Sylvan Glen Park Preserve, Teatown Lake Reservation (partially in the towns of Cortlandt and New Castle), Turkey Mountain Nature Preserve, and Woodlands Legacy Fields Park.

== Rail stops ==
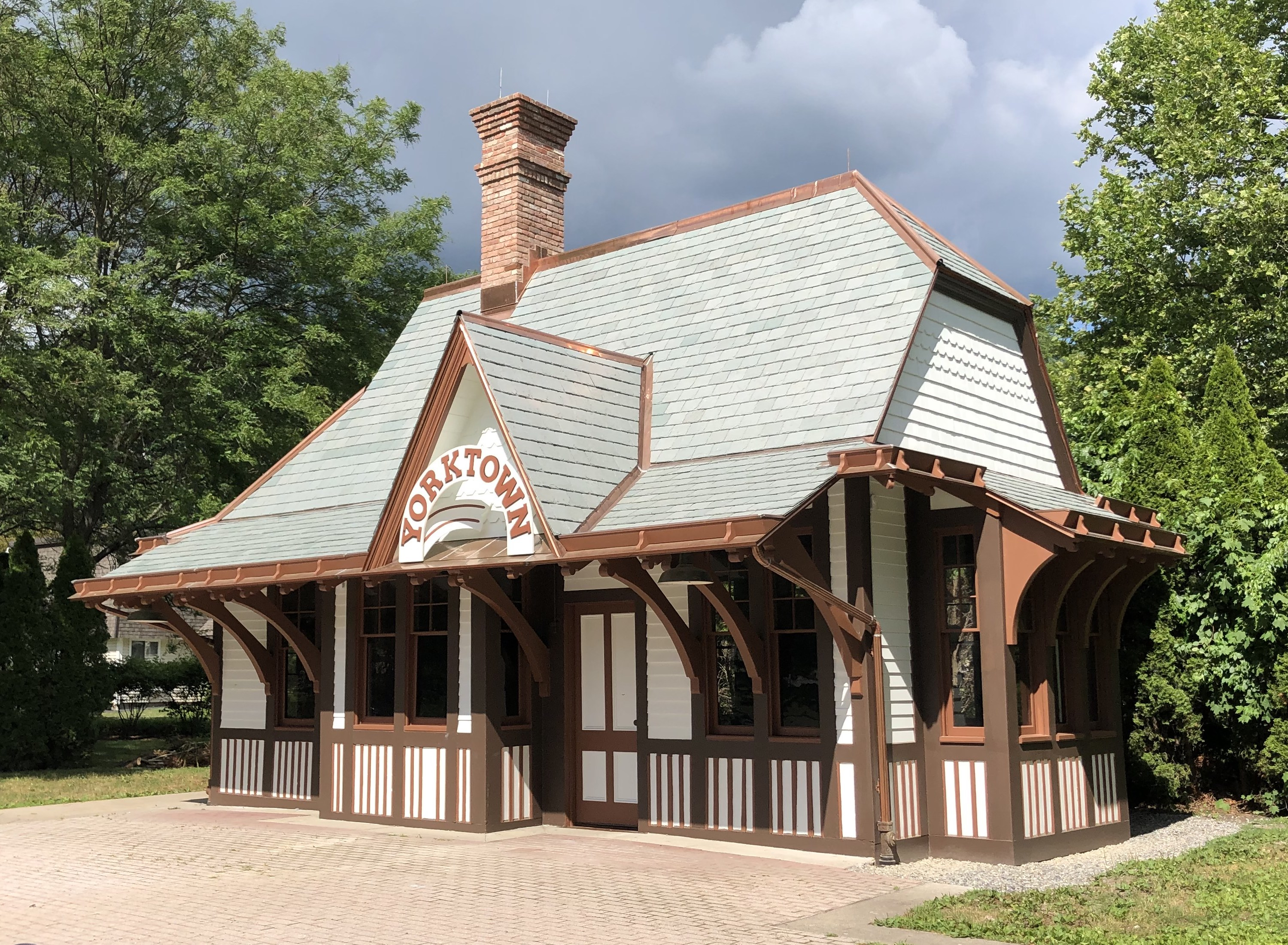
The Tudor Revival Yorktown Heights station

Yorktown once had five stations along the New York and Putnam Railroad — Kitchawan, Croton Lake, Croton Heights, Yorktown Heights, and Amawalk. The railroad was purchased by the New York Central Railroad, and ran into the early 1960s, when changes in vacation patterns impacting the numerous resort hotels further upline in Lake Mahopac and the dominant car culture killed the rail service. The old right of way is now part of the North County Trailway, which runs north as far as Carmel, New York. There is currently no rail service in Yorktown, but there are multiple Metro-North Railroad stations nearby, in Katonah in the east on the Harlem Line and Peekskill on the Hudson Line.

One of the New York Central stations was restored and today serves as the centerpiece of a small town park.

== Events ==
- Feast of San Gennaro
- Yorktown Grange Fair
- Battle of Yorktown, a litter cleanup initiative held annually in April
- Greasestock, a yearly festival showcasing alternative fuel vehicles.

== Notable people ==
- Roy Colsey, Major League Lacrosse player, grew up in Yorktown
- Nargis Fakhri, Bollywood actress, owns a house in Yorktown
- Susan Faludi, American feminist, journalist, author, and Pulitzer Prize-winner grew up in Yorktown
- Charlie Gasparino, American financial journalist
- Robert Hannsen, convicted Russian spy, lived with his family in Yorktown in the mid-1980s
- Margaret Illington, stage actress popular in the first decade of the 20th century, lived on her Dreamlake estate in Yorktown
- Consuelo Kanaga, photographer and writer who became well known for her photographs of African-Americans
- Andrew Kavovit, actor, grew up in Yorktown
- Dave Matthews, singer/songwriter, lived with his family in Yorktown before he moved to Virginia
- William Keepers Maxwell Jr., fiction editor for The New Yorker and novelist
- Terrence Murphy, former New York State Senator
- Alexandria Ocasio-Cortez, Congresswoman, born in NYC, but moved to Yorktown when she was five and later attended Yorktown High School
- Buster Olney, ESPN baseball analyst and former New York Yankees beat writer
- Clifford A. Pickover, writer; in his book, The Mobius Strip he models the fictional New Devonshire on Yorktown, also used the Jefferson Valley Mall as the locale for his book The Heaven Virus.
- Al Roker, meteorologist, lived in Yorktown while he was married to the town clerk, Alice Bell
- Anthony "Romeo" Santos, Dominican-American singer, songwriter, actor, record producer, and lead vocalist of the American bachata band Aventura
- Lawrence Treat, mystery writer and pioneer of the genre of novels police procedurals
- Halsey (H.W.) Wilson, founder of the H. W. Wilson Company, a publisher, lived in the Croton Heights section of Yorktown
- Dan Scavino, former general manager of Trump National Golf Club Westchester; Deputy Chief of Staff and head of personnel for the 2nd Trump administration, and long-time aide to Donald Trump
