= Jefferson Valley, New York =

Jefferson Valley-Yorktown, New York
- Census-designated place
- Location of Jefferson Valley, New York
- Coordinates: 41°19′1″N 73°48′6″W
- Country: United States
- State: New York
- County: Westchester
- Town: Yorktown

Area
  - Total: 7.05 sq mi (18.27 km^{2})
  - Land: 6.96 sq mi (18.02 km^{2})
  - Water: 0.097 sq mi (0.25 km^{2})

Population (2020)
  - Total: 14,444
  - Density: 2,075.6/sq mi (801.39/km^{2})
- Time zone: UTC-5 (Eastern (EST))
  - Summer (DST): UTC-4 (EDT)
- ZIP code: 10535
- Area code: 914
- FIPS code: 36-38500

Jefferson Valley-Yorktown, commonly known as Jefferson Valley, is a census-designated place (CDP) located in the town of Yorktown in Westchester County, New York, United States. The population was 14,142 at the 2010 census. It is a hot spot for local shoppers, due to its Jefferson Valley Mall.

== Geography ==
The Jefferson Valley-Yorktown CDP is located at 41°19′1″N 73°48′6″W (41.316874, -73.801722). The hamlet of Jefferson Valley is in the northeast part of the CDP, along U.S. Route 6, while the hamlet of Yorktown is in the south, at the junction of New York State Route 132 (Old Yorktown Road) with U.S. Route 202/State Route 35 (Crompond Road). The Taconic Parkway forms the western border of the CDP, while the Somers town line is the eastern border. The northern border follows the Westchester-Putnam County line.

According to the United States Census Bureau, the CDP has a total area of 7.0 square miles (18 km^{2}), of which 6.9 square miles (18 km^{2}) is land and 0.1 square miles (0.26 km^{2}), or 1.14%, is water.

== Demographics ==
Historical population
Census	Pop.	Note	%±
2020	14,444		—
U.S. Decennial Census

At the 2000 census there were 14,891 people, 5,420 households, and 4,151 families in the CDP. The population density was 2,154.2 inhabitants per square mile (831.7/km^{2}). There were 5,526 housing units at an average density of 799.4 per square mile (308.7/km^{2}). The racial makeup of the CDP was 92.31% White, 2.33% African American, 0.11% Native American, 3.22% Asian, 0.01% Pacific Islander, 1.06% from other races, and 0.96% from two or more races. Hispanic or Latino of any race were 4.69%.

Of the 5,420 households 38.0% had children under the age of 18 living with them, 68.8% were married couples living together, 6.3% had a female householder with no husband present, and 23.4% were non-families. 21.4% of households were one person and 14.7% were one person aged 65 or older. The average household size was 2.74 and the average family size was 3.22.

The age distribution was 26.6% under the age of 18, 4.8% from 18 to 24, 26.7% from 25 to 44, 25.1% from 45 to 64, and 16.7% 65 or older. The median age was 41 years. For every 100 females, there were 89.4 males. For every 100 females age 18 and over, there were 85.1 males.

The median household income was $82,379 and the median family income was $96,089. Males had a median income of $65,585 versus $46,373 for females. The per capita income for the CDP was $34,347. About 1.4% of families and 2.5% of the population were below the poverty line, including 3.1% of those under age 18 and 4.3% of those age 65 or over.

== Education ==
Yorktown Central School District includes the southern portion of the Jefferson Valley-Yorktown census-designated place, while Lakeland Central School District has the northern portion.
