= Hudson Valley Islamic Community Center =

Mosque in New York State, United States

Coordinates: 41.326271°N 73.859506°W

The Hudson Valley Islamic Community Center (HVICC) was founded by the local Muslim community in the Mohegan Lake area of Westchester County, New York. The current property was acquired on May 15, 2006. It features 7 acres of land and a 50,000 square foot Islamic Center.
