= Jessica Lynn =

American singer and songwriter (born 1990)

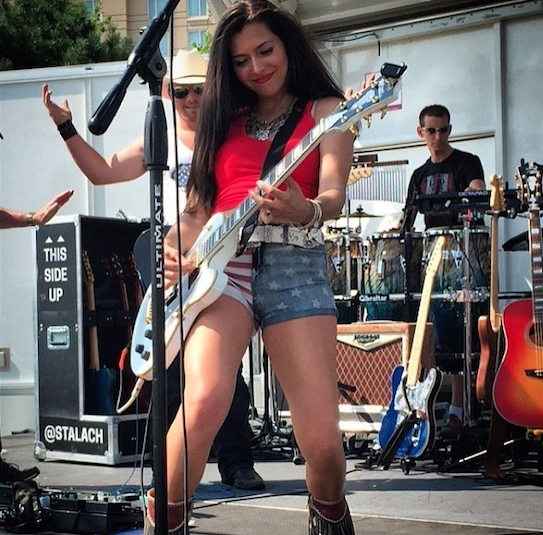
- Lynn in 2018

Background information
- Born: 1990 (age 35–36); New York City, New York, U.S.
- Genre: Country
- Occupations: Singer, songwriter, entertainer
- Instruments: Lead vocals, guitar, piano, drums
- Years active: 2006–present
- Label: Daydreamer
- Website: www.jessicalynnmusic.org

Jessica Lynn (born January 6, 1990) is a country music singer and songwriter.

== Early life and education ==
Lynn was born in the Brooklyn borough of New York City, and grew up in Westchester County, New York, attending Lakeland High School in Shrub Oak. While in college at Pace University in nearby Pleasantville, New York, Lynn received a bachelor's degree in adolescent education and mathematics and a master's degree in special education and graduated with honors while being a member of the mathematics honor society Kappa Mu Epsilon.

== Career ==
In her early teens, Lynn formed her first band and began performing professionally throughout Manhattan. She began playing the piano in middle school and taught herself the guitar and drums in high school.

At sixteen, Lynn penned a song about Alzheimer's disease, titled "Your Favorite Stranger," which aided in her becoming a published ASCAP writer in the same year. Lynn performed "Your Favorite Stranger" on her father's nationwide PBS television special, Cal - Forever and Beyond...Live In Concert, which was a No. 2 ranked PBS concert.

In 2014, she appeared on television in Jessica Lynn: This Much Fun – Live from the Winery at St. George. In the summer of 2014 she performed at the Country Jam USA, Headwaters Country Jam, and Taste of Country Festival. Lynn was signed to Round Hill Music in 2014 by Jonnie "Most" Davis as a songwriter and artist where she traveled to Nashville, Tennessee to write and record with some of the most influential songwriters and producers in the industry, such as Clay Mills, Wade Kirby, Trey Bruce, Rachel Proctor, Mike Mobley, Bryan White, and Greg Bieck.

In 2015, in support of her second PBS television special, Lynn went on her second nationwide tour, sharing the bill with major country music talent, such as Keith Urban, Thompson Square, and Clint Black. Lynn also went on tour with country music artist Jo Dee Messina.

In 2016, Lynn performed with country music artist and songwriter Phil Vassar at Ridgefield, Connecticut's Ridgefield Playhouse. Lynn also released her first single and music video, "Not Your Woman," which is the lead single off her debut self-titled studio EP. The single spent four weeks at No. 1 on the Iceman's chart, which is the only New Country Countdown show listed and recognized in the Country Music Association's Industry Guide.

Lynn's third national tour was in the summer of 2016 where she performed with country music icons Trace Adkins, Shenandoah, and Loretta Lynn, preceded by her first international tour, where she headlined the American Journeys festival in Cambrai, France.

Lynn spent the summer of 2017 overseas, once again, where she performed in several countries throughout Europe. During the international tour, she opened for ZZ Top and performed alongside Kenny Wayne Shepherd, Dokken, and Extreme. It was during this trip that she introduced her new EP, Look At Me That Way to the world.

Following the release of Look At Me That Way, Lynn released her second single to radio, "Crazy Idea." To date, Lynn's single has peaked at No. 48 on Nashville's Music Row chart, spotlighting the indie artist among some of the genre's most recognizable names. The "Crazy Idea" followup single, "Let’s Don’t," written with Nashville hit writers Clay Mills and Joey Ebach, was released in 2018 and charted at No. 38. In 2020, Lynn released another new single, "Run To," which immediately charted Top 10 on iTunes Country in Austria and Italy and Top 100 in the United Kingdom. Since then, Jessica has garnered 17 charting singles in 19 different countries within the last few years.

Despite the COVID-19 pandemic, Lynn continued to work. In addition to her 2020 single releases charting all over the world, her music was featured by Billboard, American Songwriter, CMT, Taste of Country, and many more of today's top music and entertainment publications worldwide. Lynn also became a cover girl, gracing the covers of both Guitar Girl Magazine, and the biggest international country music magazine, Maverick Magazine. Being unable to tour due to pandemic restrictions in both 2020 and 2021, Lynn also turned all of her touring online, resulting in livestream concerts that have charted every week on Pollstar's livestream chart and landed her a Top 40 spot in their Top 100 list of Livestreamers of 2020 as well as a spot in the Top 25 Livestreamers of 2021.

In 2020, Lynn was also employed by the United States Department of State’s Bureau of Educational and Cultural Affairs as a consultant to their American Voices program and a member of American Music Abroad, which has her traveling to countries across the globe as an ambassador for the U.S., spreading U.S. music and culture. Due to the success of Jessica's involvement with American Music Abroad as an artist, she was asked to create her own course titled "Tips & Tricks for The Independent Musician" for the government's YES Academy. She now teaches aspiring musicians of all ages globally how to embrace an entrepreneurial mindset to build their own successful and profitable careers in the arts.

Lynn's debut studio album Lone Rider, was released on September 9, 2022. On release weekend, Lone Rider hit the top of the charts. On Amazon Music, as the only female and independent artist in the Top 5, Jessica reached the #1 spot in both the USA & UK, as well as #5 all genre in the US and #3 in the UK. On iTunes, the release also charted in the US at #5 in country music and #17 all genre, as well as broke the Top 20 in Canada and the Top 50 in Belgium. Furthermore, in Lone Rider's debut week, the record charted at #41 on the Top Current Country Albums Chart by Music Connect / Billboard securing Jessica's spot as the only independent artist in the Top 45.

To celebrate her musical successes with fans around the world, Lynn has scheduled a headlining tour for 2023 that will include over 14 countries around the globe.

The U.S. Embassy in Kathmandu hosted Lynn for a week-long exchange, organized by the U.S. State Department Bureau of Educational and Cultural Affairs, with Nepali musicians in August 2026.

=== Video games ===
In April 2021, she provided her speaking voice for British filmmaker Joseph Marshall's 50 minute animated film Crash Bandicoot: The Crystal Crisis based on the video game franchise of the same name. The character she portrayed was Pasadena O'Possum who originally appeared in Crash Tag Team Racing but was also an unlockable character in Crash Team Racing: Nitro Fueled. Her 2017 song "After Party" is also featured in a 2018 trailer for the video game American Truck Simulator.

=== Television specials ===
Following Lynn's 2014 PBS special, Jessica Lynn: This Much Fun – Live from the Winery at St. George, and its success, she was invited to return to the network with a 2015 program. Lynn filmed and recorded her second PBS television special Jessica Lynn - Takin’ Over: Live at The Paramount, which aired nationwide that same year, making its debut in her home state on PBS WNET. Lynn was also featured on the CBS Evening News. In 2020, Lynn's third television special, Jessica Lynn Live at Dramatic Hall, aired on PBS. Both "Takin' Over" and "Live at Dramatic Hall" are now on demand on Amazon Prime Video.

== Personal life ==
On December 19, 2014, Lynn got engaged to her lead guitarist Steven Sterlacci, with whom she co-wrote the tracks "Can’t Get Enough" and "Told Me Yesterday" from her first television special. The couple was married on November 4, 2016.

Lynn's father and manager, Peter Calamera, plays bass guitar in her band, while her mother, Victoria Calamera, is a background vocalist. In 2020, Jessica became heavily involved in the animal rescue community after adopting a disabled dog, Audrey, who now travels with the band.

== Discography ==
=== Albums ===
Title	Details
Jessica Lynn - This Much Fun - Live from the Winery at St. George	Release date: November 27, 2013; Label: Daydreamer Records; Formats: CD, music download
Jessica Lynn EP	Release date: June 21, 2016; Label: Daydreamer Records; Formats: CD, music download
Look At Me That Way EP	Release date: September 1, 2017; Label: Daydreamer Records; Formats: CD, music download
Reimagined EP	Release date: September 17, 2021; Label: Daydreamer Records; Formats: music download
Lone Rider	Release date: September 9, 2022; Label: Daydreamer Records; Formats: music download

Year	Album/EP	Peak positions
Year	Album/EP	iTunes Top Albums
2016	"Jessica Lynn EP"	20
2021	"Reimagined"	6
2022	"Lone Rider"	5

Year	Album/EP	Peak positions
Year	Album/EP	Amazon Music Top Albums
2022	"Lone Rider"	1

=== Singles ===
Year	Single	Peak positions
Year	Single	US Country
2017	"Crazy Idea"	48
2018	"Let's Don't"	38

Year	Single	Peak positions
Year	Single	iTunes Top Singles - Country
2015	"Turn The Key"	13
2016	"Just Be Gone"	6
2016	"Not Your Woman"	16
2017	"Crazy Idea"	1
2017	"After Party"	15
2018	"Let's Don't"	7
2020	"Run To"	8
2020	"Now or Never"	2
2020	"Love Me That Way"	15
2021	"Getaway Car"	2
2021	"Roadhouse"	4
2021	"Not Your Woman (Reimagined)"	16
2021	"All For Love"	6
2022	"The Morning Always Comes"	2
