= Mahopac, New York =

- Census-designated place & hamlet
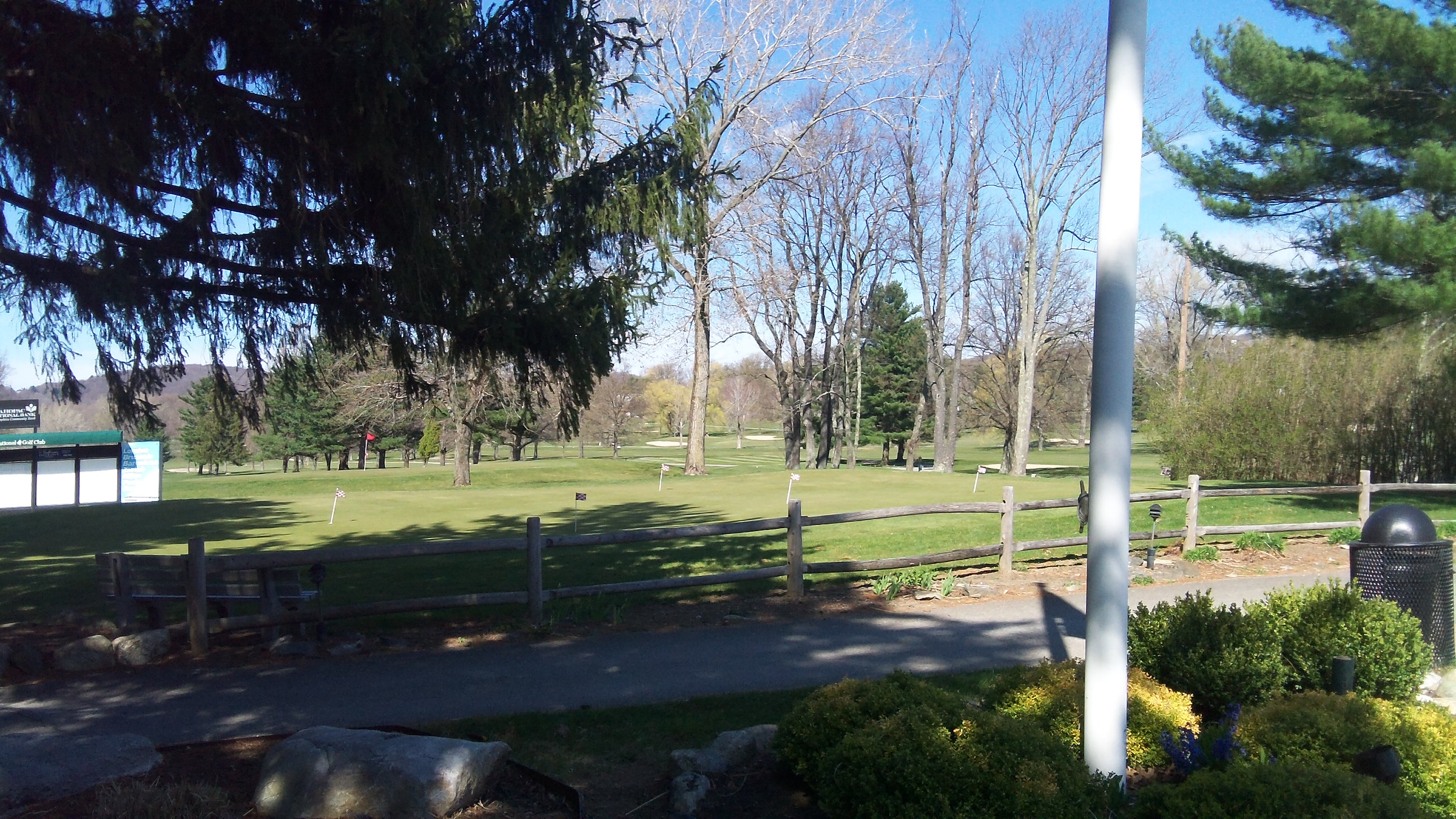
- Putnam National Golf Course in Mahopac

- Location in Putnam County and the state of New York.
- Coordinates: 41°22′11″N 73°44′15″W
- Country: United States
- State: New York
- County: Putnam
- Town: Carmel

Area
  - Total: 7.32 sq mi (18.96 km^{2})
  - Land: 6.13 sq mi (15.87 km^{2})
  - Water: 1.19 sq mi (3.09 km^{2})
- Elevation: 666 ft (203 m)

Population (2020)
  - Total: 8,932
  - Density: 1,457.4/sq mi (562.72/km^{2})
- Time zone: UTC−5 (Eastern (EST))
  - Summer (DST): UTC−4 (EDT)
- ZIP Code: 10541
- Area code: 845
- FIPS code: 36-44534
- GNIS feature ID: 0956273

Mahopac (/ˈmeɪəˌpæk/ or /ˌməˈhoʊpæk/) is a hamlet (and census-designated place) in the town of Carmel in Putnam County, New York, United States. Also known as Lake Mahopac, the exurb is a part of the New York City metropolitan area. On U.S. Route 6 at the county's southern border, connects with Westchester County. As of the 2020 census, the population was 8,933.

== History ==
Mahopac was originally inhabited by the Wappinger people, an Algonquian tribe. The hamlet's land was part of a huge tract encompassing all of today's Putnam County patented in 1697 by Adolphus Philipse, son of a wealthy Anglo-Dutch gentryman, known as the Philipse Patent. During the French and Indian War, Wappingers throughout Putnam County traveled north to Massachusetts to fight for the British.

When the British Crown refused to return their land after the war, most Wappingers abandoned the area, concentrating in Stockbridge, Massachusetts before relocating with other displaced Native Americans elsewhere. Farmers and their families migrated to Mahopac from as far away as Cape Cod and rented land from the Philipse family. Wheelwrights and blacksmiths set up shops to assist the tenant farmers.

Although no battles were fought in Mahopac during the American Revolution, the area was strategically important due to its location. With troop encampments in nearby Patterson, Yorktown, West Point, and Danbury, Connecticut, it was a cross-roads between key Colonial garrisons. Soldiers were stationed in Mahopac Falls to guard the Red Mills, an important center for grinding grain and storing flour for the American troops.

Upon Colonial victory in the Revolution, the Tory-sympathizing Philipse family lost its claim to the land, which was then resold to farmers and speculators by New York State. After the incorporation of Putnam County in 1812 the Mahopac area grew steadily. By the middle-19th century the hamlet had become a summer resort community. The New York and Harlem Railroad brought vacationers north from New York City to Croton Falls. Hotels would often have competing races of decorated horse-drawn coaches bringing passengers from the train to Lake Mahopac. After the Civil War a direct rail spur was laid, creating boom times for the village.

The locale remained primarily a summer resort until after World War II, when nearby highways such as the Taconic State and Saw Mill River parkways began to make travel by automobile convenient. With the passing of the New York Central Putnam Division's last passenger service to Mahopac in 1959, the hamlet evolved into a year-round community, many of its residents making the commute to New York City.

== Geography ==
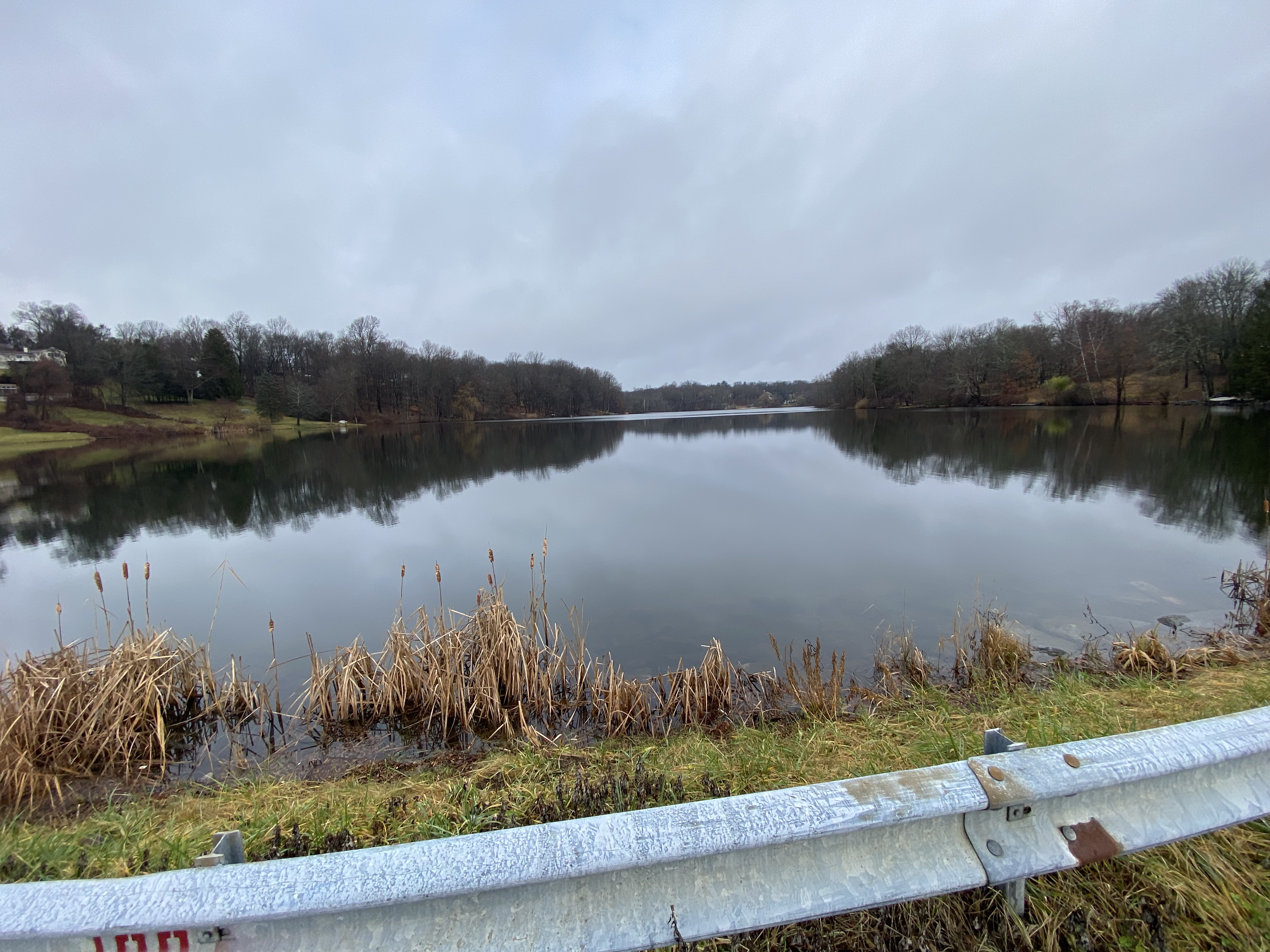
Lake Casse

According to the United States Census Bureau, the Mahopac CDP has a total area of 6.4 square miles (16.7 km^{2}), of which 5.3 square miles (13.7 km^{2}) is land and 1.1 square miles (2.9 km^{2}), or 17.57%, is water.

While the hamlet of Carmel is the seat of government for Putnam County, Mahopac is the largest population center in the town of Carmel and hosts its Town Hall.

Both Mahopac (ZIP Code 10541) and Mahopac Falls (10542) have their own post offices.

=== Lake Mahopac ===
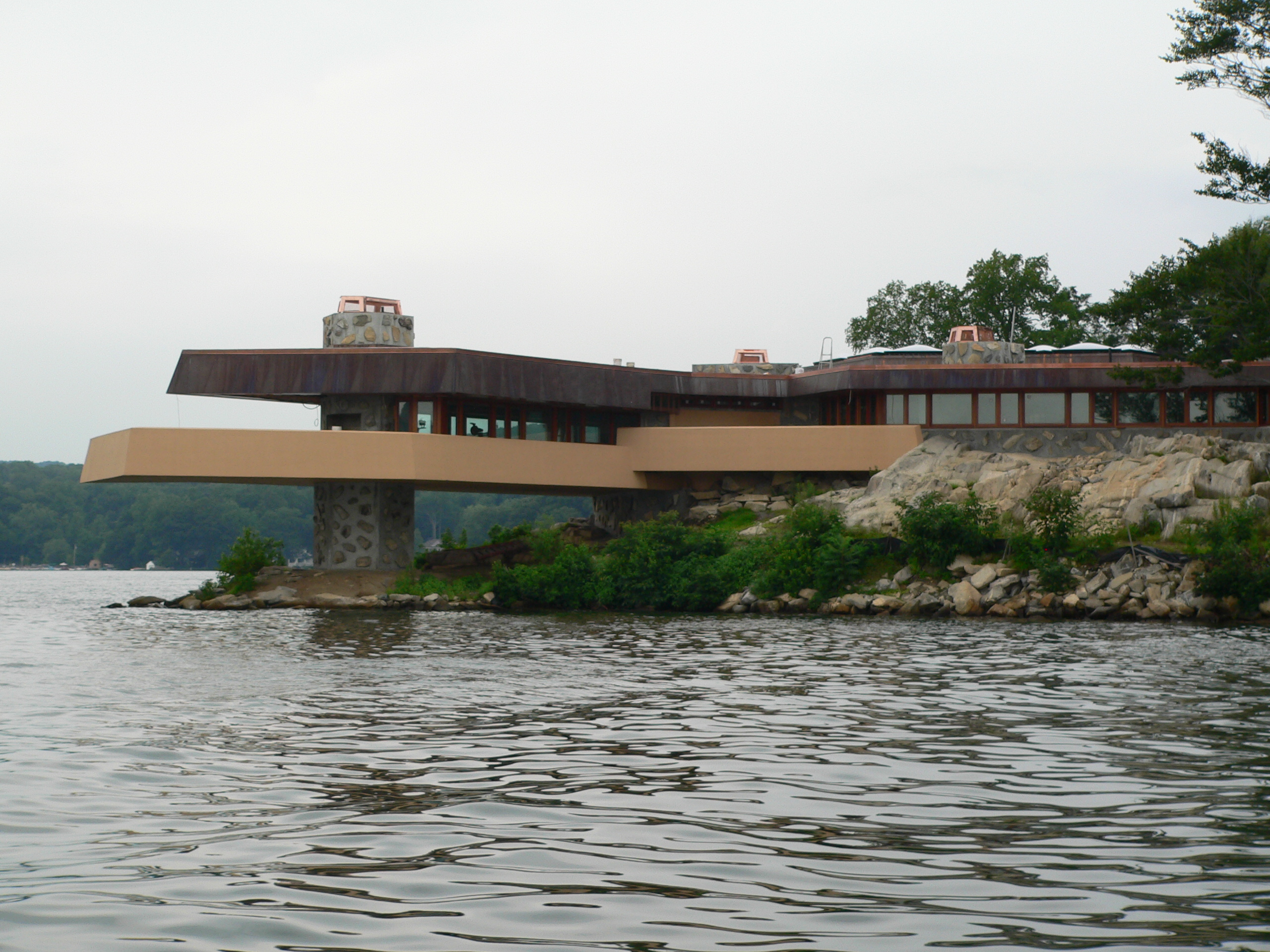
The Frank Lloyd Wright–inspired Massaro House juts into Lake Mahopac on Petre Island

The hamlet of Mahopac encircles 587-acre (238 ha) Lake Mahopac. It contains three islands, Fairy, Petre, and Canopus, all privately owned. Fairy Island sports multiple homes accessible via a short causeway; Petre Island boasts the Massaro House, a Frank Lloyd Wright-inspired residence, and a Wright-designed bungalo, the A. K. Chahroudi Cottage; Canopus is undeveloped. Boating, fishing and other water sports are permitted on the lake. Slips and support services are provided by two marinas.

The world record brown bullhead (Ameiurus nebulosus), which weighed 7 pounds 6 ounces (3.3 kg), was caught in Lake Mahopac on August 1, 2009 by angler Glenn Collacuro.

Besides Lake Mahopac, other lakes within the Mahopac CDP include Kirk Lake, Lake Casse, Lake Secor, Teakettle Spout Lake, and Long Pond. Lake Mahopac is within the Croton River watershed yet not a part of the New York City water supply system's Croton Watershed. Kirk Lake, a controlled lake in that system, is in both.

== Demographics ==
Historical population
Census	Pop.	Note	%±
1990	7,755		—
2000	8,478		9.3%
2010	8,369		−1.3%
2020	8,932		6.7%
U.S. Decennial Census

=== 2020 census ===
As of the 2020 census, Mahopac had a population of 8,932. The population density was 1,457.3 inhabitants per square mile (562.7/km^{2}).

The median age was 43.2 years. 19.4% of residents were under the age of 18 and 17.6% were 65 years of age or older. For every 100 females, there were 96.2 males, and for every 100 females age 18 and over, there were 94.0 males.

100.0% of residents lived in urban areas, while 0.0% lived in rural areas.

There were 3,353 households in Mahopac, of which 31.5% had children under the age of 18. Of all households, 54.5% were married-couple households, 16.0% had a male householder with no spouse or partner present, and 24.3% had a female householder with no spouse or partner present. About 25.0% of all households were made up of individuals, and 11.5% had someone living alone who was 65 years of age or older.

There were 3,599 housing units, of which 6.8% were vacant. The homeowner vacancy rate was 1.9%, and the rental vacancy rate was 4.5%.

Racial composition as of the 2020 census
Race	Number	Percent
White	7,115	79.7%
Black or African American	168	1.9%
American Indian and Alaska Native	39	0.4%
Asian	209	2.3%
Native Hawaiian and Other Pacific Islander	2	0.0%
Some other race	611	6.8%
Two or more races	788	8.8%
Hispanic or Latino (of any race)	1,517	17.0%

=== 2000 census ===
As of the 2000 census, there were 2,943 households, out of which 23.0% had children under the age of 18 living with them, 65.6% were married couples living together, 8.6% had a female householder with no husband present, and 22.7% were non-families. Of all households, 17.6% were made up of individuals, and 5.6% had someone living alone who was 65 years of age or older. The average household size was 2.74 and the average family size was 3.28.

In the hamlet the population was spread out, with 25.3% under the age of 18, 7.7% from 18 to 24, 30.8% from 25 to 44, 26.4% from 45 to 64, and 9.7% who were 65 years of age or older. The median age was 38 years. For every 100 females, there were 99.7 males. For every 100 females age 18 and over, there were 96.7 males.

The median income for a household in the community was $95,189, and the median income for a family was $91,148. Males had a median income of $52,315 versus $36,419 for females. The per capita income for the CDP was $44,494. The percent of persons below poverty level was 5.0%.

The median value of owner-occupied housing units was $407,900.

== Education ==
The Mahopac Central School District covers the census-designated place.

The district is divided into five schools: three K-5 schools (Lakeview Elementary School, Fulmar Road Elementary School, and Austin Road Elementary School), a middle school for grades 6-8 (Mahopac Middle School) and a high school for grades 9-12 (Mahopac High School). The district faced multi year scrutiny and pressure from New York State education mandates regarding its use of Native American themed mascots and imagery, leading to state aid threats and transition discussions.The district faced multi year scrutiny and pressure from New York State education mandates regarding its use of Native American themed mascots and imagery, leading to state aid threats and transition discussions also the change of Mahopac High schools mascot in 2024.

== Pronunciation ==
The name "Mahopac" is believed to be an indigenous word meaning "Great Lake" or "Lake of the Great Serpent". Long-time area residents affirm that the pronunciation "Ma-HO-pac" – consistent with other Native American named local communities such as Mohegan and Mohansic – was used by residents until the hamlet's large population expansion and demographic shift in the 1960s and '70s.

In spite of a 3–2 vote by the Carmel Town Board in favor of the traditional pronunciation, the modern-day first-syllable-inflected "MAY-o-pac" is used by a large number of residents today. "Mohegan, Mohansic, Mahopac. The accent is on the second syllable".

== See also ==
- New York and Putnam Railroad, which first brought service to Mahopac
- USS Mahopac, any of three namesake U.S. Navy ships: a Civil War era monitor, a post-WWI fleet tug, and a World War II–era rescue tugboat
