= Walter Panas High School =

Public high school in Cortlandt Manor, New York, United States

Location
- 300 Croton Avenue; Cortlandt Manor, New York 10567; United States
- 41.27927°N 73.85884°W

Information
- Type: Public High School
- Established: 1972
- School district: Lakeland Central School District
- Superintendent: Dr. Karen Gagliardi
- Principal: Samantha Sherwood
- Faculty: 75.34 (FTE)
- Grades: 9-12
- Enrollment: 901 (2022–23)
- Student to teacher ratio: 11.96
- Colors: Navy and gold
- Athletics: Section 1 (NYSPHSAA)
- Nickname: Panthers
- Accreditation: Board of Regents of the University of the State of New York
- Publication: "Calliope" Literary Magazine
- Website: lakelandschools.org/walterpanas

Walter Panas High School is a comprehensive, four-year public high school serving students in grades 9–12 in Cortlandt Manor, New York, USA. It was opened in 1972, becoming one of two high schools to operate in the Lakeland Central School District, along with Lakeland High School (Shrub Oak, New York).

== Performance ==
In 2015, students took 481 AP exams, with over 50% scoring a 3 (out of 5) or better. There were over 30 AP Scholars.

== Notable alumni ==
- Laurence Ekperigin, British-American basketball player in the Israeli National League
- Becca Balint, member of the U.S. House of Representatives
- Sammy Stafura, baseball player
- Mara Hobel, actress
