= Russ Swan =

Russ Swan may refer to:

- Russ Swan (baseball)
- Russ Swan (American football)
