= Yorktown High School (New York) =

Location
- 2727 Crompond Road; Yorktown Heights, New York 10598; United States
- Coordinates: 41°17′42″N 73°48′11″W

Information
- School type: Public, high school
- School district: Yorktown Central School District
- Principal: Joseph DeGennaro
- Teaching staff: 95.35 (on an FTE basis) (2023–24)
- Grades: 9–12
- Enrollment: 1,061 (2023–24)
- Student to teacher ratio: 11.13 (2023–24)
- Nickname: Huskers
- Website: sites.google.com/yorktown.org/yhs

Yorktown High School is a public high school in Yorktown Heights, New York, United States, that serves students in grades 9–12. It is accredited by the New York State Board of Regents and Middle States Association of Colleges and Secondary Schools. As of 2018, the superintendent is Ron Hattar. Since 2008, the principal has been Joseph DeGennaro.

== History ==
The school received local and national media attention after its principal, John F. Sullivan, was abruptly fired in February 2008. The reasons Superintendent Ralph Napolitano gave for Sullivan's dismissal seemed inadequate to many; students walked out in protest, and many parents expressed concern. Despite the opposition, the firing was upheld.

== Notable alumni ==
- Bill Brown, NFL player
- Roy Colsey, professional lacrosse player
- Jashvi Desai, Regeneron Science Talent Search (STS) finalist
- Susan Faludi, feminist, journalist, and author
- Charlie Gasparino, financial journalist
- Andrew Kavovit, actor (As the World Turns)
- Jeff Modesitt, NFL player
- Alexandria Ocasio-Cortez, U.S. representative
- Mandy Rose, WWE wrestler
- Dan Scavino, political advisor
- Russ Swan, NFL player
