= Andrew Herrmann =

American civil engineer

Andrew W. Herrmann
- Born: Manhattan, New York, U.S.
- Education: Valparaiso University (BS); Polytechnic Institute of New York (MS)
- Spouse: Linda Tarelli (m. 1976)
- Children: 2
- Engineering career
- Discipline: Bridge design
- Employer: Hardesty & Hanover

Andrew W. Herrmann is an American civil engineer and a principal emeritus at Hardesty & Hanover. Considered an expert in the subject of moveable bridges, he has over 40 years of experience working on projects involving the design, construction, inspection and rehabilitation of bridge structures. Herrmann served as president of the American Society of Civil Engineers in 2012 and has been an advocate for making investments to improve the nation's aging infrastructure; he has testified before the U.S. Congress and has been interviewed by the media on infrastructure-related issues.

== Early life and education ==
Andrew William Herrmann was born in Manhattan, New York City to Henry J. Herrmann and Joyce H. Herrmann (née Davis). His father was employed by Brunswick Corporation and managed bowling alleys along the East Coast. When Andrew was a teenager, his family moved from New York City to Westchester County, where he graduated from Lakeland High School in 1969. Herrmann obtained a bachelor's degree in civil engineering from Valparaiso University (Indiana) in 1973 and received a master's degree in civil engineering from the Polytechnic Institute of New York in 1980.

== Career ==
After obtaining his undergraduate degree, Herrmann began working at the firm of Hardesty & Hanover (H&H); he became a partner of the New York City-based engineering firm in 1989. Herrmann's career at H&H spanned over 40 years and his experience has included the design, construction, inspection and rehabilitation of bridge structures. He has been involved with many of H&H's major fixed and moveable bridge projects as project manager or partner-in-charge, including the replacement of the Willis Avenue Bridge in New York City. Herrmann is an expert on moveable bridges, including bascule, swing and vertical-lift spans. After he stepped down from the partnership, Herrmann transitioned to a role as a principal emeritus of H&H. He is registered as a professional engineer in 29 states plus the Canadian province of Ontario.

An advocate for making investments to improve the nation's aging infrastructure, Herrmann has provided testimony to the U.S. Congress in Washington, D.C. before the Congressional Joint Economic Committee, House Committee on Transportation and Infrastructure, House Democratic Steering and Policy Committee, and Senate Committee on Environment and Public Works. He has also been interviewed by the media on infrastructure issues and has appeared on The Crumbling of America, a 2009 television documentary on the History channel, an episode of Dan Rather Reports for a news story called "If It Ain't Broke" (originally aired November 11, 2013), and an episode of 60 Minutes—during which he flew in a helicopter with correspondent Steve Kroft to provide an aerial tour of structural problems affecting bridges in Pittsburgh as part of a news story called "Falling Apart" (originally aired November 23, 2014).

== Professional societies and awards ==
During the 1970s, Herrmann was encouraged to get involved with the American Society of Civil Engineers (ASCE) by Bernard Haber, a former partner at H&H who had hired him out of college. Herrmann became involved with his local section of ASCE, serving as the chairperson of the Metropolitan Section Structures Group (1983–1984) and president of the Metropolitan Section (1991–1992). He became a fellow of ASCE in 1991. Herrmann was a member of the advisory council for ASCE's Report Card for America's Infrastructure in 2003, 2005, 2009, 2013, and 2021, serving as the chair of the council that prepared the report card issued in 2009. On a national level, he also served ASCE as a regional director (2006–2008), treasurer (2009–2010), and president (2012).

Herrmann helped to form Heavy Movable Structures Inc. and served as the non-profit organization's first chairman. He is also a member of the American Council of Engineering Companies, American Institute of Steel Construction, American Railway Engineering and Maintenance-of-Way Association, American Road and Transportation Builders Association, American Welding Society, International Bridge, Tunnel and Turnpike Association, National Society of Professional Engineers and Structural Engineers Association of New York.

Herrmann was a recipient of the President's Medal from ASCE in 2009. He was named as the Pittsburgh Civil Engineer of the Year and the Metropolitan Section Civil Engineer by the local ASCE sections in Pittsburgh and New York City in 2012 and 2019, respectively. In 2014, Herrmann was the inaugural recipient of the Legacy Award presented by Engineering News-Record New York.

== Personal life ==
Herrmann married Linda Tarelli on April 24, 1976 in Croton, New York. The couple has two daughters. He has volunteered for Engineers Without Borders and the St. Mary's Rehabilitation Center for Children, having served as director of the latter organization from 1998 to 2002. Outside of work, Herrmann's interests include cross-country skiing, fishing, and woodworking.
