= Massaro House =

Building in Lake Mahopac, New York

Coordinates: 41°22′58.95″N 73°44′18.51″W

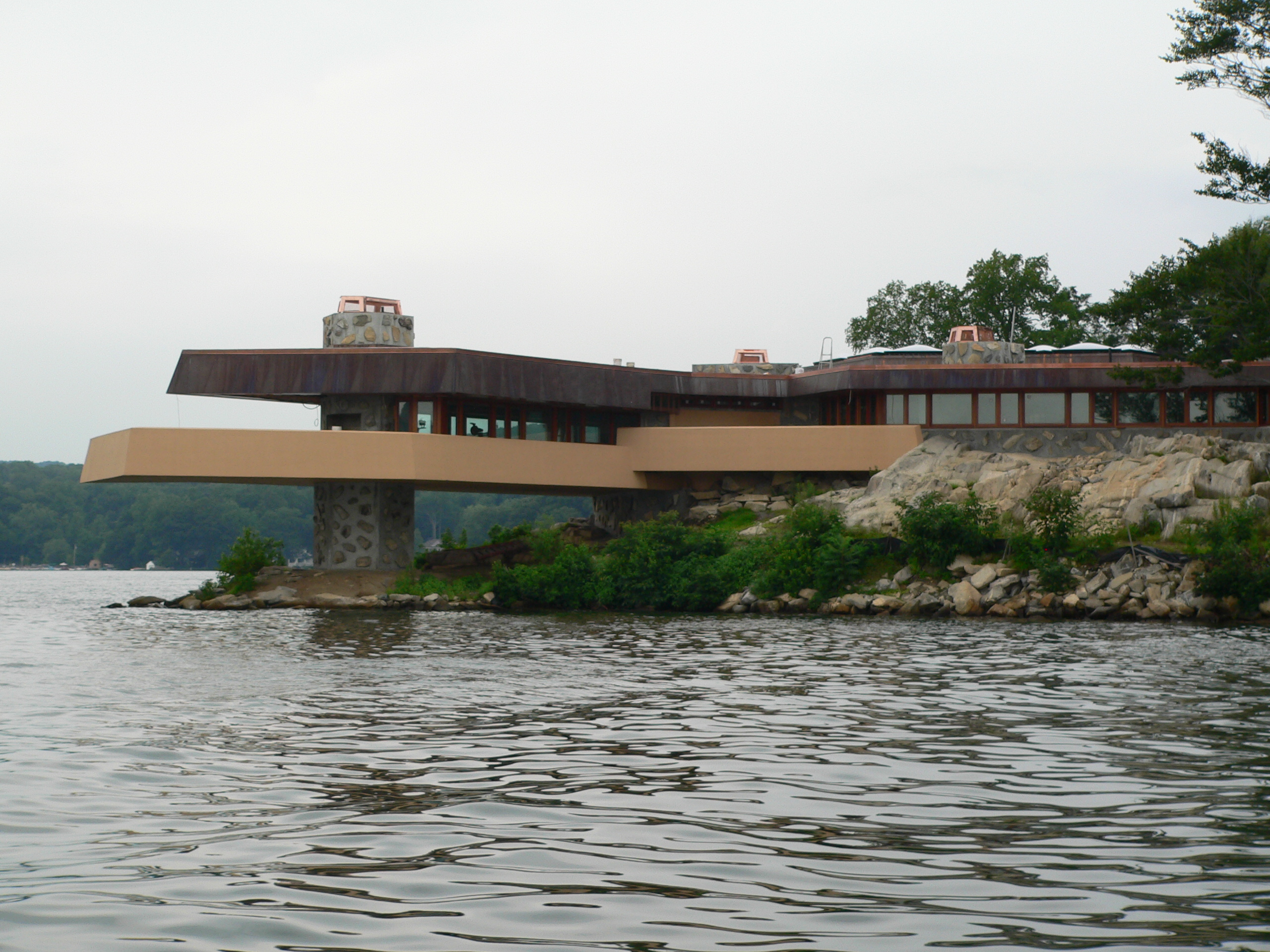
Massaro House, located on Petre Island in Lake Mahopac, New York

Massaro House is a residence on privately owned Petre Island in Lake Mahopac, New York, roughly 50 miles (80 km) north of New York City. Inspired by architect Frank Lloyd Wright, the home's design and construction have had a complex and controversial history. Wright's plan was initially known as the "Chahroudi House", for the client who commissioned it back in 1949, and for whom Wright designed and built a much smaller cottage on the island when his proposal for the main home proved prohibitively expensive for the local engineer.

In 1996 sheet metal contractor Joe Massaro acquired Petre Island and the long dormant drawings for the main home. In developing a plan to construct the home with numerous modifications, including some reflecting improved systems and technologies, a conflict arose over the project's authenticity with the Frank Lloyd Wright Foundation, which successfully legally disputed Massaro's right to refer to the structure as a Wright design.

Due to the subsequent out-of-court settlement between Massaro and the foundation the home can only be described as being "inspired by Wright" rather than a faithfully rendered, certified Wright design.

== Concept ==
In 1949, architect Frank Lloyd Wright received a commission from engineer Ahmed Chahroudi to build a house on a 10-acre (40,000 m^{2}) island he owned in Lake Mahopac, Petre (alternatively spelled "Petra", from the Latin for "rock", reflecting the prominence where the home was to be constructed). Chahroudi would later state that during a lunch meeting with Wright and Edgar Kaufmann, the owner of Wright's celebrated Fallingwater, the architect told Kaufmann: "When I finish the house on the island, it will surpass your Fallingwater".

Wright worked on designing a one-story, 5,000-square-foot (460 m^{2}) house for three months, but the project was cancelled when Chahroudi realized he would not be able to afford either the $50,000 budget that Wright envisioned for the home or a second more modest version he requested. Instead, he had Wright build a three bedroom 1,200-square-foot (110 m^{2}) guest cottage the architect had designed for the island (known today as the A. K. Chahroudi Cottage), later occupying it with his family as a summer retreat.

== Design ==
In 1996, Petre Island was purchased for US$700,000 by Joseph Massaro, a sheet metal contractor. Though he had seen the original Chahroudi commission drawings for the main home years earlier, he initially intended merely to restore the island's Wright-designed guest cottage.

Massaro received Wright's main house renderings as part of the purchase of the island. In spite of the three months that Wright had put into design work on the structure, all that survived were five drawings: a floor plan with ideas for built-in and stand-alone furniture, a building section, and three elevations. Massaro hired Thomas A. Heinz, an architect and Wright historian, to complete the unfinished design.

Heinz employed ArchiCAD building information modeling (BIM) software to model aspects of Wright's design not self-evident in the original renderings. His design also provided updated heating and cooling solutions such as air conditioning and radiant heating that were not part of the original Wright concept. The design has chimney caps—a feature to which Wright characteristically took exception—at each of the home's six fireplaces.

In common with Fallingwater, the house's design does not merely accommodate but actually incorporates the local topography. A 12-foot-high (3.7 m), 60-foot-long (18 m) rock forms the exterior to the entry and an interior wall, while a smaller rock doubles as a kitchen and bathroom wall. Again, like Fallingwater's signature terraces, the house features a cantilevered deck that stretches 25 feet (7.6 m) over Lake Mahopac. Its 18-foot-high (5.5 m) living area is illuminated with 26 triangular skylights.

Massaro sold his sheet metal business in 2000 to focus on building the house, a fluid process that included solutions and adjustments made on the fly between 2003 and 2007. These included changes to the skylight design and a staircase descending from the home like Fallingwater's, the addition of foam insulation, and an increase in the concrete's structural stability and to comply with modern building codes, among others.

== Controversy ==
=== Denial of authenticity ===
Throughout the construction, Massaro was in conflict with the Frank Lloyd Wright Foundation, which had been established by the architect in 1940 to conserve his intellectual property. The foundation claimed copyright over Wright's design, which Massaro claimed requested $450,000 to render working drawings from Wright's sketches and supervise construction of the house. Instead, Massaro hired Heinz and the foundation filed a lawsuit, which ended in a settlement that limited Massaro to referring to the structure as merely being "inspired by Frank Lloyd Wright".

The foundation refuses to officially recognize Massaro House as an authentic Frank Lloyd Wright creation on a number of aesthetic and construction grounds beyond Massaro's refusal to comply with certification. Massaro countered that he believed that Wright would rather the house be built than not built at all.

=== Criticism of design ===
Rejection of the house by critics as a Wright design extends beyond the architectural supervision and fees, and includes details of the Massaro House construction.

Notably, William Allin Storrer, an adjunct professor of architecture and Wright historian, points to the desert masonry and skylight selection. Additionally, the quality of the roof fascia and a set of missing stairs descending from the cantilevered deck to the shore below that was included in the original design are highlighted as contentious details that should remove the house from consideration as a Wright design. Storrer argued that rocks set flush in Wright's signature desert masonry designs (as well as the native rocks used on Petra Island on the Chahroudi cottage that Wright designed and oversaw the construction of in lieu of building the proposed main home) project too far out from the concrete surface on the Massaro House, appearing to be distinct from one-another, randomly applied, and protruding at odd angles from otherwise finished walls. Evading the aesthetic consequence of design choices made, Massaro countered that 4 inches (100 mm) of Styrofoam insulation had to be added in order to adhere to modern building codes, resulting in the stones projecting beyond the original dimensions. He claimed that it was a concession even Wright would have been forced to make.

Another signature of Wright's designs is the use of many windows, with the Heinz design for Massaro House including 26 skylights. The skylights chosen and installed in the home are domed, rather than the typically flat Wright designed panels. Massaro pointed out that flat panels are shown to leak, which Storrer conceded is a known issue with Wright designs but countered that solutions exist that would have allowed Massaro to stay true to "Wrightian" design principles.

Homes designed by Wright often incorporate a unique design in the fascia or window frames. To stamp the custom design into the copper to be used for the fascia on the roof, Massaro created a special machine. Wright defenders insist that the design is stamped too lightly and shallowly to satisfy Wright's design standards.

Several of Wright's design drawings for Chahroudi include a set of stairs that descend from the cantilevered deck to the rocky shore below, a motif borrowed from Fallingwater, where they descend to the stream that home is built upon, Bear Run. Massaro explained that had the stairs been included in his design they would have descended into 3 feet (0.91 m) of water, disregarding that the flight could have been shortened to accommodate a raised lakebed or stone base in that immediate area.

== Status ==
In November 2012 the property was listed for sale at US$20 million. This was reduced to below $10 million in increments through January 2019.

An urban rumor was started in 2013 that actors Brad Pitt and Angelina Jolie had acquired the home. The Massaro Family confirms the pair never owned the island or the residences on it.

The properties are still listed for sale, referred to generically as "Petra Island" without an asking price, in August 2023.

== See also ==
- List of Frank Lloyd Wright works
