= Croton-Harmon Union Free School District =

School district in the U.S. state of New York

Croton-Harmon Union Free School District (CHUFSD) or Croton-Harmon Schools is a school district headquartered in Croton-on-Hudson, New York. It operates Carrie E. Tompkins Elementary School, Pierre Van Cortlandt Middle School, and Croton-Harmon High School.

The district contains 95% of Croton-on-Hudson, New York, a large part of Cortlandt Manor, New York and a small sliver of Yorktown, New York.

Edward Fuhrman was previously superintendent until 2018, when he was replaced by Deborah O'Connell.
