= Jeff Modesitt =

American football player (1964–1990)

No. 82
- Position: Tight end

Personal information
- Born: January 1, 1964; Terre Haute, Indiana, U.S.
- Died: August 3, 1990 (aged 26); Atlanta, Georgia, U.S.
- Listed height: 6 ft 5 in (1.96 m)
- Listed weight: 245 lb (111 kg)

Career information
- High school: Yorktown (Yorktown Heights, New York)
- College: Delaware
- NFL draft: 1987: undrafted

Career history
- Tampa Bay Buccaneers (1987); Indianapolis Colts (1988)*; Cleveland Browns (1988); Atlanta Falcons (1989)*
- * Offseason or practice squad member only

Awards and highlights
- Second-team All-Eastern College Athletic Conference honors (1986); Second-team All-Yankee Conference honors (1986)

Career NFL statistics
- Games played: 1
- Stats at Pro Football Reference

Jeffrey A. Modesitt (January 1, 1964 – August 3, 1990) was an American professional football tight end who played for one season in the National Football League (NFL). After playing college football for the Delaware Fightin' Blue Hens, he was signed by the Tampa Bay Buccaneers as an undrafted free agent in 1987. He played in one game for the Buccaneers in 1987.

== College career ==
Modesitt played college football for the University of Delaware Fightin' Blue Hens from 1984 to 1986. In 1985, he started six games and recorded 11 receptions for 128 yards and a touchdown. He started 12 games in 1986 and had 28 receptions for 456 yards and three touchdowns. In his senior year, he was named an Associated Press honorable mention All-America, second-team All-Eastern College Athletic Conference, and second-team All-Yankee Conference player. He also earned the Vincent "Winnie" Mayer Outstanding Senior End Award in 1986.

== Professional career ==
Modesitt was signed by the Tampa Bay Buccaneers as an undrafted free agent on May 15, 1987. He was released before the start of the season on August 5, 1987, but was re-signed and played in one game for the team in 1987.

He was signed by the Indianapolis Colts after the 1987 season, but was waived on July 27, 1988. Modesitt was signed by the Cleveland Browns on August 1, 1988. He spent the season on the team's injured reserve list due to a shoulder injury.

Modesitt was signed by the Atlanta Falcons on March 23, 1989, but was waived on May 26, 1989.

== Car accident ==
On December 19, 1989, Modesitt got into a car accident in Lawrenceville, Georgia, which killed Atlanta Falcons player Brad Beckman, who was the passenger in the car. Modesitt was the driver, and his car bumped into another car. Modesitt got out of the vehicle to survey the damage, and a tractor trailer rig hit his car, with Beckman still inside, and him. Beckman was killed instantly, while Modesitt suffered a fractured pelvis, fractured elbow, fractured leg, concussion, and had to have a toe amputated.

== Death ==
Modesitt was shot and killed on August 3, 1990, in Atlanta, Georgia, outside a Waffle House restaurant. He was 26 years old.
