= The Blue Book Network =

American marketing software company

- Company type: ESOP
- Founded: 1913
- Headquarters: Jefferson Valley, New York
- Area served: United States
- Founder: The O'Malley Family
- Key people: Richard Johnson, President
- Industry: Construction
- Services: Online marketplace, Review site, SaaS, Magazine Advertising, SEO/SEM, Trade shows
- Revenue: ▲$100M US
- Website: http://www.thebluebook.com

The Blue Book Network, also known as The Contractor's Blue Book or simply as The Blue Book, is a marketing, workflow software and print media company.

The company name is rooted in the fact that for over 104 years they have published numerous regional buyers guides listing commercial construction companies, largely subcontractors and suppliers. Now twice annually (Spring & Fall), 32 regional blue book editions are delivered to property managers, facilities managers and commercial general contractors. It is often compared to a yellow pages for contractors, given the focus on mini ads within The Who's Who of Building & Construction and the more recent evolution of search engine marketing.

== History ==
1937 edition of the Subcontractors Register

The company traces its roots to when Joseph O'Malley, president of The Society of the Allied Building Trades, first published a subcontractor's registry for New York City in 1913. The Subcontractors Register for the Allied Building Trades was a directory of subcontractors for the New York City area, listing companies by their trade. It was published by Joseph O'Malley (1893–1985) who was later joined by his nephew, Walter Francis O'Malley, as editor. The 1942 version calls itself "A Classified List for the Allied Building Trades of Sub-Contractors, Material Dealers & Manufacturers, General Contractors & Builders, Architects — Engineers, Real Estate Management Firms".

In 1999, the company extended its focus to include bid messaging and private project reporting. A private and secure online plan room providing full reporting called BB-Bid was released at no cost to general contractors and property/facility managers. The BB-Bid software (rebranded as http://OneTeam.build) allows a user to upload a construction project onto the site and message the bid to the subcontracting and supplier community, regardless of their presence in the paid print directory.

In 2013, the company became an Employee Owned Corporation with the creation of an employee stock ownership plan devised by then owner James O'Malley. James O'Malley had been the CEO for over 50 years.

In 2014, they partnered with BUILD to help commercial construction companies secure their targeted domain and appropriate domain name registration.

In 2016, The Blue Book introduced its new regional construction magazines - The Who's Who in Building & Construction (and each edition includes their regional buyer's guide). The magazines are published in both the spring and fall.

In 2019 The Blue Book Network released Engage, a free business communication app built specifically for the US commercial construction industry.

In 2021, Symphony Technology Group announced a strategic merger of The Blue Book and Dodge Data & Analytics, which the private equity firm previously acquired from McGraw Hill in 2014.
