= Richard Grasso =

Former chairman and chief executive of the New York Stock Exchange

- Richard “Dick” Grasso in 2005
- Born: July 26, 1946 (age 80); Jackson Heights, New York, U.S.
- Other name: Dick Grasso
- Occupations: Business executive; investor; trader; entrepreneur
- Years active: 1968-2003
- Known for: Former chairman and CEO of the NYSE (1995–2003)
- Title: CEO – New York Stock Exchange (1995-2003); Founder – Gladiator Holdings Inc.
- Political party: Republican
- Board member of: National Italian American Foundation; The Centurian Foundation; Lower Manhattan Development Corp.; New York City Police Foundation; New York City Public Private Initiatives Inc.; Yale School of Management (advisory)

Richard A. "Dick" Grasso (born July 26, 1946) is a business executive who was the chairman and chief executive of the New York Stock Exchange from 1995 to 2003. He started in 1968, when he was hired by the Exchange as a floor clerk.

He later became embroiled in controversies and lawsuits about his allegedly excessive pay package and $188.5 million golden parachute. The New York Attorney General filed a lawsuit which challenged the compensation as excessive for the NYSE, which at the time was a nonprofit. However, on July 1, 2008, the New York State Court of Appeals dismissed all claims against Grasso because the NYSE had changed its status from a nonprofit to a for-profit organization, which meant that the attorney general had lost standing to sue Grasso.

== Early life and education ==
Grasso was raised by his mother and two aunts in Jackson Heights in New York City. His father left the family when Richard was an infant. He graduated from Newtown High School in Queens and attended Pace University for two years before enlisting in the Army.

== Career ==
=== New York Stock Exchange ===
Two weeks after leaving the Army in 1968, Grasso became a clerk at the New York Stock Exchange. Grasso moved up in the ranks, becoming president of the exchange and then CEO in the early 1990s. As CEO, he was credited with cementing the NYSE's position as the preeminent U.S. stock market. Grasso also was an advisory board member for Yale School of Management.

==== FARC visit ====
On June 26, 1999, Reuters reported that Grasso met with Colombian rebels, the FARC. FARC is considered a terrorist organization by the U.S. State Department (on its list of Foreign Terrorist Organizations since 1997) and is allegedly responsible for kidnappings and narcotics trafficking in order to bankroll their revolutionary activities (see: narcoterrorism).

The article quoted Grasso as saying, "I invite members of the FARC to visit the New York Stock Exchange so that they can get to know the market personally". Some found the meeting inexplicable, considering the FARC supports anti-capitalist ideals and has no officially recognized financial clout. Grasso told reporters that he was bringing "a message of cooperation from U.S. financial services".

==== NYSE compensation controversy ====
On August 27, 2003, it was revealed that Grasso had been given a deferred compensation pay package worth almost $140 million. This caused immediate controversy, as the hand-picked compensation committee consisted mainly of representatives from NYSE-listed companies over which Grasso had regulatory authority as its CEO.

Following criticism of the deal from U.S. Securities and Exchange Commission chairman William H. Donaldson, who preceded Grasso as Chairman of the NYSE, and several pension fund heads (who control some of the largest pools of equity investment capital in the United States), the NYSE board asked Grasso to leave in a 13–7 vote. He stepped down on September 17, 2003, and several senior officials followed in the same month. Law firm Winston & Strawn carried out an investigation, on behalf of the NYSE, and a comprehensive report analyzing Grasso's alleged excessive compensation and benefits, and the governance failures behind it, was completed in December.

==== Lawsuit ====
On May 24, 2004, Grasso was sued by New York State Attorney General Eliot Spitzer demanding repayment of the majority of the $140 million pay package. Prior to being dismissed Grasso had been in line to receive an additional $48 million over the $139.5 million he had already received; he was not paid the additional funds.

On May 26, 2004, Grasso responded with a counter-suit against the Exchange and its chairman John Reed. The counterclaim was twofold; It sought restitution of unpaid portions of his retirement package and further accused certain individuals at the Exchange of "besmirching his name". Grasso went on to place a 1,500-word op-ed article in the Wall Street Journal detailing this counter-suit as well as his grievances against Spitzer. The lawsuit against Grasso continued to move toward trial in 2006 with neither side showing any interest in settling.

On October 19, 2006, it was reported that the New York State Supreme Court issued a summary decision ordering Grasso to repay a significant amount of excess compensation in an article entitled "Ex-NYSE chief ordered to return part of $188M". Although Grasso will appeal, the same article reports that Spitzer's office has disclosed the amount of restitution to be in the tens of millions of dollars. In his ruling, Judge Ramos wrote that Grasso's failure to disclose the true extent of his total compensation prevented the compensation committee from exercising its fiduciary duties. The above CNN article also reported that Grasso's counterclaim of defamation was dismissed.

On July 1, 2008, the New York State Court of Appeals dismissed all claims against Grasso. The majority opinion stated that since the NYSE was now a subsidiary of a for-profit multinational corporation, the State of New York had no oversight over the affairs of the company in this matter and that prosecution was "not in the public interest". Current attorney general Andrew Cuomo stated that he had no intention to appeal this decision any further and that the case was effectively over. The court ruled that Grasso was entitled to the entirety of his compensation. The court also dismissed Grasso's actions against the NYSE and other parties as related to this matter.

During an SEC investigation Grasso invoked his Fifth Amendment right against self-incrimination in refusing to answer questions regarding his conduct during an NYSE investigation into possibly improper activities by Exchange specialist firms. The specialist firms paid $242 million in settlements with the SEC, and the NYSE itself was censured for failing to properly supervise the specialist firms.

The suit against Grasso came under criticism, with journalist Charles Gasparino lambasting it in the epilogue to his book, Blood on the Street. He is the subject of a book by Gasparino, King of the Club.
