= Bill Brown (linebacker) =

American football player (1936–1989)

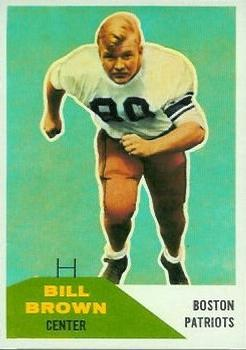
- 1960 Fleer trading card

No. 54
- Position: Linebacker

Personal information
- Born: April 25, 1936; Mount Kisco, New York, U.S.
- Died: April 18, 1989 (aged 52); Hempstead, New York, U.S.
- Listed height: 6 ft 1 in (1.85 m)
- Listed weight: 230 lb (104 kg)

Career information
- High school: Yorktown (Yorktown Heights, New York)
- College: Bridgeport (1953–1954); Syracuse (1955–1956)
- NFL draft: 1957: 9th round, 108th overall pick

Career history
- Ottawa Rough Riders (1957)*; Boston Patriots (1960)
- * Offseason or practice squad member only

Career AFL statistics
- Interceptions: 1
- Stats at Pro Football Reference

William Evans Brown (April 25, 1936 – April 18, 1989) was an American professional football linebacker who played for the Boston Patriots of the American Football League (AFL). He played college football at the University of Bridgeport and Syracuse University.

== Early life and college ==
William Evans Brown was born on April 25, 1936, in Mount Kisco, New York. He played six-man football at Yorktown High School in Yorktown Heights, New York. He was a proficient drop kicker in high school.

Brown was a member of the college football team at the University of Bridgeport from 1953 to 1954. He then transferred to Syracuse University, where he was a two-year letterman for the Syracuse Orange from 1955 to 1956. He earned All-East honors his senior year in 1956. Brown was also a game captain for the 1957 Cotton Bowl Classic. He graduated from Syracuse in 1958.

== Professional career ==
Brown was selected by the Chicago Bears in the ninth round, with the 108th overall pick, of the 1957 NFL draft. He instead signed with the Ottawa Rough Riders of the Interprovincial Rugby Football Union but was later released. After his stint with the Rough Riders, he became a teacher and football coach at Manlius Military Academy.

Brown signed with the Boston Patriots of the American Football League (AFL) on February 18, 1960. He played in all 14 games, starting nine, for the Patriots during the team's inaugural 1960 season and recorded one interception. He played defense and special teams while with the Patriots. Boston finished the year with a 5–9 record.

== Coaching career ==
Brown later served as a football coach at Berner High School in Massapequa, New York and the C.W. Post Campus of Long Island University. Berner High went undefeated four times while Brown was there. He died of cancer on April 18, 1989, in Hempstead, New York. He had been the offensive line coach at Hofstra University from 1986 until his death.
