= Blood on the Street =

Book by Charles Gasparino

Blood on the Street: The Sensational Inside Story of How Wall Street Analysts Duped a Generation of Investors
- Author: Charles Gasparino
- Language: English
- Genre: Non-fiction
- Publisher: Free Press
- Publication date: 2005
- Publication place: United States

Blood on the Street: The Sensational Inside Story of How Wall Street Analysts Duped a Generation of Investors (2005) is a book by American journalist Charles Gasparino and published by Free Press.

== Description ==
Gasparino originally broke the story of the dot-com bubble and impending stock market crash while writing for The Wall Street Journal (WSJ) and he won the New York Press Club award for coverage of this and related Wall Street research scandals. His WSJ articles prompted then New York State attorney general Eliot Spitzer to launch an investigation. Blood on the Street is a more in-depth analysis of the dot-com bubble of the late 1990s-early 2000s, described how it happened and who were largely responsible.

== Critical reception ==
Barron's named the book one of the best of 2005, noting it details how corrupt research proliferated during the dot-com boom. Although the boundless optimism of that era has faded, the lessons are well worth remembering.

Hank Boerner in Corporate Finance Review writes that the book is a very thorough narrative of the "financial analyst scandals" that led to the global settlement.
