= Croton-Harmon High School =

Public high school in Croton-on-Hudson, NY, United States

Coordinates: 41°12′24.5″N 73°52′55.05″W

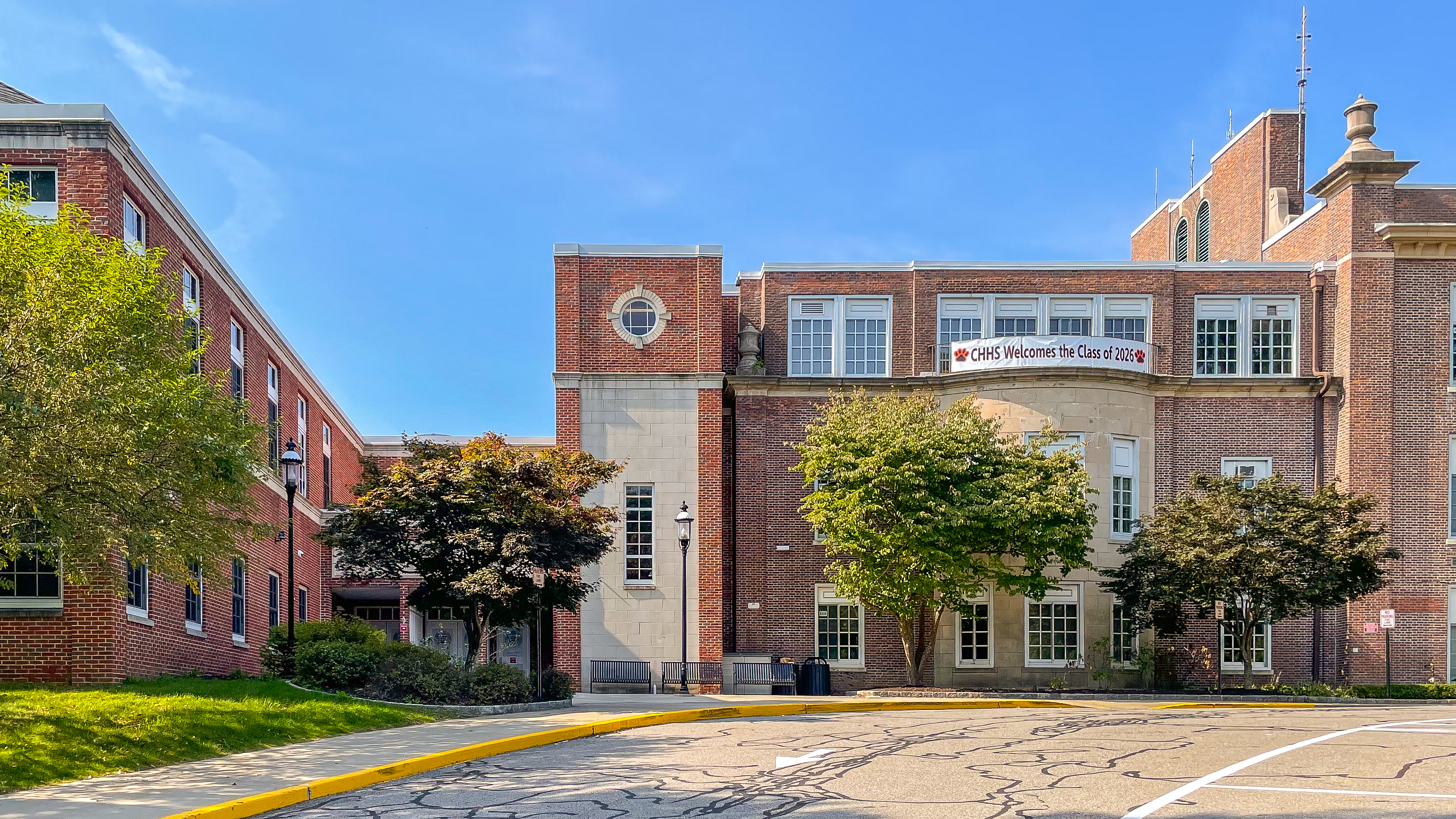

Location
- 7 Bethea Drive; Croton-on-Hudson, NY 10520; United States

Information
- Type: Public high school
- Established: 1923
- School district: Croton-Harmon Union Free School District
- Dean: Spencer Heath
- Principal: Jack Nussbaum
- Teaching staff: 47.15 (FTE)
- Grades: 9-12
- Enrollment: 508 (2023–2024)
- Student to teacher ratio: 10.77
- Colors: Orange and black
- Mascot: The Tigers
- Rival: Hendrick Hudson High School
- Newspaper: Tiger Times
- Yearbook: Tiger Tales
- Affiliations: Section 1 (NYSPHSAA)
- Website: https://chhs.chufsd.org/

Croton-Harmon High School (CHHS) is a public high school located in Croton-on-Hudson, New York. It is administered by the Croton-Harmon Union Free School District, and serves 9th-12th grade students. As of the 2023-2024 school year, 508 students were enrolled, with a student-teacher ratio of 10.77.

Due to an increase in students since its original construction, the school was expanded in the 1950s with a gym, and again in 2005–2006 with eight new classrooms, an auxiliary gym, and a new library. Between 2006 and 2017, the library also included a space for students to use desktop computers. In 2017, the school received a grant for a Nureva Span system, which replaced the desktop computers in favor of a more collaborative learning support system.

== History ==
- The school was built in 1923.
- During the second World War, a small radar post was placed on the roof; it has long since been dismantled.
- In the 1950s, the first expansion was made onto the school.
- The school has a time capsule donated by the Class of 2006 to be opened by the Class of 2056.
- In 2005 and 2006, the school underwent an expansion of several classrooms.
- The school has a plaque donated to the first World War I soldier from Croton-on-Hudson who died.

== Classes ==
Croton-Harmon High School is noted for its high testing scores, its science research, world language, and performing arts programs, university in the High School and Advanced Placement courses, and high graduation and college attendance rates.

The school offers the usual range of high school classes, as well as the following AP classes: Biology, Macroeconomics, Calculus AB and BC, Physics, Chemistry, Spanish Language, French Language, English Language, English Literature, Statistics, Studio Art, Environmental Science, World History, US History

Language classes include Spanish, French, Mandarin Chinese, and English as a Second Language (ESL). The school also offers a number of electives including music and art classes.

Honors courses are not offered. All ninth grade and tenth grade students are enrolled in Regents level English courses. Exceptional performance in these classes will place an honors ("H") merit on the student's transcript. Juniors and seniors have the option of enrolling in AP level English courses instead of taking further Regents level courses.

The high school also boasts a multi-year science research curriculum for students interested in pursuing STEM research. The Science Research program gives students the opportunity to conduct graduate or college-level science research experiments under the guidance of a professional mentor. Students design their own research plan, carry out their research experiment, and write a professional research paper.

Students can also obtain college credits for classes while in high school through The University in the High School (UHS) Program. As a bridging experience to college, UHS courses can help students begin to develop the skills and experience necessary for academic success in higher education.

== Lawsuits ==
=== 2019 Title IX Lawsuit ===
As of 2019, Croton-Harmon High School has been the subject of an ongoing Title IX lawsuit. The suit stems from the 2016 sexual assault of a freshman at a house party by multiple Croton-Harmon High School students. The suit claims that the victim was extensively bullied for coming forward, that the student faced retaliatory grading by Croton-Harmon High School teachers, and the school did not comply with Title IX because it did not separate the victim from her attackers. The suit also claims that the school denied the victim's repeated requests to change school.
