= Lakeland High School (New York) =

Public high school in Shrub Oak, New York, United States

Location
- 1349 East Main Street; Shrub Oak, New York 10588; United States; 41.3250939°N 73.8370797°W

Information
- Type: Public high school
- Established: 1972
- School district: Lakeland Central School District
- Superintendent: Dominick Virga
- CEEB code: 335187
- Principal: Chris Cummings
- Teaching staff: 83.52 (on an FTE basis)
- Grades: 9–12
- Enrollment: 966 (2024–2025)
- Student to teacher ratio: 11.57
- Athletics: Section 1 (NYSPHSAA)
- Accreditation: Board of Regents of the University of the State of New York
- Website: lakelandschools.org/lakelandhigh

Lakeland High School (LHS), located in Shrub Oak, New York, United States, is a senior public high school serving students in ninth through twelfth grades as part of the Lakeland Central School District. Lakeland High School operates within over 40 square miles (100 km^{2}) of northern Westchester County.

As of the 2014–15 school year, the school had an enrollment of 1,045 students and 77.3 classroom teachers (on an FTE basis), for a student–teacher ratio of 13.5:1.

== Performance ==
The Class of 2016 had an unweighted average GPA of 86.31, with a range of 98.35-71.03.

In 2015, a total of 348 students took 715 AP exams, with 60% scoring a 3 (out of 5) or better. There were over 60 AP Scholars.

== Notable alumni ==
- T. C. Boyle, author, taught at Lakeland High School from 1968 to 1972
- Jonathan de Marte (born 1993), Israeli-American baseball pitcher
- Melissa González, member of the USA Women's Olympic Field Hockey Team
- Andrew Herrmann (1969), past president of the American Society of Civil Engineers
- Lawrence Lindsey (1972), economist, former member of the Board of Governors of the Federal Reserve, professor at Harvard University
- Jessica Lynn (2008), country music artist
- Bill Roth, gymnast
- Herb Trimpe (1957), illustrator responsible for designing the school's mascot
