= Jefferson Valley Mall =

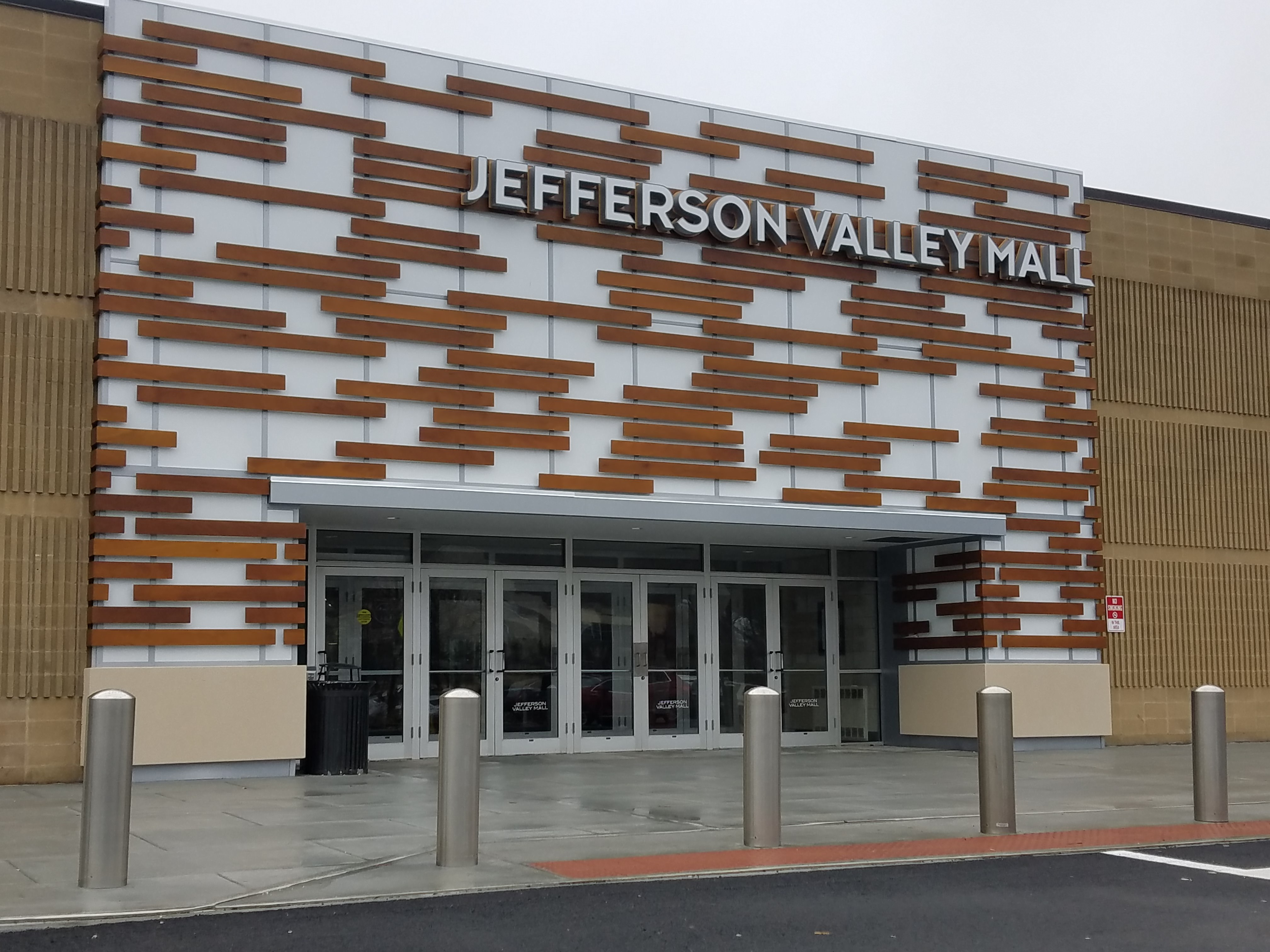
- Location: Yorktown Heights, New York
- Coordinates: 41.3286°N 73.8076°W
- Address: 650 Lee Boulevard
- Opened: 1983
- Developer: Melvin Simon & Associates
- Manager: CBRE
- Owner: Washington Prime Group
- Num. of stores: 80
- Num. of anchor tenants: 3 (2 open, 1 vacant)
- Floor area: 583,063 sq ft (54,168 m^{2})
- Floors: 2
- Website: jeffersonvalleymall.com

Jefferson Valley Mall is an enclosed shopping mall in Yorktown, New York. Opened in 1983, it is anchored by Macy's and Dick's Sporting Goods. It is managed by Washington Prime Group.

== History ==
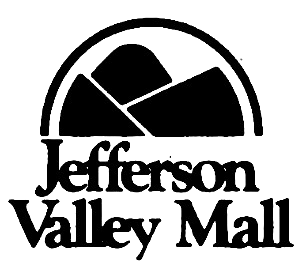
The Original Jefferson Valley Mall logo

Melvin Simon & Associates built Jefferson Valley Mall in 1983, which included Service Merchandise, Sears and Read's (later Jordan Marsh, then Abraham & Straus, now Macy's).

Expansion plans were announced in 1996. These were to comprise the addition of 80,000 square feet to Macy's and an additional anchor.

Service Merchandise, another mall tenant that closed in 1999, became H&M in 2001.

In the early 2000s, the mall underwent a renovation; the flooring and color were changed, along with the removal of the fountain and trees. In February 2016, the mall ownership was changed from Simon to Washington Prime Group.

Construction is underway to expand and renovate the mall. On October 15, 2018, it was announced that Sears would shutter. It is set to be reconstructed to feature additional mall space.
