= Mohegan Lake, New York =

- CDP
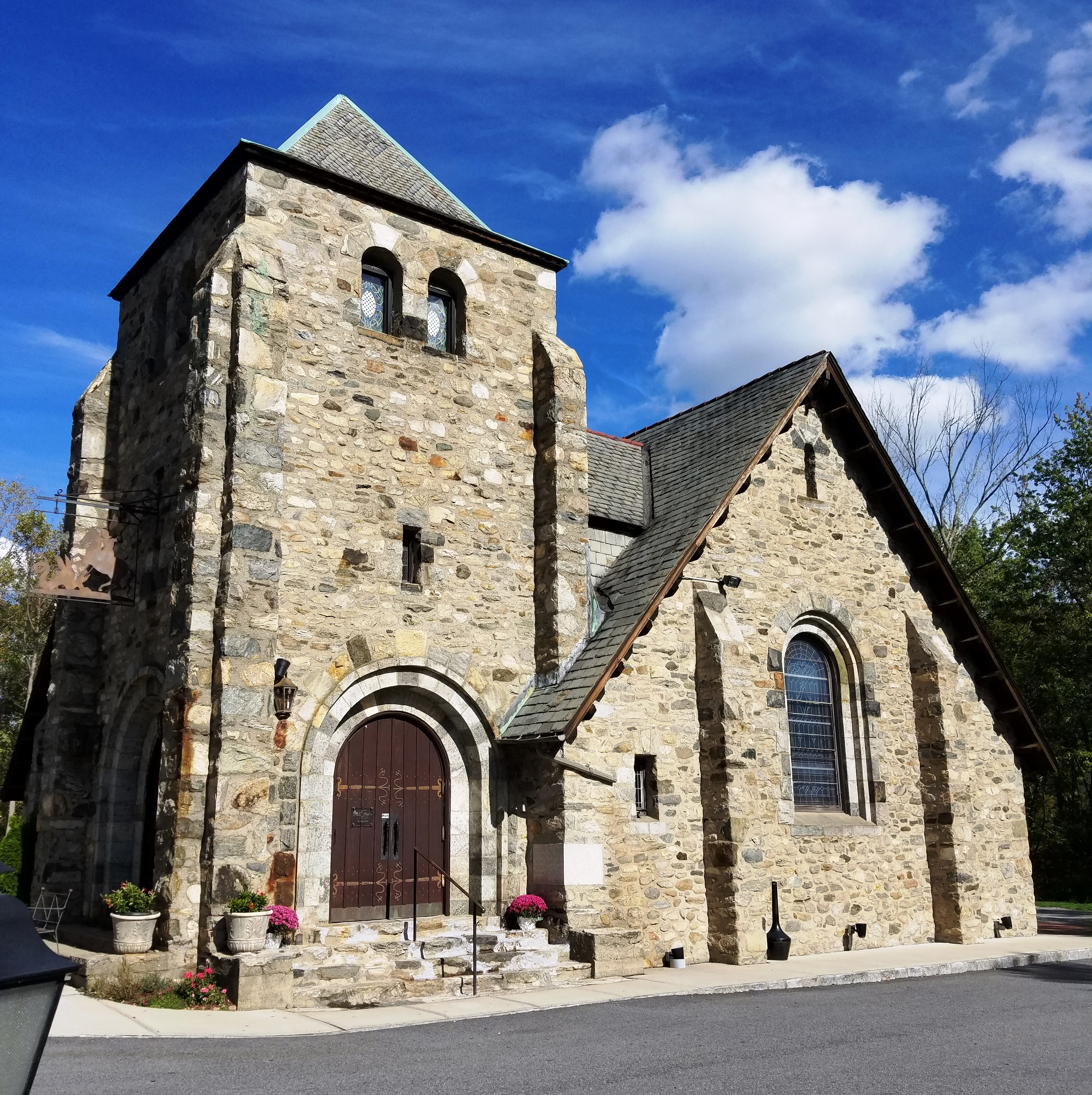
- St. George's Church in Mohegan Lake (2016)

- Location of Mohegan Lake, New York
- Coordinates: 41°19′7″N 73°50′53″W
- Country: United States
- State: New York
- County: Westchester
- Town: Yorktown

Area
  - Total: 3.08 sq mi (7.98 km^{2})
  - Land: 2.89 sq mi (7.48 km^{2})
  - Water: 0.19 sq mi (0.50 km^{2})
- Elevation: 522 ft (159 m)

Population (2020)
  - Total: 5,896
  - Density: 2,042.2/sq mi (788.51/km^{2})
- Time zone: UTC-5 (Eastern (EST))
  - Summer (DST): UTC-4 (EDT)
- ZIP code: 10547
- Area code: 914
- FIPS code: 36-40689
- GNIS feature ID: 1852903

Lake Mohegan, commonly known as Mohegan Lake, is a census-designated place (CDP) located in the Town of Yorktown in Westchester County, New York, United States.

There is a private lake, Mohegan Lake, also known as "Lake Mohegan", with beaches which are occasionally closed for swimming due to harmful algal blooms.

The town was home to several former summer bungalow colonies in the 1950s and 1960s. They included the Skyview Colony and Lakeview Colony off U.S. Route 6.

== Etymology ==
Mohegan Lake was named "Lake Mohegan" in 1859 by William Jones, who owned the Mount Pleasant Hotel on the eastern side of the lake.

The Mohegan were a tribe of Native Americans once associated with the Pequot of easternmost Connecticut, who were pushed successively west to the area of the Housatonic River during the 17th and into the 18th century. There is no indication of them ever inhabiting northern Westchester County in the vicinity of Peekskill, or any other nearby area.

The change in syntax, reversing the modern community's name to "Mohegan Lake", dates back to the early 1970s, before which residents commonly referred to it as "Lake Mohegan", the name still used by the United States Census Bureau for the CDP. The population in the 2010 Census was 6,010.

== Geography ==
Mohegan Lake is located at 41°19′7″N 73°50′53″W (41.318568, -73.848029). According to the United States Census Bureau, the CDP has a total area of 3.1 square miles (8.0 km^{2}), of which 2.9 square miles (7.5 km^{2}) is land and 0.2 square miles (0.52 km^{2}), or 5.52%, is water.

== Demographics ==
Historical population
Census	Pop.	Note	%±
2020	5,896		—
U.S. Decennial Census

As of the census of 2000, there were 5,979 people, 1,975 households, and 1,520 families residing in the CDP. The population density was 2,058.4 inhabitants per square mile (794.8/km^{2}). There were 2,052 housing units at an average density of 706.5 per square mile (272.8/km^{2}). The racial makeup of the CDP was 84.75% White, 6.89% African American, 0.33% Native American, 2.91% Asian, 0.02% Pacific Islander, 2.78% from other races, and 2.32% from two or more races. Hispanic or, Latino of any race were 9.70% of the population.

There were 1,975 households, out of which 43.1% had children under the age of 18 living with them, 65.2% were married couples living together, 9.0% had a female householder with no husband present, and 23.0% were non-families. 18.9% of all households were made up of individuals, and 4.7% had someone residing alone who was 65 years of age or older. The average household size was 2.83 and the average family size was 3.26.

In the CDP, the population was spread out, with 28.8% under the age of 18, 7.6% from 18 to 24, 32.7% from 25 to 44, 22.1% from 45 to 64, and 8.8% who were 65 years of age or older. The median age was 35 years. For every 100 females, there were 99.8 males. For every 100 females age 18 and over, there were 95.2 males.

The median income for a household in the CDP was $80,719, and the median income for a family was $88,903. Males had a median income of $59,219 versus $39,648 for females. The per capita income for the CDP was $29,945. About 3.5% of families and 4.1% of the population were below the poverty line, including 7.2% of those under age 18 and none of those age 65 or over.

== Historic places ==
St. George's Church, built in 1911-12 and designed by Hewett & Bottomley in the Romanesque Revival style, was added to the National Register of Historic Places on May 8, 2012.

St. Mary Church has a marker commemorating cadets of the Mohegan Lake School, a military academy for boys from 1880 to 1934. The church is the last reminder of the school's existence.

== Education ==
Almost all of the Lake Mohegan census-designated place is in the Lakeland Central School District, while a small portion in the south is in the Yorktown Central School District.
