= Lakeland Central School District =

School district in Shrub Oak, New York, United States

Address
- 1086 Main Street Shrub Oak, New York, 10588; United States
- Coordinates: 41.3300°N 73.8280°W

District information
- Type: Public school district
- Grades: K–12
- Established: 1951; 75 years ago
- Superintendent: Dr. Karen Gagliardi
- Business administrator: Pamela DellaDonna
- School board: 9 members
- Chair of the board: Adam Kaufman
- Schools: 5 elementary schools, 1 middle school, 2 high schools
- NCES District ID: 3616620

Students and staff
- Students: 5579
- Teachers: 466
- Staff: 1041

Other information
- Website: lakelandschools.org

The Lakeland Central School District is a public school district in New York State, serving approximately 5200 students in 44 square miles (110 km^{2}) of the towns of Yorktown, Cortlandt and Somers in Westchester County; and the towns of Carmel, Philipstown, and Putnam Valley in Putnam County. It is the largest suburban school district (by area) in Westchester County and a member of the Putnam/Northern Westchester BOCES.

The district's main office is located in Shrub Oak, New York. Dr. Karen Gagliardi is the current Superintendent of Schools.

== Board of education ==
The Board of Education (BOE) consists of 9 members who reside in the Lakeland Central School District. Members serve staggered 3-year terms. Elections are held each May for board members and to vote on the School District Budget.

== History ==
In 1951, the Shrub Oak, Toddville, and Van Cortlandtville school districts combined to become the Lakeland School District. Lakeland School District officially began operating in 1952. At its peak in 1973, the district served 8,594 students before dropping to its current levels of around 5,600 students.

== Schools ==
The Lakeland Central Central School District operates five elementary schools, one Middle school, and two high schools across the district.

=== Elementary Schools (K-5) ===
- Benjamin Franklin Elementary School (Yorktown Heights)
- George Washington Elementary School (Mohegan Lake)
- Lincoln-Titus Elementary School (Crompond)
- Thomas Jefferson Elementary School (Yorktown Heights)
- Van Cortlandtville Elementary School (Mohegan Lake)

=== Middle Schools (6-8) ===
- Lakeland Copper Beech Middle School (Yorktown Heights)

=== High Schools (9-12) ===
- Lakeland High School (Shrub Oak)
- Walter Panas High School (Cortlandt Manor)

== Notable alumni ==
T.C. Boyle, author, also taught at Lakeland High School from 1968 to 1972

Melissa Gonzalez, member of the United States Women's Field Hockey Team

Lawrence Lindsey (1972), economist, former member of the Board of Governors of the Federal Reserve, professor at Harvard University

Jeffrey Herbst, graduated from Walter Panas High School, previously the 16th president of Colgate University
