= Yorktown Grange Fair =

Annual Agricultural Fair

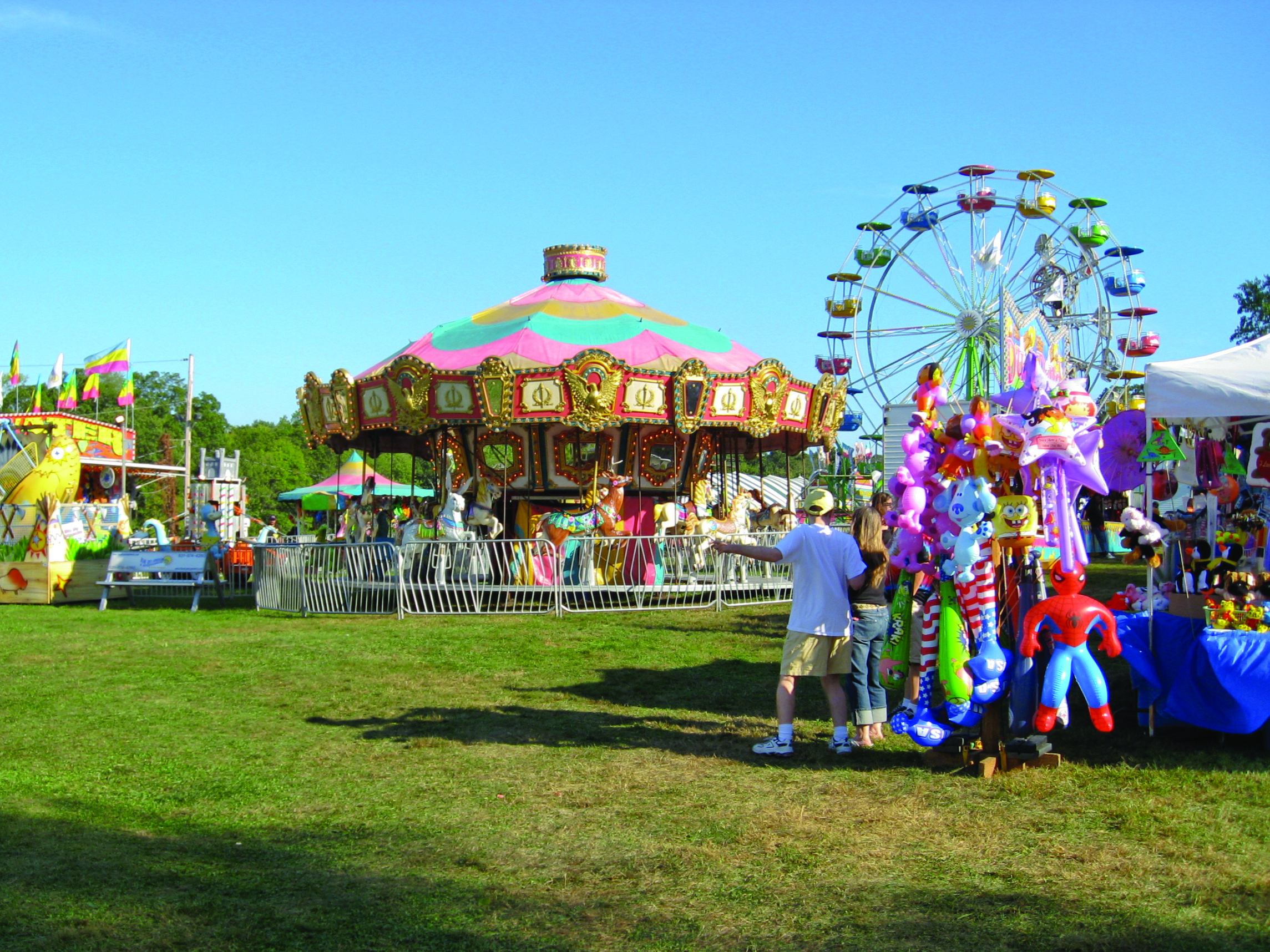
- Carousel at 2008 Yorktown Grange Fair
- Status: Active
- Genre: Grange fair
- Frequency: Annual
- Venue: Yorktown Grange Fairgrounds
- Locations: 99 Moseman Road, Yorktown Heights, New York
- Years active: 1924-41, 1946-2019, 2021 to present
- Website: https://yorktowngrangefair.org

The Yorktown Grange Fair is an annual event held in Yorktown Heights, New York. It features agricultural and educational exhibits, community participation activities, entertainment, food and carnival rides. It is presented by the Yorktown Grange Agricultural Society, a 501(c)(3) not-for-profit corporation.

== History ==
=== Early history of the fair ===
The first Grange Fair was held October 19, 1923. The early displays of produce, baking and flowers were auctioned off after being judged, creating a traditional finale to the fair, which continues today.

World War II caused the fair to be cancelled from 1942 to 1945.

In September 1954, the fair was held on the Moseman Road fairgrounds for the first time. In December 1954, the Fair Association was formed to organize and implement the fair.

=== The Grange Fair, 1950s to today ===
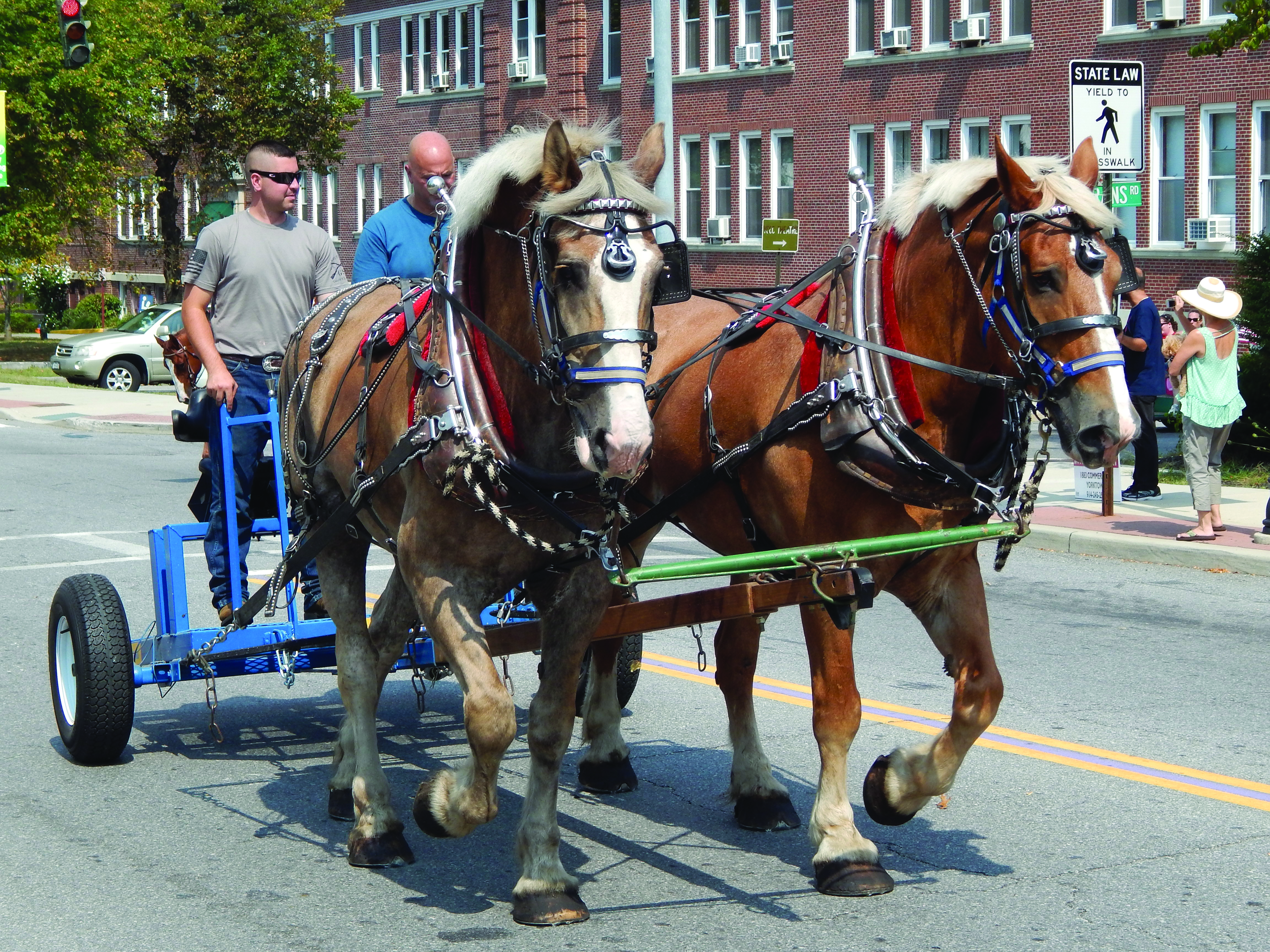
Tractor Parade, 2014

Since the 1950s, the Grange Fair has adapted to the changing demographics of northern Westchester. As a "country" fair, the event features traditional agricultural and livestock exhibits and blue ribbon competitions, an antique tractor parade and exhibit, craft and food vendors, and a midway with rides and games. In recent years the fair has added photography, art and Lego-building contests to the ribbon competitions.

The tractor parade is held at noon on the Saturday of the fair weekend. Antique tractors, some horse-drawn, assemble on Commerce Street and proceed through local roads to the fairgrounds.

The Annual Grange Fair starts the Friday after Labor Day on the Moseman Avenue fairgrounds. The fair is organized and staffed by volunteers, primarily members of Yorktown Grange #862. It provides an opportunity for local youth to showcase their animal husbandry skills. Backyard gardeners can enter their flowers and vegetables for ribbon awards. Local artists participate in art exhibits and children can compete for Lego ribbons.

There was no fair in 2020.

=== Yorktown Grange Agricultural Society ===
On March 25, 2021, the Yorktown Grange Agricultural Society was incorporated in the State of New York as a not-for-profit corporation, replacing the Grange Fair Association.

== Recognition ==
- Resolution of the New York State Legislature dated May 6, 2024 commemorating the 100th Anniversary of the Yorktown Grange Fair
- Proclamation from the Westchester County Executive, dated September 3, 2019 declaring September 6 to September 8, 2019, Westchester's Grange Weekend.
- New York State Grange First Place Community Service Award, 1954.
- National Grange Community Service Award, 1954.
