= Russ Swan (American football) =

American football player (born 1963)

No. 51
- Position: Linebacker

Personal information
- Born: March 30, 1963 (age 63); Fairview Park, Ohio, U.S.
- Listed height: 6 ft 4 in (1.93 m)
- Listed weight: 223 lb (101 kg)

Career information
- High school: Yorktown (Yorktown Heights, New York)
- College: Virginia
- NFL draft: 1986: undrafted

Career history
- Dallas Cowboys (1987)

Career NFL statistics
- Games played: 5
- Stats at Pro Football Reference

Russell Scott Swan (born March 30, 1963) is an American former professional football player who was a linebacker in the National Football League (NFL) for the Dallas Cowboys. He played college football for the Virginia Cavaliers.

== Early life ==
Swan attended Yorktown High School, where he was a starter at linebacker. He accepted a football scholarship from the University of Virginia, where he was a four-year starter at linebacker. As a freshman, he had 19 tackles in a single-game against Virginia Tech.

As a senior, he led the team with 125 tackles (third in school history), collecting 58 solo tackles, 67 assisted tackles and one interception.

He finished his career as the school's second All-time leading tackler (373), after making 181 solo tackles and 192 assisted tackles.

== Professional career ==
Swan was signed as an undrafted free agent by the Dallas Cowboys after the 1986 NFL draft. He was waived on August 26.

In 1987, he was signed as a free agent by the Dallas Cowboys. He was released on September 1. After the NFLPA strike was declared on the third week of the season, those contests were canceled (reducing the 16 game season to 15) and the NFL decided that the games would be played with replacement players. In September, he was re-signed to be a part of the Dallas replacement team that was given the mock name "Rhinestone Cowboys" by the media. He started 3 games at middle linebacker. On October 27, he was placed on the injured reserve list.
