= Shrub Oak, New York =

- CDP
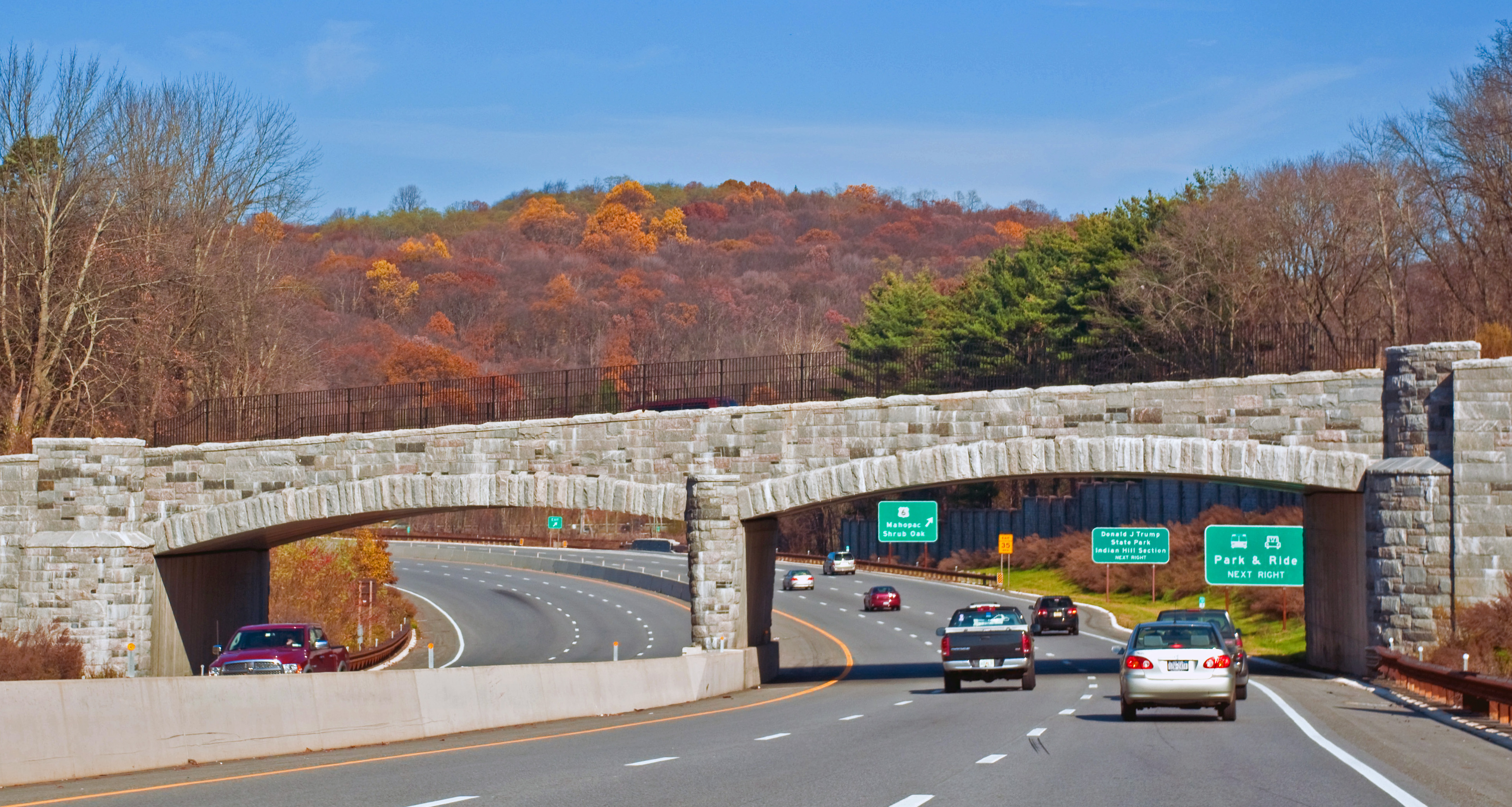
- Stone bridge over the Taconic State Parkway near Shrub Oak

- Location of Shrub Oak, New York
- Coordinates: 41°19′49″N 73°49′47″W
- Country: United States
- State: New York
- County: Westchester
- Town: Yorktown

Area
  - Total: 1.61 sq mi (4.16 km^{2})
  - Land: 1.58 sq mi (4.09 km^{2})
  - Water: 0.027 sq mi (0.07 km^{2})
- Elevation: 440 ft (134 m)

Population (2020)
  - Total: 2,143
  - Density: 1,357.9/sq mi (524.28/km^{2})
- Time zone: UTC-5 (Eastern (EST))
  - Summer (DST): UTC-4 (EDT)
- ZIP code: 10588
- Area code: 914
- FIPS code: 36-67279
- GNIS feature ID: 0965182

Shrub Oak is an unincorporated hamlet and census-designated place (CDP) located in the town of Yorktown in Westchester County, New York, United States. As of the 2020 census, Shrub Oak had a population of 2,143.

== Geography ==
Shrub Oak is located at 41°19′49″N 73°49′47″W (41.330178, -73.829736).

According to the United States Census Bureau, the hamlet has a total area of 1.6 square miles (4.1 km^{2}), of which 0.04 square miles (0.10 km^{2}), or 1.23%, is water.

== Climate ==
According to the Köppen Climate Classification system, Shrub Oak has a humid subtropical climate, abbreviated "Cfa" on climate maps. The hottest temperature recorded in Shrub Oak was 100 °F (37.8 °C) on June 27, 1950, while the coldest temperature recorded was −25 °F (−31.7 °C) on January 22, 1961.

Climate data for Shrub Oak, New York, 1991–2020 normals, extremes 1950–present
Month	Jan	Feb	Mar	Apr	May	Jun	Jul	Aug	Sep	Oct	Nov	Dec	Year
Record high °F (°C)	67 (19)	79 (26)	81 (27)	92 (33)	95 (35)	100 (38)	99 (37)	97 (36)	98 (37)	91 (33)	83 (28)	68 (20)	100 (38)
Mean daily maximum °F (°C)	36.6 (2.6)	38.9 (3.8)	47.8 (8.8)	60.2 (15.7)	71.0 (21.7)	78.6 (25.9)	83.7 (28.7)	82.8 (28.2)	75.0 (23.9)	63.7 (17.6)	52.1 (11.2)	41.1 (5.1)	61.0 (16.1)
Daily mean °F (°C)	26.9 (−2.8)	29.4 (−1.4)	36.9 (2.7)	48.2 (9.0)	58.9 (14.9)	67.1 (19.5)	72.4 (22.4)	71.5 (21.9)	63.7 (17.6)	52.6 (11.4)	41.8 (5.4)	32.7 (0.4)	50.2 (10.1)
Mean daily minimum °F (°C)	17.1 (−8.3)	19.8 (−6.8)	26.0 (−3.3)	36.1 (2.3)	46.7 (8.2)	55.6 (13.1)	61.1 (16.2)	60.2 (15.7)	52.4 (11.3)	41.4 (5.2)	31.5 (−0.3)	24.2 (−4.3)	39.3 (4.1)
Record low °F (°C)	−25 (−32)	−21 (−29)	−13 (−25)	10 (−12)	25 (−4)	32 (0)	40 (4)	33 (1)	21 (−6)	16 (−9)	7 (−14)	−18 (−28)	−25 (−32)
Average precipitation inches (mm)	3.61 (92)	3.04 (77)	4.36 (111)	3.90 (99)	4.32 (110)	4.52 (115)	4.72 (120)	4.31 (109)	4.60 (117)	4.63 (118)	3.67 (93)	4.85 (123)	50.53 (1,284)
Source 1: NOAA
Source 2: xmACIS2

== Demographics ==
Historical population
Census	Pop.	Note	%±
2020	2,143		—
U.S. Decennial Census

At the 2000 census there were 1,812 people, 601 households, and 495 families residing in the hamlet (of Yorktown). The population density was 1,127.3 inhabitants per square mile (435.3/km^{2}). There were 612 housing units at an average density of 380.8 per square mile (147.0/km^{2}). The racial makeup of the hamlet was 93.16% White, 2.21% African American, 0.39% Native American, 1.16% Asian, 1.93% from other races, and 1.16% from two or more races. Hispanic or Latino of any race were 8.66%.

Of the 601 households, 45.6% had children under the age of 18 living with them, 68.6% were married couples living together, 8.5% had a female householder with no husband present, and 17.5% were non-families. 14.1% of households were one person, and 5.5% were one person aged 65 or older. The average household size was 3.01 and the average family size was 3.35.

In the hamlet the population was spread out, with 29.4% under the age of 18, 6.5% from 18 to 24, 31.3% from 25 to 44, 24.2% from 45 to 64, and 8.6% 65 or older. The median age was 36 years. For every 100 females, there were 95.7 males. For every 100 females age 18 and over, there were 95.9 males.

The median household income was $80,108 and the median family income was $87,226. Males had a median income of $59,432 versus $36,523 for females. The per capita income for the hamlet was $29,499. About 2.2% of families and 2.4% of the population were below the poverty line, including 4.3% of those under age 18 and none of those age 65 or over.

== Education ==
Almost all of the Shrub Oak census-designated place is in the Lakeland Central School District, while a small portion is in the Yorktown Central School District.

== Shrub Oak in literature ==
The writer Clifford A. Pickover has used Shrub Oak as a backdrop in several of his books, including Sex, Drugs, Einstein and Elves, "Liquid Earth (Neoreality Series)" and A Beginner's Guide to Immortality. Pickover has written fifty books.

The stamp collector, philatelic writer and dealer, Herman Herst lived in Shrub Oak, which he mentions in many of his writings. He also set up a local post in Shrub Oak.

T. C. Boyle uses Shrub Oak as setting for his short story "All Shook Up".
