= Charlie Gasparino =

American journalist

- Born: Charles Gasparino; The Bronx, New York, U.S.
- Education: Pace University (BA); University of Missouri (MA)
- Occupation: Business journalist
- Spouse: Virginia Juliano

Charles Gasparino is an American journalist, blogger, and occasional radio host. He is the senior correspondent for Fox Business and a columnist for the NY Post.

== Early life and education ==
Gasparino was born in the Bronx into an Italian American family and graduated with a B.A. from Pace University before earning his master's degree in journalism from the University of Missouri.

== Career ==
Gasparino reported for Newsweek, where he covered politics, Wall Street, and corporate America. Among other stories, he broke the story on the controversial pay package of former New York Stock Exchange chairman Richard Grasso, former New York City Police Commissioner Bernard Kerik's controversial (and eventually withdrawn) nomination to run the US Department of Homeland Security, and the dispute surrounding former New York Attorney General (and eventual Governor) Eliot Spitzer's crackdown on corporate crime.

Before working at Newsweek, Gasparino was a reporter for The Wall Street Journal. During his time at the WSJ he wrote extensively on issues on Wall Street, including pension funds, mutual funds and regulatory issues. He won the New York Press Club award for coverage of Wall Street research scandals. Gasparino then moved to cable business network CNBC where he reported extensively on Wall Street. During the 2008 financial crisis, Gasparino played a major role in CNBC's coverage, breaking a number of stories, including the news that the U.S. Government was going to bail out insurer AIG, as well as news of the US government's broader bailout of the financial system, the Troubled Asset Relief Program (TARP).

Gasparino, known for being highly combative on-air (Marketwatch described him as "Fox's Rocky Balboa"), was reported in The Washington Post as saying that "[his] job was to rip the lungs out of the competition for Fox Business Network."

A Financial Times profile of Gasparino illustrates his combativeness, describing him as a "pugnacious pundit Wall Street can't ignore", citing as examples Gasparino's frequent run-ins with colleagues, including then-fellow CNBC reporter Dennis Kneale, and cycling star Lance Armstrong. Despite his aggressiveness, his reporting frequently has a dramatic impact on the markets. The Financial Times quotes Goldman Sachs's then-chief spokesman Lucas Van Praag as saying "Most trading floors have CNBC on with the sound turned down, but when Charlie comes on, they listen.... [H]e does move stock prices." Similarly, Gasparino's then-colleague at CNBC Lawrence Kudlow said of him: "He broke some great stories. I give Charlie a lot of credit for having great sources and, to tell you the truth, most of his steers have been good. He has got us ahead of the game."

=== Move to Fox ===
In February 2010, Gasparino left CNBC for the fledgling Fox Business Network. In addition to his book writing, Gasparino appears on Fox Business and Fox News Channel with news reports and commentary, as well as contributing regularly to The New York Post and Forbes and online for The Daily Beast, Huffington Post, and FoxBusiness.com.

At Fox, Gasparino has broken stories on, among others, the US government's plans to sell its stake in Citigroup and the government's pressure on Bank of America to shrink itself. In one dig at his former channel, while CNBC was interviewing John Mack, chairman of Morgan Stanley, who declared on air that "[t]his doesn't feel like the crisis that I went through [in 2008], so I feel a lot better about it," Gasparino timed his report of Morgan Stanley's laying off 1,200 workers and closing up to 300 branches so that it aired opposite the interview. Although notably combative towards his former network ("My job is to come up with a scoop (everyday) and promote that scoop," he said. "Just jam it down CNBC's throat every single day."), Gasparino has also spoken highly of his former colleagues, calling Maria Bartiromo "a good reporter", Erin Burnett "a class act -- I used to love doing TV with her", and of Jim Cramer, "I like Jim personally." In response to accusations of being as much a showman as a journalist, Gasparino has said, "You want to be entertaining when you present news. People don't want a droll Charlie Gasparino droning on about Merrill Lynch."

In 2010, Marketwatch named Gasparino one of "12 Broadcasters Who Are Making a Difference", and The Daily Beast called him one of the "Top 15 "Economic and Business Commentators" (and the only television journalist on the list).

Gasparino also posts breaking news updates on Twitter and for several years regularly filled in for John Batchelor on Friday nights as the host of "The John Batchelor Show" on WABC-AM in New York City.

In July 2024, Gasparino was widely criticized by left-wing politicians and commentators for writing an editorial referring to Vice President Kamala Harris as the United States' first potential "DEI president". His comments were described as "a de facto racial slur" for suggesting Harris, who has held multiple high-profile elected offices, only received those positions due to her race and gender, but such criticism omitted President Biden's own comments that stated he would pick a woman of color as his running mate, thus omitting others.

=== Pulitzer nominee claim ===
Gasparino's biographical snippets on websites and his own personal statements have occasionally claimed that Gasparino is a Pulitzer Prize nominee, a term used by many reporters about their work when it's submitted by their newspaper after an internal nominating process. Still, Gasparino was criticized for this by investigative reporter Bill Dedman since he was not a "nominated finalist" even though Gasparino's investigative reporting was submitted by the editors of the Wall Street Journal after an internal nominating process to the Pulitzer Nominating Juries. Fox Business updated his biography to more precisely say that his work "was submitted for the Pulitzer" rather than being a nominee.

== Books ==
In 2005, Gasparino wrote Blood on the Street: The Sensational Inside Story of How Wall Street Analysts Duped a Generation of Investors, published by Free Press. In November 2007, HarperCollins released Gasparino's second book, King of the Club: Richard Grasso and the Survival of the New York Stock Exchange, which covered the rise and fall of former New York Stock Exchange head Richard Grasso, from the outrage occasioned by his near-$140 million compensation package.

His next book, covering the financial crisis from its inception in the 1970s to the present day, its impact on the economy and on the financial markets, is entitled The Sellout: How Wall Street Greed and Government Mismanagement Destroyed America's Global Financial System, and was published by HarperCollins in November 2009.

A New York Times bestseller, The Wall Street Journal, USA Today, and Library Journal all named it one of the best business books of 2009, and it received the 2009 Investigative Reporters and Editors Award for Books.

Gasparino's book, Bought and Paid For: The Unholy Alliance Between Barack Obama and Wall Street, was published by Sentinel, a dedicated conservative imprint of publisher Penguin Putnam, on October 5, 2010. His latest book, Go Woke Go Broke was published by Center Street in August, 2024.

Works

- Blood on the Street. ISBN 978-0-7432-7651-1
- King of the Club. ISBN 978-0-06-089833-5
- The Sellout. ISBN 978-0-06-169716-6
- Bought and Paid For. ISBN 978-1-59523-071-3
