= Yorktown Central School District =

School district in the U.S. state of New York

Coordinates: 41.2688°N 73.7861°W

Location
- 2725 Crompond Road; Yorktown Heights, New York 10598 United States

District information
- Motto: Inspiring students, parents and staff to strive together for excellence
- Grades: K-12
- Superintendent: Dr. Ron Hattar

Students and staff
- District mascot: Corn Husker
- Colors: Green and White

Other information
- Website: www.yorktown.org

Yorktown Central School District is a school district in Yorktown Heights, New York.

It operates the following schools:

- Brookside Elementary School - Grades K-3
- Mohansic Elementary School - Grades K-3
- Crompond Elementary School - Grades 4-5
- Mildred E. Strang Middle School - Grades 6-8
- Yorktown High School

== History ==
Ralph Napolitano became superintendent circa 2006. Napolitano was criticized for abruptly firing the principal of Yorktown High School in February 2008. He retired in 2017.

In 2016 the district had 3,400 students. The district was named "School District of Character" in 2016.

Ronald Hattar became the superintendent in 2017.
