= Westchester–Putnam Council =

Boy Scouts of America local council

Westchester-Putnam Council (#388)
- Owner: Boy Scouts of America
- Headquarters: Hawthorne, NY
- Country: United States
- Founded: 1973
- Defunct: 2020
- President: Paxton Louis
- Council Commissioner: Fred Compton
- Scout Executive: Richard Stockton
- Website wpcbsa.org

Westchester–Putnam Council was a local council of the Boy Scouts of America, serving Boy Scouts in southeastern New York State. It merged with the Hudson Valley Council in January 2021 to become the Greater Hudson Valley Council.

== History ==
Before 1920, both Westchester and Putnam counties were served by many individual councils that were based in the cities of the area. Among them were Bronxville (founded 1919), Mamaroneck (1917), Mount Vernon, New Rochelle, Peekskill (1918), Pelham (1910), Rye (5/29/1913), White Plains (1918) and Yonkers Councils. On July 18, 1919, James West oversaw the merger of many of these councils into a Westchester County Council with jurisdiction over all troops not already in a Class 1 council. Its headquarters was in White Plains. The only Class 1 councils in Westchester at the time appear to have been Mount Vernon and Yonkers.

Westchester County Council split in 1922 along east/west lines into the Siwanoy Council, serving troops along Westchester's Long Island Sound and the Hendrick Hudson Council, serving troops along the Hudson River from Hastings to Peekskill. Mount Vernon Council changed its name to the Bronx Valley Council and absorbed several inland towns including Bronxville. White Plains and the northern and eastern half of Westchester as well as the eastern portion of Putnam County were included in the James Fenimore Cooper Council. In 1958, the Bronx Valley Council merged with the Siwanoy Council, forming the Siwanoy-Bronx Valley Council. The name was later changed to Hutchinson River Council in 1962.

In northern Westchester, the Hendrick Hudson Council, which served the villages along the Hudson River Hastings north to Peekskill, and the James Fennimore Cooper Council, which served the White Plains-Bedford-Brewster area, merged to form the Washington Irving Council in 1950. The Yonkers Council was later absorbed in 1955. In 1973, the Washington Irving Council merged with Hutchinson River Council to form the present-day Westchester–Putnam Council, originally headquartered in White Plains. In 1993, the council headquarters were relocated to the current location in Hawthorne, New York.

In its final form, the Westchester–Putnam Council consisted of four Districts: Muscoot, Manitoga, Mohican, and Algonquin. At one time, there were two other districts: Wiccopee District serving Phillipstown, Putnam Valley, Peekskill, Cortlandt and Yorktown in the Westchester–Putnam area (later served by the Manitoga District) and Four Rivers District which formerly served Yonkers and was later served by Algonquin and Mohican.

== Organization ==
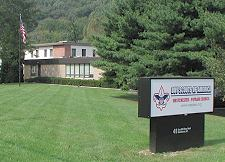
Westchester–Putnam Council office

The Westchester–Putnam Council was divided into five districts:

- Algonquin District, serving Bronxville, Crestwood, Eastchester, Edgemont, Harrison, Larchmont, Mamaroneck, Mount Vernon, New Rochelle, Pelham, Port Chester, Purchase, Rye, Rye Brook, Scarsdale, and Tuckahoe. Algonquin District
- Manitoga District, serving Briarcliff Manor, Buchanan, Chappaqua, Cold Spring, Continental Village, Cortlandt, Crompond, Croton, Crugers, Furnace Woods, Garrison, Jefferson Valley, Kitchawan, Lake Mohegan, Millwood, Montrose, North Highland, Nelsonville, Ossining, Peekskill, Phillipstown, Putnam Valley, Scarborough, Shrub Oak, Toddville, Van Cortlandtville, Verplanck, Yorktown, and Yorktown Heights Manitoga District
- Mohican District, serving Ardsley, Dobbs Ferry, Elmsford, Greenburg, Hartsdale, Hastings-on-Hudson, Hawthorne, Irvington, North White Plains, Pleasantville, Sleepy Hollow, Tarrytown, Thornwood, Valhalla, White Plains, and Yonkers. Mohican District
- Muscoot District, serving Armonk, Bedford Village, Bedford Hills, Brewster, Carmel, Croton Falls, Goldens Bridge, Katonah, Kent, Lake Carmel, Lewisboro, Lincolndale, Mahopac, Mahopac Falls, Pound Ridge, No. Salem, Patterson, Pound Ridge, Putnam Lake, Shenorock, Somers, South Salem, and Vista Muscoot District
- New Horizons District, serving in-school programs for minority and low-income residents

== Camps and other properties ==
=== Curtis S. Read Scout Reservation ===
Curtis S. Read Scout Reservation, also known as Camp Read, is a camp located in the Adirondack Mountains in Brant Lake, New York. It consists of three camps: Waubeeka, Buckskin, and Summit Base. There are two dirt roads that make most of the camp accessible by car in the warmer months. The name Camp Read was used for several Boy Scout camps operated by the Council and its predecessors since the 1920s. The present-day Camp Read was named in 1949.

==== Camp Waubeeka ====
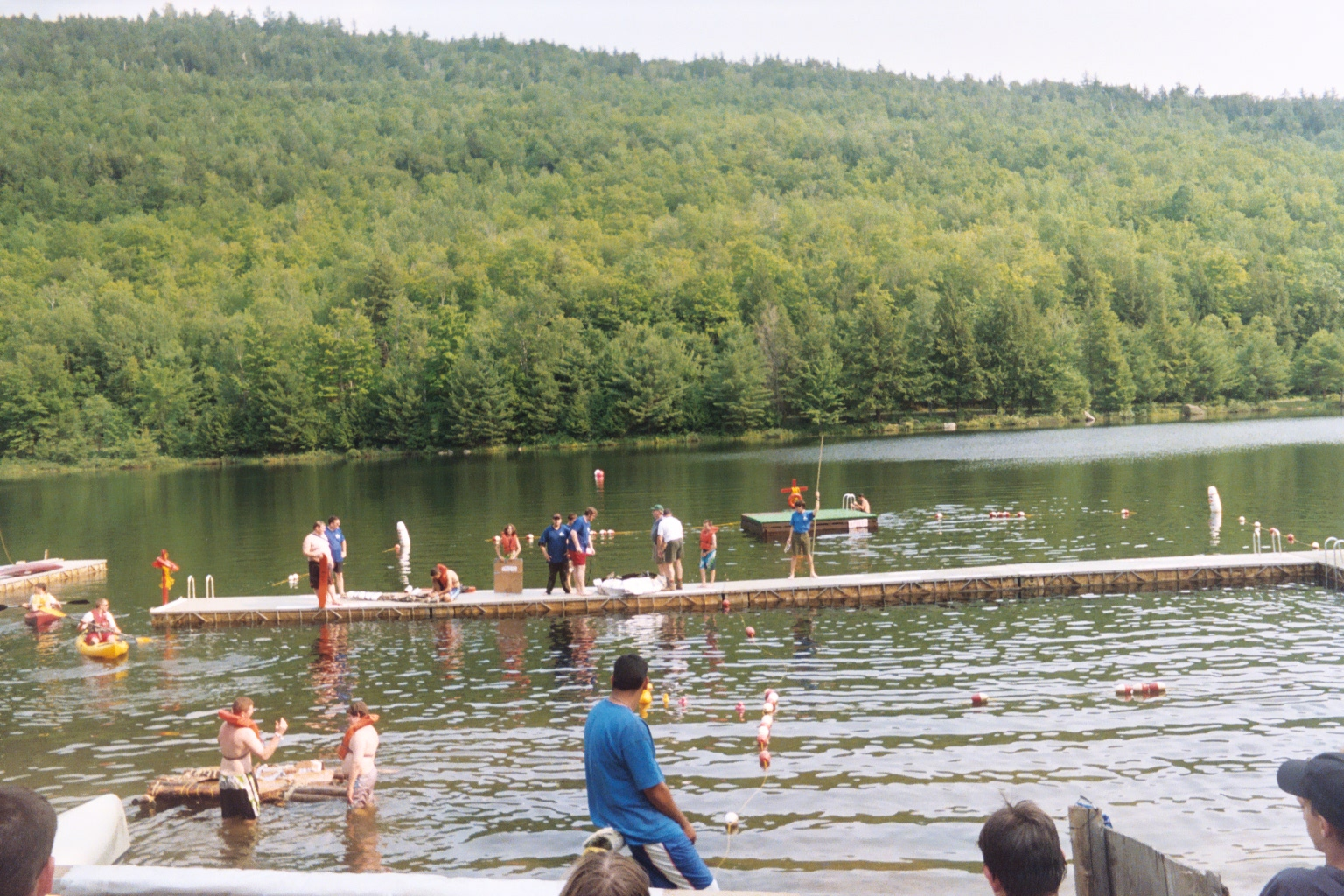
A boat race in Waubeeka Lake

Camp Waubeeka, which opened in 1969, is a patrol cooking camp. When it first opened, and for the first few years of its existence, the camp was named Camp Proposed; a name derived from the words "proposed camp" on the original reservation plan. Boy Scout troops come to Camp Waubeeka to camp-out in tents and earn merit badges in a variety of disciplines: Waterfront, Scoutcraft, Ecology and Conservation (or "ECON"), and Handicraft. In order to earn the Horsemanship and Climbing merit badges, Scouts must use the in-camp transportation provided to those class locations.

In Camp Waubeeka, Scouts cook their own meals in a patrol-style cook site. Scouts pick up ingredients for each meal at the Commissary building. Food is cooked on top of cast-ironwood-burning stoves called sheepherders or on top of a half-barrel grill. No food is stored in the campsites, but utensils and condiments can be kept in large patrol boxes, called "monster boxes" which are locked at night to keep animals away from the campsites.

The camp has its own man-made lake, Waubeeka Lake, where Small Boat Sailing merit badge classes are offered and the camp-wide "Cardboard Boat Race" took place until 2012. The "water carnival" in which the cardboard boat race was a segment, has been replaced in 2013 with a trebuchet building contest. Small-Boat Sailing is made available for Scouts from Buckskin, because the Buckskin waterfront is unsuitable for this type of watercraft.

Waubeeka has a large group of staff members serving Scouts in each Merit Badge program area and in the Commissary, trading post, quartermaster's office and camp office. The quartermaster's office rations out cooking equipment weekly.

Camp Waubeeka has seven functional campsites: Cascade, Avalanche, Wolfjaw, Polaris, Sunrise, Haystack, and Hurricane. Camp Waubeeka also has three decommissioned campsites, Cobble and Skylight, which were abandoned in the mid-1990s and are currently used for nature observation. Klondike Notch, which was removed when nearby Rose Drive was constructed, has been out of existence since the 1980s. Scouts traveling on the designated trails through these areas can see old cots, platforms, fire rings, a flagpole, and an old latrine. Showers and latrines are located throughout the camp for general use. In 2010, Camp Waubeeka received a new camp shower house, known colloquially as the Wolfjaw Showers due to its location next to Wolfjaw Campsite.

==== Camp Buckskin ====
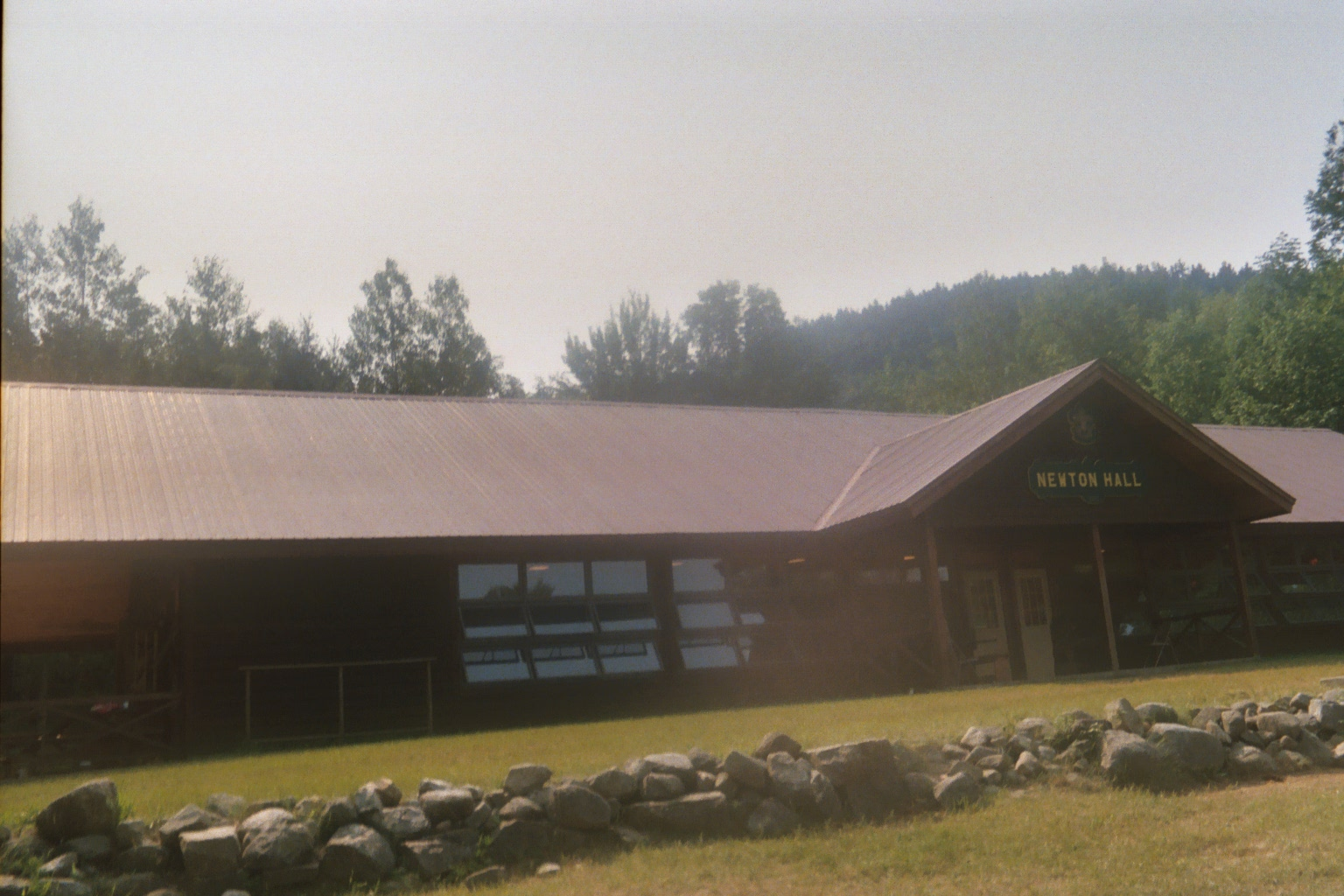
Newton Hall, the dining hall for Buckskin

Camp Buckskin is the largest camp on the reservation where Scouts can camp out in platform tents and earn merit badges. There are fourteen different campsites, among them Teheco, Pawnee, Ranger, and Blackfoot. Throughout the course of the summer there are a variety of events and competitions. There are also opening and closing campfires every week.

Scouts eat three meals a day in Newton Hall, the main dining hall, unless they are enrolled in the Cooking merit badge program of study. The option is also available for troops to cook meals at their own campsites. The field in front of Newton Hall is known as the "parade field" where ceremonies such as the daily lowering and raising of the flag take place. The field is also used for recreational purposes, like games of Ultimate Frisbee or soccer. Located nearby are the First Aid office, Main Office, campfire area and Trading Post. At present, it is not known how much of an effect recently implemented tariffs will have on the day to day operations of the trading post.

Camp Buckskin has its own lake, known as Rogers Lake. At the waterfront, Scouts can earn aquatics merit badges, participate in instructional swim courses or just check out rowboats, canoes or other watercraft.

Campers can earn merit badges in the Scoutcraft, Handicraft, Aquatics, Ecology (known as the "ECON" Lodge for "ecology" and "conservation"), and Field Sports program areas. These different areas offer a wide variety of merit badges; including some Eagle Scout required merit badges such as Camping, Environmental Science, First Aid, Swimming, Lifesaving and Emergency Preparedness. For merit badge requirements and recreation, there are shooting ranges for shotguns, rifles, and archery. A program designed for newer Scouts helps orient them to Scouting, camping and rank advancement. Recently, this program was named the Anthony Long Rank Advancement Program in memory of a past staff member.

Showers and latrines are available around the camp. For the summers of 2008, 2009 and 2010, new latrines were built in several locations throughout camp. In 2009 and 2010 three new shower houses with private stalls were erected for usage by the Scouts and leaders.

==== Summit Base ====
Summit Base High Adventure Camp is a nationally recognized and accredited Adirondack High Adventure base camp at Read Scout Reservation. Mount Stevens, a relatively small peak, is located here. Although very small by Adirondack standards, it nevertheless has at least three marked trails to the summit. Though technically not part of Camp Read, at least some have theorized that Read may nevertheless be able to lay claim to it via the doctrine of adverse possession. Mount Stevens has been used as a sort of "proving ground" where experienced voyageurs have taken new voyageurs for intense compressed training. Particular care is emphasized in cooking a perfect Denver omelette. There is a large field and a few campsites, including lean-tos for use by Scouts and adventurers. The elite portion of the staff at Summit Base, called Voyageurs, guide week-long canoe and hiking treks. On occasion the best of the best voyageurs have led two-week treks to cover the entire Northville Lake Placid trail. A climbing tower and showers are available for general use. There is also an opportunity to do combination canoe and backpack treks, which feature a midweek resupply, and sometimes even guest appearances by kitchen staff.

Voyageurs have come from diverse geographic and academic backgrounds, including a notable concentration of alumni from SUNY Buffalo during the mid-to-late 1990s, as well as participants from countries of the former Soviet Union. Alumni have gone on to careers in various fields, including publishing, law, education, and local and federal government service.

Occasionally, logistical constraints prevent Voyageurs from living on camp proper during the season. These self-styled "contract voyageurs" lead their treks during the work week and disappear into the woods of the Adirondacks on weekends and off weeks to further hone their craft.

Because there are still areas of the Adirondacks with no cell phone coverage an ingenious solution was developed for communicating with contract voyageurs. Taking a cue from the past, informal messages would be posted at locations where contract voyageurs were likely to frequent. For a contract voyageur, a trip into town not only provided camaraderie, sustenance and libations, but also a chance for further employment.

Each Voyageur guides treks differently. Perhaps the greatest difference is with respect to the bear bags. Food must be secured at night to prevent pilfering by bears. The standard protocol is to tie one rope between two trees approximately 25 feet above the ground. The bag is then hauled up at the midpoint of the previously strung line. While this method is effective it is time consuming. Consequently, on occasion, voyageurs have resorted to easier methods. Such methods include, but are not limited to, placing the bear bag in a spare canoe that is anchored off shore – and invariably drifts to the shoreline by morning; hanging the bear bag from a pathetically small sapling; sleeping with the bear bag in the voyageurs tent, etc. There have been incidents where the bear bag has been looted.

As all Voyageurs are extremely skilled outdoorsmen and possess a natural acumen for anything related to high adventure activities, Voyageurs are frequently called on to perform other Summit Base activities. Due to the specialized nature of Voyageur training, other summit base staff members cannot lead treks though. In some cases, upper management at Camp have recognized the inherent leadership skills that all Voyageurs possess and have appointed Voyageurs to serve as interim camp directors.

A long dirt road leads to a big grassland where the remnants of an early 20th-century racetrack are located, much of it still visible. Driving camp vehicles is strictly prohibited on the racetrack. The racetrack area is home to a high and low ropes course, known as COPE (Challenging Outdoor Personnel Endeavor). Summit Base also has a man-made lake (pond) where Scouts can use an 80-foot (24 m) zipline. In the past, staff members would rappel off the water tower, often needless fireman brakes were applied.

During the 1960s, Summit Base was known as Camp Tomahawk. Tomahawk formed individual Scouts into provisional troops to participate in activities at Read Scout Reservation with full formal troops. The small man-made lake was then known as Lester's Lake. Until the late 1990s, there were a number of iconic buildings located on board Summit Base. Both the "rock house" and the "voyageur cabin" were burnt down and with the destruction of the buildings, a great deal of summit lore was also lost. Even though the rock house was intentionally burnt down, there were at least two occasions where the building was almost burnt down accidentally. Perhaps the toughest loss was the old dining hall, later affectionately known as TAC (Tomahawk Activity Center) an iconic structure utilized for indoor climbing, "pack shakedown", transient housing and file storage.

There are horse stables located on the reservation where Scouts can earn the Horsemanship merit badge. A small, old-style house located on the reservation is made available in the winter for skiing in the Adirondacks.

=== Durland Scout Reservation ===
Durland Scout Reservation, formerly known as Clear Lake Scout Reservation, is located in Putnam Valley, New York in Putnam County adjacent to Clarence Fahnestock State Park, with many interconnecting trails.

In 1968, environmentalist and National Geographic Society director of exploration William O. Field sold his 1,400 acres (6 km^{2}) of wilderness to the Boy Scouts of America. New York State was also interested in the land to expand the existing Clarence Fahnestock State Park, but Field felt that the Boy Scouts would be better caretakers and keep the land "forever wild." The property became the Clear Lake Scout Reservation. In 1993, the Westchester–Putnam Council had considered a $4.5 million sale to developers who would construct a golf course on the property. After consideration and debate, plans to sell the camp were cancelled.

In 2007, Clear Lake Scout Reservation was renamed for Agatha Durland, who had previously donated waterfront property and a trust to maintain a Scout aquatic center in Rye, New York. With the sale of the Rye property to private developers, the name and trust were transferred to the Clear Lake Scout Reservation property.

Clear Lake offers improved sites for tent camping and unimproved areas for trek and wilderness camping. Cabins and outdoor pavilions are available for rental year-round for various Scout activities. Clear Lake is also one of the sites for the Council's Cub Scout Day Camp summer program.

=== Defunct camps ===
==== Allen Reservation ====
In 1941, a gift from the Allen Foundation was used to purchase 45 acres along Mamaroneck Avenue in Harrison for use as the Allen Scout Reservation. The camp was located across from present-day Saxon Woods Park. The property was sold off in 1977.

==== Camp Chappegat ====
Camp Chappegat was a Scout Camp rented first by the Westchester County Council (1920–1921) and then by Siwanoy Council (1922–1925). It was located near Lake Kanohwahke in Harriman State Park.

==== Camp Collins ====
Camp Collins was a 99-acre Scout Camp located near Oscawana Rd in Putnam Valley, New York, owned by Yonkers Council. It opened prior to 1935 and continued in operation until 1952. In April 1953 it was announced that Camp Collins would close and Yonkers Council would begin sharing space at Camp Bullowa in Stony Point across the Hudson River.

==== Camp Jay Gould ====
Camp Jay Gould was a property near Elmsford owned by the Hendrick Hudson Council obtained in 1947. It was used for short term camping.

==== Camp Muldoon ====
Camp Muldoon was a small 28-acre parcel owned by the Bronx Valley Council in Harrison. Scouts could reach the property by hiking or biking and it was used for short term camping, training and Camporees. The property was sold off in 1959 by the Siwanoy-Bronx Valley Council and the funds were used to purchase an additional 100 acres along Camp Siwanoy's southern flank. The additional Siwanoy land and its buildings became the basis for the Explorer Science Camp and the council's training center.

==== Camp Osborn ====
Camp Osborn was a property owned by the Boy Scouts located near Oscawanna Corners, near the intersection of Canopus Hill Road and Canopus Hollow Road. The 40-acre property was sold off in 1981, with a remaining small 26-acre parcel sold off in 1984.

==== Camp Siwanoy ====
Camp Siwanoy Patch circa 1960s

Camp Siwanoy was a 740-acre Scout Camp located in Wingdale, New York, which opened in 1926. A popular year-round camp with Scouts from all over the Westchester–Putnam region, attendance for summer camp fell off in the late 1980s. Attendance had dropped so much that summer camp activities were closed in 1987. Summer camp resumed at Siwanoy for the 1988 and 1989 seasons, but attendance continued to wane. Looking to consolidate the summer camp program to Camp Read, the Council decided to close Camp Siwanoy for good in the late 1990s. The address of the camp was 240 Duell Hollow Road, Wingdale, NY 12594. The property is linked to Getaway LLC that uses the same address. The main owner of Getaway LLC is financier and investor Paul Tudor Jones.

==== Camp Waubeeka ====
Camp Waubeeka has been a Boy Scout camp at four sites. It was originally operated in 1922–23 by the now-defunct Bronx Valley council in Danbury, Connecticut. The name was then transferred to a camp in Crugers, New York, also run under the auspices of Bronx Valley Council. A site in Copake, New York, was purchased in 1927 and summer camping began there in 1928. The camp existed there until 1972 continuing under the ownership of the Siwanoy-Bronx Valley Council and Hutchinson River Councils. The Waubeeka name was carried north and is now one of three camps at the Curtis S. Read Scout Reservation, which opened in 1949. The Camp Waubeeka property in Copake was sold by successor Westchester–Putnam Council in 1975. A portion of the proceeds from the sale went towards financing the debt on the purchase of the Clear Lake property.

==== Camp Wiccopee ====
The Hendrick Hudson Council once owned a 400-acre property of unknown name on Roaring Brook near Millwood and Ossining. It was sold to New York State for $30,000 in 1928. James Carter, president of the council, authorized the sale in wake of the state's offer. The land was used for Echo Lake State Park and an NYSDOT Maintenance Yard. The Council later operated the 236-acre Camp Wiccopee at Thompkins Corners (Cold Spring). In 1934, Scouts renovated an old farmhouse on the Camp Wiccopee property into Rotary Lodge with the help of local Rotary Clubs across the district. The dining room had a capacity of 96 Scouts. The camp office and infirmary were located on the second floor. The camp had a capacity of 100–150 boys. The camp was closed 1941–1948 due to wartime material restrictions, but reopened for the 1948 season. It is unknown when this camp first opened, but it appears that successor Washington Irving Council placed the property on the market in the early 1950s. Summer homes on the Camp Wiccopee property were being advertised in 1954.

==== Curtis S. Read Memorial Camp ====
Curtis S. Read Memorial Scout Camp opened on the shores of Long Pond, near Lake Mahopac in Putnam County, in 1920. The camp's capacity was 50 boys, and was supervised by S.P. Hines, the local Scout Executive. Camp Read would later move to Camp Waubeeka in Copake, New York, and Siwanoy in Wingdale, New York, before finding a permanent home in the Adirondacks in 1949.

==== Durland Aquatic Scout Center ====
Located at 310 Stuyvesant Avenue on Milton Point, in Rye, Durland Scout Center was one of only two Boy Scout properties on the Long Island Sound other than Baiting Hollow Scout Camp in Calverton, New York. It was built through the generosity of poet Agatha A. Durland, who died on December 5, 1963. Durland's will left a 2.68-acre estate (Harbor Lights) and $2 million to what was then the Hutchinson River Council. The trust was to continue for a period of 20 years, during which time the income was to be used for the benefit of Durland Scout Center. Upon termination of the trust, the principal was to be distributed to the council on condition that it execute an agreement providing for the continuance of the Durland Scout Center.

The Center included an Olympic size swimming pool, a ham radio station, boating center, facilities for SCUBA diving and several conference rooms.

On February 23, 2004, the Westchester–Putnam Council Executive Board voted to put Durland Scout Center up for sale and to commence a court proceeding in order to confirm that the sale of the center and reestablishment of Camp Durland at the Clear Lake Scout Reservation were consistent with the terms of Durland's will. During the summer of 2004, the Council initiated the will construction proceeding with the Westchester County Surrogate's Court. In a decision dated December 14, 2004, the court held that the will permits the Council to sell and relocate Camp Durland and reestablish it, leaving to the Council's discretion what facilities and activities needed to be provided at Clear Lake Scout Reservation. The property was listed for sale in February 2005 at $8,700,000.

In the summer of 2007, the Durland Scout Center was closed and the property was sold to private developers. The proceeds are being used to develop other camp facilities in the Council.

==== Purdy Scout Reservation ====
The 48-acre Purdy Scout Reservation was a Boy Scout camp located in White Plains, New York, which opened in 1950. John G. "Tiny" Sperling was the Camp Ranger; Sperling Pond at Durland Scout Reservation was named in his honor. In 1978, the council sold the 48-acre site to business park developers for $3 million. By this time, the camp was surrounded by suburban development, office parks, and I-287; all of which made for a less-than-ideal camping experience. The sale finally closed in 1982.

== Order of the Arrow ==
Ktemaque Lodge
- Founded: 1973
- Lodge Chief: Joshua S U.
- Lodge Adviser: Robert Carlson
- Staff Adviser: John Babbage
- Website ktemaque.org

Hanigus Lodge in 1930

Westchester–Putnam Council was also home to the Ktemaque Lodge of the Order of the Arrow.

One of the oldest OA lodges in the organization, it trace dits roots to Chappegat Lodge formed in 1923. Chappegat was originally chartered to the Siwanoy Council. In 1957, Chappegat merged with Hanigus (formed in 1930 and chartered to the Bronx Valley Council) to form Mide. The merged lodge was chartered to the Hutchinson River Council.

Up north, Wiccopee was formed in 1936 and chartered to Hendrick Hudson Council. This lodge disbanded in 1947 and reformed in 1948 as Great Horned Owl. In 1943, Wakoda was formed and chartered to the Fennimore Cooper Council. Great Horned Owl 86 was merged into Wakoda in 1951. Back south, Kitchawonk 32 was formed in 1927 and chartered to Yonkers Council. The lodge rechartered in 1947 as Tahawus 32. In 1955, Tahawus was merged into Wakoda Lodge and became Horicon 247, chartered with Washington Irving Council.

In 1973, Horicon was merged into Mide 15 to become Ktemaque, chartered with the newly formed Westchester–Putnam Council. Ktemaque is a Delaware Indian word meaning "from the land of the beaver," harkening back to the original totem of Chappegat Lodge. Order of the Arrow was very active in the region, helping to organize Eager Beaver weekends to help maintain the council's Scout camps and facilities.

== See also ==
- Durland Scout Reservation
- Defunct local councils of the Boy Scouts of America
- Scouting in New York
