= Verplanck, New York =

- Census-designated place
- Location of Verplanck, New York
- Coordinates: 41°15′11″N 73°57′35″W
- Country: United States
- State: New York
- County: Westchester
- Town: Cortlandt

Area
  - Total: 1.36 sq mi (3.51 km^{2})
  - Land: 0.60 sq mi (1.56 km^{2})
  - Water: 0.75 sq mi (1.95 km^{2})
- Elevation: 59 ft (18 m)

Population (2020)
  - Total: 1,535
  - Density: 2,550.9/sq mi (984.91/km^{2})
  - Demonym: Pointer
- Time zone: UTC-5 (Eastern (EST))
  - Summer (DST): UTC-4 (EDT)
- ZIP code: 10596
- Area code: 914
- FIPS code: 36-77211
- GNIS feature ID: 0968509

Verplanck is a hamlet and census-designated place (CDP) in the town of Cortlandt, New York, United States. As of the 2020 census, Verplanck had a population of 1,535. Both the hamlet and Verplanck's Point derive their name from the activities of the Verplanck family, established in New Amsterdam by Abraham Isaacsen Verplanck in the 1630s.

== History ==
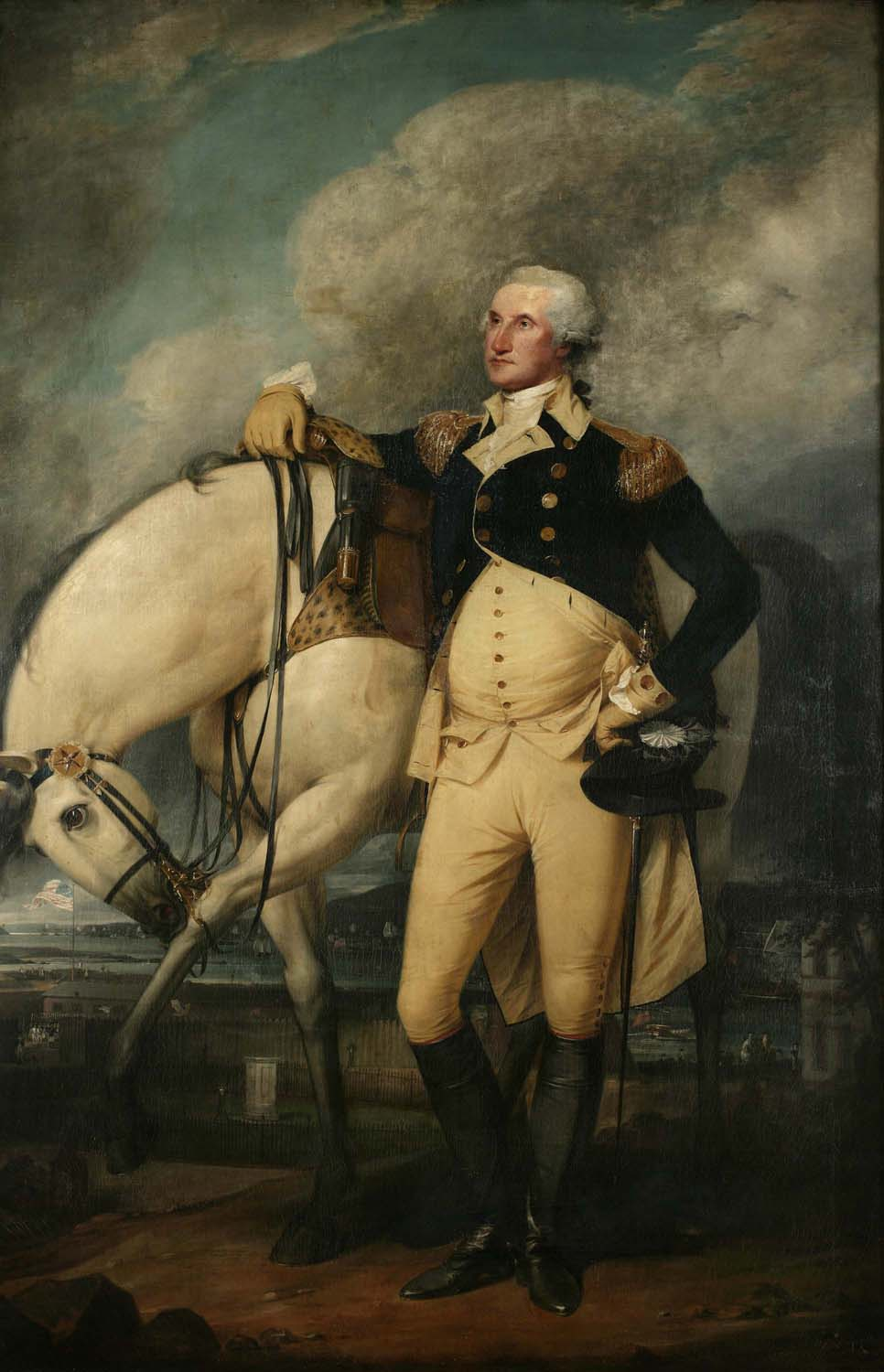
Washington at Verplanck's Point, by John Trumbull (1790)

Verplanck lies on a small peninsula in the extreme northwest of the town of Cortlandt. Tucked along the east bank of the Hudson River, it is bordered by Cortlandt's village of Buchanan and hamlet of Montrose.

=== Verplanck's Point ===
Verplanck's Point lies at Verplanck's southernmost end. The Continental Army of General George Washington encamped at Verplanck's Point during the Revolutionary War, as a staging area for crossing the Hudson at adjacent Kings Ferry, lying between the Point and Montrose. Pursued by the army of British General William Howe, it crossed to Stony Point on the west bank, en route to Fort Lee, New Jersey. From there it continued south to Yorktown, Virginia, where Washington received the surrender of General Charles Cornwallis on October 19, 1781.

A year later, in September 1782, Verplanck's Point, an alluvial plain and natural place for an encampment during the inherent bottleneck of an arduous and slow ferrying of men and materiel across the river, again became the site of the Continental Army's bivouac upon crossing the Hudson.

John Trumbull painted a full-length oil portrait of Washington at Verplanck's Point, and gifted it to Martha Washington. Based on its success he produced a much larger work scaled up to nearly four times its size for the City of New York, George Washington, substituting Evacuation Day of New York City in 1783 as its backdrop for departing French commander-in-chief General Rochambeau's review of Washington's Continental Army troops on September 14, 1782.

== Geography ==
Verplanck is located at 41°15′11″N 73°57′35″W (41.252930, -73.959664).

According to the United States Census Bureau, the hamlet has a total area of 0.8 square miles (2.1 km^{2}), of which 0.7 square miles (1.8 km^{2}) is land and 0.1 square miles (0.26 km^{2}), or 11.54%, is water.

== Demographics ==
Historical population
Census	Pop.	Note	%±
2020	1,535		—
U.S. Decennial Census

As of the census of 2000, there were 777 people, 300 households, and 204 families residing in the hamlet. The population density was 1,121.1 inhabitants per square mile (432.9/km^{2}). There were 311 housing units at an average density of 448.7 units per square mile (173.2 units/km^{2}). The racial makeup of the hamlet was 95.88% White, 0.26% Asian, 2.19% from other races, and 1.67% from two or more races. Hispanic or Latino of any race were 6.82% of the population.

There were 300 households, out of which 33.7% had children under the age of 18 living with them, 50.7% were married couples living together, 12.7% had a female householder with no husband present, and 32.0% were non-families. 28.7% of all households were made up of individuals, and 14.0% had someone living alone who was 65 years of age or older. The average household size was 2.58 and the average family size was 3.17.

In the hamlet the population was spread out, with 26.1% under the age of 18, 5.9% from 18 to 24, 31.0% from 25 to 44, 23.0% from 45 to 64, and 13.9% who were 65 years of age or older. The median age was 37 years. For every 100 females, there were 88.1 males. For every 100 females age 18 and over, there were 90.7 males.

The median income for a household in the hamlet was $36,548, and the median income for a family was $51,375. Males had a median income of $50,526 versus $27,250 for females. The per capita income for the hamlet was $19,842. About 20.2% of families and 21.9% of the population were below the poverty line, including 17.8% of those under age 18 and 38.0% of those age 65 or over.

In 1985, Verplanck, New York was picked for introduction of the Yugo Hatchback car into the U.S. market.

== Education ==
The school district is Hendrick Hudson School District (HHSD). Hendrick Hudson High School is the district's comprehensive high school.

== Half Moon ==
Verplanck is the home of a replica of the ship the Half Moon, with which Henry Hudson explored the Hudson River.

== The Market on The River ==
From May through October, The Market on the River is hosted on Sunday at the Cortlandt Waterfront Park. Vendors include farmers, coffee roasters, food purveyors, and craft makers.

== Media ==
Verplanck is the setting of the 2000 crime comedy movie Drowning Mona but was not filmed there, generating controversy among residents when the film released due to its insulting portrayal of the town.

== Sources ==
- Chernow, Ron (2010). Washington: A Life. Penguin Press. ISBN 978-1-59420-266-7.
