= Henry Hudson (disambiguation) =

Henry Hudson (c. 1565 – 1611) was an English sea explorer and navigator.

Henry Hudson may refer to:

- Henry Hudson (artist) (born 1982), British artist
- Henry E. Hudson (born 1947), United States district court judge for the Eastern District of Virginia
- Henry Louis Hudson (1898–1975), Canadian ice hockey player
- Henry Norman Hudson (died 1886), American scholar of Shakespeare
- Henry Philerin Hudson (1798–1889), Irish music collector

== See also ==
- Hendrick Hudson (disambiguation)
