= Hendrick Hudson =

Hendrick Hudson may refer to:

- Henry Hudson (died 1611), English explorer named in Dutch sources as Hendrick Hudson
- USS Hendrick Hudson, an 1859 ship
- Hendrick Hudson (train), a New York Central corridor train
- Hendrick Hudson Central School District, in Westchester County, New York
  - Hendrick Hudson High School, in Montrose, New York
- Hendrick Hudson Council, formerly a local council of the Boy Scouts of America now within Westchester-Putnam Council
