= Hessian Hills School =

Coordinates: 41°13′16.5″N 73°53′2.9″W

Hessian Hills School (1925–1952) was a progressive school in the Mount Airy neighborhood of Croton-on-Hudson, New York.

== Overview ==
The school was founded as a community school by Elizabeth Moos and Margaret Hatfield. Children were welcomed from age 2 to 15. In 1934, Hessian Hills School, City and Country School in New York City, and five other like-minded progressive schools formed a group called Associated Experimental Schools to raise funds and to refine their progressive philosophy, but the group was abandoned by the end of the 1930s. City and Country School has preserved the archives of this group.

Parents were "an eclectic group of socialists, Quakers, radical Jews, prominent intellectuals and liberal business-people". The curriculum was based on the ideas of John Dewey and Horace Mann. Frances Horwich was head of the school for a few years during World War II, and later became host of the children's television program Ding Dong School. She was followed in 1943 by educator James L. Hymes Jr. Moos, the founder, developed political views that some viewed as too far to the left.

== Architecture ==
The school suffered a fire in 1930. After the fire a new school building was designed by William Lescaze and George Howe. The building was designed in the International Style, and has been called "the most noted early example of modernist school design in America".

The school was the subject of a documentary film by Lee Dick, screened at the 1939 New York World's Fair. The film was apparently the first documentary produced on 16mm with sound and dialogue.

The building is currently used by Temple Israel of Northern Westchester.

== Notable alumni ==
- Mary Esherick, b. 1916. Daughter of Wharton Esherick, artist, who, Instead of fees, paid the school in children's chairs he designed in 1925.
- Ethel Stein, b. 1917, textile artist.
- Heywood Hale Broun, b. 1918, actor and broadcaster.
- Sonia Chase Hodson, b. 1920. Daughter of school founder Margaret Hatfield and Stuart Chase, a prominent social theorist.
- Sheldon R. Coons, Jr, b. 1921. Killed in WWII, son of Sheldon R. Coons, philanthropist.
- Elizabeth Cadbury-Brown, b. 1922, architect.
- Thomas Kuhn, b. 1922, philosopher of science, who introduced the term paradigm shift. He attended the school from sixth through ninth grade, and left the school in 1937.
- James Stevenson, b. 1929, illustrator and author.
- Two sons of artist Fairfield Porter. He corresponded at length with Elizabeth Moos in 1941 about his sons' education.
- Jonathan Talbot, b. 1939, collage artist. He was enrolled in the school in the late 1940s.

Since the school welcomed children only up to about age 15, most children went elsewhere to finish their school education. One alternative progressive school was Scarborough School, only a few miles from Hessian Hills.
