= Ethel Stein =

American textile artist (1917–2018)

- Born: June 22, 1917
- Died: March 9, 2018 (aged 100)
- Known for: Weaving, puppetmaking

Ethel Stein (1917–2018) was an American textile artist who lived in Croton-on-Hudson, N.Y. While her work was primarily in weaving, her best known piece is the puppet Lamb Chop.

== Early life and education ==
Stein was born as Ethel Levy on June 22, 1917, to Tanya Levy in New York City. She was raised by her aunt and Uncle, Ella and Abbo Ostrowsky, in Croton-on-Hudson. Stein attended Hessian Hills school and was taught woodworking by sculptor Wharton and painting by painter/muralist/lithographer George Biddle In the latter half of the 1930s, she worked as an assistant at the Educational Alliance Art School where her uncle, Mr. Ostrowsky, was the director. While working there, Stein learned from sculptor Chaim Gross studying with Louise Nevelson. In the late 1930s Stein moved to Cambridge, Massachusetts where she studied with Josef Albers (husband of the weaver Anni Albers) and others who were associated with the Bauhaus movement. It was here that she met her husband, the architect Richard G. Stein, while he was doing his master's at Harvard. He served in World War II, after which the couple settled in Croton-on-Hudson.

== Career ==
Stein started out as a sculptor. In the 1960s she exhibited as a member of the Vectors artist group in New York City. After meeting Milton Sonday, the curator of textiles at Cooper Hewitt, Smithsonian Design Museum, she became increasingly interested in textiles and studied the museum's collection of textiles. Stein studied historical textile techniques using a microscope to see how the textile was formed and sketching the treads. She used these techniques, along with her knowledge of loom technology, to experiment to create new and different works. Her woven works included geometric abstract works and figurative images, using bright colours, muted colours and monochromatic black/grey/white.

In Ikat, Stein created a technique that combined satin binding pattern with double ikat, such that the resist dyed warp and weft threads created a variation of colour intensity, and the weft-based pattern created a higher contrast than traditional ikat weavings.

As a weaver, Stein's professional circle included textile artists such as Lenore Tawney and Mary Walker Phillips. Even into her 90s, Stein wove everyday in her studio.

=== Puppets ===
Ethel Stein created puppets out of old socks, initially for her son's nursery school, before starting a business of it. She sold the puppets through a Manhattan department store. In 1953, one puppet went to television puppeteer, Shari Lewis, and became known as Lamb Chop. Stein created several puppets for Shari Lewis.

== Death and legacy ==
Ethel Stein died of complications from pneumonia on Friday, March 9, 2018 in Cortlandt, New York at the age of 100. Jack Lenor Larsen, a textile designer and author said of Stein, "Ethel Stein did not shun an audience; rather, she sidestepped the pervasive marketing focus of others." Daniel Walker, of the Art Institute of Chicago, called her a "weaver's weaver".

== Work ==
=== Major exhibitions ===
Ethel Stein exhibited in group shows at major institutions in the United States including Cooper Hewitt, the American Craft Museum in New York, the San Francisco Museum of Modern Art, the Cleveland Museum of Art and the Metropolitan Museum of Art, as well as exhibiting in England, the Netherlands and Switzerland.

In 2014, Ethel Stein had her first solo exhibition at the Art Institute of Chicago at the age of 96.

=== Public collections ===
Cooper-Hewitt
