= Hendrick Hudson Central School District =

School district in the U.S. state of New York

Address
- 61 Trolley Road Montrose, New York, 10567; United States

District information
- Type: Public
- Grades: K–12
- NCES District ID: 3614190

Students and staff
- Students: 2,218 (2020–2021)
- Teachers: 234.0 (on an FTE basis)
- Staff: 249.0 (on an FTE basis)
- Student–teacher ratio: 9.48:1

Other information
- Website: www.henhudschools.org

Hendrick Hudson School District is located in Westchester County, New York and is made up of five schools: three elementary schools, named Buchanan Verplanck, Furnace Woods, and Frank G. Lindsay, and one middle school, named Blue Mountain Middle School, and one high school, named Hendrick Hudson High School.

== Elementary schools ==
- The Buchanan-Verplanck school is located in the village of Buchanan.
- The Frank G. Lindsey school is located in the hamlet of Montrose.
- The Furnace Woods school is located in Cortlandt Manor.

== Blue Mountain Middle School ==
Blue Mountain Middle School is located in Cortlandt Manor.

== Hendrick Hudson High School ==
Hendrick Hudson High School is located in Montrose, New York 10548
