= Mount Airy, New York =

Unincorporated community in New York

Mount Airy, also referred to as Mt. Airy, is a neighborhood situated immediately south of Furnace Woods and north of Croton, and is partially situated in both unincorporated Cortlandt and the village of Croton-on-Hudson in Westchester County, New York, United States.

== Geography ==
The neighborhood is bounded to the west by Furnace Dock Road and the hamlet of Crugers, to the south by Grand St. and the Village of Croton, and to the east by the Croton River. To the north of the neighborhood is mostly undeveloped woods, beyond which lies the Furnace Wood, Cortlandt Manor and the hamlets of Cortlandt and Yorktown.

== Population ==
In the early 1700s, the population on Mt. Airy was predominantly Dutch and English.

Although no official statistics are available (Mt. Airy is not a census-designated place), the demographics of the area are extremely homogenous. It is overwhelmingly white, and mostly upper and upper-middle class. Towards the southern end of the road is low-income housing subsidized by the Village, known as Mt. Airy Woods, but fewer than 30 families reside there. The total population of Mt. Airy is difficult to gauge, but is likely somewhere around 1,500 people.

== Transportation and schools ==
Mt. Airy is situated entirely within the Croton-Harmon School District and the Croton-on-Hudson post office (10520). Unlike the more densely populated neighborhoods of the village proper, the homes on Mt. Airy Road and its tributaries are very spread out, and retain a rural feel that belies its location in the suburbs. The neighborhood is the very definition of a bedroom community, and is almost completely dead during weekdays, when parents are at work in New York City, White Plains, and several other local cities, and children are at school in the Upper Village. Residents along the neighborhood's western end use Route 9's Montrose exit in Crugers to commute to New York, White Plains, Yorktown, the Croton-Harmon train station, the Harmon neighborhood and the village of Croton-on-Hudson. Most other residents travel down South Mt. Airy Rd. to reach these same destinations, while residents along the northeastern edges, by Route 129, use that road to travel into the village and to the Taconic State Parkway in Yorktown, where many travel southwards into White Plains. A rush-hour commuter bus runs along Route 129 to the train station.

== History ==
In the early 20th century, Mt. Airy was known as Red Hill for its importance to the American Communist Party. Many high-ranking members, in addition to several communist actors, lived in the hamlet, and John Reed himself lived in Croton's Upper Village. The highly controversial Peekskill Riot took place less than five miles away, and after this event, the Communist Party's influence slowly withered away as the Cold War escalated. Mt Airy was home to the Hessian Hills School, which was founded by Elizabeth Moos in the 1920s and lasted until the early 1950s.

In 1932, Mount Airy and Harmon, which were then separate communities, were incorporated into the village of Croton-on-Hudson. Each area had a distinct identity that contributed to the cultural richness of the Croton-on-Hudson community. Mount Airy had remained a Quaker enclave into the 1800s but evolved in the early 1900s into a summer colony that attracted many Greenwich Village artists and writers. Writers such as New Thought writer Ralph Waldo Trine, who built a cabin there.
