= Donald S. Zagoria =

American author (1928–2025)

- Born: August 24, 1928
- Died: September 16, 2025 (aged 97); Crugers, New York, U.S.
- Education: Rutgers University (BA); Columbia University (MA, PhD)
- Writing career
- Notable works: The Sino-Soviet Conflict, 1956-1961; Breaking the China-Taiwan Impasse
- Notable awards: Guggenheim Fellowship for Social Sciences, US & Canada

Donald S. Zagoria (August 24, 1928 – September 16, 2025) was an American author and director of the Forum on Asia-Pacific Security.

== Life and career ==
Zagoria was born on August 24, 1928. He earned a B.A. at Rutgers University and received M.A. and Ph.D. degrees at Columbia University.

He worked for the RAND Corporation and taught at Hunter College. Zagoria was a consultant to the National Security Council and the Bureau of East Asian and Pacific Affairs of the State Department when Jimmy Carter was in office. He wrote or edited four books and more than 300 articles on international relations.

Zagoria died in Crugers, New York, on September 16, 2025, at the age of 97.
