= Verplanck's Point =

Point of land in New York, USA

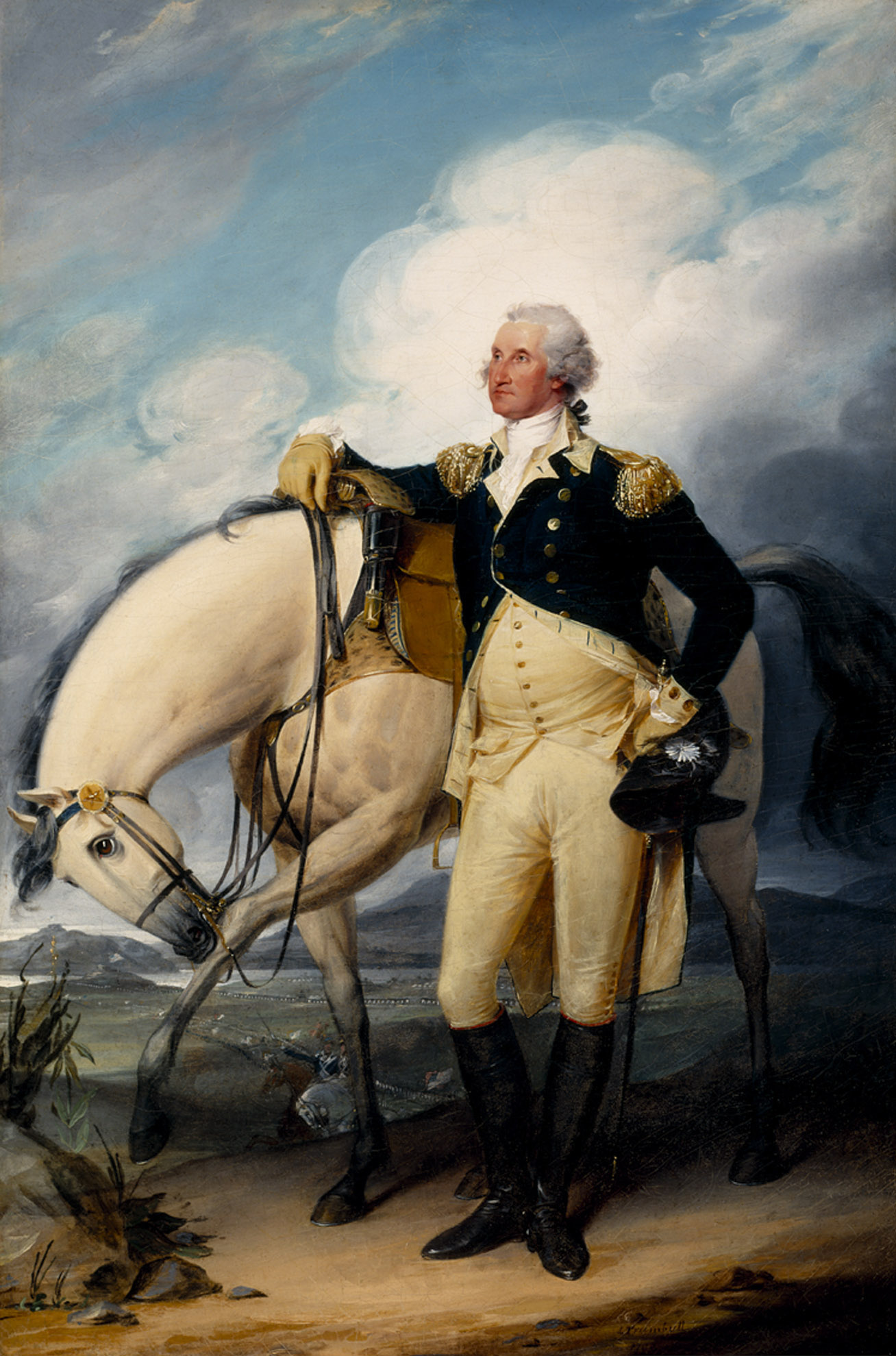
Washington at Verplanck's Point, by John Trumbull (1790)

Verplanck's Point lies at the southernmost end of the hamlet of Verplanck in the town of Cortlandt, New York in the upper northwest corner of Westchester County. Both derive their name from the activities of the Verplanck family, established in New Amsterdam by Abraham Isaacsen Verplanck in the 1630s.

== History ==
Verplanck's Point is best known for its role in the American Revolutionary War, several times serving as an encampment for George Washington's Continental Army during its crossings of the Hudson River. Its flat alluvial plane served as a natural staging area for ferrying men and materiel from King's Ferry, lying between the Point and the neighboring hamlet of Montrose and Stony Point on the west bank of the river.

Pursued by the army of British General William Howe, Washington was en route to Fort Lee, New Jersey. From there the army continued south to Yorktown, Virginia, where Washington received the surrender of General Cornwallis on October 19, 1781.

=== Troop Review ===
A year later, in September 1782, Verplanck's Point, a natural place for an encampment during the inherent bottleneck of an arduous and slow ferrying of men and materiel across the river, again became the site of the Continental Army's bivouac upon crossing the Hudson. On the 14th (Note: There are discrepancies on the date, some citing the day of Rochambeau's arrival, Saturday, September 14, 1782, and others the following Sunday, September 21, with a French review of the Continental troops held on the 20th.) Washington staged a review of Continental Army there as an honor for the departing French commander in chief Comte de Rochambeau and his army.

Washington wrote of the display:

"As the intention of drawing out the troops tomorrow is to compliment his Excellency the Count de Rochambeau; The troops as he passes them shall pay him the honors due the commander in chief," adding with typical attention to detail, "On this occasion the tallest men are to be in the front rank."

== Trumbull painting ==
John Trumbull painted a full-length oil portrait of Washington at Verplanck's Point, and gifted it to Martha Washington. Based on its success he produced a much larger work scaled up to nearly four times its size for the City of New York, George Washington, substituting Evacuation Day of New York City in 1783 as its backdrop for departing French commander-in-chief General Rochambeau's review of Washington's Continental Army troops on September 14, 1782.

== Historical markers and commemorative plaques ==
Historical markers and commemorative plaques in Cortlandt Waterfront Park on Riverview Avenue include "Fort Lafayette" plaque marking the location of the fort captured by the British in 1779, "In Grateful Remembrance" marker dedicated to American and French soldiers who crossed the Hudson River at King’s Ferry in 1781, "Washington at Verplanck’s Point" marker highlighting the 1782 grand encampment of the Continental Army where Washington greeted the French army following the victory at Yorktown, and multiple interpretive signs detailing the events related to the crucial King's Ferry crossing.
