= McAndrews Estate =

Estate in Cortlandt, New York, U.S.

Coordinates: 41°13′35.14″N 73°55′10.23″W

The McAndrews Estate (also known as Reusens Farm or Long View) is part of Oscawana Park, located in the Crugers area of the Town of Cortlandt in northern Westchester County, New York. Once a large working farm and estate, it is now unincorporated park land and contains a number of ruins.

== History ==
=== Reusens Farm era ===
The land was originally owned by Nicholas Cruger, and later by a group of individuals including R.A. Wilkinson, Catherine and Gilbert R. Fox, Henry DeGraaf, Warren Leslie, and several others. By the 1880s it had been acquired piece by piece by Guillaume A. Reusens, a businessman of Belgian ancestry who bred racehorses.

According to a 1912 testimony in Westchester County Supreme Court in the case of N.Y Central & Hudson River Railroad vs. Guillaume A. Reusens (and others), Reusens and his surveyor detailed a sizable number of structures on the property including:

- A large uninhabited old colonial house
- A two-story and attic frame "Fox House"
- A two-story and attic frame "Powers House" north of Hillside Avenue
- A one-story and attic stable with a coachman's house attached
- A one-story frame building behind the cow stable
- A racetrack with a judge's stand
- A brick reservoir north of the track
- A stable north of Hillside Avenue
- An ice house
- Small sundry buildings

=== Long View era ===
Following the death of Guillaume Reusens on January 5, 1915, the property was inherited by his nephews, brothers Stanislaus P.M. C. and Eugene DeRidder. Starting in 1902, Stansilaus was the Belgian consul and resided in Louisville, Kentucky. Eugene died shortly thereafter in 1916. His death resulted in a dispute in which his common-law wife, Mrs. Eloise Walter of The Hague, claimed to have a will giving her three-fourths of the estate. Eventually Stansilaus secured sole ownership of the property, which by that time was known as Long View.

After the death of Stanislaus DeRidder on March 7, 1934, his widow Anne married Martin McAndrews. The couple maintained the property as a working farm. Anne McAndrews died on September 20, 1948. Martin McAndrews moved away sometime thereafter, and the property fell into serious disrepair.The property was vandalized and burned. Martin was in Vietnam. Addendum from P McAndrew Heir.

By 1965 Westchester County moved to condemn the property, which it did four years later in 1969. Not long after, under the County's Orders, the deteriorating structures on the property were demolished. The property and many of the buildings on it were filmed shortly before and after the demolition by local resident Frederic Cole. The footage was compiled into a short film called "The End of Long View".

=== Research and restoration ===
In April 2011 a Facebook group called "Historic McAndrews Estate" was formed to research and explore the possibility of restoring or cleaning up the property. The group contains links to historical photographs, documents and the demolition videos.
