= John Jones Homestead =

Historic house in New York, United States

- U.S. National Register of Historic Places
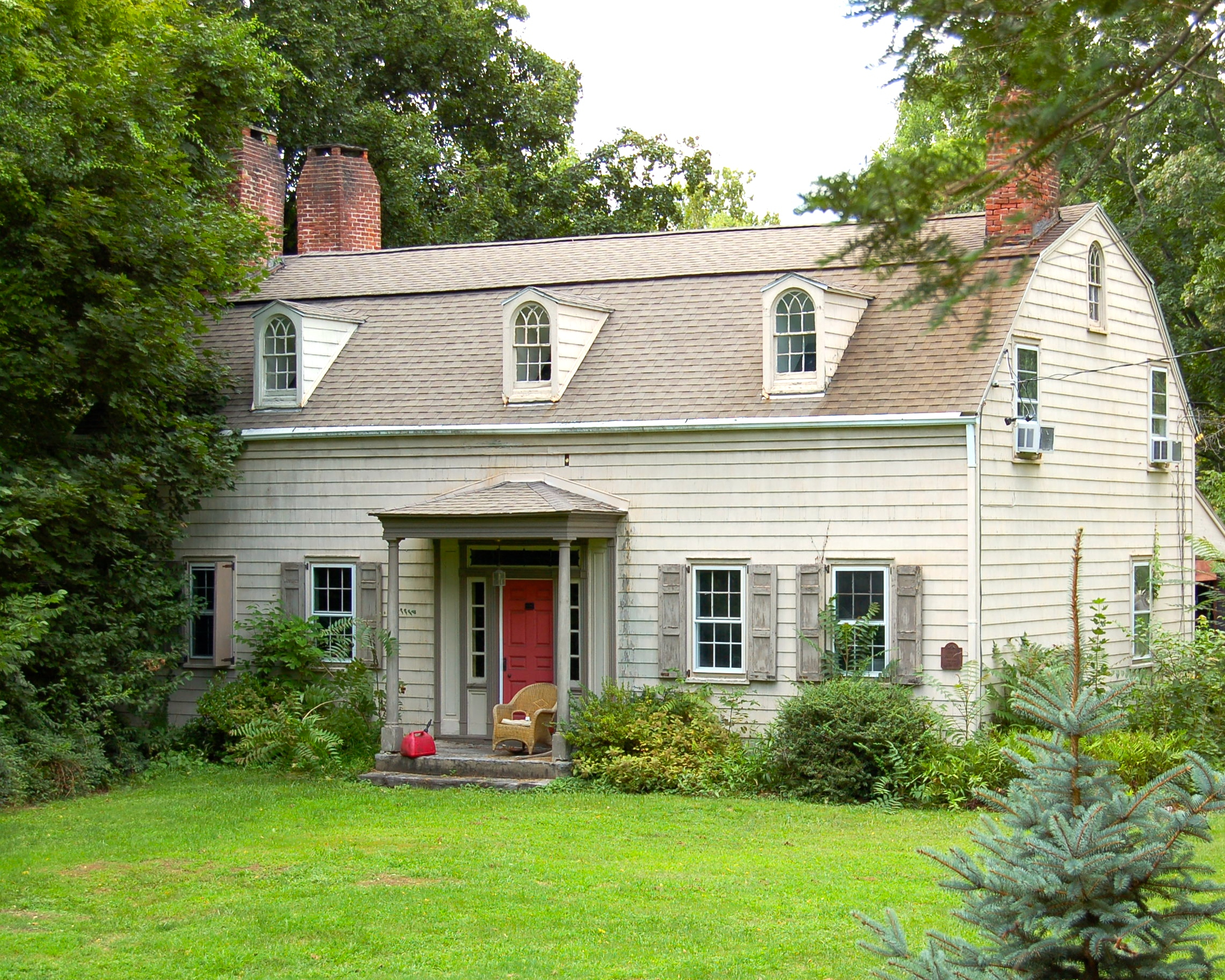

- Location within New York Location within the United States
- Location: Oregon Rd. and Durrin Ave., Van Cortlandtville, New York
- Coordinates: 41°18′58″N 73°54′0″W
- Area: 2.5 acres (1.0 ha)
- Architectural style: Federal
- NRHP reference No.: 89000462
- Added to NRHP: May 25, 1989

John Jones Homestead is a historic home located at Van Cortlandtville, Westchester County, New York. It is a large, 1 1/2-story, 18th-century residence with Federal-style detailing. The five-bay, timber-frame dwelling sits on a massive rubble stone foundation. It has a gambrel roof with three dormers and pierced by three massive stone chimneys. A 1-story rectangular wing is sheathed in clapboard. Also on the property is a contributing small barn.

It was added to the National Register of Historic Places in 1989.

== See also ==
- National Register of Historic Places listings in northern Westchester County, New York
