= Durland Scout Reservation =

Boy Scout camp

Agatha A. Durland Scout Reservation
- Owner: Greater Hudson Valley Council
- Location: Putnam Valley, New York
- Country: United States
- Coordinates: 41°24′56″N 73°50′23″W
- Founded: 1968
- Website www.ghvbsa.org/durland

The Agatha A. Durland Scout Reservation is a Scout camp owned by the Greater Hudson Valley Council. It is 1,400 acres (5.7 km^{2}) of mostly deciduous forest containing five lakes, bordered by Clarence Fahnestock State Park to the northeast. It has about forty campsites and nine cabins.

In the summer months, it is used as one of three Greater Hudson Valley Council Cub Scout camps.

== History ==
In 1968, environmentalist and National Geographic Director of Exploration William O. Field sold his 1,400-acre (5.7 km^{2}) property to the Boy Scouts of America. The camp was originally named Clear Lake Scout Reservation for one of the lakes on the property. The New York State Office of Parks, Recreation and Historic Preservation offered to buy the land from Field to add on to the newly formed and neighboring Clarence Fahnestock State Park, but Field declined, claiming that the BSA would be better caretakers of the land, keeping it "forever wild". The estate was sold to the council in 1968.

In 1993, the Westchester-Putnam Council, a precursor to the Greater Hudson Valley Council, received a $2.1 million dollar grant from the Open Space Institute that prevented the property from being sold to private developers and turned into a golf course.

In 2007, the council renamed Clear Lake to the Agatha A. Durland Scout Reservation. The reservation's namesake had donated her Long Island Sound bayfront mansion in Rye, New York on Milton Point, to the council and a 20-year trust to the council. In 2007, the waterfront property, Durland Scout Center, was sold to private developers. Durland's will required that if the property were to be sold, it would be used to establish a new or similar Camp Durland elsewhere, resulting in an investment into Clear Lake, and its name being changed.

== The reservation ==
The reservation encompasses 1,400 acres of deciduous forest and two large lakes, marshes and three smaller ponds.

Three large cabins and six smaller cabins are available for rental by Boy Scout Troops. Additionally, around 30 campsites are available for short-term camping, including two sites that have lean-tos, and several sites that are not accessible by car.

The camp is maintained year-round by the ranger who lives on the property assisted by campmasters who assist on a weekend basis.

== See also ==
- Westchester-Putnam Council, the council that managed the reservation before merging into the Greater Hudson Valley Council
- Scouting in New York
