= Van Cortlandtville School =

- U.S. National Register of Historic Places
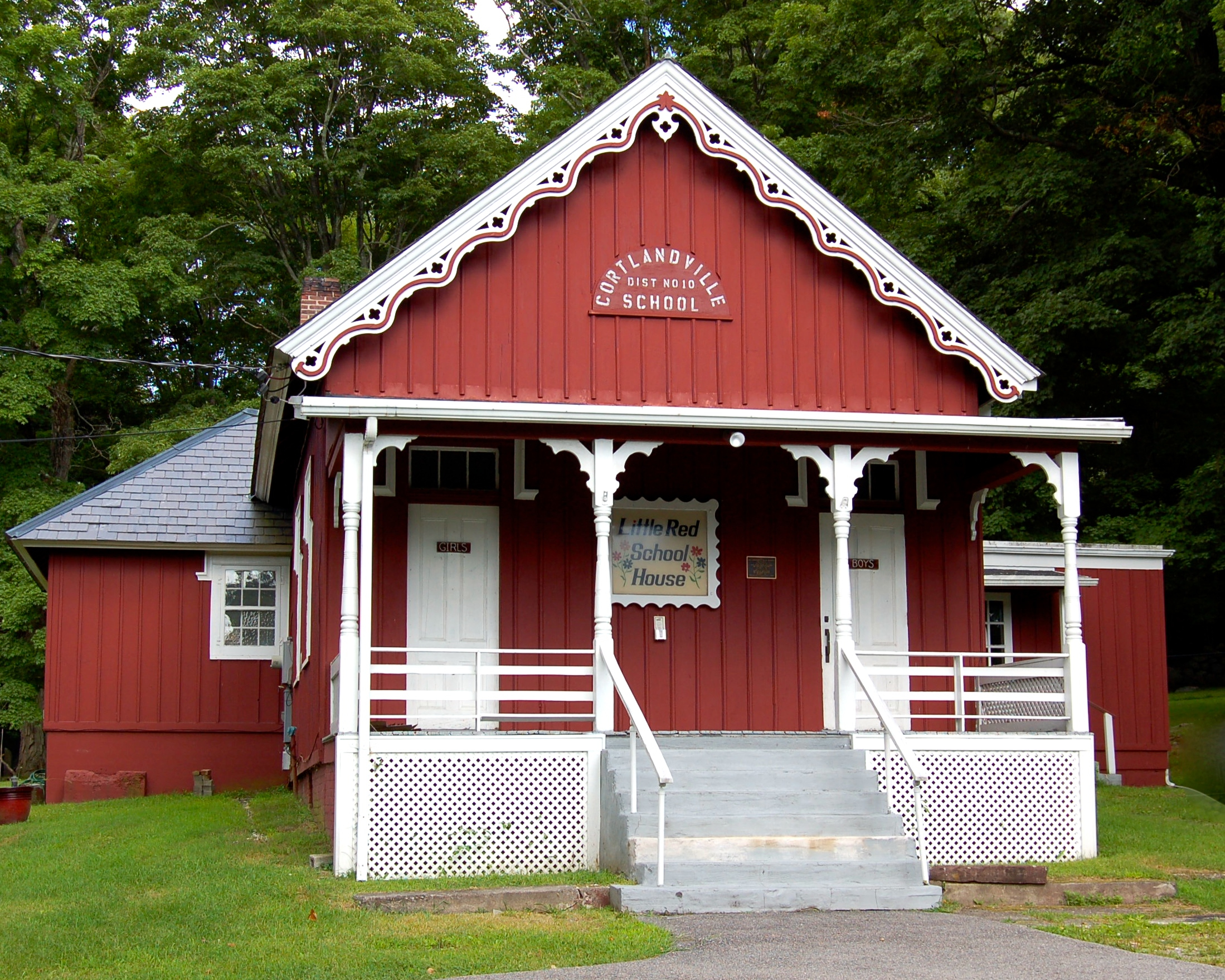

- Location within New York Location within the United States
- Location: 297 Locust Ave., Van Cortlandtville, New York
- Coordinates: 41°18′45″N 73°54′1″W
- Area: 1 acre (0.40 ha)
- Built: c. 1850
- Architectural style: Gothic Revival
- NRHP reference No.: 89000285
- Added to NRHP: April 7, 1989

Van Cortlandtville School, also known as Common School District No. 10, is a historic school building located in Van Cortlandtville—a historic neighborhood of the town of Cortlandt, Westchester County, New York. It was built about 1850 and is a small, one story, brick vernacular Gothic Revival style building. It has a steeply pitched, slate covered gable roof and board and batten siding. Additions were made to the original building in the early 20th century and in 1940. The building serves as headquarters of the Van Cortlandtville Historical Society.

It was added to the National Register of Historic Places in 1989.

== See also ==
- National Register of Historic Places listings in northern Westchester County, New York
