= George Washington (Trumbull, 1790) =

1790 painting by John Trumbull

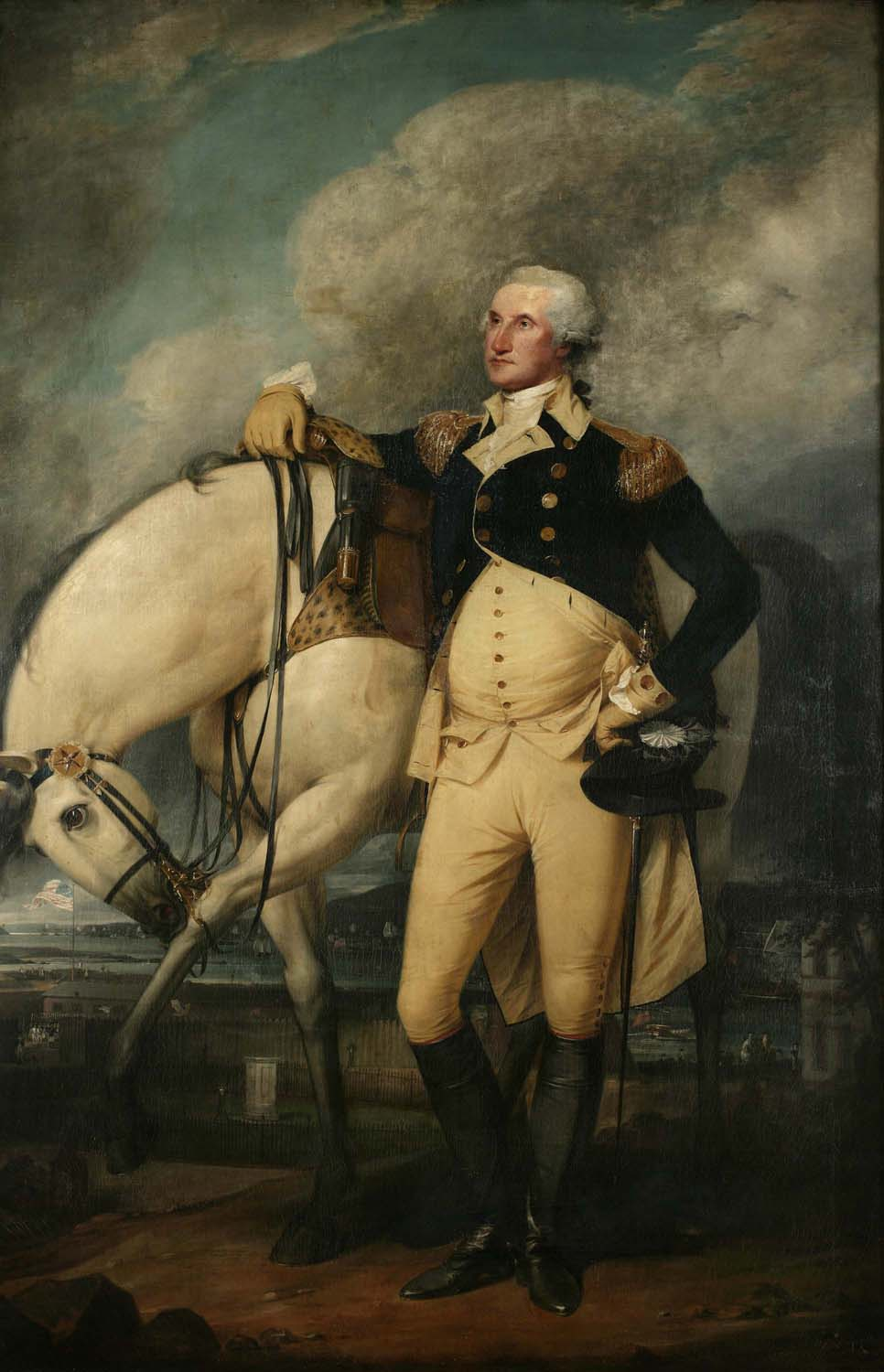
- Artist: John Trumbull
- Year: 1790
- Medium: oil on canvas
- Dimensions: 270 cm × 180 cm (108 in × 72 in)
- Location: New York City Hall

George Washington (also known as Washington and the Departure of the British Garrison from New York City) is a large full-length oil painting by American artist John Trumbull in 1790.

Trumbull's earlier 1790 work, Washington at Verplanck's Point, which he had gifted to Washington's wife Martha, had been very well received. In consequence, Trumbull received a July, 1790, commission from the corporation for the City of New York, led by Mayor Richard Varick, to paint the president's portrait.

Rather than beginning anew, Trumbull enormously scaled up the prior work, enlarging it from roughly 30" by 20" to nearly four times the size, 108" by 72". In composition and general character the two paintings are substantially the same, with only the middle background as seen through Washington's horse's legs changed, from a September 14, 1782 review of Continental Army troops he had staged for departing French commander-in-chief General Rochambeau to an idealized vision of Evacuation Day, Washington's return to New York City upon the British departure on November 25, 1783.

This painting is located in the historic Governor's Room of New York City Hall.

== Background ==
Trumbull in a letter to his mentor, the painter Benjamin West, on August 30, 1790, wrote:

I have several small portraits of the President ... one in particular which I have done for Mrs. Washington a full length about 20 Inches hight ... is thought very like—& I have Been tempted to disobey one of your injunctions & to attempt a large Portrait of him for this City which I am now finishing—the figure is near seven feet high compos'd with a Horse, & the back ground the evacuation of this Place by the British at the Peace:—the Harbour & Fleet with a Part of the fortifications & Ruins of the Town:—How I have succeeded I hardly dare judge:—the World have approved the resemblance, it is to Hang in the most elegant Room in America & in a very perfect light.

— John Trumbull

== Composition ==
The pose and general composition are virtual of copies of Washington at Verplanck's Point painted earlier in 1790, but instead of the background seen through the horse's legs being a romanticized depiction of a review of Continental Army troops at their encampment at New York's Verplanck's Point (Note: Part of the town of Cortlandt, New York, some 25 miles north of the Harlem River and northernmost New York City.) Washington had staged for departing French commander-in-chief General Rochambeau on September 14, 1782, (Note: There are discrepancies on the date, some citing the day of Rochambeau's arrival, Saturday, September 14, 1782, and others the following Sunday, September 21, with a French review of the Continental troops held on the 20st.) it is an idealized vision of Evacuation Day, Washington's return to New York City upon the British departure on November 25, 1783. It was put on display in the Governor's Room of New York City Hall, where it remains.

== Engraving ==
In 1899, Samuel Arlent Edwards engraved a version entitled Washington and noted as "From the painting by J. Trumbull in the City Hall, New York".

== See also ==
- General George Washington at Trenton – full-length portrait painted in 1792 by Trumbull
- List of paintings of George Washington
