= Hendrick Hudson High School =

Public high school in Montrose, NY, US

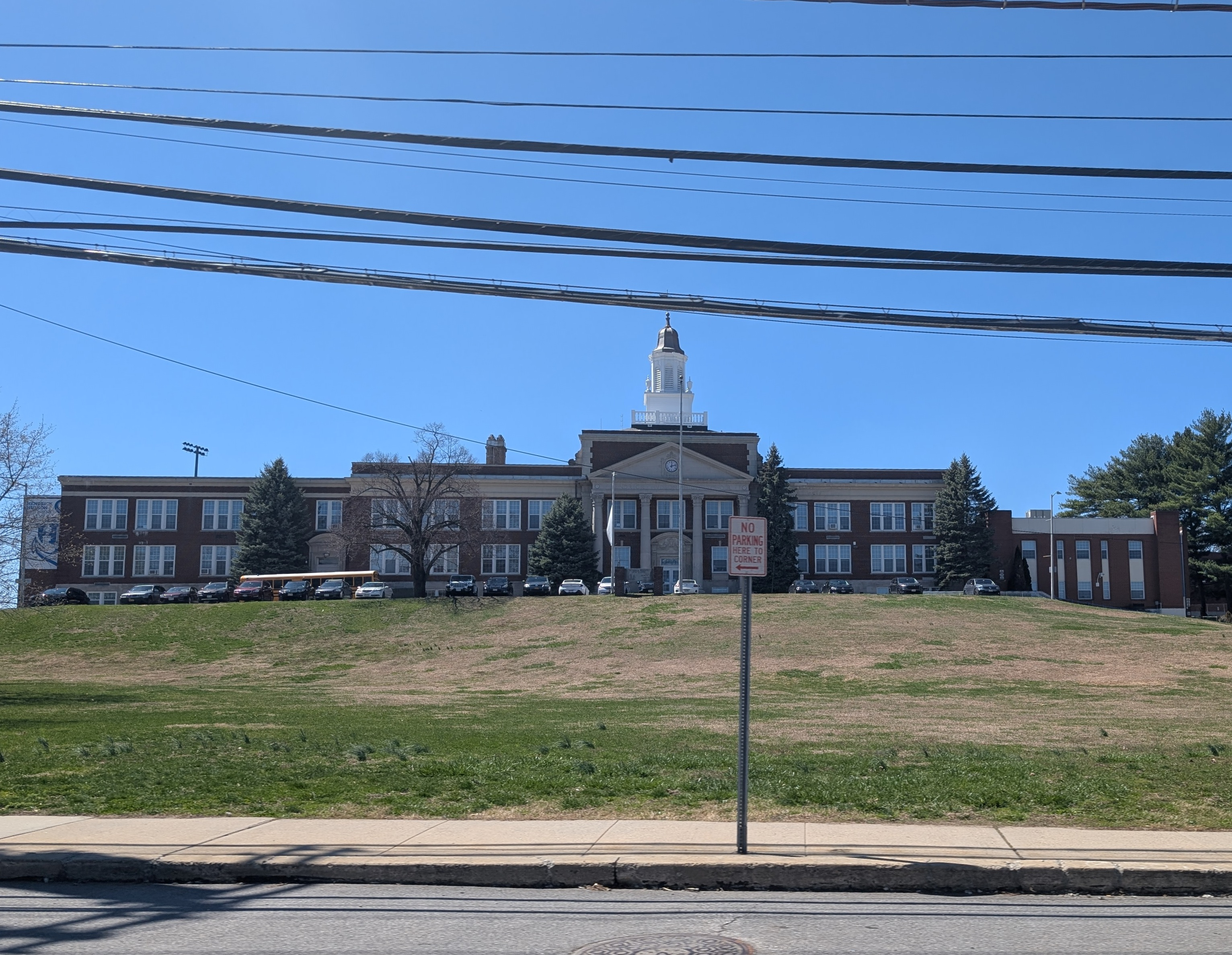

Location
- 2166 Albany Post Road; Montrose, New York; United States

Information
- Type: Public, secondary
- School district: Hendrick Hudson School District
- Teaching staff: 77 (FTE)
- Grades: 9–12
- Gender: Co-educational
- Enrollment: 725 (2021–22)
- Student to teacher ratio: 9.42
- Colors: Blue and white
- Athletics: Section 1 (NYSPHSAA)
- Mascot: Big Henry
- Nickname: Sailors
- Rival: Croton-Harmon High School
- Website: hhhs.henhudschools.org

Hendrick Hudson High School is a public high school in Montrose, New York, United States.

It is the sole comprehensive high school in the Hendrick Hudson Central School District, which is within the Town of Cortlandt. Villages in the district include Buchanan and a section of Croton-on-Hudson. Census-designated places include Crugers, Montrose, and Verplanck. It also includes the hamlet of Cortlandt Manor.

During the 2021–22 school year, there were 725 students enrolled at Hendrick Hudson, averaging about 180 students per grade.

== Administration ==
The principal of Hendrick Hudson is Mrs. Lauren Scollins. The assistant principals are Mr. Nick Katsaris and Mrs. Maria Pearson.

== Academics ==
In the 2007–2008 school year, Hendrick Hudson High School offered 50 sections of 12 Advanced Placement courses in eight different subject areas. It also began offering a three-year science research course sequence to tenth graders through the State University of New York at Albany in the High School program. There are two college level language classes offered through Syracuse University Project Advance (SUPA), in Italian and French.

In 2010, Hendrick Hudson High School introduced a new four-year engineering program through Project Lead the Way (PLTW). Since the 2011–2012 school year, a second four-year Project Lead the Way program has been offered in the biomedical sciences.

== Arts ==
=== Chorus ===
The choral program comprises three choruses:

- Concert Choir, an SATB group open to all Hen Hud students
- Hen Hud Harmonizers, an audition-based SATB group
- Treble Makers, an audition-based women's treble chorus

The Treble Makers won Best Overall Choir and Best Women's Chorus at the Music in the Parks festival in May 2007, 2008, 2009, 2010, 2011, and 2015. The Treble Chorus was invited to sing at the celebration in May 2009 commemorating the Aaron Copland House (which is located within the Hen Hud district) as a National Historic Landmark. The Treble Makers have recently been collaborating with British rock violinist Daisy Jopling, having performed with her and her band at the Paramount Center for the Arts in Peekskill, New York, as well as the Peter Norton Symphony Space in Manhattan.

At the 2010 NYSSMA Majors Festival, both the Treble Makers and a select group from the Concert Choir achieved Gold with Distinction ratings on their performances.

=== Drama ===
In 2010 the Hendrick Hudson Starboard Stars Drama Club was nominated for six Metro Awards and won for Outstanding Orchestra.

=== Band ===
In 2005, 2007, and 2009, the Hendrick Hudson Wind Ensemble scored a Gold Rating in the annual NYSSMA Majors Festival under the direction of Joe Stamboni.

== Sports ==
In 2006, the Hendrick Hudson varsity volleyball team won the Class A New York State championship. The team won the 2007 and 2008 Class B state championships. In 2009, the volleyball team went to the State Tournament for the fifth consecutive year, and lost in the finals. In 2026, Sophia Savatgy won 2 state championship titles in the 100 meter and 200 meter dash and got 3rd place in the 400 meter.

== Honors and awards ==
The choral department has sent student musicians to the NYSSMA All-State Convention in Rochester, New York, where they have participated in either the Mixed or Women's Chorus. In 2009, three students were selected; in 2010, one student; and in 2011, three students. All were members of the award-winning Treble Makers.

The Hendrick Hudson Speech and Debate team hosts the annual Malcolm A. Bump Memorial Tournament, one of the largest debate tournaments in New York State. In 2005, the team was rated 13th overall in the country.

== Notable alumni ==
- Ali Benjamin - author
- Evan Handler - actor
- Tiffany D. Jackson - author
- Andrew Jenks (class of 2004) - movie producer and director
- Marc Meyers - writer, director, producer
- Katie Jacobs Stanton (class of 1987) - former CMO of Color Genomics, former Head of International Strategy at Twitter; Forbes' 56th most powerful woman in the world in 2011
- Cynthia Wade - Filmmaker and 2008 Oscar winner for Freeheld
