= Read Weber =

- Born: 1908; Wilmette, Illinois, US
- Died: 5 May 1990 (aged 83); Santa Fe, New Mexico, US
- Occupation: Architect
- Partner: Louise Dees-Porch

Read Weber, also called Elizabeth (Read) Weber, was a founding principal of the architectural firm of Katz Waisman Blumenkranz Stein & Weber started and located in Manhattan, New York.

== Early life and education ==
Weber was born in Wilmette, Illinois in 1908 where she grew up. Weber attended the University of Illinois, Art Institute of Chicago in the early 1920's where she studied art. After graduating, she apprenticed with architect Charles Morgan in the mid 1920's for 6 years. While working at Morgan's studio she met Louis Sullivan and Frank Lloyd Wright.

== Career ==
During her time at Morgan's studio she worked on Wright's National Life Insurance Company Building project. In 1931, during the Great Depression, she left her apprenticeship with Charles Morgan to study under Frank Lloyd Wright who invited her to fix one of the buildings at the Taliesin (Studio) in Spring Green, Wisconsin before the arrival of apprentices. She became a member of the first Taliesin fellowship in 1932. The first Taliesin fellowship was composed for 50-60 young apprentices whom did not attend formal class, but rather learned from Wright by helping to build elements on the estate while listening to the architect explain his ideas. Three years later, she partnered with fellow apprentice Louise Dees-Porch to design vacation houses in South Carolina. Her partnership with Louise Dees-Porch lasted until 1939 when in efforts to win World War 2, she left to help a naval architect. In 1946, Weber joined architectural couple Sidney and Taina Waisman Katz and their associates to create their own architectural firm by the name of Katz Waisman & Weber where Weber acted as Design Principal. Shortly after the firm expanded and was renamed to include Katz, Waisman, Blumenkranza, Stein & Weber. The architectural firm specialized in hospitals, health facilities, and educational buildings across the states of New York, Rhone Island, Florida, Pennsylvania, and North Carolina throughout the 1960's. In 1981, at the age of 71, she was awarded a fellowship from the American Institute of Architects, also known as the AIA, for her contribution to the advancement of women in the field of architecture. However, until 2008, 18 years after her death, the American Institute of Architects Membership Role listed her as a man. At the time of her death, her and her partner, Louise Dees-Porche were working on the design and construction of her residence in Cerillos, New Mexico.

== Architectural projects ==
1965 Community Health Center Building at Brookdale Hospital Medical Center, Brooklyn, New York

"New" Building at Bellevue Hospital, New York, New York

Albert mazer Residential Hall at Albert Einstein College of Medicine, Bronx, New York

1957 Coney Island Hospital, Brooklyn, New York

1958 Edward Blum School, Brooklyn New York

1968-1971 Administration Building, College/ Center Hall, and Library at Kingsborough Community College, Brooklyn, New York

McLean Home, Simsbury, Connecticut

== Awards and honors ==
1932-1935 Taliesin fellow

1981 Awarded Fellow of the American Institute of Architects
