= Montrose, New York =

- Census-designated place & hamlet
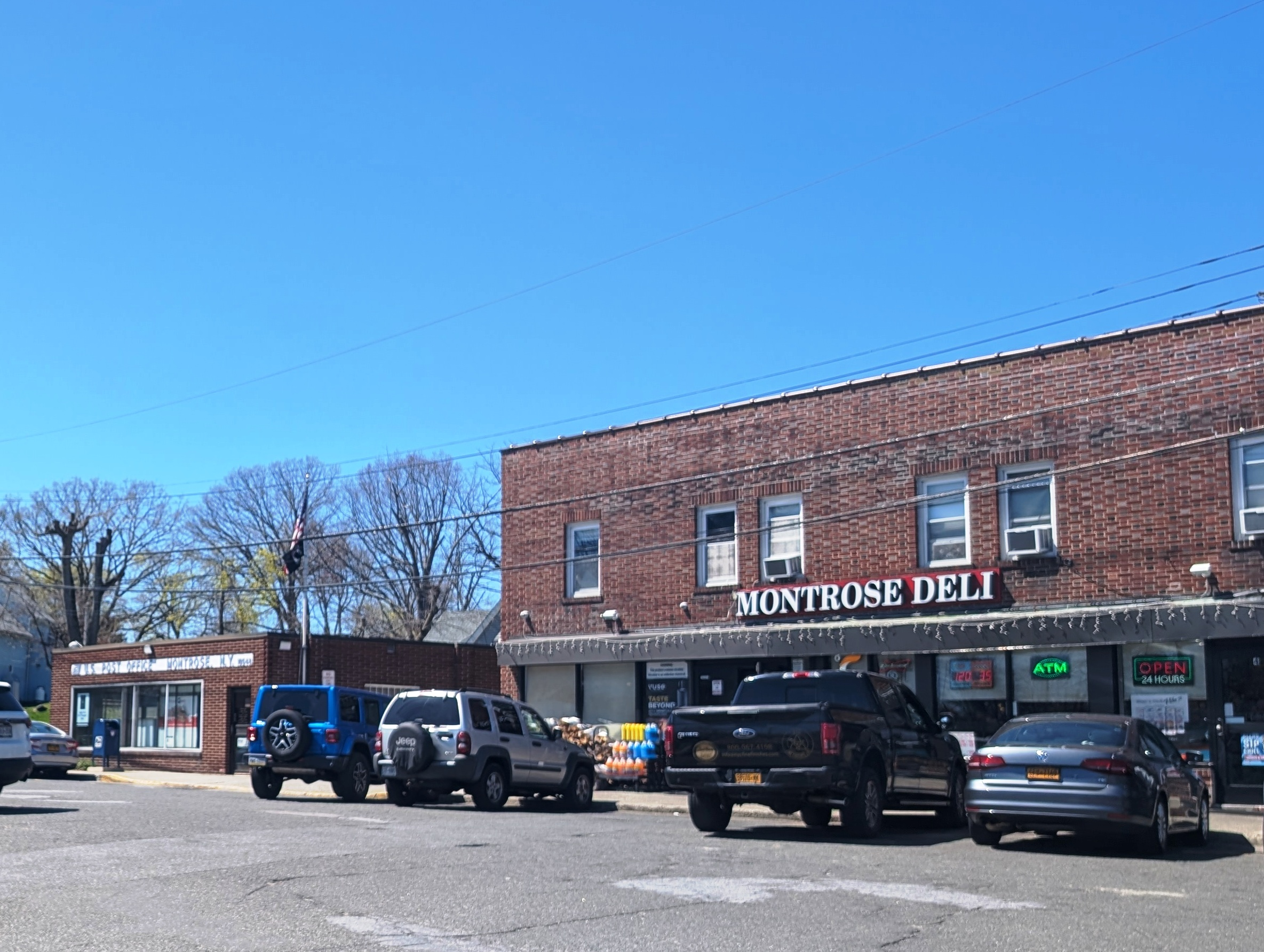
- Montrose Deli and post office

- Location of Montrose, New York
- Coordinates: 41°15′8″N 73°55′54″W
- Country: United States
- State: New York
- County: Westchester
- Town: Cortlandt

Area
  - Total: 2.46 sq mi (6.36 km^{2})
  - Land: 1.62 sq mi (4.20 km^{2})
  - Water: 0.83 sq mi (2.16 km^{2})
- Elevation: 118 ft (36 m)

Population (2020)
  - Total: 2,862
  - Density: 1,766.3/sq mi (681.96/km^{2})
- Time zone: UTC−5 (Eastern (EST))
  - Summer (DST): UTC−4 (Eastern (EST))
- ZIP Code: 10548
- Area code: 914
- FIPS code: 36-48208
- GNIS feature ID: 0957565

Montrose is a hamlet (and census-designated place) within the town of Cortlandt, in the northwestern corner of Westchester County, New York, United States. The hamlet is named after the Montross family, most of whom worked nearby in Buchanan at the tannery. It is located near Croton-on-Hudson and Buchanan. The once bucolic character of the hamlet has changed, but is still defined by the Hudson River, numerous wooded hills and steep slopes, wetland areas and streams, while increases in population have designated the area part of the New York—Jersey City—Newark NY—NJ urban area. As of the 2020 census, Montrose had a population of 2,862.

== Demographics ==
Historical population
Census	Pop.	Note	%±
2020	2,862		—
U.S. Decennial Census

=== 2020 census ===
As of the 2020 census, Montrose had a population of 2,862. The median age was 44.6 years. 20.2% of residents were under the age of 18 and 17.5% of residents were 65 years of age or older. For every 100 females there were 97.9 males, and for every 100 females age 18 and over there were 95.2 males age 18 and over.

100.0% of residents lived in urban areas, while 0.0% lived in rural areas.

There were 1,066 households in Montrose, of which 31.9% had children under the age of 18 living in them. Of all households, 53.0% were married-couple households, 17.0% were households with a male householder and no spouse or partner present, and 23.9% were households with a female householder and no spouse or partner present. About 21.7% of all households were made up of individuals and 10.7% had someone living alone who was 65 years of age or older.

There were 1,125 housing units, of which 5.2% were vacant. The homeowner vacancy rate was 0.7% and the rental vacancy rate was 6.3%.

2020 Montrose CDP Census Data
Race or Ethnicity	Count in Montrose	Count in New York
American Indian and Alaska Native	5	149,690
Asian	92	1,933,127
Black or African American	136	2,986,172
Hispanic or Latino	619	3,948,032
Native Hawaiian or other Pacific Islander	0	10,815
Not Hispanic or Latino	1,901	10,598,907
Some Other Race	254	2,210,633
Two or More Races	330	1,767,463
White	2,045	11,143,349

=== Demographic estimates ===
Further data estimates 1,219 families in Montrose. The largest age cohort was residents between 20 and 24 years of age. Of the population, 24.2% were estimated to be of Italian descent, followed by residents reporting Italian ancestry at 17%, and German ancestry at 8%. Roughly half as many households speak a language other than English at home compared to the rest of the state.

=== Income and Poverty ===
The median household income in 2022 was $121,367, compared to the overall New York state median income of $82,095 and the employment rate was 63.4%. The average poverty rate was lower in Montrose during 2022, at 9.8%, which is 4.4% lower than the state average of 14.2%, while people aged 18 to 64 experienced the highest rate of poverty at 10.8%.

=== Education ===
Montrose residents have an overall higher rate of post-secondary education, as 52.2% of the eligible population have a bachelor's degree or higher. Beyond an undergraduate degree, 19.9% have a post-graduate education.

== Government ==
Montrose lacks its own local government and is instead situated under the government of the Town of Cortlandt. The Town Supervisor is Richard H. Becker and on the Town Board are James F. Creighton, Cristin Jacoby, Robert E. Mayes, and Joyce C. White. Departments include Environmental Services, Planning and Community Development, Technical Services, Human Resources, the Justice Court, the office of the Town Attorney, Police Services, Purchasing, Recreation and Conservation, the Tax Receiver, the Town Assessor, the Town Clerk, the Town Comptroller, the Town Supervisor and all associated divisions.

== Education ==
Montrose is in the Hendrick Hudson School District (HHSD). In Montrose there are two schools, Hendrick Hudson High School, opened 1928, and Frank G. Lindsey Elementary School. Other schools in the HHSD, located outside of Montrose, are Blue Mountain Middle School, Buchanan-Verplanck Elementary School, and Furnace Woods Elementary School. The Hendrick Hudson Free Library is located at 185 Kings Ferry Road in Montrose and covers the communities of Buchanan, Verplanck, Crugers, Montrose, and parts of Cortlandt Manor, Croton-on-Hudson, and the city of Peekskill. It has six on-line computers with ready access to a variety of databases and the internet. The Community Room seats 100 people and serves as a gallery space for art exhibits.

== Infrastructure ==
The Montrose Fire Department, also known as the Cortlandt Engine Company or the Montrose Fire District, is located at 2143 Albany Post Road. The parcel on which the fire station sits was purchased from O. B. Lent in 1920 for $800 and construction began shortly thereafter. The fire district covers approximately twelve square miles and includes twelve pieces of equipment at the single station. It is an all-volunteer company and responded to an average of twenty-two calls per month in 2020. There is a United States Postal Services office located at 13 Kings Ferry Road. Across the street, the Cortlandt Community Volunteer Ambulance Corps can be found.

=== Montrose Improvement District ===
Montrose's water is provided by a local independent water company, the Montrose Improvement District, which was created by residents in 1932 and purchases water from New York City's Catskill Aqueduct to sell to Peekskill, Cortlandt and to Montrose residents. From 2014 to 2019, no instances of MBTE were detected in samples purchased from the Northern Westchester Joint Water Works, which manages two treatment plants servicing Catskill Aqueduct water and Amawalk Reservoir water before it is provided to the Montrose Improvement District.

== Features ==
The town is home to the Franklin D. Roosevelt campus of the Hudson Valley Veterans Affairs healthcare system, whose sprawling campus contains 50 brick buildings. The Hendrick Hudson Free Library was opened in 1931 on the site of the former Kennedy House. George's Island Park is a 208-acre (0.84 km^{2}) waterfront park that offers scenery of the Hudson River. It contains tidal wetlands, a freshwater pond and wooded trails, and provides boat access to the Hudson River as well as areas for nature study and picnicking. The park was acquired by Westchester County in 1966, after the Gormley Brick Company, which supplied bricks for nearby Sing Sing prison, vacated the site. Sunset Field and Seabolt Field/Playground are the main recreational parks for baseball and football. The Cortlandt station on the Hudson Metro-North Railroad's line is located within the town's borders. Kings Ferry, a crucial river crossing site during the Revolutionary War was originally located in Montrose, serving as the southernmost crossing point for the Continental Army, but was later moved to Fort Lafayette.

== Notable people ==
- Frederick W. Seward, Assistant U.S. Secretary of State during the Civil War
- Frederick Paul Keppel, President of the Carnegie Corporation of New York, 1922–1941 to 1942 Ken Mahoney Tony and Emmy winner
