= Richard G. Stein =

Richard G. Stein (1916-1990) was an American architect.

== Biography ==
Stein was born in Chicago in 1916. He attended the New York University and Harvard University to study architecture. During the World War II, he served in the United States Army Corps of Engineers. He was married to Ethel, and they had a son, Carl.

His architectural work was surrounded by designs that conserve energy use. He found out that with a careful use of building materials and design, one can decrease energy use by 20 percent. In 1977, he published a book, Architecture and Energy, on this subject.

Between 1946 and 1960, Stein joined the founding principals, Read Weber, Sidney Waisman Katz, and Taina Waisman Katz, of architectural firm Katz Waisman & Weber expanding the firm to Katz Waisman Blumenkranz Stein Weber, Architects Associated. He founded his firm, the Stein Partnership, in 1961.

Stein was a fellow of the American Institute of Architects. He died in 1990 in Tarrytown, New York at the age of 73.

== Bibliography ==
- Architecture and Energy (1977)
- Handbook of Energy Use for Building Construction (1980)
