= Henry Norman Hudson =

American Shakespeare scholar (1814–1886)

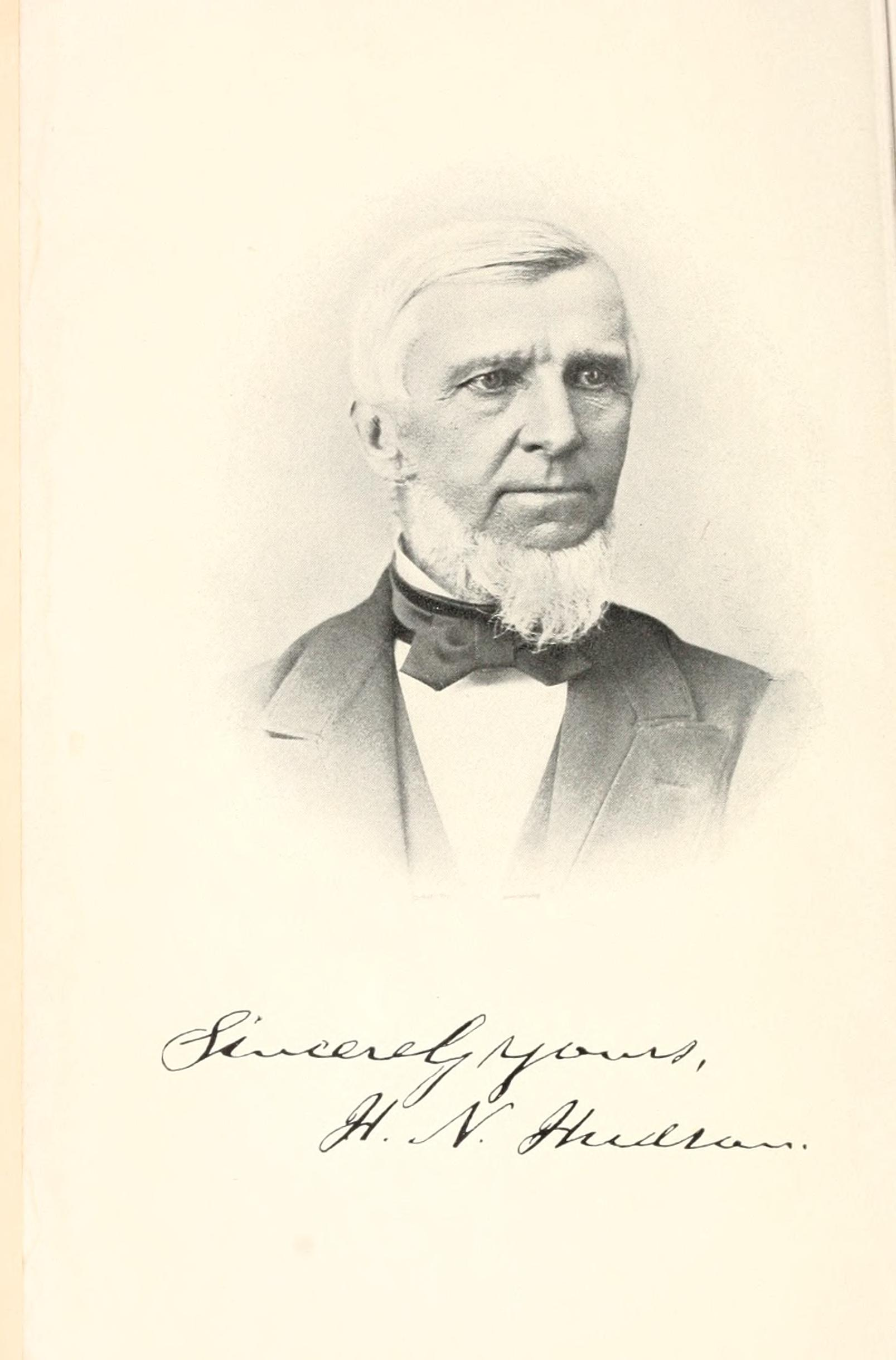
- Born: Henry Norman Hudson; January 28, 1814; Cornwall, Vermont
- Died: January 16, 1886 (aged 71); Cambridge, Massachusetts
- Citizenship: United States
- Occupations: Clergyman and scholar
- Years active: 1844–1881
- Works: Lectures on Shakespeare (1848); the Harvard Shakespeare (1881)
- Spouse: Emily Sarah Bright (m. 1852)
- Children: Henry B. Hudson; William C. Hudson (d. June 1864)

Signature
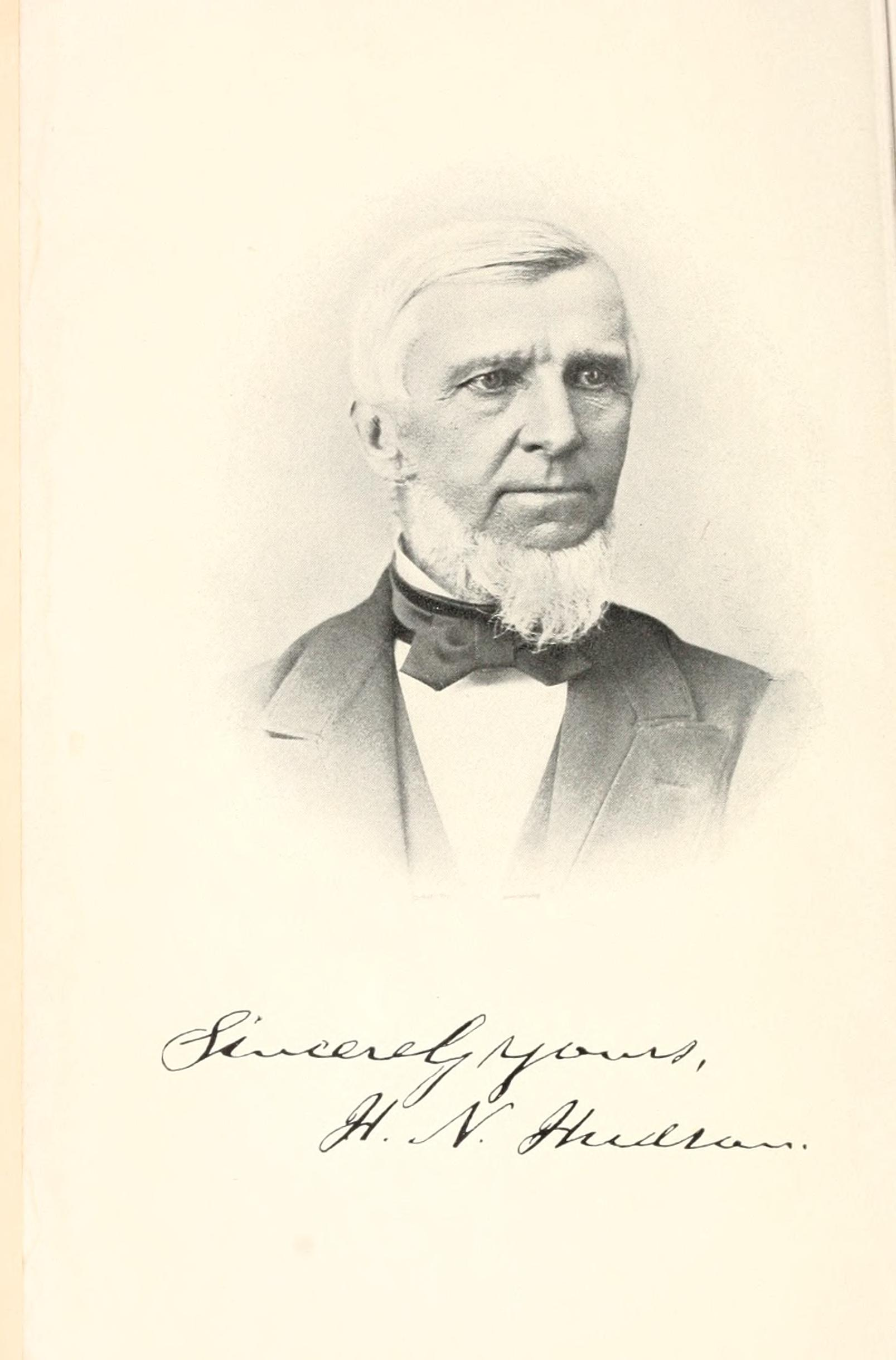

Henry Norman Hudson (January 28, 1814 – January 16, 1886) was an American Shakespeare scholar, notable for annotating many of Shakespeare's plays. His notes, in the form of the "New Hudson Shakespeare," are still in print as of 2025.

== Life ==
Hudson was born in Cornwall, Vermont, on January 28, 1814, the son of a farmer. At the age of eighteen he was apprenticed to a coach-maker. In 1836, at the age of twenty-two, he entered Middlebury College, whence he graduated in the class of 1840. According to Middlebury College lore, he was wont to walk to and from class with his shoes in his hand, in order to save on shoe-leather.

There are conflicting accounts of at what age he discovered Shakespeare. According to the likeliest account, he was fond of Shakespeare from his undergraduate years or even earlier, and spent his post-graduation years 1840–1844 lecturing on Shakespeare in Kentucky and Huntsville, Alabama. Appletons' Cyclopædia retails the certainly apocryphal story that it was only in those years that

he met a lady, also a teacher, whom he had known in New England. In their conversations, he said she was continually quoting Shakespeare, until he finally asked her one day, “What is it about Shakespeare?” She replied: “Have you not read Shakespeare?” “Never a line,” said he, “except in quotation.” “Then,” she said, “I advise you to read Shakespeare without delay.” “I acted upon her advice,” he said, “and very soon found that there was another world inside of the world in which I was living, about which I knew nothing.”

Hudson returned to Boston in 1844, where he continued lecturing on Shakespeare. His intellectual admirers included George Ticknor, Theodore Parker, Richard H. Dana, and Ralph Waldo Emerson.

In 1848, Hudson's Lectures on Shakespeare were published, in two volumes; it was so popular that a second edition was issued in the same year. Its popularity was assisted by the fact that the plates of Gulian C. Verplanck's pioneering 1847 American edition of Shakespeare had recently been destroyed by fire, and thus Hudson's edition had practical control of the market.

In 1849 he became a deacon in the Episcopal Church. From 1858 to 1860 he served as rector to a church in Litchfield, Connecticut. He edited the Churchman (1852–1855), founded and edited the Church Monthly (1855–1857), and edited the Boston Saturday Evening Gazette for "a few months" in 1857.

Hudson married Emily S. Bright, daughter of Henry Bright, Esq., of Northampton, on December 18, 1852.

During the American Civil War, Hudson served as a chaplain in the New York Volunteer Engineers, which was ordered South under General Benjamin Butler and took part in the Bermuda Hundred campaign. During Hudson's years in the Volunteers, he acted as a war correspondent with the New York Evening Post, writing under the pen name "Loyalty." After the Battle of Proctor's Creek (May 1864), the Evening Post published anonymously one of Hudson's private letters to Parke Godwin, which cast Butler in a bad light; shortly thereafter Hudson's son William died, and his wife became ill; and in September 1864 Hudson attempted to tender his resignation from the service. Rather than accept Hudson's resignation, Butler accused him of absence without leave and (less officially) of conspiring with General Gillmore against Butler. Hudson was confined to the bull-pen for 51 days without charges, being released from confinement on November 6, 1864, but kept under arrest for "more than three months." Butler would be recalled from command in early 1865. In February 1865 Hudson self-published the vitriolic 66-page brochure A Chaplain's Campaigns with General Butler, detailing his treatment by Butler; his impressions of Butler as a "worm," a "man that hath no music in himself," and worse; and a brief account of Butler's "absurd and infatuate" conduct at Proctor's Creek. This brochure naturally "produced a great sensation."

In 1881 he received an LL. D. degree from Middlebury College. Also in 1881 he brought out the "Harvard Shakespeare," an edition of all of Shakespeare's plays, with his own annotations.

When the Harvard Shakespeare was issued, it elicited unstinted praise from eminent Shakespeareans on both sides of the water. Mr. Frederick J. Furnivall, in his introduction to the Leopold Shakespeare, gave as the three best guides for students, Gervinus of Heidelberg, Dowden of Dublin, and Hudson of Boston.

For some twenty years he taught Shakespeare at the Gannett Institute for Young Ladies in Boston. He also taught "for years" at St. Paul's School in Concord, New Hampshire. Appletons' reports that at some point he taught Shakespeare at Boston University.

Hudson's last public appearance was a lecture on Cymbeline he gave at Wellesley College.

He died in Cambridge, Massachusetts, on January 16, 1886. He had been enfeebled for several years, and succumbed to the effect of the anesthetic during a scheduled, but "difficult and delicate," throat surgery. He was survived by his wife Emily, and by one son, who at that time lived in Omaha.

== Works ==
- Lectures on Shakespeare. 2 volumes. Boston, 1848.
- Works of Shakespeare, with notes. 11 volumes. Boston, 1851–1857.
- A Chaplain's Campaigns with General Butler. New York, 1865.
- School Shakespeare. Chicago, 1870.
- Shakespeare: His Life, Art, and Characters. 2 volumes. Boston, 1872.
- Sermons. Boston, 1874.
- Text-Book of Poetry, featuring works by Wordsworth, Coleridge, Burns, Beattie, Goldsmith, and Thomson. Boston, 1875.
- Text-Book of Prose, featuring excerpts from Burke, Webster, and Bacon. Boston, 1876.
- Studies in Wordsworth. Boston, 1884.
- A "series of text-books containing selections from the works of classic authors," including a "Classical English Reader" (1877), "Essays on Education," "English Studies," and other works.
- The "Harvard Shakespeare." 10 volumes; also available in 20 volumes 12o. 1881–1886.
