= Washington at Verplanck's Point =

1790 painting by John Trumbull

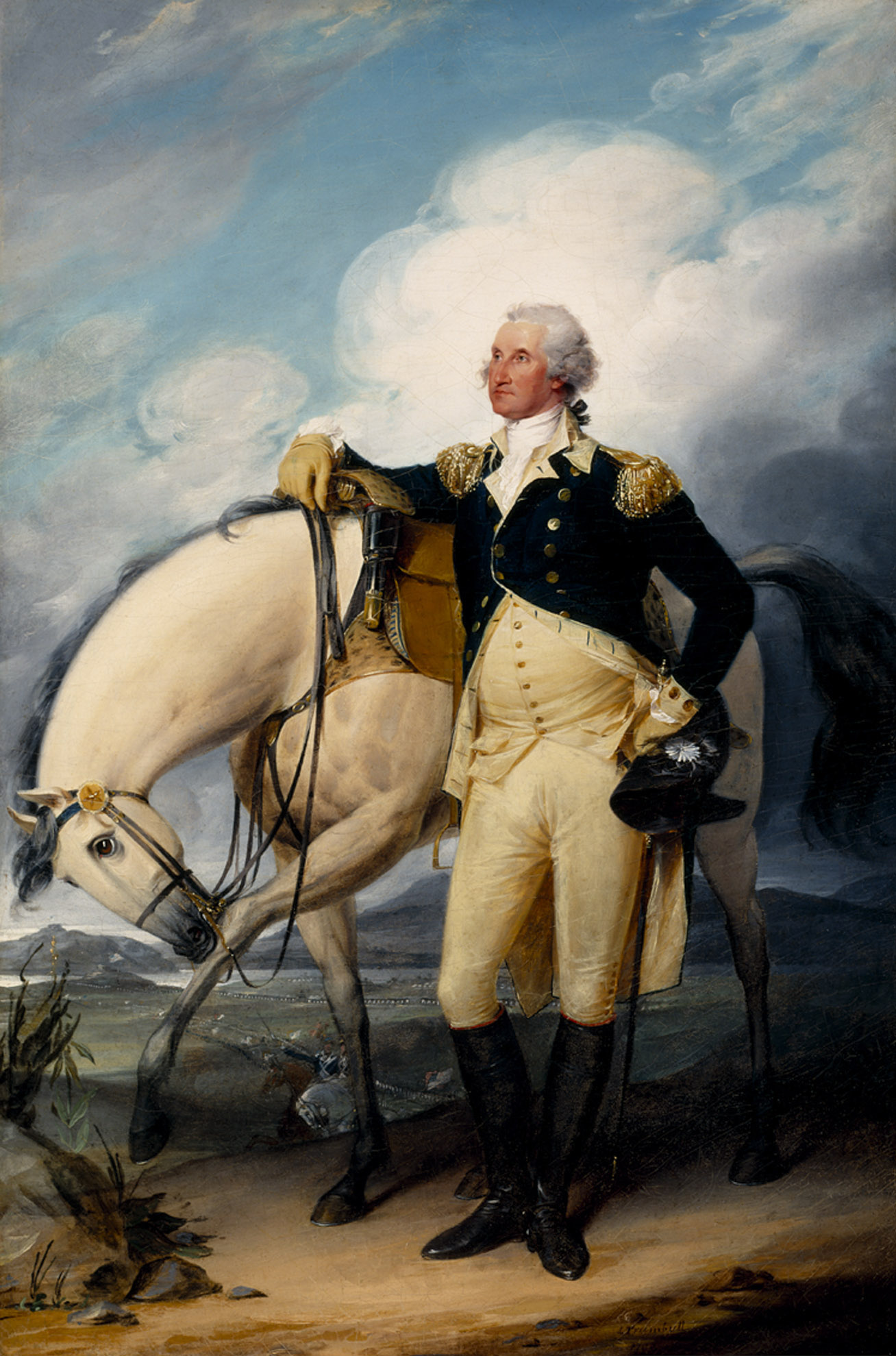
- Artist: John Trumbull
- Year: 1790
- Medium: oil on canvas
- Dimensions: 76.5 cm × 51.1 cm (30 1/8 in × 20 1/8 in)
- Location: Winterthur Museum, Garden and Library, Winterthur, Delaware, US

Washington at Verplanck's Point is a full-length portrait in oil painted in 1790 by the American artist John Trumbull of General George Washington at Verplanck's Point on the North River in New York during the American Revolutionary War. The background depicts the September 14, 1782 review of Continental Army troops Washington staged there as an honor for the departing French commander Comte de Rochambeau and his army. (Note: Washington wrote of the display: "As the intention of drawing out the troops tomorrow is to compliment his Excellency the Count de Rochambeau; The troops as he passes them shall pay him the honors due the commander in chief," adding with typical attention to detail, "On this occasion the tallest men are to be in the front rank.")

The painting was a gift from Trumbull to the president's wife, Martha Washington, and is now owned by the Winterthur Museum. Trumbull next received a commission from the City of New York and painted a much larger version, George Washington, with a new background, Evacuation Day of New York City, November 25, 1783, the return of Washington and the departure of British forces. It is on display in the Governor's Room of New York City Hall.

== Description ==
General George Washington is in full military uniform, a blue coat over buff waistcoat and pants. He is standing in front of his white horse, Blueskin, leaning on the saddle and holding the reins. Seen through the legs of the horse is a romanticized depiction of Washington's September 14, 1782 display of his Continental Army troops in honor of the Comte de Rochambeau, commander in chief of the French Expeditionary Force which had marched with him earlier to Yorktown, Virginia and, with the support of a French fleet lying offshore, helped force the October 19, 1781 surrender of British general Cornwallis and bring about a peace.

Upon Rochambeau's return north almost a full year later, (Note: There are discrepancies on the date, some citing the day of Rochambeau's arrival, Saturday, September 14, 1782, and others the following Sunday, September 21, with a French review of the Continental troops held on the 20st.) Washington staged a formal review of his troops at their encampment Verplanck's Point on the North River (today's Hudson) by the Comte. It was an honor due "his Excellency" both for his aid during the war and generosity in distributing to the Continental force arms, equipment, and clothing provided by France and captured by them from the British at Yorktown, as well as a thanks to the nation of France for its military assistance in winning the Colonies their freedom. Stony Point and the Hudson Highlands are also visible on the horizon.

== History ==
The painting was a gift to Martha Washington by Trumbull. After her death, the portrait was bequeathed to her granddaughter, Elizabeth Parke Custis Law. It remained in the family until sold in 1961 to Henry Francis du Pont who then donated it to his museum in 1964. In 1982, the Mount Vernon Ladies' Association purchased a modern copy of the painting by Adrian Lamb for display at Mount Vernon.

== Critical reception ==
Martha Washington's grandson, George Washington Parke Custis, wrote in his Recollections and Private Memoirs of Washington that:

The figure of Washington, as delineated by Colonel Trumbull, is the most perfect extant. So is the costume, the uniform of the staff in the war for Independence, being the ancient whig colors, blue and buff–a very splendid performance throughout ...

== Legacy ==
In 1889, for the centennial celebration of the inauguration of Washington as the first president of the United States, the original portrait, then owned by Edmund Law Rogers, grandson of Elizabeth Parke Custis Law, and the second, the city hall version, were on display together at the Metropolitan Opera House, New York City.

In 1982, a silver coin with a 30 dollar value was issued for Antigua & Barbuda commemorating the 250th anniversary of Washington's birth with this image of him at Verplanck's Point on the reverse side.

In 2017, Philip Mead, chief historian at the Museum of the American Revolution in Philadelphia, and museum curators found that a watercolor panorama by Pierre Charles L'Enfant was of this 1782 encampment at Verplanck's Point and included Washington's canvas marquee tent. R. Scott Stephenson, director of curatorial affairs at the museum, has stated that although the tent is not seen in Trumbull's painting, "because of this new watercolor and the research we've done, we can tell it shows Washington standing right in front of the tent."

== George Washington ==
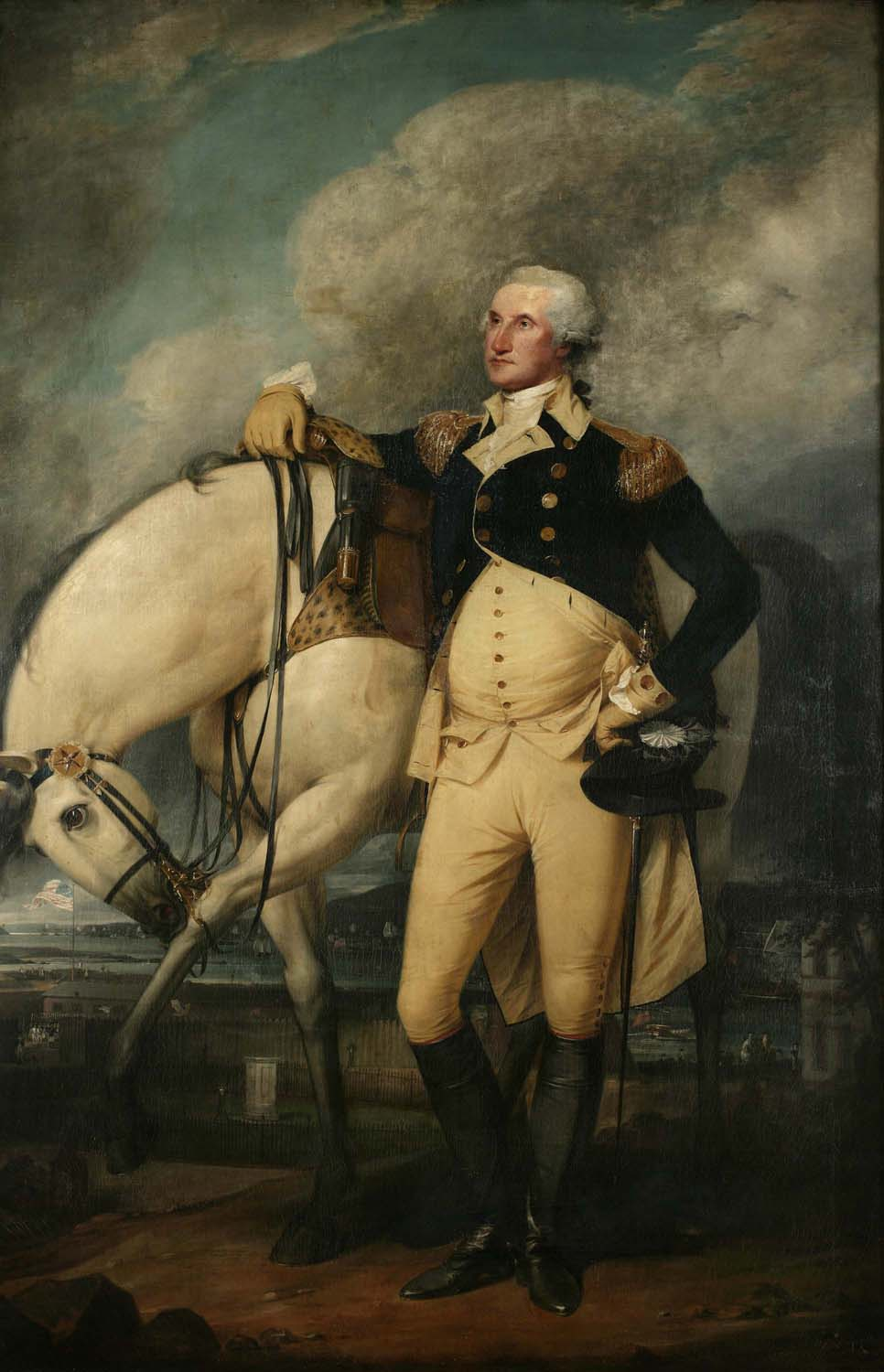
George Washington by John Trumbull, 1790, New York City Hall

In July, 1790, Trumbull received a commission from the corporation for the City of New York, led by Mayor Richard Varick, to paint the president's portrait.

The result, George Washington, was a scaling-up of Washington at Verplanck's Point to nearly four times its size. Also known as Washington and the Departure of the British Garrison from New York City, it is a (108 inches (270 cm) x 72 inches (180 cm)) full-length portrait in oil, generally similar in composition and character to its source but for its backdrop, which has been switched from Rochambeau's September 1782 review of the Continental Army to Evacuation Day, Washington's return to New York City upon the British forces' November 25, 1783 departure.

This painting is located in the historic Governor's Room of New York City Hall.

== See also ==
- General George Washington at Trenton – full-length portrait painted in 1792 by Trumbull
- List of paintings of George Washington
