= Buchanan, New York =

- Village
- Village of Buchanan
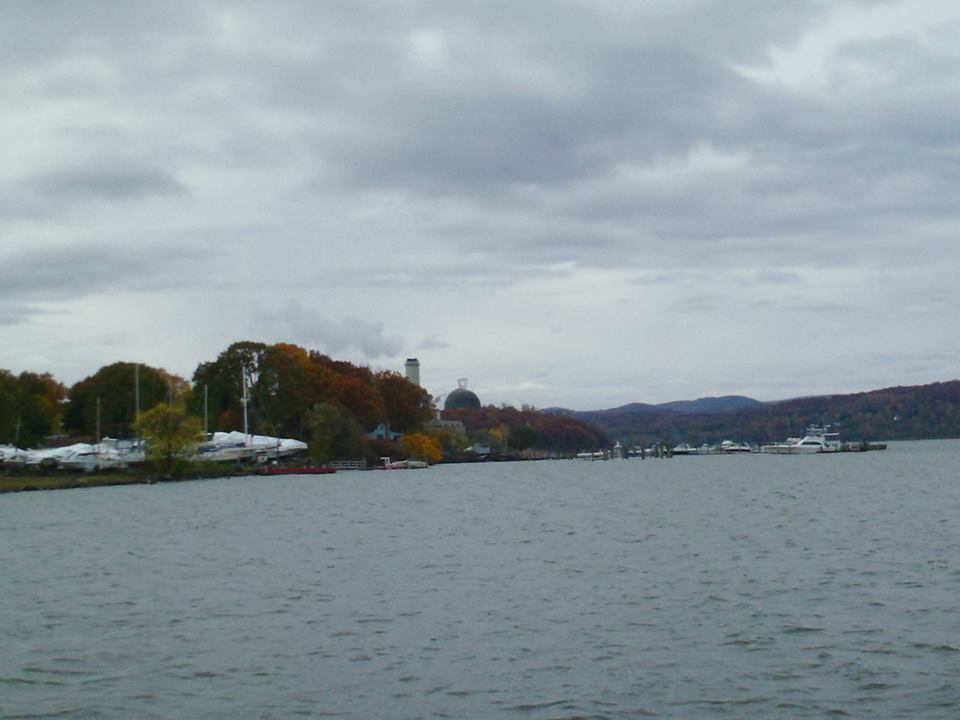
- View from the Hudson River

- Flag Seal

- Location of Buchanan, New York
- Coordinates: 41°15′39″N 73°56′30″W
- Country: United States
- State: New York
- County: Westchester
- Town: Cortlandt
- Established: 1928

Government
  - Mayor: Theresa Knickerbocker (I)
  - Board of Trustees: Members: • Daniel Stewart (Buchanan United); • Steve Laker (Buchanan United); • Awilda Baez (I); • Anthony Capicotti (Buchanan United)

Area
  - Total: 1.75 sq mi (4.53 km^{2})
  - Land: 1.42 sq mi (3.67 km^{2})
  - Water: 0.34 sq mi (0.87 km^{2})
- Elevation: 39 ft (12 m)

Population (2020)
  - Total: 2,302
  - Density: 1,626.3/sq mi (627.92/km^{2})
  - Demonym: Buchananite
- Time zone: UTC-5 (Eastern (EST))
  - Summer (DST): UTC-4 (EDT)
- ZIP code: 10511
- Area code: 914
- FIPS code: 36-10341
- GNIS feature ID: 0945006
- Website: https://buchananny.gov/

Buchanan is a village located in the town of Cortlandt in Westchester County, New York, United States. The population was 2,302 as of the 2020 census.

The now decommissioned Indian Point nuclear power facility is located in Buchanan. The 2000 Rockefeller Center Christmas tree also came from Buchanan. The 80-foot tall Norway spruce was donated by Bill and Frances Heady. Bill Heady planted the tree in 1950.

== Geography ==
Buchanan is located at 41°15′39″N 73°56′30″W.

According to the United States Census Bureau, the village has a total area of 1.7 square miles (4.4 km^{2}), of which 1.4 square miles (3.6 km^{2}) are land and 0.3 square miles (0.78 km^{2}), or 17.86%, is water.

== Demographics ==
Historical population
Census	Pop.	Note	%±
1930	1,346		—
1940	1,600		18.9%
1950	1,820		13.8%
1960	2,019		10.9%
1970	2,110		4.5%
1980	2,041		−3.3%
1990	1,970		−3.5%
2000	2,189		11.1%
2010	2,230		1.9%
2020	2,302		3.2%
U.S. Decennial Census

=== 2020 census ===
As of the 2020 census, Buchanan had a population of 2,302. The median age was 41.3 years. 20.7% of residents were under the age of 18 and 16.0% of residents were 65 years of age or older. For every 100 females there were 97.8 males, and for every 100 females age 18 and over there were 99.6 males age 18 and over.

100.0% of residents lived in urban areas, while 0.0% lived in rural areas.

There were 833 households in Buchanan, of which 34.9% had children under the age of 18 living in them. Of all households, 56.5% were married-couple households, 15.8% were households with a male householder and no spouse or partner present, and 21.2% were households with a female householder and no spouse or partner present. About 20.0% of all households were made up of individuals and 8.8% had someone living alone who was 65 years of age or older.

There were 877 housing units, of which 5.0% were vacant. The homeowner vacancy rate was 1.0% and the rental vacancy rate was 3.1%.

Racial composition as of the 2020 census
Race	Number	Percent
White	1,590	69.1%
Black or African American	82	3.6%
American Indian and Alaska Native	15	0.7%
Asian	65	2.8%
Native Hawaiian and Other Pacific Islander	0	0.0%
Some other race	258	11.2%
Two or more races	292	12.7%
Hispanic or Latino (of any race)	529	23.0%

=== 2000 census ===
As of the census of 2000, there were 2,189 people, 814 households, and 609 families residing in the village. The population density was 1,579.3 inhabitants per square mile (609.8/km^{2}). There were 912 housing units at an average density of 658.0 per square mile (254.1/km^{2}). The racial makeup of the village was 96.21% white, 0.69% African American, 0.18% Native American, 1.19% Asian, 0.78% from other races, and 0.96% from two or more races. Hispanic or Latino of any race were 3.47% of the population.

There were 814 households, out of which 36.4% had children under the age of 18 living with them, 60.0% were married couples living together, 11.1% had a female householder with no husband present, and 25.1% were non-families. 21.9% of all households were made up of individuals, and 8.7% had someone living alone who was 65 years of age or older. The average household size was 2.67 and the average family size was 3.12.

In the village, the population was spread out, with 24.5% under the age of 18, 7.1% from 18 to 24, 32.1% from 25 to 44, 23.5% from 45 to 64, and 12.8% who were 65 years of age or older. The median age was 38 years. For every 100 females, there were 99.7 males. For every 100 females age 18 and over, there were 99.2 males.

The median income for a household in the village was $62,604, and the median income for a family was $73,674. Males had a median income of $50,964 versus $33,667 for females. The per capita income for the village was 50,000. About 2.2% of families and 3.9% of the population were below the poverty line, including 6.3% of those under age 18 and 1.8% of those age 65 or over.

=== Community ===
Buchanan is also the smallest municipality in the world with a nuclear power plant.

Students in the village attend the Buchanan-Verplanck Elementary School or Frank G. Lindsey Elementary School, before moving on to the Blue Mountain Middle School and finally Hendrick Hudson High School.

The village has its own post office, police force, volunteer fire department—Buchanan Engine Company #1, and is served by Cortlandt Volunteer Ambulance in nearby Montrose.

== Education ==
The school district is Hendrick Hudson Central School District (HHSD). Hendrick Hudson High School is the district's comprehensive high school.

== Notable people of Buchanan ==
- Anastasia van Burkalow (1911 – 2004) was an American geographer and hymnologist and Professor Emerita of Hunter College.
