= Crugers, New York =

Hamlet and census-designated place in Cortlandt, New York

- CDP
- Location of Crugers, New York
- Coordinates: 41°13′59″N 73°55′18″W
- Country: United States
- State: New York
- County: Westchester
- Town: Cortlandt

Area
  - Total: 1.24 sq mi (3.20 km^{2})
  - Land: 0.66 sq mi (1.72 km^{2})
  - Water: 0.57 sq mi (1.48 km^{2})
- Elevation: 95 ft (29 m)

Population (2020)
  - Total: 1,627
  - Density: 2,449.9/sq mi (945.93/km^{2})
- Time zone: UTC−5 (Eastern (EST))
  - Summer (DST): UTC−4 (EDT)
- ZIP Code: 10521
- Area code: 914
- FIPS code: 36-19290
- GNIS feature ID: 0947860

Crugers is a hamlet and census-designated place (CDP) located in the town of Cortlandt, Westchester County, New York, United States. As of the 2020 census, Crugers had a population of 1,627.

== History ==
Crugers, New York, was named for Col. John P. Cruger.

The community formerly had two New York Central Railroad stations along the Hudson Line; one was Oscawana Station in Oscawana Park, and the other was named for the community at the northwestern end of Crugers Avenue across the tracks from the VA Hudson Valley Health Care System.

== Geography ==
According to the United States Census Bureau, the hamlet has a total area of 1.3 square miles (3.4 km^{2}), of which 0.7 square miles (1.8 km^{2}) is land and 0.6 square miles (1.6 km^{2}), or 44.44%, is water.

== Demographics ==
Historical population
Census	Pop.	Note	%±
2020	1,627		—
U.S. Decennial Census

As of the census of 2000, there were 1,752 people, 826 households, and 327 families residing in the hamlet. The population density was 2,506.4 inhabitants per square mile (967.7/km^{2}). There were 846 housing units at an average density of 1,210.3 per square mile (467.3/km^{2}). The racial makeup of the hamlet was 92.18% White, 4.05% African American, 0.51% Native American, 0.97% Asian, 1.14% from other races, and 1.14% from two or more races. Hispanic or Latino of any race were 3.54% of the population.

There were 826 households, out of which 13.7% had children under the age of 18 living with them, 33.8% were married couples living together, 5.2% had a female householder with no husband present, and 60.3% were non-families. 59.0% of all households were made up of individuals, and 44.6% had someone living alone who was 65 years of age or older. The average household size was 1.79 and the average family size was 2.90.

In the hamlet the population was spread out, with 12.8% under the age of 18, 2.5% from 18 to 24, 16.0% from 25 to 44, 21.9% from 45 to 64, and 46.8% who were 65 years of age or older. The median age was 63 years. For every 100 females, there were 70.9 males. For every 100 females age 18 and over, there were 66.3 males.

The median income for a household in the hamlet was $30,375, and the median income for a family was $86,598. Males had a median income of $58,571 versus $55,081 for females. The per capita income for the hamlet was $29,643. About 4.5% of families and 5.6% of the population were below the poverty line, including none of those under age 18 and 9.9% of those age 65 or over.

== Education ==
The school district is Hendrick Hudson School District (HHSD). Hendrick Hudson High School is the district's comprehensive high school.

== Transportation ==
U.S. Route 9 passes through the CDP

Metro-North Railroad's Hudson Line passes directly through the CDP and Cortlandt station is located just north of the CDP with hourly services to Grand Central Terminal and Poughkeepsie

== See also ==
- McAndrews Estate
