= Cortlandt, New York =

- Town
- Town of Cortlandt
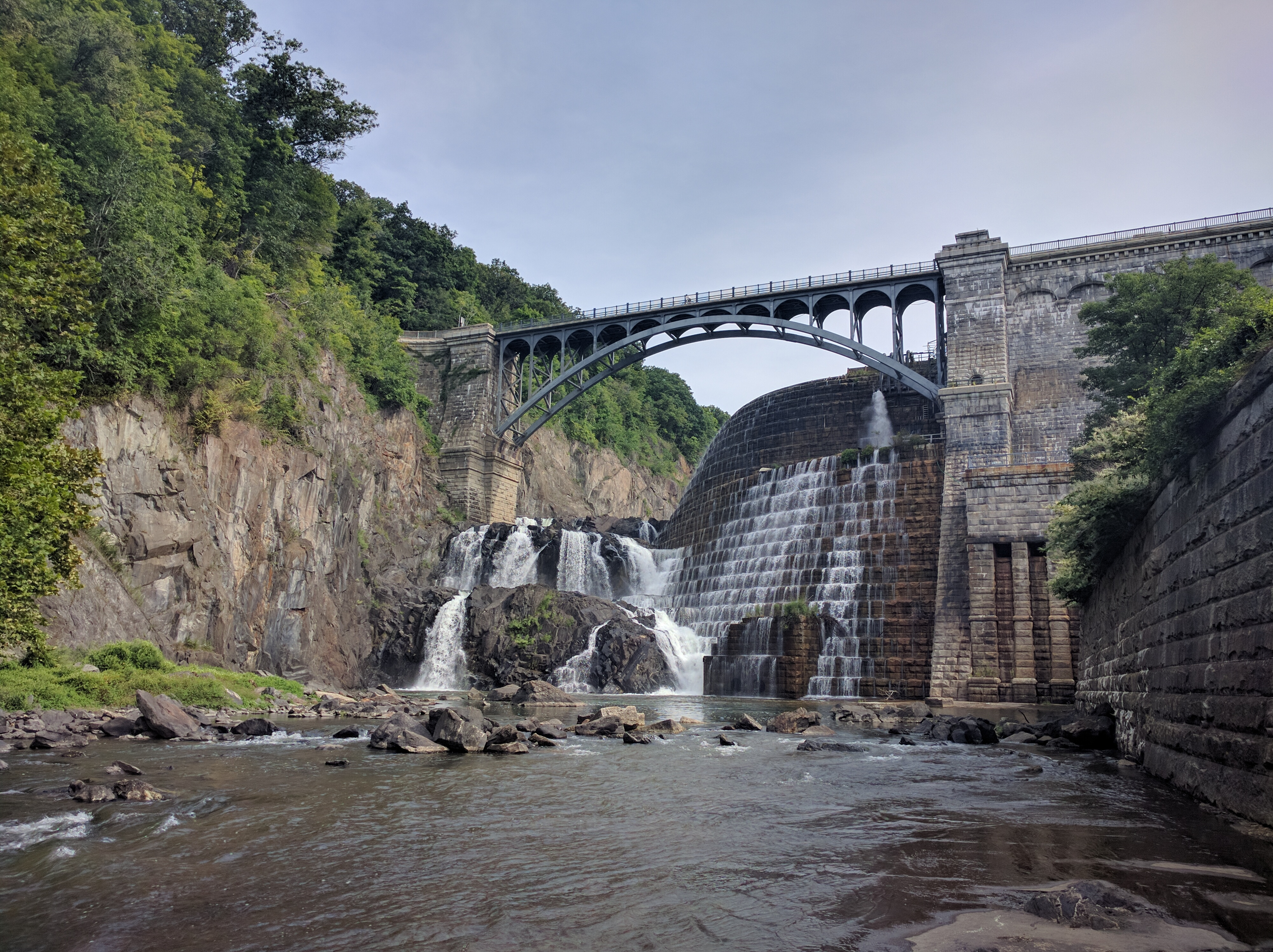
- Croton Gorge waterfall

- Seal

- Location of Cortlandt, New York
- Coordinates: 41°15′41″N 73°54′9″W
- Country: United States
- State: New York
- County: Westchester
- Founded: 1788

Government
  - Type: Manager-Council
  - Town Supervisor: Richard H. Becker (D)
  - Town Board: Members: • James F. Creighton (D); • Cristin Jacoby (D); • Francis X. Farrell (D); • Robert E. Mayes (D)

Area
  - Total: 50.02 sq mi (129.54 km^{2})
  - Land: 39.26 sq mi (101.68 km^{2})
  - Water: 10.76 sq mi (27.86 km^{2})
- Elevation: 318 ft (97 m)

Population (2020)
  - Total: 42,545
  - Density: 1,083.7/sq mi (418.42/km^{2})
- Time zone: UTC-5 (Eastern (EST))
  - Summer (DST): UTC-4 (EDT)
- FIPS code: 36-18410
- GNIS feature ID: 0978871
- Website: www.townofcortlandtny.gov

Cortlandt is a town in Westchester County, New York, United States, located at the northwestern edge of the county, at the eastern terminus of the Bear Mountain Bridge. As of the 2020 census, the population was 42,545. The town includes the villages of Buchanan and Croton-on-Hudson, as well as several hamlets and historic neighborhoods.

== History ==
The Bear Mountain Bridge Road and Toll House and the Old Croton Dam are listed on the National Register of Historic Places.

The Cortlandt area is known for its Revolutionary War history, specifically the location of the strategic King's Ferry between Stony Point and Verplanck's Point, which George Washington's army used to cross the Hudson on its march to Yorktown, Virginia, in 1781. John Trumbull's full-length oil portrait of Washington at Verplanck's Point exists in two versions.

== Geography ==
The town's western borders are the Hudson River and the city of Peekskill. Its northern borders are the towns of Philipstown and Putnam Valley in Putnam County. Its eastern border is the town of Yorktown. Its southern borders are the towns of New Castle and Ossining.

According to the United States Census Bureau, the town has a total area of 50.0 square miles (129.5 km^{2}), of which 39.3 square miles (101.7 km^{2}) is land and 10.8 square miles (27.9 km^{2}), or 21.51%, is water.

== Demographics ==
Historical population
Census	Pop.	Note	%±
1790	1,932		—
1820	3,421		—
1830	3,840		12.2%
1840	5,592		45.6%
1850	7,758		38.7%
1860	10,074		29.9%
1870	11,694		16.1%
1880	12,664		8.3%
1890	15,139		19.5%
1900	18,703		23.5%
1910	22,255		19.0%
1920	21,023		−5.5%
1930	26,492		26.0%
1940	11,016		−58.4%
1950	14,146		28.4%
1960	26,336		86.2%
1970	34,393		30.6%
1980	35,705		3.8%
1990	37,357		4.6%
2000	38,467		3.0%
2010	41,592		8.1%
2020	42,545		2.3%
U.S. Decennial Census

At the 2000 census there were 38,467 people in 13,517 households, including 10,137 families, in the town. The population density was 969.7 inhabitants per square mile (374.4/km^{2}). There were 14,065 housing units at an average density of 354.5 units per square mile (136.9 units/km^{2}). The racial makeup of the town was 88.60% White, 4.59% African American, 0.21% Native American, 2.57% Asian, 0.01% Pacific Islander, 2.35% from other races, and 1.68% from two or more races. Hispanic or Latino of any race were 7.19%.

Of the 13,517 households 39.3% had children under the age of 18 living with them, 64.3% were married couples living together, 7.9% had a female householder with no husband present, and 25.0% were non-families. 21.3% of households were one person and 8.8% were one person aged 65 or older. The average household size was 2.75 and the average family size was 3.22.

The age distribution was 26.5% under the age of 18, 5.3% from 18 to 24, 30.1% from 25 to 44, 25.3% from 45 to 64, and 12.8% 65 or older. The median age was 39 years. For every 100 females, there were 95.8 males. For every 100 females age 18 and over, there were 92.7 males.

The median household income was $75,442 and the median family income was $89,053. Males had a median income of $59,949 versus $41,115 for females. The per capita income for the town was $33,432. About 2.9% of families and 4.5% of the population were below the poverty line, including 4.1% of those under age 18 and 5.1% of those age 65 or over.

== Transportation ==
Commuter service to New York City is available via the Cortlandt train station and the Croton-Harmon train station, served by Metro-North Railroad. Croton-Harmon is also served by Amtrak.

U.S. Route 9 passes through the town along the Hudson River side.

The Appalachian Trail (AT) runs through a very small portion of the north west portion of the town near and over the Bear Mountain Bridge, which is the only section of the AT in Westchester County NY.

== Government ==
Cortlandt is governed by a town board and the Town Supervisor is Dr. Richard Becker, who replaced Linda Puglisi as the longest-serving Town Supervisor in the 200+-year history of the town (30 years). The mayors of Buchanan and Croton are Theresa Knickerbocker and Brian Pugh, respectively. Law enforcement services in Cortlandt are provided by the New York State Police and the Westchester County Department of Public Safety. The villages of Buchanan and Croton-on-Hudson also have their own, independent police departments.

== Villages and unincorporated communities in Cortlandt ==
- Buchanan – a village in the Town of Cortlandt
- Cortlandt Manor – a hamlet in the Town of Cortlandt
- Crompond – a hamlet partially in the Town of Cortlandt
- Croton-on-Hudson – a village in the Town of Cortlandt
- Crugers – a hamlet in the Town of Cortlandt
- Furnace Woods– a neighborhood
- Montrose – a hamlet in the Town of Cortlandt; includes Cortlandt station
- Mount Airy – a neighborhood
- Oscawana – a neighborhood, includes Oscawana Island
- Pleasantside– a neighborhood
- Roe Park– a neighborhood
- Toddville– a neighborhood
- Valeria– a neighborhood
- Van Cortlandtville – a neighborhood; the John Jones Homestead, Old St. Peter's Church, and Van Cortlandtville School are listed on the National Register of Historic Places
- Verplanck – a hamlet in the Town of Cortlandt
- Woodybrook– a neighborhood
