= Lake Oscawana =

Lake in New York State

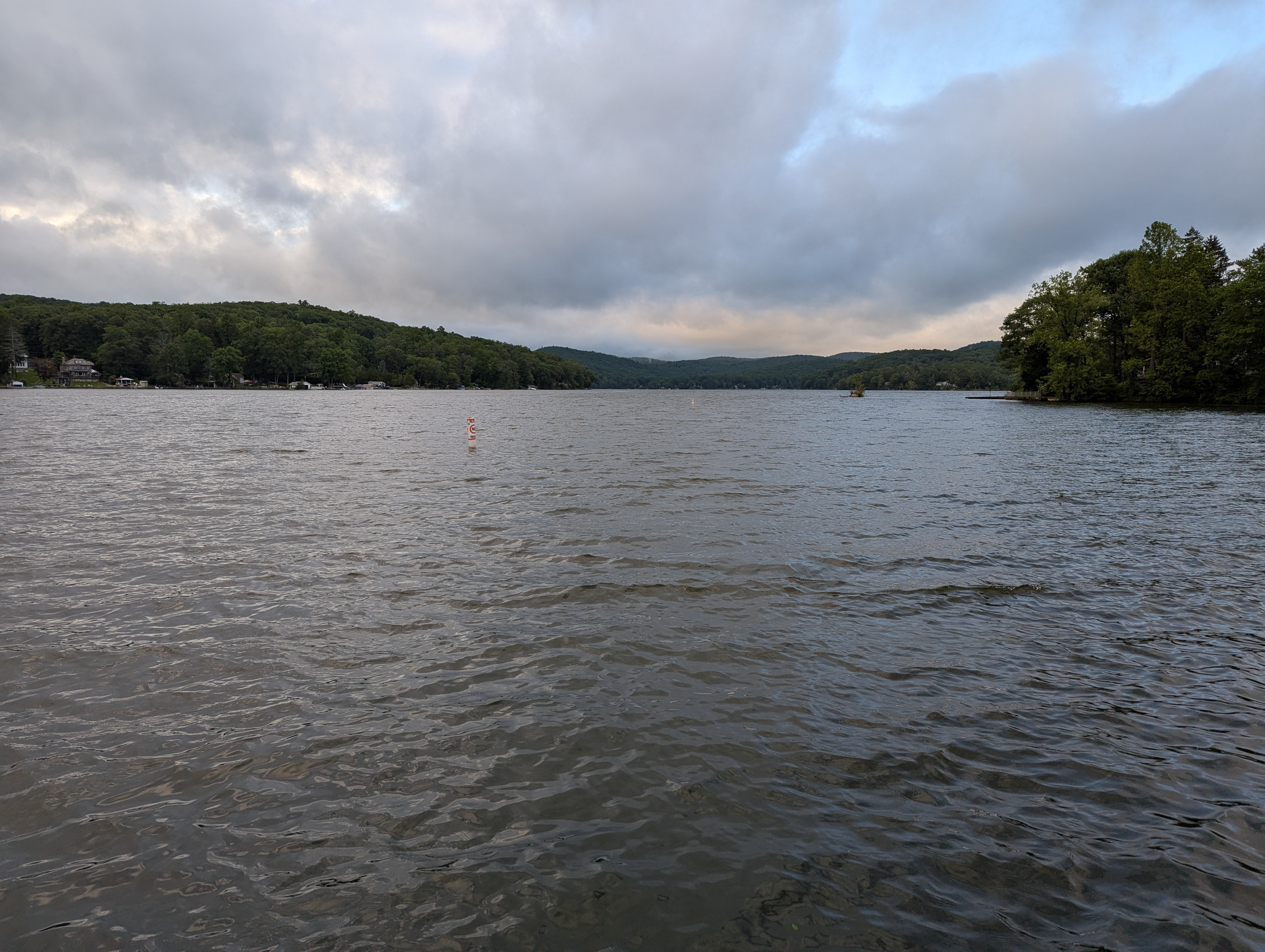
- Lake Oscawana in 2025

- Location within New York Location within the United States
- Location: Putnam County, New York, United States
- Coordinates: 41°23′48″N 73°50′54″W
- Basin countries: United States
- Surface area: 386 acres (156 ha)
- Max. depth: 30 ft (9.1 m)
- Surface elevation: 509 ft (155 m)

Lake Oscawana is a body of water located in Putnam Valley, New York, United States.

The 386-acre (1.6 km^{2}) lake has a depth that ranges from 25 to 30 feet (7.6 to 9.1 m) at its deepest. The lake is fed by a stream from its north end and it drains out into Oscawana Creek at the middle of its southeastern shore. It is located between two hill ranges. Oscawana Creek merges into Peekskill Hollow Creek near the intersection of Peekskill Hollow Road and Oscawana Lake Road in Putnam Valley the hamlet of Lake Peekskill.

The lake has a number of houses around its edges, several rock formations in the center of the lake, and small islands accessible by kayak or canoe. Lake Oscawana provides summer recreation, and some local residents use the lake for boating, swimming, and fishing from the lake's several private beaches.

It features a variety of wildlife including fish, Canada geese, water snakes, turtles, and an occasional stork. In the summer it is cleaned regularly by an aquatic weed harvester; however, as of 2020 the harvester was in disrepair, causing growth of invasive weeds. Since then, the lake community has addressed mounting issues of cyanobacteria blooms and filamentous algae using grass carp and aquatic herbicides. In the winter, the lake freezes over and allows for ice skating and ice fishing. There are reports of people falling through the ice in warmer winters.

== History ==
Lake Oscawana was said to be named by members of the Wappinger Indian Confederation, specifically the Nochpeem tribe, and varying spellings of the lake's name were written on tracts of land sold to the Van Cortlandt family in the 1680s. However, the lake was known from the early 19th century to the 1850s as Horton's Pond after its purchaser, Joshua Horton, who bought it and the surrounding land from a forfeiture commissioner following the American Revolution.

The lake has had a thriving summer resort community surrounding it since the 1850s, around which time the area was accessible by an hour-and-a-half drive from the Peekskill train station. Taxi carriages to and from the region were pulled by mules; these carts were also used to carry coal to mills near Oregon Corners along Oscawana Lake Road. Bus service to the lake started in the 1920s up until the 1940s.

There was an icehouse on Lake Oscawana, which made up the only major industry on the lake. It supplied ice to summer visitors and the Oscawana Lake House, a summer resort built in 1856 by Abijah Lee. A gristmill was present on the eastern side of the lake, the location of which was noted as Abele Cove.

=== Celebrity residences ===
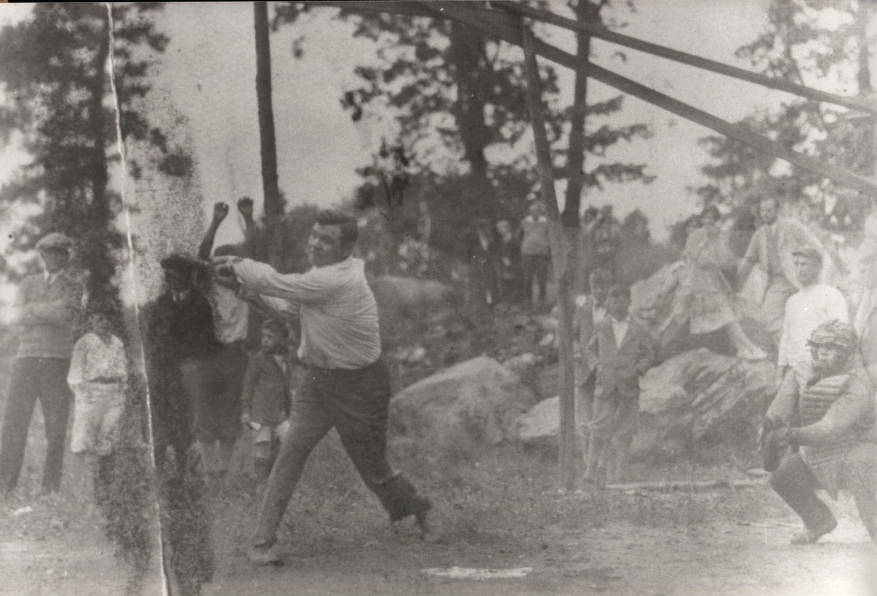
Babe Ruth playing baseball with local children near Oscawana Lake

Babe Ruth is known to have spent some time on the lake at the home of his business manager, Christy Walsh. At the time, the lake housed many hotels and resorts. He visited the lake from 1925 to 1939, with Walsh stating that the lake was a safer setting for Ruth due to his propensity to "overindulge" in food and drink. He would often play pick-up games of baseball in a vacant lot off of Dunderburg Road.

Other former residents include Adam Levy and Roy Scheider. Scheider's house was filmed in the Adirondack Lake house scene in The Sopranos episode, "Soprano Home Movies". Judge Judy and Dr. Ruth have also lived along the lake.
