= Mid-Hudson Library System =

Public library system in New York State, US

Coordinates: 41.700370°N 73.930428°W

The Mid-Hudson Library System (MHLS) is a public library system in the Hudson Valley of New York. It was established in 1959 by the State of New York.

MHLS comprises libraries in five counties: Columbia County, Dutchess County, Greene County, Putnam County and Ulster County. The System's headquarters is in the city of Poughkeepsie.

== Member libraries ==
=== Columbia County ===
Member Library	Location	Image	Collection (2018)	Historical notes
Canaan Branch Library	Canaan		2,653	
Chatham Public Library	Chatham		34,932	
Claverack Free Library	Claverack		18,537	
Germantown Library	Germantown		14,917	
Roeliff Jansen Community Library	Hillsdale		30,619	
Hudson Area Library	Hudson		22,369	
Kinderhook Memorial Library	Kinderhook		16,701	
Livingston Free Library	Livingston		4,925	
New Lebanon Library	New Lebanon		24,611	
North Chatham Free Library	North Chatham		18,400	
Philmont Public Library	Philmont		18,263	
Valatie Free Library	Valatie		10,129	

=== Dutchess County ===
Member Library	Location	Image	Collection (2018)	Historical notes
Amenia Free Library	Amenia		9,300	
Howland Public Library	Beacon		52,432	
Beekman Library	Beekman		30,572	
Clinton Community Library	Clinton		10,359	
Dover Plains Library	Dover Plains		26,421	
East Fishkill Community Library	East Fishkill		63,171	
Blodgett Memorial Library	Fishkill		41,491	
Hyde Park Library	Hyde Park		40,860	
LaGrange Association Library	LaGrange		52,220	
Millbrook Library	Millbrook		44,493	
Northeast-Millerton Library	Millerton		20,234	
Pawling Free Library	Pawling		27,129	
Pine Plains Free Library	Pine Plains		11,391	
Pleasant Valley Library	Pleasant Valley		46,954	
Adriance Memorial Library	Poughkeepsie (Market St.)		192,039	
Boardman Road Branch Library	Poughkeepsie (Boardman Rd.)		60,896	
Red Hook Public Library, Inc.	Red Hook		25,559	
Starr Library	Rhinebeck		38,454	
Morton Memorial Library and Community House	Rhinecliff		11,216	
Staatsburg Library	Staatsburg		19,936	
Stanford Free Library	Stanford		24,311	
Tivoli Free Library	Tivoli		14,580	
Grinnell Public Library District	Wappingers Falls		45,484	

=== Greene County ===
Member Library	Location	Image	Collection (2018)	Historical notes
D.R. Evarts Library	Athens		9,977	
Cairo Public Library	Cairo		30,189	
Catskill Public Library	Catskill		21,065	
Heermance Memorial Library	Coxsackie		16,048	
Greenville Public Library	Greenville		27,650	
Hunter Public Library	Hunter		15,576	
Mountain Top Library	Tannersville		18,905	
Palenville Branch Library	Palenville		8,292	
Windham Public Library	Windham		19,432	

=== Putnam County ===
Member Library	Location	Image	Collection (2018)	Historical notes
Brewster Public Library	Brewster		26,697	
Julia L. Butterfield Memorial Library	Cold Spring		19,378	
Reed Memorial Library	Carmel		22,882	
Alice Curtis Desmond and Hamilton Fish Library	Garrison		37,797	
Kent Public Library	Kent		55,730	
Mahopac Public Library	Mahopac		113,050	
Patterson Library	Patterson		28,494	
Putnam Valley Free Library	Putnam Valley		43,991	

=== Ulster County ===
Member Library	Location	Image	Collection (2018)	Historical notes
Clintondale Branch Library	Clintondale		6,381	
Town of Esopus Library	Esopus		28,330	
Highland Public Library	Highland		30,619	
Hurley Library	Hurley		11,155	
Kingston Library	Kingston (Franklin St.)		62,810	
Town of Ulster Public Library	Kingston (Ulster Ave.)		44,947	
Marlboro Free Library	Marlboro		26,054	
Sarah Hull Hallock Free Library	Milton		17,399	
Elting Memorial Library	New Paltz		74,436	
Olive Free Library Association	Olive		36,020	
Phoenicia Library	Phoenicia		11,759	
Morton Memorial Library	Pine Hill		6,900	
Plattekill Public Library	Plattekill		23,160	
Rosendale Library	Rosendale		21,549	
Saugerties Public Library	Saugerties		54,611	
Stone Ridge Library	Stone Ridge		29,801	
West Hurley Public Library	West Hurley		19,623	
Woodstock Public Library District	Woodstock		51,118	
