= Pine Hill Historic District =

Historic district in New York, United States

- U.S. National Register of Historic Places
- U.S. Historic district
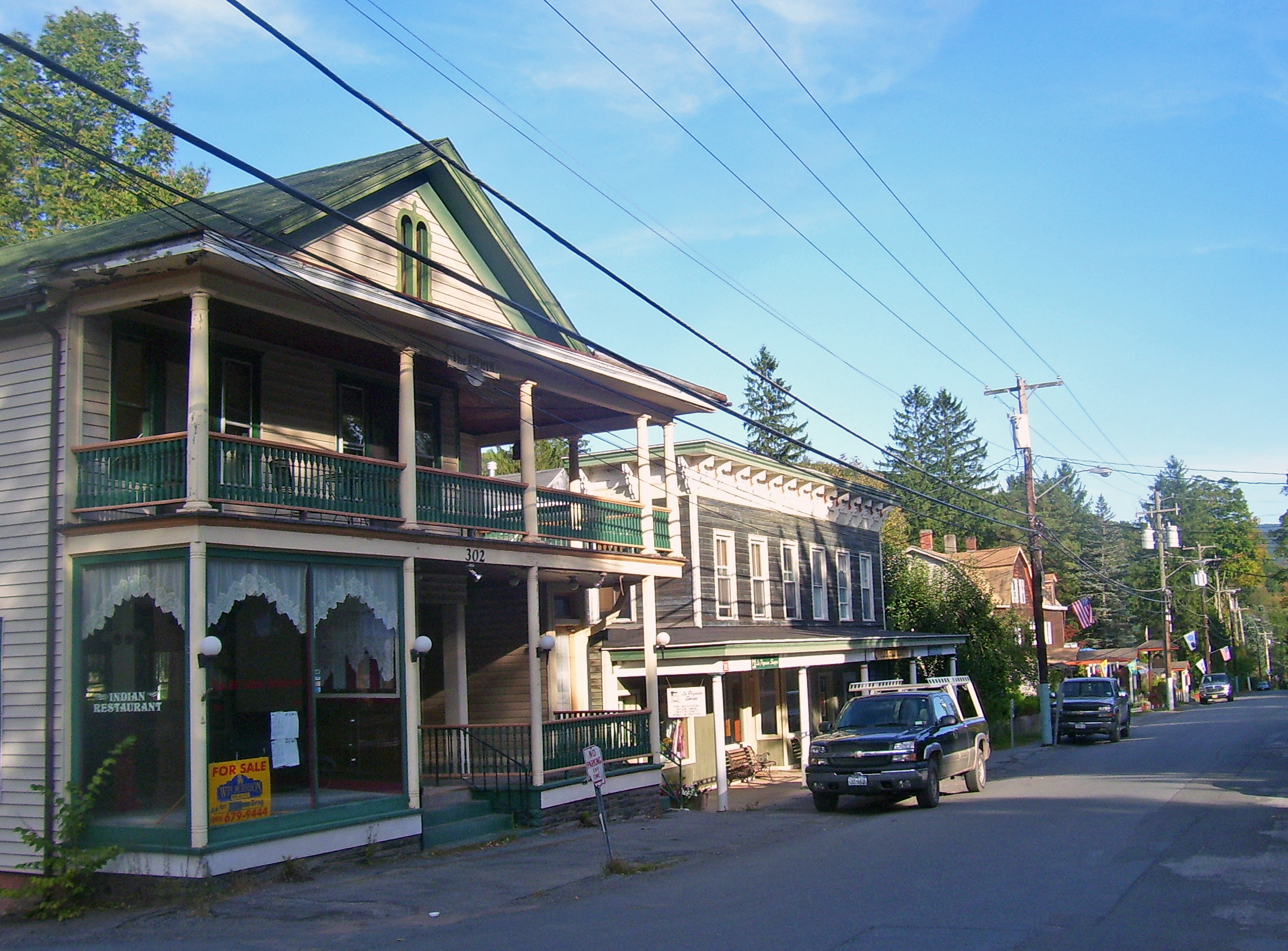
- Downtown Pine Hill, NY, September 2008

- Location within New York Location within the United States
- Location: Main, Academy, Elm, & Mill Sts., Bonnieview Ave., Pine Hill, Salomone, Station, & Old Turnpike Rds., Pine Hill, New York
- Coordinates: 42°07′58″N 74°28′49″W
- Area: 86.74 acres (35.10 ha)
- Built: c. 1800-1962
- Architectural style: Greek Revival, Gothic Revival, Stick Style, Italianate, Second Empire, Queen Anne, Colonial Revival, Classical Revival, Bungalow/Craftsman
- NRHP reference No.: 12000513
- Added to NRHP: August 14, 2012

Pine Hill Historic District is a national historic district located at Pine Hill, Ulster County, New York. It encompasses 125 contributing buildings, 3 contributing sites, 2 contributing structures, and 1 contributing object in the hamlet of Pine Hill. It developed between about 1800 and 1962 and includes notable examples of Greek Revival, Carpenter Gothic (Gothic Revival), Italianate, Stick Style, Second Empire, Queen Anne, Colonial Revival, Classical Revival, and Bungalow / American Craftsman architecture. Located in the district are the separately listed District School No. 14, Elm Street Stone Arch Bridge, Mill Street Stone Arch Bridge, Morton Memorial Library, and Ulster House Hotel. Other notable contributing resources include the John C. Loomis House (c. 1855), Methodist Episcopal Church (c. 1860), Benjamin Franklin Cornish House (c. 1860), Elizabeth Smith House (1876), Orchard Park House (1882), and "The Zepher" (c. 1895).

It was listed on the National Register of Historic Places in 2012.
