= Maren Dammann =

German author

Maren Dammann (born February 23, 1983, in Wermelskirchen) is a German scientist and novelist. She writes both adult and adolescent fiction.

== Life and career ==
After migrating to Australia, Dammann graduated from the University of Southern Queensland with a Bachelor of Science in environmental management in 2008, followed by a Master of Science at the University of Queensland.

From its inception in 2008 until the exit in 2021, she jointly managed the language service provider XINE Communication in Brisbane with her partner Christian Dammann.

From 2016 to 2021, she researched in the field of process optimisation through offshore outsourcing and in 2021 published her doctoral thesis at the University of Southern Queensland.

== Bibliography ==
- Marwani: Mitten ins Herz. Thienemann-Esslinger Verlag, 2019, ISBN 978-3-522-50621-2.
- Marwani: Přímo do srdce. Cpress, 2020, ISBN 978-80-264-3847-2
- using the pen name Josefine Meyer: Das Echo der Traumzeit. Tinte & Feder, 2020, ISBN 978-2-496-70175-3.
- Amaris: Mit dem Wind um die Wette. Thienemann-Esslinger Verlag, 2020, ISBN 978-3-522-50687-8.
- Amaris - S větrem o závod. Cpress, 2021. ISBN 978-80-264-4001-7
- using the pen name Lea Lobrecht: Im Land der wilden Pfoten. HarperCollins, 2022, ISBN 3749902348.
- Ich bin Flocke: Zu viel Talent, zu wenig Möhren! Ueberreuter Verlag, 2022, ISBN 978-3764152079.
- Ich bin Flocke: Zu viel Talent, zu wenig Möhren!, audio book, Ueberreuter audio Verlag, 2022.
- using the pen name Marieke Hansen: Seehundsommer. Lübbe, 2022, ISBN 978-3404187836.
- using the pen name Marieke Hansen: Seehundsommer. LübbeAUDIO, 2022.
- Lektorin meines Lebens, Short story in Urlaubslesebuch 2022. dtv Verlagsgesellschaft mbH & Co. KG, 2022. ISBN 3423219939
- Ich bin Flocke: Alle Hufe voll zu tun! Ueberreuter Verlag, 2023, ISBN 978-3-7641-5245-1.
- using the pen name Marieke Hansen: Friesenfrische. Lübbe, 2023, ISBN 978-3-404-18954-0.
- Wiener Melange, Short story in Nächstes Jahr schenken wir uns nichts – Weihnachtsgeschichten. dtv Verlagsgesellschaft mbH & Co. KG, 2023. ISBN 978-3423218894
- using the pen name Marieke Hansen: Krabbenglück. Lübbe, 2024, ISBN 978-3404193271.
- using the pen name Josefine Meyer: Ein Sommer in Pine Hill. Montlake, 2024, ISBN 978-2496716405.
- using the pen name Marieke Hansen: Küstenrauschen. Lübbe, 2025, ISBN 978-3-404-19460-5
- using the pen name Marieke Hansen: Nordwindworte. Lübbe, 2026, ISBN 978-3-404-19657-9
