= Morton Memorial Library =

Morton Memorial Library may refer to:

- Morton Memorial Library (Pine Hill, New York), listed on the National Register of Historic Places (NRHP)
- Morton Memorial Library (Rhinecliff, New York), also listed on the NRHP
