= Tompkins Corners United Methodist Church =

Historic church in New York, United States

Tompkins Corners
- United Methodist Church
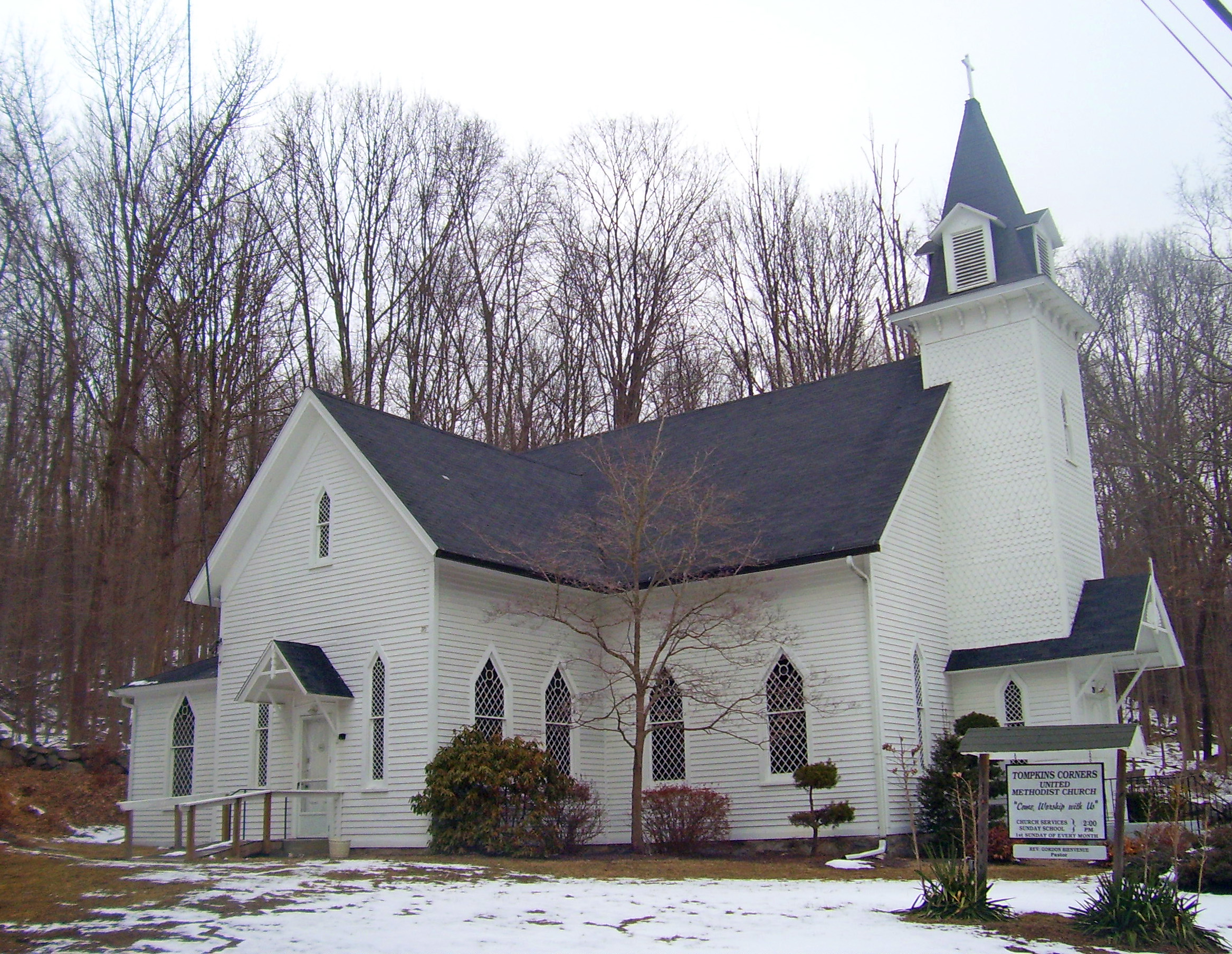
- East profile and south elevation, 2009

Religion
- Affiliation: United Methodist Church
- Status: Closed

Location
- Location: Putnam Valley, NY, USA
- Interactive map of Tompkins Corners
- Coordinates: 41°23′59″N 73°48′4″W

Architecture
- Architect: Robert Barker
- Groundbreaking: 1890
- Completed: 1891

Specifications
- Direction of façade: South
- Spire: 1
- Materials: Wood

U.S. National Register of Historic Places
- Added to NRHP: March 31, 1983
- NRHP Reference no.: 83001759

Tompkins Corners United Methodist Church - now known as the Tompkins Corners Cultural Center - is located along Peekskill Hollow Road (Putnam County Route 21) in Putnam Valley, New York, United States. It is a wooden frame structure built in the 1890s. In 1983 it was listed on the National Register of Historic Places, the only property exclusively in Putnam Valley to so far receive that distinction. (Note: Part of the county's stretch of the Taconic State Parkway runs through Putnam Valley.)

The congregation was founded in 1789, making it one of the oldest Methodist churches in the state outside of New York City. It can trace its roots to early missionary work by Methodist evangelist Freeborn Garrettson. Today it is owned by a New York State not-for-profit organization known as the Tompkins Corners Cultural Center, Inc. and is open to the general public for visual and performing arts events, classes and workshops. It can also be rented by individuals and community groups for meetings and events.

In 1833 the first church on the site was built. By 1890 it had become outdated, and the current structure replaced it the next year. Its L shape, unusual for that era, was necessitated by the reuse of the original church's foundation. A nearby carriage house, used in the past for church events and today as storage space, remains from the original church. It is a contributing resource to the National Register listing.

== Buildings and grounds ==
The church is located along the north side of Peekskill Hollow, a short distance northeast of its four-way intersection with New Hill and Wiccopee roads that gives Tompkins Corners its name. A half-mile (800 m) to the north is the Carmel town line; another half-mile further is Peekskill Hollow's interchange with the Taconic State Parkway. The area is mostly wooded; the southern end of Fahnestock State Park is a half-mile to the north.

Ten other buildings are in the vicinity, all wooden as well. They are mostly houses except for some commercial structures at the intersection. On either side of the road hills rise steeply as the road follows Peekskill Hollow Brook with a small nearby gap where the tributary Wiccopee Brook flows through along the eponymous road.

=== Exterior ===
The building itself is an L-shaped two-and-a-half-story wooden clapboard-sided building on a stone foundation with gabled roofs covered in asphalt shingles. On the south (front) facade there is a centrally located bell tower. The main wing projects from the west side; there is a small apse projecting from the north and a more modern wing from it. An engaged modern furnace flue is in the east side near the northeast corner.

Its main block is two bays by four. On the sides pointed-arch windows are set with double-hung sash windows set with diamond-pane stained glass. Both the centrally located main entrance and the secondary entrance on the west side are flanked with narrower versions of the same windows. A similar, shorter window is in the west gable apex.

The tower has two similar, narrower windows on either side. A cantilevered, gabled roof, supported by diagonal bracing, shelters the main entrance. It is trussed by intersecting fretwork and a wooden cutwork sunburst. A similar, more restrained hood, with a turned spindle in place of the sunburst, shelters the secondary entrance, which has a slightly curved wooden wheelchair ramp leading up to it.

Unlike the main block, the tower is sided in a mix of round, hollow-round, and diamond-shaped shingles. A single narrow window, with the same treatment as the rest of the windows, is centrally located above the entrance. Above it, a bracketed cornice similarly contrasts with the plain roofline of the main block. It delineates a pyramidal asphalt-shingled roof pierced by gabled dormer windows now set with louvered vents. They are topped with gabled hoods set with a quatrefoil. At the pinnacle of the tower is a cross.

=== Interior ===
Concrete steps with wrought iron guardrails lead to the main entrance. A round-arched door in a pointed-arch entryway opens into the carpeted sanctuary. The plush pews, cushioned in velvet, contrast with the otherwise restrained interior of wainscoting up to the chair rail that runs around the room, simple moldings elsewhere in the room, and plasterwork around the chandelier mounts.

At the rear the pulpit is on a slightly raised platform. It is centered in a round arch cut in the wall in such a way as to obstruct the upper portion of the rear windows. Double doors on the west wall lead to the wing, used for Sunday school during the church's active years. The newer wing on the north houses a modern kitchen and bathroom.

=== Carriage house ===
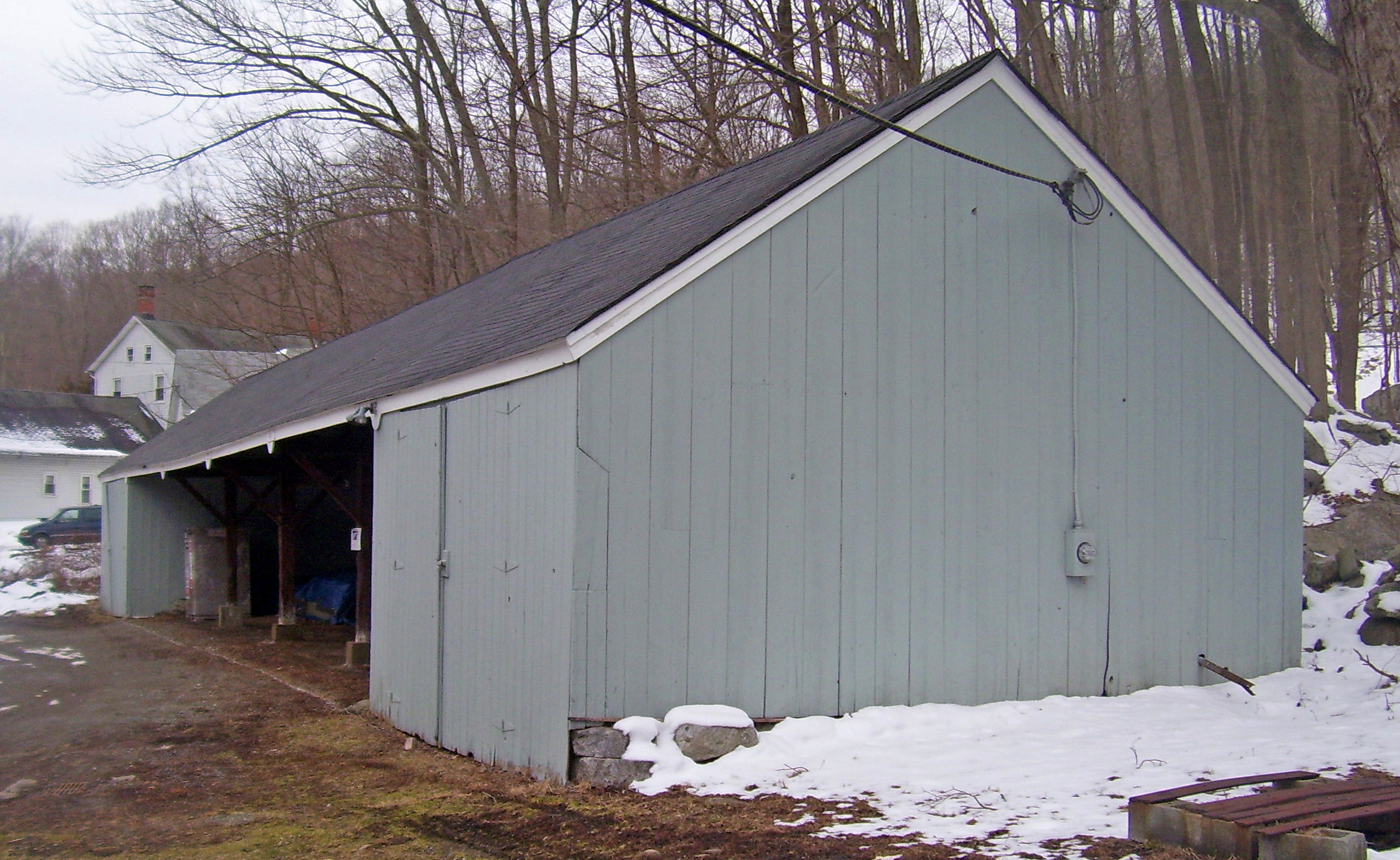
Carriage house

A hundred feet (30 m) southwest of the church along the road is the old carriage house. It is a long wood-frame structure of plain vertical flushboard without windows. A gabled roof is shingled in asphalt. The interior includes hand-hewn beams The original stone foundation has been replaced by concrete, but it is otherwise intact. It has mainly been used for storage.

== History ==
During the colonial era, the confluence of the two creeks led to the improvement of the Native American paths that followed them into roads. An intersection was a likely place for a settlement to establish itself, and sometime before the Revolution one did. Four brothers relocated from Eastchester, farther south, to what was even then known as Peekskill Hollow. Tompkins Corners took its name from them, appearing on maps as a well-developed community by at least 1788.

The following year, the records of Francis Asbury, an early American Methodist bishop who had been traveling a circuit in the nearby Philipstown area under the direction of Freeborn Garrettson, record that he addressed a meeting of Methodists in Tompkins Corners, although he referred to it as Peekskill Hollow. The existence of a group of attendees suggests that his audience had already been meeting in each other's homes for some time prior. The Tompkins Corners congregation was thus one of the oldest Methodist churches outside New York City, and possibly in the country.

Meetings continued, although without any formal organization for some time. Not until 1834 did the church elect trustees from among its membership. The next year a committee on the Philipstown circuit was formed to explore the feasibility of building the circuit's fifth meeting house in Tompkins Corners. The land was obtained in March of that year and Robert Barker, the congregation's secretary, was delegated to design the structure.

For the next 50 years the church grew and prospered as a social center in the only built-up area in the town of Putnam Valley. It supported a Sunday school and a Ladies' Aid Society. In the early 1880s, in response to that growth, the carriage house was built.

By 1890, however, the original church, with its high-backed pews and wood-burning stove in the center aisle, was showing its age. It was demolished and replaced with the current church in 1891. The congregation met in what is now Putnam Valley's Old Town Hall during the construction of the replacement building.

The architect was Robert Barker, nephew of the similarly named original builder and an engineer at nearby Mahopac Mines. The most striking feature of his design is the L shape, unusual in vernacular buildings of that era, made necessary by the decision to reuse the original church's foundation. At the same time, its exterior shows the strong influence of contemporary Victorian trends. The pointed-arch windows reinforce the roofline. And while the main block's clapboard siding and unadorned roofline are very traditional for churches, they are contrasted by the shingles on the tower and its bracketed cornice.

In 1935, to celebrate the church's centenary, the interior of the sanctuary was renovated. Heating and electricity were installed, the pews were cushioned and a bell hung in the tower. Later, shortly before it was listed on the Register, the floor was carpeted. At some point the carriage house's original foundation was replaced with the current concrete, and the gabled roof was installed.

The year after the listing, the church celebrated its 150th anniversary, an event that drew in the entire community. U.S. Rep. Hamilton Fish and New York State Assemblyman Vincent Leibell were the guests of honor. The ceremony concluded with a representative of the state's Historic Preservation Office presenting the church trustees with the certificate of its listing on the Register.

Through the rest of the 20th century, the church remained an important part of the community. It hosted cultural events including the premieres of plays and musical performances. Jane Alexander and David Amram were among those who made appearances at Tompkins Corners. The carriage house hosted a local farmer's market. However, with the changes in the area the church's attendance began to decline, and after the retirement of its last pastor in 2011 the United Methodist conference closed the church.

In 2015, the members of the local community, including musician, photographer, and filmmaker John Cohen, purchased the church to turn it into the Tompkins Corners Cultural Center.

== See also ==
- National Register of Historic Places listings in Putnam County, New York
