= Elm Street Stone Arch Bridge =

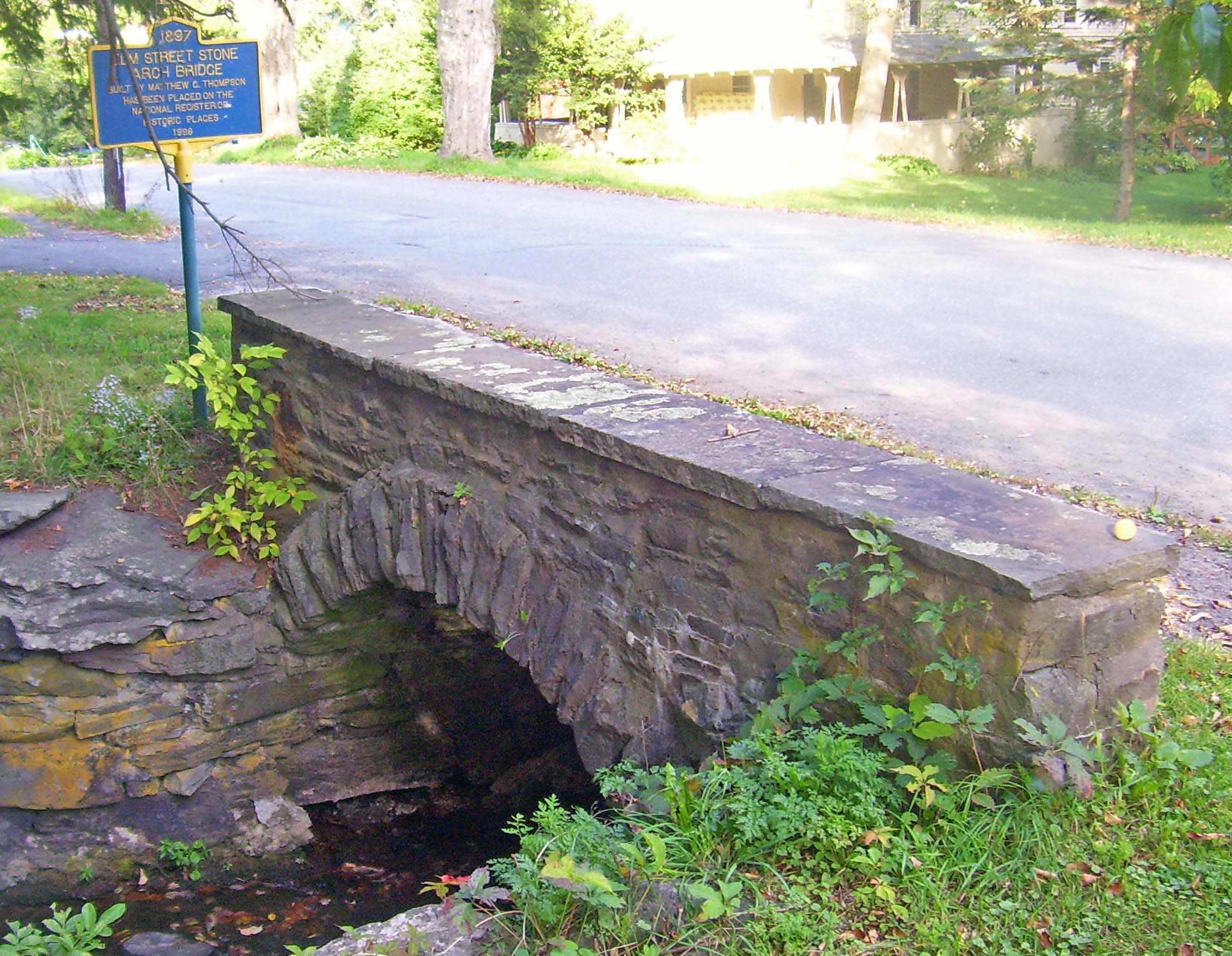
- Bridge in 2008
- Coordinates: 42°8′0″N 74°28′46″W
- Carries: Elm Street
- Crosses: Alton Creek
- Locale: Pine Hill, NY, USA
- Maintained by: Town of Shandaken
- Heritage status: NRHP# 96001437

Characteristics
- Design: Stone arch bridge
- Material: Stone
- Total length: 12 feet (3.7 m)
- No. of spans: 1
- Clearance below: 6 feet (1.8 m)

History
- Designer: Matthew G. Thompson
- Constructed by: Matthew G. Thompson
- Construction start: 1900

Location
- Interactive map of Elm Street Stone Arch Bridge

The Elm Street Stone Arch Bridge is located along that street in Pine Hill, New York, United States. It is a short bridge built over Alton Creek in the early 20th century using stonemasonry techniques and an arch bridge design that had been employed in the Catskills since the 18th century, one. As one of the few extant and intact bridges in that style in the region, it was listed on the National Register of Historic Places in 1996 along with the nearby Mill Street Stone Arch Bridge. It is located in the Pine Hill Historic District.

The bridge is located along Elm Street approximately 250 feet (76 m) north of Pine Hill's Main Street. The stonework is still in place along the west side; a modern culvert carries the creek out the east side. A short distance to the north along Elm are the Morton Memorial Library and the former District School No. 14, now home to the Shandaken Historical Society, both also listed on the Register.

Structurally, the bridge is a 12-foot–long (4 m) arch 6 feet (2 m) above the creek level, carrying the paved street. It is built of locally quarried stone using rough voussoirs with a central keystone, anchored in abutments of larger stone courses dressed to allow for tight mortar joints. The spandrel walls are of random coursed stone mortared in place.

In 1897 the Shandaken Town Board approved the construction of the two bridges in Pine Hill. Three years later it hired local mason Matthew G. Thompson to build the bridge for $208 ($7,900 in contemporary dollars). He employed construction techniques dating to the early 18th century, in which the abutments were built first on a small span, followed by a temporary wooden centering to support the arch. Its interior would be filled with earth or stone, and often waterproofed with coal tar or mortar on the inside of the stonework. On the exterior joints packed as tightly as possible prior to mortaring. The centering would be left in place until the mortar had completely set, which could take weeks.

It is not known when Thompson completed the bridge. It has remained intact and unaltered since its original construction, and is currently maintained by the town.

== See also ==
- List of bridges on the National Register of Historic Places in New York
- National Register of Historic Places listings in Ulster County, New York
