= Mill Street Stone Arch Bridge =

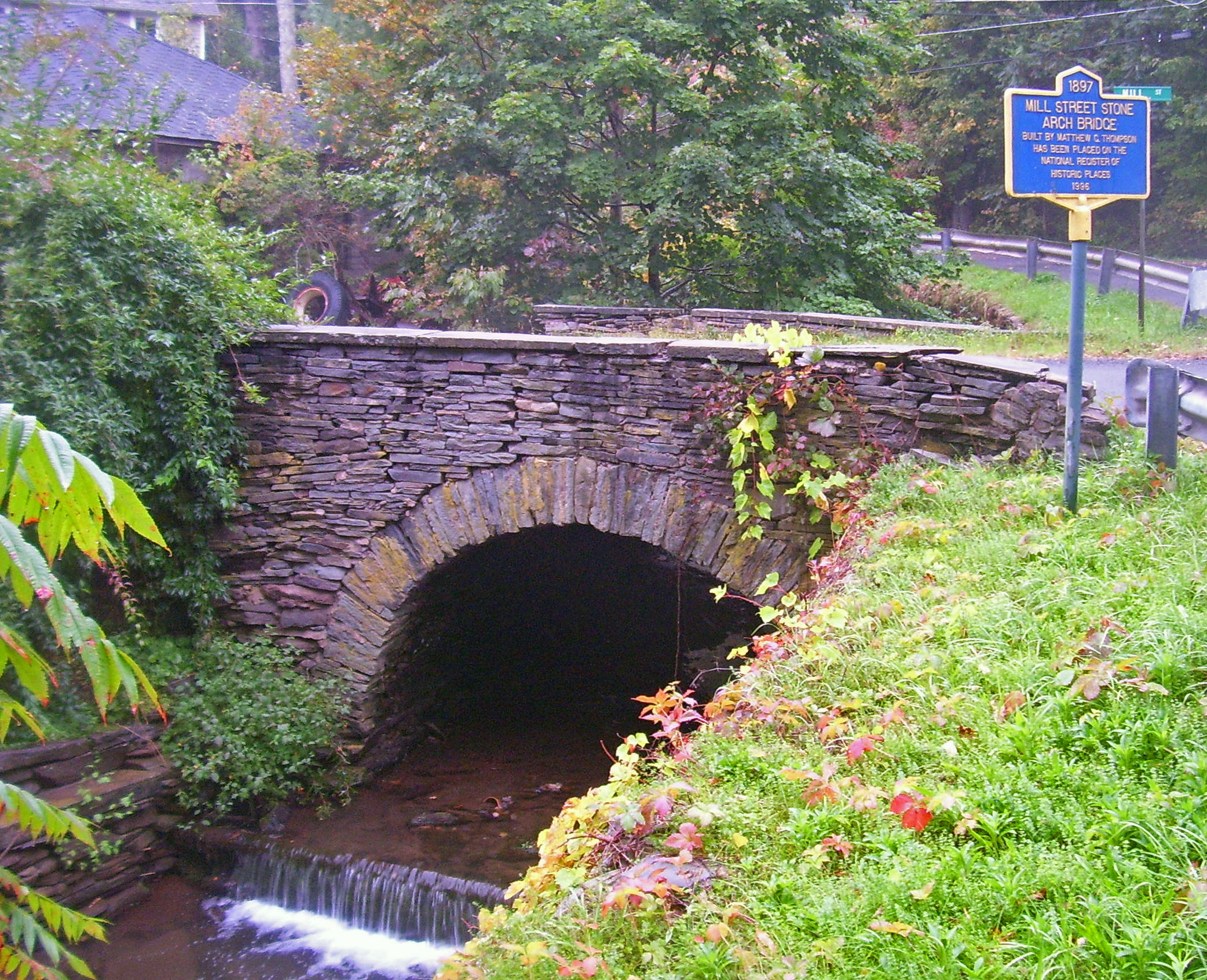
- Bridge from east, 2008
- Coordinates: 42°8′1″N 74°28′58″W
- Carries: Mill Street
- Crosses: Birch Creek
- Locale: Pine Hill, NY, USA
- Maintained by: Town of Shandaken
- Heritage status: NRHP #96001439

Characteristics
- Design: Arch bridge
- Material: Stone
- Total length: 12 feet (3.7 m)
- No. of spans: 1
- Clearance below: 7 feet (2.1 m)

History
- Constructed by: Matthew G. Thompson
- Construction end: 1897

Location
- Interactive map of Mill Street Stone Arch Bridge

The Mill Street Stone Arch Bridge is located on that street in Pine Hill, New York, United States. It is a small bridge over a local creek built around the turn of the 20th century. It is one of two stone arch bridges in the former village built by local stonemason Matthew G. Thompson. It has remained intact and in use since then, and was listed on the National Register of Historic Places in 1996. It is located in the Pine Hill Historic District.

It is located on Mill Street just south of where it splits off from Bonnie View Avenue. The bridge is 12 feet (3.7 m) in length with its arch 7 feet (2.1 m) above the creek's waters. The neighborhood is residential and wooded. It is roughly 800 feet (240 m) west of the very similar Elm Street Stone Arch Bridge.

Structurally, the bridge is a 12-foot–long (4 m) arch 7 feet (2.1 m) above the creek level, carrying the paved street. It is built of locally quarried stone using rough voussoirs with a central keystone, anchored in abutments of larger stone courses dressed to allow for tight mortar joints. The spandrel walls are of random coursed stone mortared in place.

In 1897 the Shandaken Town Board approved the construction of the two bridges in Pine Hill. Three years later it hired local mason Matthew G. Thompson to build the bridge for $208 ($7,900 in contemporary dollars). He employed construction techniques dating to the early 18th century, in which the abutments were built first on a small span, followed by a temporary wooden centering to support the arch. Its interior would be filled with earth or stone, and often waterproofed with coal tar or mortar on the inside of the stonework. On the exterior joints packed as tightly as possible prior to mortaring. The centering would be left in place until the mortar had completely set, which could take weeks.

It is not known when Thompson completed the bridge. It has remained intact and unaltered since its original construction, and is currently maintained by the town.

== See also ==
- List of bridges on the National Register of Historic Places in New York
- National Register of Historic Places listings in Ulster County, New York
