= Putnam Valley Free Library =

Library in New York, United States

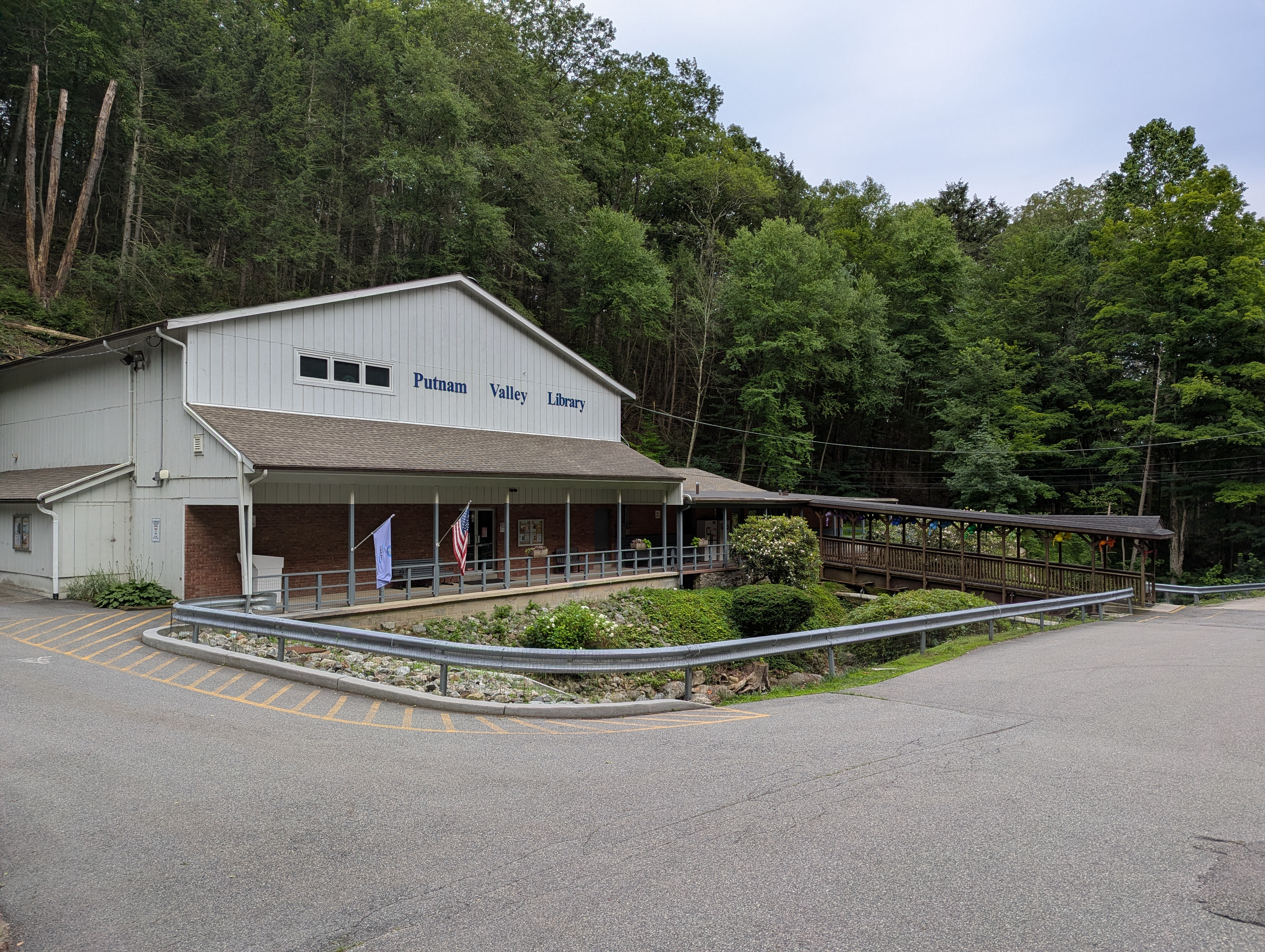
- 41°20′11″N 73°52′27″W
- Location: 30 Oscawana Lake Road, Putnam Valley, New York, U.S.
- Established: 1929; 97 years ago

Other information
- Budget: US$514,500 (2026)
- Director: Amina Chaudhry
- Website: putnamvalleylibrary.org

Putnam Valley Free Library is a library in Putnam Valley, New York. It is part of the Mid-Hudson Library System.

The library was founded informally in 1929 by Rhea Kimberly Johnson out of her kitchen. Its charter was granted by the state in 1937, but it did not have its own dedicated building until 1963. The library's permanent location on Oscawana Lake Road was acquired in 1968.

== History ==
The Putnam Valley Free Library started in 1929 as a community library within the kitchen of resident Rhea Kimberly Johnson.

In 1968, the library moved to its current location on Oscawana Lake Road. The dedication took place on May 26 and was attended by Congressman Richard Ottinger.

The library's participation in National Library Week was stunted in 1981 due to vandalism that destroyed materials, equipment, and fixtures in the building.

The library was added to the Mid-Hudson Library System's online catalogue in 2003, which allowed for online access to its resources.

Since the 2010s, changes in the library's budget have been subject to votes. The 2023 budget increase passed by only 4 votes. The library's 2019, 2025 and 2026 budget increases passed by a wider margin.

== Services ==
Aside from library resources, the Putnam Valley Free Library is a regular location for Putnam County's mobile food pantry supported by St. Mary's Church in Cold Spring in addition to a food pantry on the library's porch.

The library's events have included hosting Drag Queen Story Hour, which drew protests on site and in nearby Rye, New York, though 2020 events took place without incident.
