= Peekskill Hollow Creek =

River in New York, United States

Coordinates: 41.382°N 73.818°W

The town of Putnam Valley in New York

Peekskill Hollow Creek is a creek in central western Putnam County, New York, mainly in the town of Putnam Valley. Approximately 17 miles (27 km) in length, it originate as the outflow of Lake Tibet in the southwestern part of the town of Kent and flows southwest towards the town of Peekskill in farthest northwest Westchester County. For several miles after leaving Kent it serves as the border between the towns of Carmel and Putnam Valley.

Upon leaving Putnam Valley it enters the town of Cortlandt in Westchester County. Approaching the Hudson River it joins the confluence of two much smaller streams, the Sprout Brook and Annsville Creek, named after the latter, by which name all three enter the river after less than a mile. The creek's drainage area, which includes manmade Lake Peekskill in Putnam Valley, is slightly more than 47 square miles (120 km^{2}). There is a small dam 0.8 miles (1.3 km) upstream of its mouth at Van Cortlandtville.

In Colonial times and beyond, before Putnam County's topography was well understood and its features given names, it was thought by some that Peekskill Hollow Creek's headwaters drained from what is today's Boyds Corner Reservoir in the town of Kent one mile to Lake Tibet's east. Instead, it drains eastward into the Croton River watershed, part of the New York City water supply system.

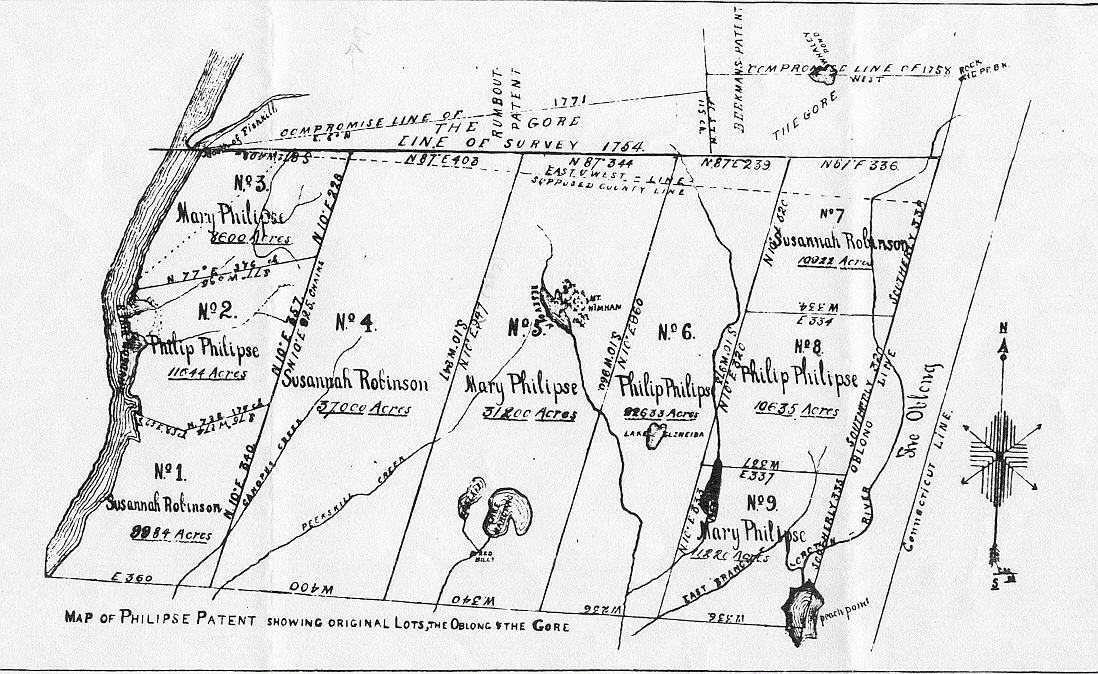
A careful examination shows Peekskill Hollow Creek's headwaters begin short of Boyds Corner Reservoir, part of the Croton River watershed, and instead head southwest towards the Hudson. The creek joins two others before emptying into the river near Peekskill
