= Lake Peekskill (lake) =

Lake in Putnam County, New York, US

- Location within New York
- Location: Putnam Valley, New York
- Coordinates: 41°20′21″N 73°52′56″W
- Type: reservoir
- Basin countries: United States
- Surface area: 58 acres (23 ha)
- Surface elevation: 88 m (289 ft)

Lake Peekskill is a small manmade lake located in the town of Putnam Valley in Putnam County, New York. Originally called Lower Cranberry Pond before being dammed, the lake was created as a destination recreational area in the 1920s by the McGolrick Co. by impounding a small unnamed tributary of Peekskill Hollow Creek with a dam on its southwest end.

Summer cottages were then built adjacent to it for sale to New York City residents, developing into the hamlet of Lake Peekskill. Today's community is mostly year-round. There are three private beaches on the lake: North Beach, Singers Beach and Carraras Beach.

Following some years when hazardous algal blooms were present, in 2019 it was reported that the recent installation of a diffuser system had ameliorated the problem. As of May 2026, there were ongoing efforts to keep the nitrogen, phosphorus, and algae under control.
