= Reed Memorial Library =

- U.S. National Register of Historic Places
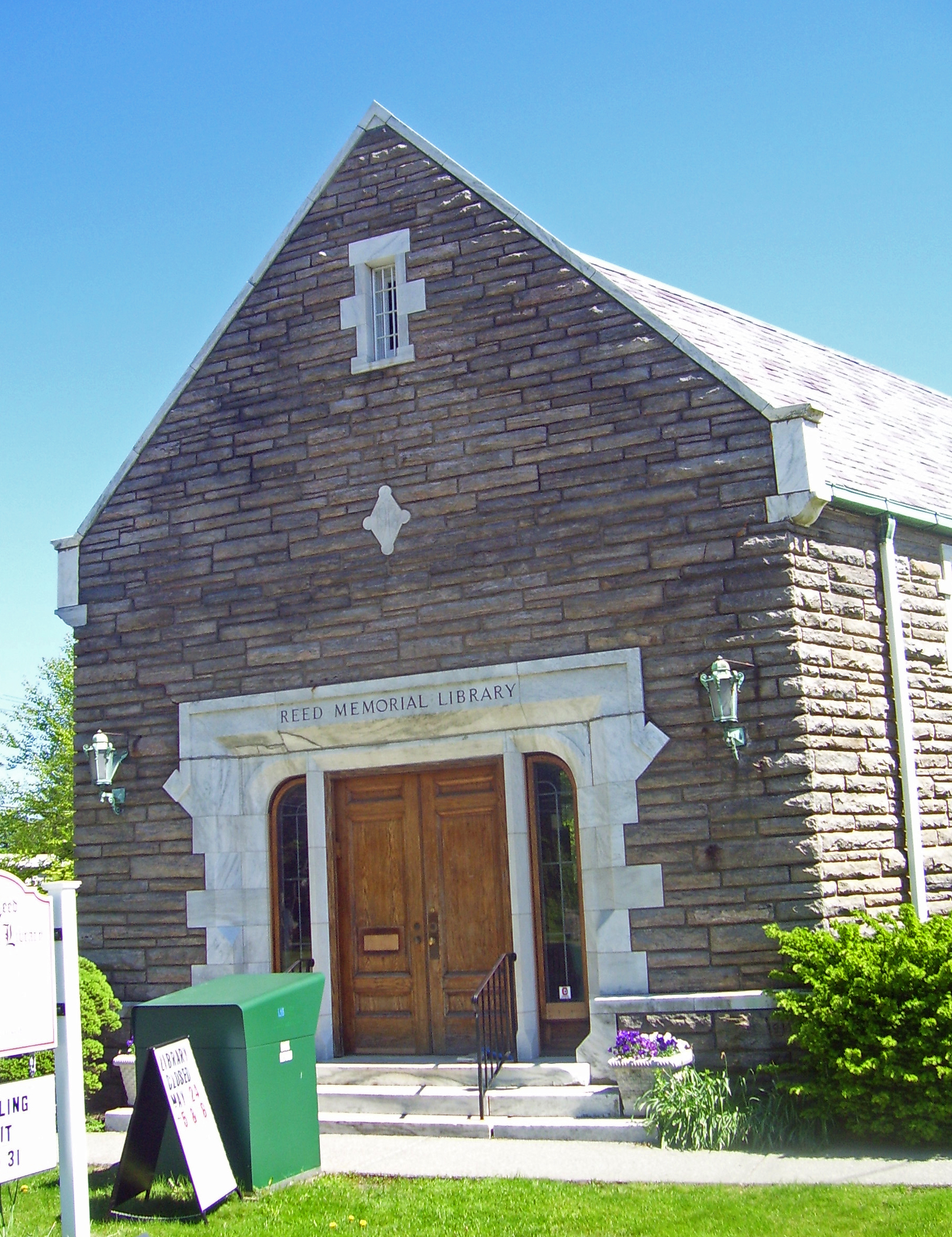
- Front entrance of library, 2008
- Location: Carmel, NY
- Nearest city: Danbury, CT
- Coordinates: 41°25′19″N 73°40′41″W
- Area: less than one acre
- Built: 1914; 112 years ago
- Architect: Miller-Reed Construction Co., Gaylor & Pryor
- Architectural style: Tudorbethan
- NRHP reference No.: 80002749
- Added to NRHP: March 28, 1980

Reed Memorial Library is located at the junction of US 6 and NY 52 in Carmel, New York, United States. It is the oldest library building in Putnam County, and was listed on the National Register of Historic Places in 1980.

It was built in 1914 by Arietta Crane Reed as a tribute to her late husband, William Belden Reed, an ardent supporter of the Literary Union of Carmel, which operates the library. It is a Tudorbethan-style building of local stone with marble accents, and much original period furnishing inside.

== Building ==
The library occupies a corner lot; it takes the form of a one-story trapezoid faced in rock quarried around nearby Lake Gilead. Its slate roof has three gables; a flat-roofed section between the two in the rear curves to form a rounded rear elevation. The main entrance has double doors flanked by narrow windows in a rusticated surround with quoined corners.

It opens into a small vestibule of tile with marble trim. Behind it is an oval lobby paneled in oak. A colonnade separates it from the reading rooms and stacks in the rounded rear section. The fireplace in the main reading room has a mantel carved in the shape of monks' heads; the one in the children's reading room is a more restrained, standard Gothic Revival style.

== History ==
Carmel had had a library since 1868, when the Carmel Library Association was formed. Its 900 volumes were first in a member's home, then a local church. This made using it difficult, so in 1881 the Literary Union of Carmel was formed to take control. They housed the books first in homes and later on the second story of a local office building.

In 1911 that space was expanded, but the library's collection was growing fast enough that it needed its own space. Two members donated the land; Arietta Crane Reed donated the money for the building in memory of her late husband, an executive with the New York City construction company Miller-Reed.

The New York firm of Pryor & Gaylor was commissioned to design a building that could not only serve as a library but a community meeting place. The irregularly-shaped structure accomplished both goals. Reed's company did the structural work; a local firm handled the masonry. Ground was broken in November 1913 and the building was opened and dedicated seven months later, at a total cost of US$45,000 ($1,446,429 2008 USD)). It has remained intact, without any alterations, ever since.

== Aesthetics ==
The library is the only significant Tudorbethan building in the Carmel area. While there are some Gothic Revival touches on the interior like the mantel in the children's reading room, the bulk of the interior shows the strong influence of the related, contemporary Arts and Crafts style, which was upholding simpler Tudorbethan buildings as an alternative to the architectural flourishes and ornament of the later Victorian era.

== See also ==
- Mid-Hudson Library System
