= District School No. 14 =

- U.S. National Register of Historic Places
- U.S. Historic district – Contributing property
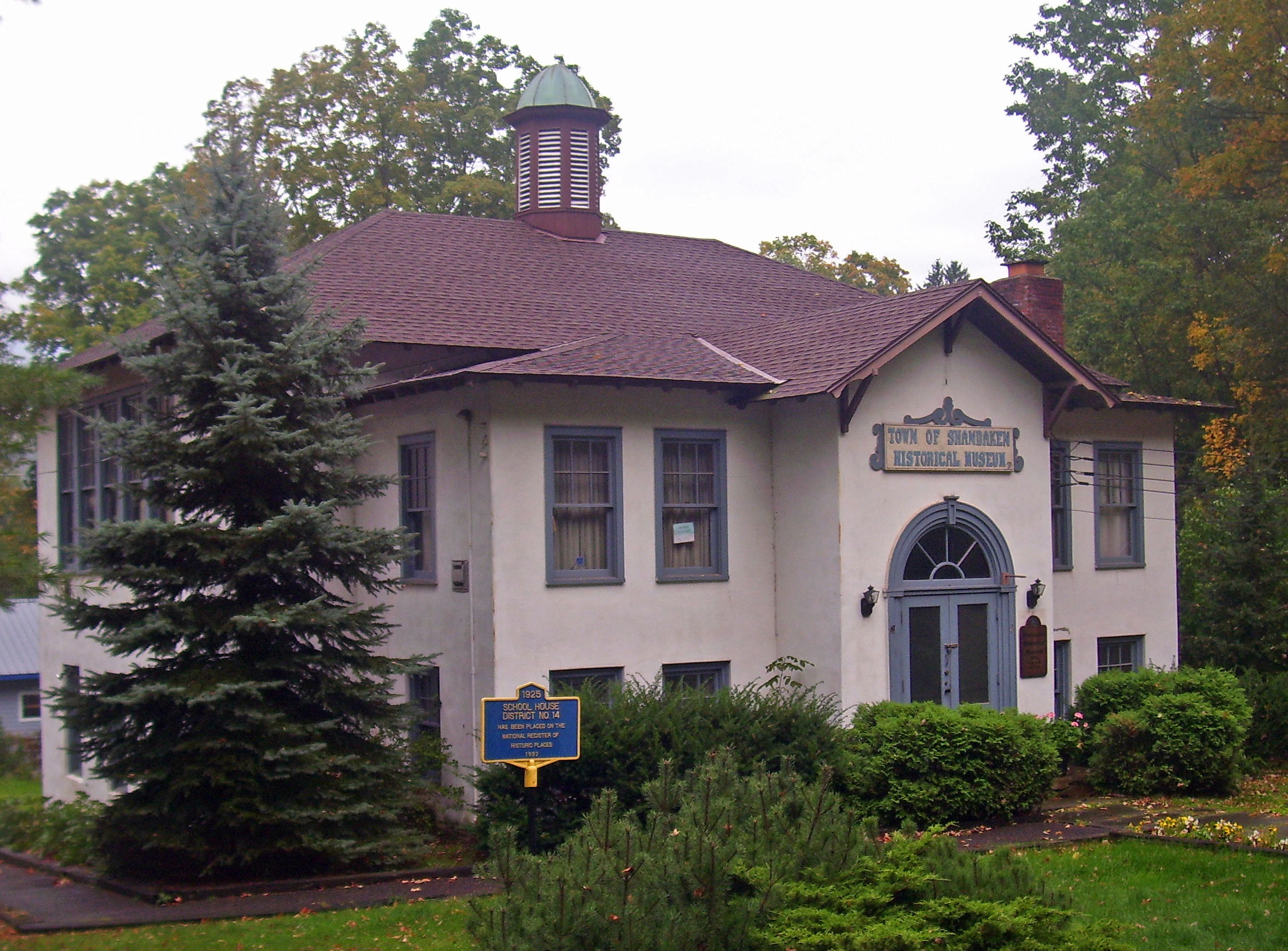
- West elevation and north profile, 2008
- Location: Academy St., south of the junction with Birch Cr. Rd., Pine Hill, NY
- Nearest city: Kingston
- Coordinates: 42°8′5″N 74°28′45″W
- Area: less than one acre
- Built: 1925
- Architectural style: Colonial Revival, American Craftsman
- NRHP reference No.: 97000111
- Added to NRHP: February 21, 1997

The former District School No. 14 building is located on Academy Street in Pine Hill, New York, United States. It is a concrete-sided frame building erected in the mid-1920s.

It replaced an 1880s school on the site that had burned down. Architecturally it combines the Colonial Revival and American Craftsman styles, both popular at the time it was built. Its interior layout also reflects changes in school building standards issued by New York's Education Department in 1910 that ended the one-room schoolhouse era in rural areas such as that section of the Catskills.

Classes were held there until 1960, when all the small local school districts in that area of western Ulster County were centralized. Afterwards it went through a variety of commercial reuses. Later it was transferred to the Town of Shandaken, which has converted it into the local historical museum known as the Town of Shandaken Historical Museum.

In 1997 the building was listed on the National Register of Historic Places. It is located in the Pine Hill Historic District.

== Building ==
The school is located on the east side of Academy Street a short distance south of state highway NY 28. The ground slopes down to the east. The neighborhood is mostly residential, with homes on lots with mature tree cover. A short distance to the southeast is the Morton Memorial Library and Elm Street Stone Arch Bridge, both also listed on the Register.

The building itself is a five-by-three-bay two-story structure on a raised concrete foundation. It is faced in flat boards covered in stucco and wire lath. The peaked roof is covered in asphalt shingles and pierced by a small octagonal belfry.

On the west (front) facade is a full-width projection a single bay deep, with a gabled central entrance bay projecting from it. Its roof has broad eaves supported by knee brackets. The rear has a projecting entrance at ground level, where the slope exposes the entire basement.

The main entrance's glazed double doors are framed in a Colonial Revival surround topped by a round-arched Palladian-style light. They open into an entrance vestibule with stairs leading to both the basement and upper story. The former, a gymnasium/auditorium, remains intact. In the latter, classroom walls have been removed to create an open space more in keeping with the building's current use. Flooring throughout the interior is the original maple tongue and groove planking. The walls and 12-foot (4 m) ceilings also retain their original plaster on lath.

== History ==
What was known at the time as the District 10 school had been on the Academy Street site since 1884, when a local resident, Richard Hill, deeded the land to the district for that purpose. That building was located on the southeast corner of the site, just east of the present building.

In the early 1920s, it burned down. The community decided to rebuild on the site. The new school would be known as the District 14 school due to administrative changes to the area's districting.

A new building was authorized in 1924. Thomas Storey, a builder from nearby Arkville, was hired for the job. He finished it in May 1925, at a cost of $23,000 ($422,000 in contemporary dollars), $3,000 over the amount originally budgeted and five months after his original expected date of completion. Classes were held in the building starting that September.

Its design combines two then-popular architectural styles. The hipped roof, belfry and entrance are hallmarks of the Colonial Revival style, while the brackets, exposed rafters, six-over-one sash windows and stucco finish are associated with the American Craftsman movement.

The building's design was also affected by new standards the state put out in 1910 for school buildings. These led many rural communities to abandon traditional one-room schoolhouses in favor of slightly larger multi-purpose buildings with several rooms that could be used for different educational purposes. They were meant to use natural lighting as much as possible, hence the high ceilings. The exterior stucco finish and interior plaster also met a new state requirement that frame structures be enclosed in incombustible material, adopted in the wake of the 1908 Collinwood school fire near Cleveland, which killed 175, most of them students.

The school stayed in use until 1960, when the small rural districts in the area were consolidated into what is today the Onteora Central School District. Four years later, the district transferred it to the then-village of Pine Hill, which used it for a while as a youth center. Later it would be used privately, serving as a coat manufacturing center and furniture repair shop. For those purposes, the walls upstairs were removed.

In 1985, when Pine Hill's residents voted to dissolve the village, title reverted to the Town of Shandaken, which eventually allowed its historical society to move in and start the museum which continues in operation. It has exhibits on all 12 of the hamlets in the town, a recreated schoolroom, and antiques.

== See also ==
- National Register of Historic Places listings in Ulster County, New York
