= Lake Peekskill, New York =

- Hamlet
- Location within New York Location within the United States
- Coordinates: 41°20′05″N 73°52′51″W
- Country: United States
- State: New York
- County: Putnam
- Elevation: 315 ft (96 m)
- Time zone: UTC-5 (Eastern (EST))
  - Summer (DST): UTC-4 (EDT)
- ZIP code: 10537
- Area code: 845
- GNIS feature ID: 954930

Lake Peekskill is a hamlet in the town of Putnam Valley in Putnam County, New York, United States, centered on Lake Peekskill. The community is 3.7 miles (6.0 km) northeast of Peekskill. Lake Peekskill has a post office with ZIP code 10537.
