= Ulster House Hotel =

- U.S. National Register of Historic Places
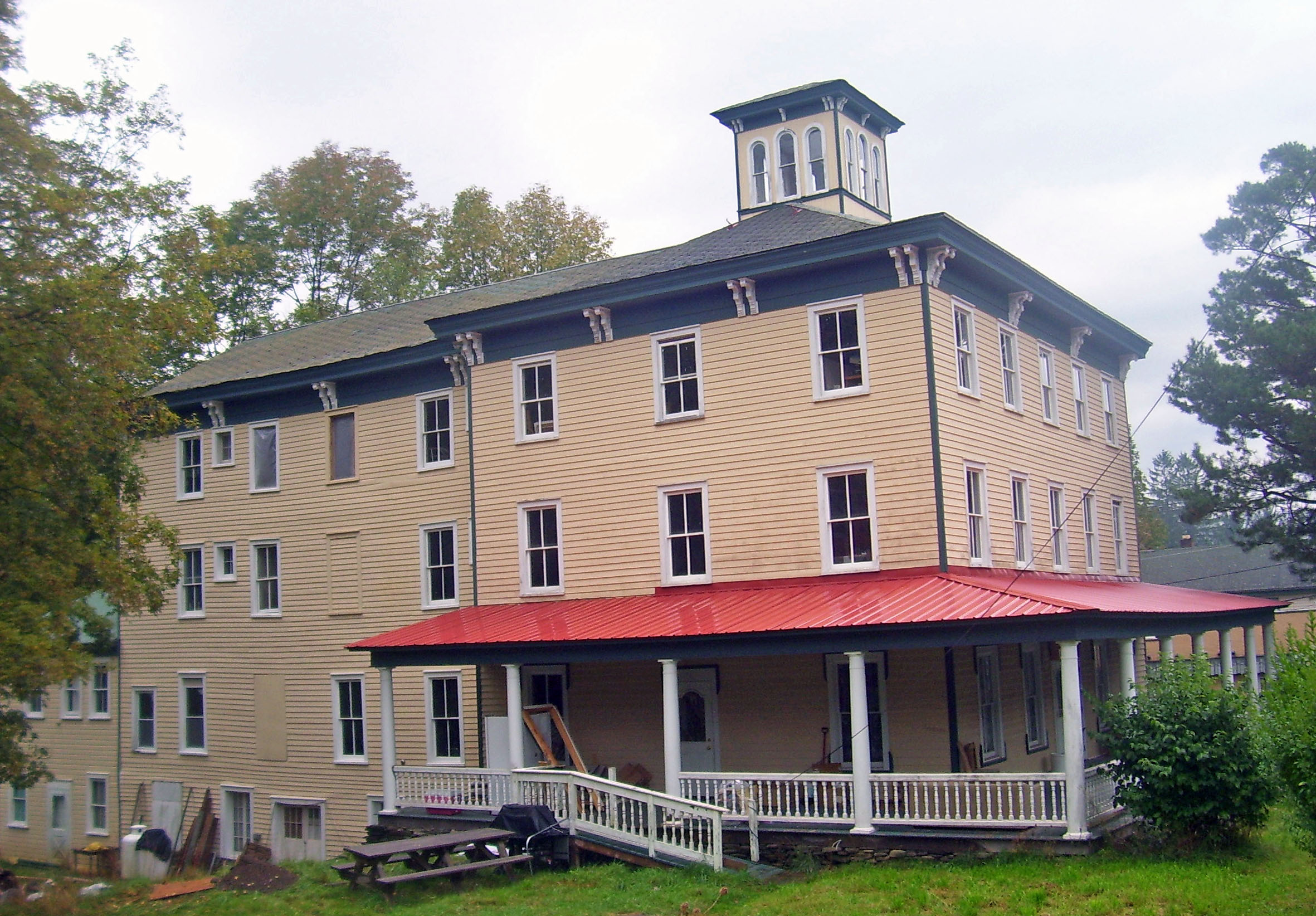
- West profile and north elevation, 2008
- Location: Pine Hill, NY
- Nearest city: Kingston
- Coordinates: 42°7′59″N 74°28′49″W
- Area: less than one acre
- Built: 1882
- Architectural style: Italianate
- NRHP reference No.: 02001399
- Added to NRHP: November 21, 2002

The Ulster House Hotel, formerly the Wellington Hotel, is located on Main Street in Pine Hill, New York, United States. It is a large wooden Italianate-style building dating to the late 19th century, currently vacant and undergoing renovations.

It is one of the few remaining hotel buildings from the peak era of Catskill resorts. In 2002 it was listed on the National Register of Historic Places.

== Building ==
The hotel is on a corner lot on the northeast of the intersection of Main and Academy streets, marking the west end of Pine Hill's small, quiet downtown. To the north and east are residential properties. The small Mosier Creek runs through the property, which slopes slightly downhill to the east.

The building itself is a three-story six-by-three-bay frame structure on a stone foundation sided in clapboard. It has a rear wing, with a similar two-story wing of later construction to the north. Both have gabled roofs with similar treatments as the main roof's asphalt-shingled low hipped roof, topped with a cupola with three narrow round-arched windows and a similar hipped roof. The slope exposes the basement along the entire rear, providing for several entrances.

A wraparound porch with metal shed roof supported by round Colonial Revival columns runs the length of the south (front) and all of the west elevations. A low spindlework rail connects them. At the roofline are broad overhanging eaves supported by brackets on a molded cornice and simple frieze.

The main entrance is in the center of the south facade. It is a pair of wood and glass paneled doors in a simple wooden surround with a toplight. It opens into a central hall with flanking parlors spanning the full depth of the main block. The moldings, wall finishes and parquet floor are original.

At the rear a door provides access to the rear wing. It has a central hall of its own and many original finishes. The second and third floors also have central halls. Like the simply decorated guest rooms, they, too, retain their original finishes.

== History ==
The small mountain town of Pine Hill became a destination for vacationers seeking the Catskills' fresh mountain air and scenic views in 1872, when the Ulster and Delaware Railroad was completed through past the village. The hotel, known then as the Wellington, was built ten years later. A 1905 railroad travel guide describes it as having 152 rooms, making it the second largest hotel on the railroad's route.

Later it fell into disuse when the Catskill resort industry declined in the mid-20th century with the rise of the automobile. It remains vacant today but intact and preserved. In 2001 a local entrepreneur bought it with the intention of reopening it as a restaurant. It is currently (2019) a private residence.

== See also ==
- National Register of Historic Places listings in Ulster County, New York
