= Morton Memorial Library (Pine Hill, New York) =

- U.S. National Register of Historic Places
- U.S. Historic district – Contributing property
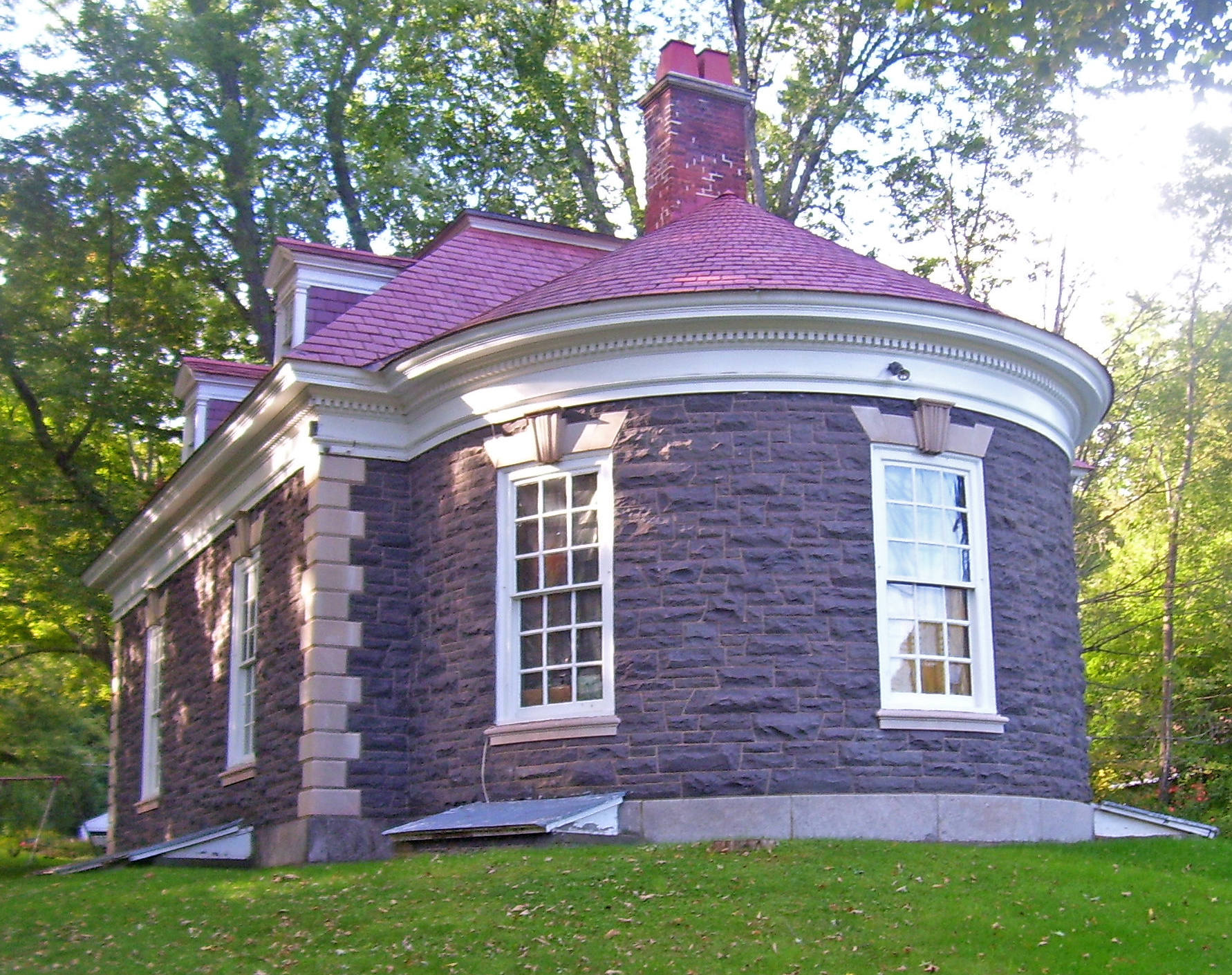
- East profile and south elevation, 2008
- Location: Elm St., southwest of NY 28, Pine Hill, NY
- Nearest city: Kingston
- Coordinates: 42°8′2″N 74°28′46″W
- Area: less than one acre
- Built: 1903
- Architectural style: Georgian Revival
- NRHP reference No.: 97000119
- Added to NRHP: February 21, 1997

Morton Memorial Library is located on Elm Street in Pine Hill, New York, United States. It is a stone building in the Georgian Revival architectural style built at the beginning of the 20th century.

It was named after a summer resident of the area who became a philanthropist later in his life. In 1997, it was listed on the National Register of Historic Places and is located in the Pine Hill Historic District.

== Building ==
The library is on the west side of Elm Street, situated on a small rise above street level in a residential neighborhood a short distance south of state highway NY 28. The ground generally slopes westward toward the divide between the Delaware and Hudson watersheds at nearby Highmount. District School No. 14, now the headquarters of the local historical society, is to the northwest. The Elm Street Stone Arch Bridge is just south along the road. Both properties are also listed on the Register.

The building is a one-and-a-half-story rectangular structure on a stone foundation, slightly exposed and faced in smooth limestone. The main exterior walls are done with stone in a rusticated ashlar pattern. Smooth limestone is also used for the keyed lintels, sills, and quoins. At the roofline is a broad frieze and denticulated cornice around the entire building. The peaked roof is surfaced in red slate, pierced by a brick chimney and two gabled dormer windows in the main block. On the east is a semicircular wing with a conical red slate roof.

Paired Ionic columns support a classical entablature over the main entrance, centrally located on the north (front) facade. Above it the roofline is enhanced with a balustrade. Three panel doors, with a rectangular light above, lead inside.

Inside, the main block is one main room with the stacks and circulation desk. A fireplace with ornate mantel is on the wall between it and the reading room, in the east wing. An iron spiral stair leads to storage space in the attic, and a bronze dedication plaque is on the west wall.

== History ==
Dr. Henry Morton was a New York City native who, while studying at the University of Pennsylvania, Dr. Morton along with two other students presented to the Philomathean society of the university the First complete English translation of the Rosetta Stone. He changed his career from law to science. He eventually became a chemistry professor and secretary of the Franklin Institute. In the 1870s he became the first president of Stevens Institute of Technology in Hoboken, New Jersey.

A decade later he purchased a cottage (this home still stands on Birch Creek Road, over a stone bridge. The home is large and grand enough to be a mansion, as many "summer cottages" actually were) in Pine Hill and began spending summers in the Catskills. He endowed a number of small local projects, primarily roads and bridges. In 1897 he bought a local building and established the community's first library, known at the time as the Birch Creek Club Library. Within a few years it had grown and he announced plans for a new building specifically to house the library.

He died in 1902, the year before it was finished. The library has had some changes to its interior layout since its construction, but generally remains a strong example of the Georgian Revival design in the Catskills region.

== See also ==
- National Register of Historic Places listings in Ulster County, New York
- Mid-Hudson Library System
