= Putnam Valley, New York =

- Town
- Town of Putnam Valley
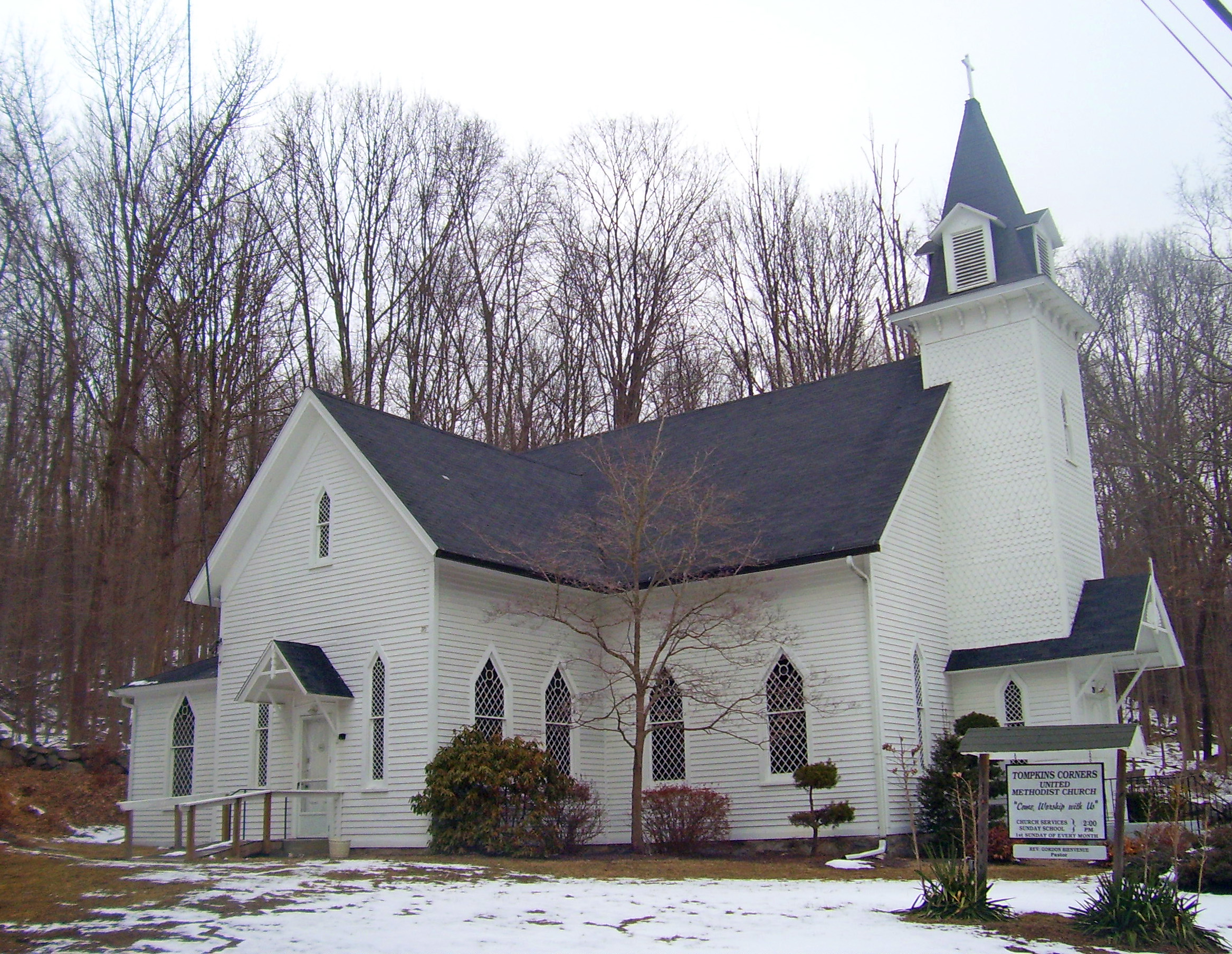
- Tompkins Corners Cultural Center in Putnam Valley

- Seal
- Nickname: Town of Lakes
- Location of Putnam Valley in New York
- Coordinates: 41°22′52″N 73°50′58″W
- Country: United States
- State: New York
- County: Putnam

Government
  - Supervisor: Alison Jolicoeur
  - Town Board: Louie Luongo; Christian Russo; Stacey Tompkins; Sherry Howard

Area
  - Total: 42.78 sq mi (110.80 km^{2})
  - Land: 41.17 sq mi (106.64 km^{2})
  - Water: 1.61 sq mi (4.16 km^{2})
- Elevation: 564 ft (172 m)

Population (2020)
  - Total: 11,747
  - Estimate (2025): 11,762
  - Density: 285.30/sq mi (110.16/km^{2})
- Time zone: UTC-5 (Eastern (EST))
  - Summer (DST): UTC-4 (EDT)
- ZIP code: 10579
- Area code: 845
- FIPS code: 36-60147
- GNIS feature ID: 0979403
- Website: https://www.putnamvalley.gov

Putnam Valley is a town in Putnam County, New York, United States. The population was 11,747 at the 2020 census. It is in the southwestern part of Putnam County and borders Westchester County to the south. Putnam Valley was incorporated in 1839, though it was settled by Dutch and English farmers some time around 1740. Prior to its settlement, the region was home to the native Wappinger Indians.

The town calls itself the "Town of Lakes". Its government consists of a four-member town board and a supervisor. The Putnam Valley Central School District provides primary education in the town up to the 12th grade. As of October 2026, there is no public transportation service within the town limits, though an on-demand microtransit service exists elsewhere in the county and is expected to include Putnam Valley some time in 2027.

== History ==
The retreating glaciers of the last ice age did much to shape the landscape of Putnam Valley, including the shearing of hills to expose springs (creating, for example, Bryant Pond) and leaving the glacial deposits of stone and large boulders. The current area of Putnam Valley was occupied by paleo-Indians, followed by the historic Wappinger Indians who lived by the many lakes. Dutch and English farmers moved into the area toward the end of the 17th Century. The influx of settlers brought disease such as smallpox to the natives, which drastically lowered the population of the Wappinger Confederacy; they numbered roughly 1,000 in 1700, and 300 by 1774.

In 1697, the Highland Patent was granted to Adolph Philipse, and he purchased a significant tract of land (extending east from Anthony's Nose to Connecticut) from the native Wappinger Indians. This land purchase was contested by Daniel Nimham and the Wappinger people until their deaths in the American Revolutionary War. The first settlers arrived circa 1740. In 1745, the Smith property was sold to the Bryant family, who renamed their pond Bryant Pond and the nearby hill, Bryant Hill. The Smith family homestead is the oldest house in Putnam Valley, located just east of the Taconic Parkway on Bryant Pond Road.

Putnam Valley incorporated in 1839 as the town of Quincy, when it was separated from the town of Philipstown, and it took the name "Putnam Valley" in 1840, possibly because local inhabitants were not favorably impressed by John Quincy Adams.

In 1861, a small part of the town of Carmel was added to Putnam Valley.

== Geography ==
According to the United States Census Bureau, the town has a total area of 43.0 square miles (111 km^{2}), of which 41.4 square miles (107 km^{2}) is land and 1.6 square miles (4.1 km^{2}), or 3.72%, is water. A total of 14,089 acres of Clarence Fahnestock State Park lie within the boundaries of Putnam Valley, and 1,000 acres are owned by the Hudson Highlands Land Trust, an environmental preservation trust in the Hudson Valley.

The southern town line is the border of Westchester County.

The Taconic State Parkway passes through the eastern part of the town. New York State Route 301 straddles the town's northern border.

== Demographics ==
Historical population
Census	Pop.	Note	%±
1840	1,659		—
1850	1,626		−2.0%
1860	1,587		−2.4%
1870	1,566		−1.3%
1880	1,555		−0.7%
1890	1,193		−23.3%
1900	1,034		−13.3%
1910	924		−10.6%
1920	704		−23.8%
1930	859		22.0%
1940	1,187		38.2%
1950	1,908		60.7%
1960	3,070		60.9%
1970	5,209		69.7%
1980	8,994		72.7%
1990	9,094		1.1%
2000	10,686		17.5%
2010	11,809		10.5%
2020	11,747		−0.5%
2025 (est.)	11,762		0.1%
U.S. Decennial Census

At the 2000 census, there were 10,686 people, 3,676 households and 2,874 families residing in the town. The population density was 258.2 inhabitants per square mile (99.7/km^{2}). There were 4,253 housing units at an average density of 102.7 per square mile (39.7/km^{2}). The racial makeup of the town was 94.54% White, 1.60% African American, 0.19% Native American, 0.85% Asian, 1.28% from other races, and 1.53% from two or more races. Hispanic or Latino of any race were 6.28% of the population.

There were 3,676 households, of which 39.4% had children under the age of 18 living with them, 67.1% were married couples living together, 8.0% had a female householder with no husband present, and 21.8% were non-families. 17.1% of all households were made up of individuals, and 4.8% had someone living alone who was 65 years of age or older. The average household size was 2.89 and the average family size was 3.28.

Age distribution was 26.7% under the age of 18, 6.0% from 18 to 24, 31.5% from 25 to 44, 27.1% from 45 to 64, and 8.7% who were 65 years of age or older. The median age was 38 years. For every 100 females, there were 99.3 males. For every 100 females age 18 and over, there were 98.2 males.

The median household income was $72,938, and the median family income was $82,576. Males had a median income of $56,976 versus $36,875 for females. The per capita income for the town was $31,215. About 2.7% of families and 4.8% of the population were below the poverty line, including 6.4% of those under age 18 and 1.7% of those age 65 or over.

== Education ==
The Putnam Valley Central School District operates three schools: Putnam Valley Elementary School starting at kindergarten, Putnam Valley Middle School starting at 5th grade, and Putnam Valley High School starting at 9th grade. The district was created in 1934, and was dedicated in 1935. The high school is the most recent addition to the district, being built in 2000. It shares a campus with the middle school and uses geothermal energy for heating and cooling, has three computer labs, a performing arts center and wireless Internet access in all classrooms. Before the high school was built, Putnam Valley students were previously sent to neighboring town high schools including Lakeland High School in Shrub Oak, Peekskill High School or Walter Panas High School, all of which are in Westchester County.

== Transportation ==
Rail service is provided by Metro-North's Hudson Line at the Peekskill station in Westchester County, which is a 15 minute drive southwest from Putnam Valley. There are no regular public bus routes in the town, though an on-demand microtransit service in Putnam County is expected to expand to include Putnam Valley locations in 2027.

== Government ==
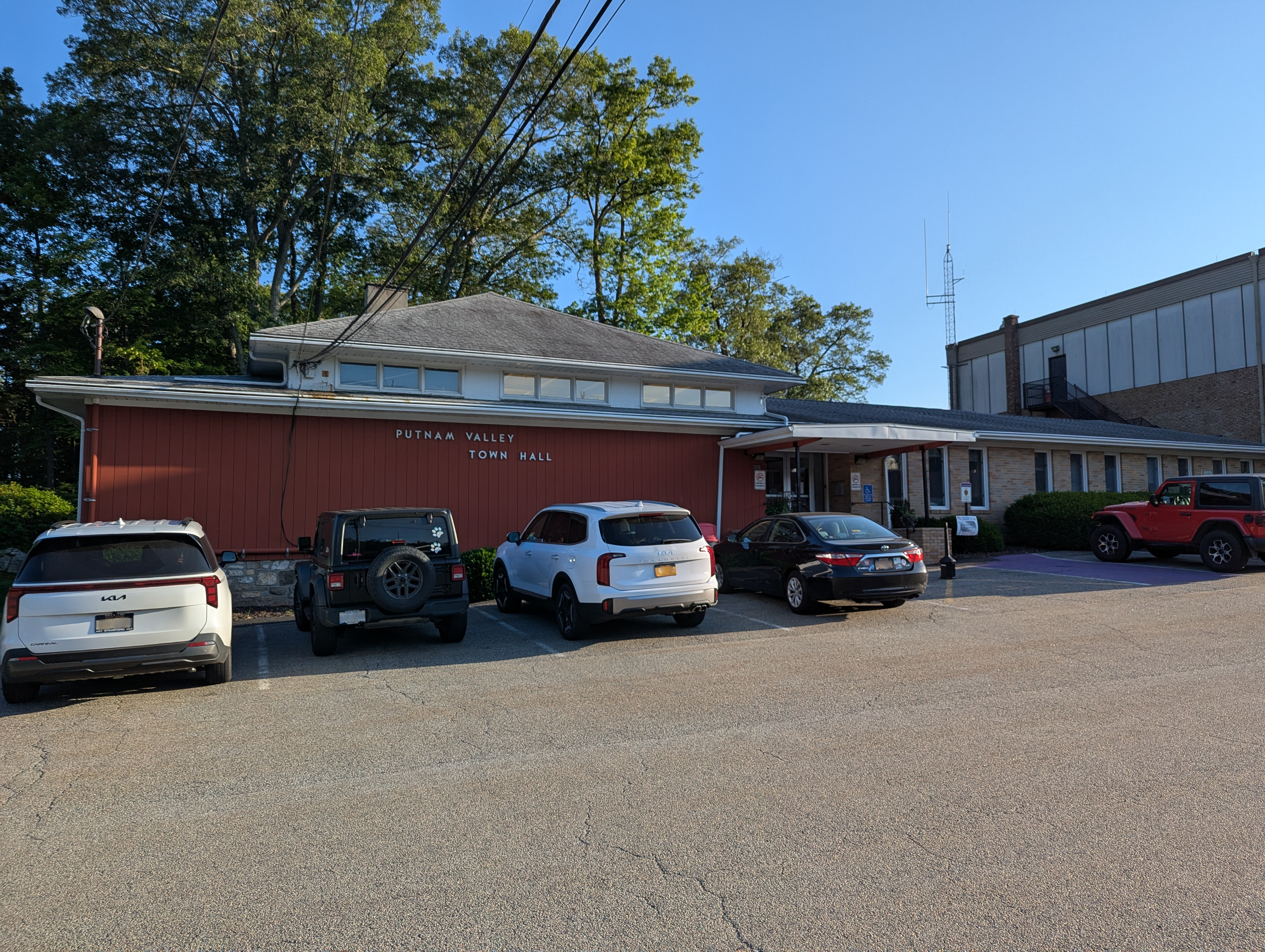
The town hall in June 2025

The Town of Putnam Valley is governed by a town board. The town board consists of a Supervisor, Alison Jolicoeur, and four town board members: Louie Luongo, Christian Russo, Stacey Tompkins and Sherry Howard. Jolicoeur, a Democrat, was elected by a 23-vote margin in 2025. The town hall is located at 265 Oscawana Lake Road. Law enforcement services for Putnam Valley are provided by the New York State Police and the Putnam County Sheriff's Department. Fire protection is provided by the Putnam Valley Volunteer Fire Department, and medical emergencies are served by Putnam Valley Ambulance Corp Volunteers.

== Communities and locations in Putnam Valley ==
- Adams Corners – A hamlet in the southeastern part of the town.
- Amen Hill – A hill inside the Putnam Valley Park, known for its steep slope.
- Appalachian Trail – The Appalachian Trail runs through the town of Putnam Valley.
- Bullet Hole – A hamlet by the eastern town line.
- California Hill State Forest
- Christian Corners – A hamlet north of Oscawana Lake.
- Clarence Fahnestock State Park – A state park partly in the northern part of the town.
- Crofts Corners – A hamlet in the southern half of the town.
- Dennytown Lake – Historic lake in the hamlet of Dennytown.
- Dennytown – A hamlet near the western town line.
- Floradan Estates – A privately owned cooperative community located just south of the Town Park.
- Gilbert Corners – A hamlet west of Oscawana Lake.
- Lake Peekskill – A hamlet near the southern town line that includes a small body of water called Lake Peekskill and the Putnam Valley Free Library.
- Oscawana Corners – A hamlet south of Oscawana Lake.
- Oscawana Lake – A lake in the center of the town.
- Putnam Valley Town Park – A town park primarily in the southern part of town.
- Roaring Brook Lake – A hamlet around Roaring Brook Lake, east of the Taconic State Parkway.
- Roaring Brook – A historic stream running through the town and across the Taconic State Parkway. Flows into Roaring Brook Lake.
- Sunnybrook – A hamlet by the southwestern shore of Oscawanna Lake.
- Three Arrows Cooperative Society – A cooperative colony near Shrub Oak.
- Tompkins Corners – A hamlet in the eastern part of the town. The United Methodist Church there, since closed, is the only building in town listed on the National Register of Historic Places. It was sold in 2014 and became home to the Tompkins Corners Cultural Center (TCCC), a non-profit organization founded by local community members to foster the arts.
