= Pine Hill, New York =

Pine Hill
- CDP and hamlet
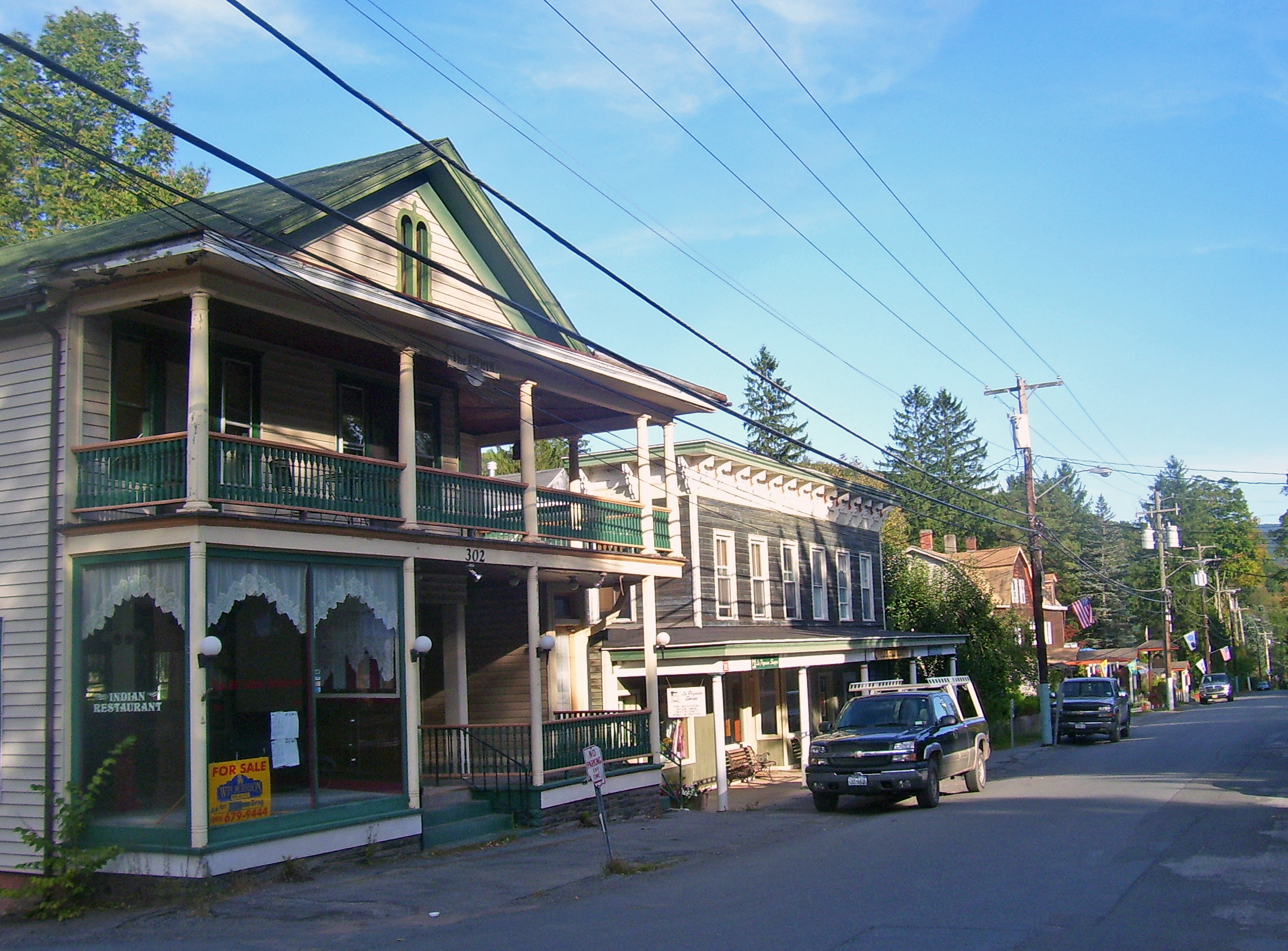
- Main Street in Pine Hill

- Location in Ulster County and the state of New York.
- Coordinates: 42°8′3″N 74°28′41″W
- Country: United States
- State: New York
- Region: Catskills
- County: Ulster
- Incorporated: 1895

Area
  - Total: 2.08 sq mi (5.40 km^{2})
  - Land: 2.08 sq mi (5.38 km^{2})
  - Water: 0.012 sq mi (0.03 km^{2})
- Elevation: 1,499 ft (457 m)

Population (2020)
  - Total: 275
  - Density: 132.5/sq mi (51.16/km^{2})
- Time zone: UTC−5 (EST)
  - Summer (DST): UTC−4 (EDT)
- ZIP Code: 12465
- Area code: 845
- FIPS code: 36-58057

Pine Hill is a hamlet (and census-designated place) in the western part of the town of Shandaken in Ulster County, New York, United States. As of the 2020 census, the CDP had a total population of 275.

== History ==
Pine Hill became an important tourist community when the Ulster and Delaware Railroad reached it in 1872. It was known as the "Saratoga" of the Catskills due to the local Crystal Springs bottling company. In 1895, Pine Hill became an incorporated village, but the village voted to dissolve its incorporation in 1985, becoming an unincorporated entity (hamlet).

The District School No. 14, Elm Street Stone Arch Bridge, Mill Street Stone Arch Bridge, Morton Memorial Library, Pine Hill Historic District, and Ulster House Hotel are listed on the National Register of Historic Places.

== Geography ==
According to the United States Census Bureau, the CDP has a total area of 2.1 square miles (5.4 km^{2}), of which 5.5 km^{2} (2.1 sq mi) is land and 0.47% is water.

The community is inside the Catskill Park.

== Demographics ==
Historical population
Census	Pop.	Note	%±
2010	275		—
2020	275		0.0%
U.S. Decennial Census

As of the census of 2010, there were 275 people comprising 149 households in the CDP. The population density was 130 inhabitants per square mile (50/km^{2}). There were 330 housing units at an average density of 157 units per square mile (61 units/km^{2}). The racial makeup of the CDP was 91.6% White, 1.5% African American, 0.4% Native American, 0.40% Asian, 5.1% from other races, and 1.1% from two or more races. Hispanic or Latino of any race were 9.0% of the population.

There were 149 households, out of which 29.0% had children under the age of 18 living with them, 46.3% were married couples living together, 14.8% had a female householder with no husband present, and 53.7% were non-families. 43.6% of all households were made up of individuals. The average household size was 1.85 and the average family size was 2.52.

In the CDP, the population was spread out, with 12.4% under the age of 18, 5.1% from 18 to 24, 20.4% from 25 to 44, 34.9% from 45 to 64, and 27.3% who were 65 years of age or older. The median age was 52.6 years. For every 100 females, there were 100 males.

The median income for a household in the CDP was $42,969.

== Education ==
The school district is Onteora Central School District.

== Gallery ==
Historic and historically notable buildings and structures in Pine Hill
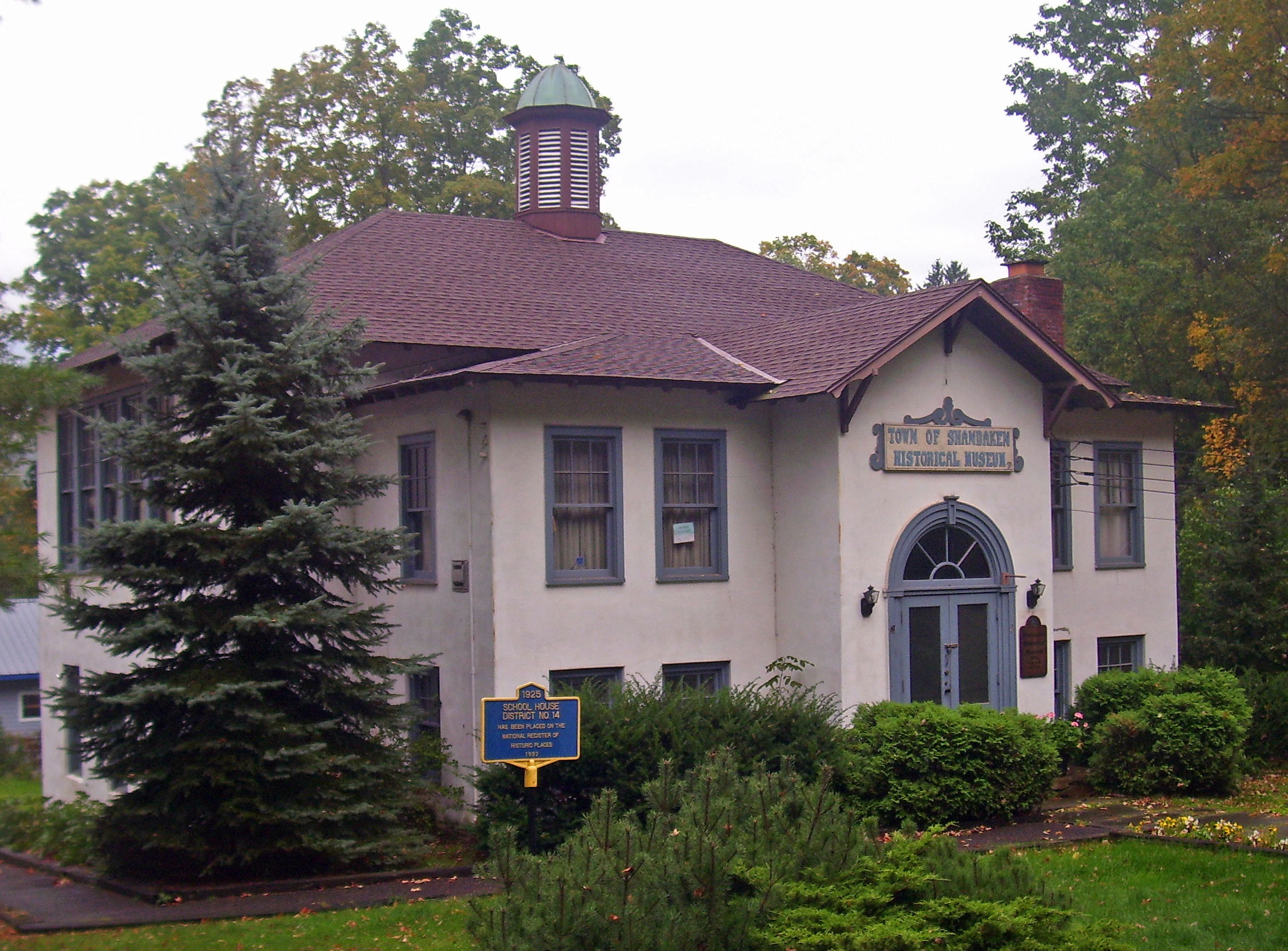
District School Number 14

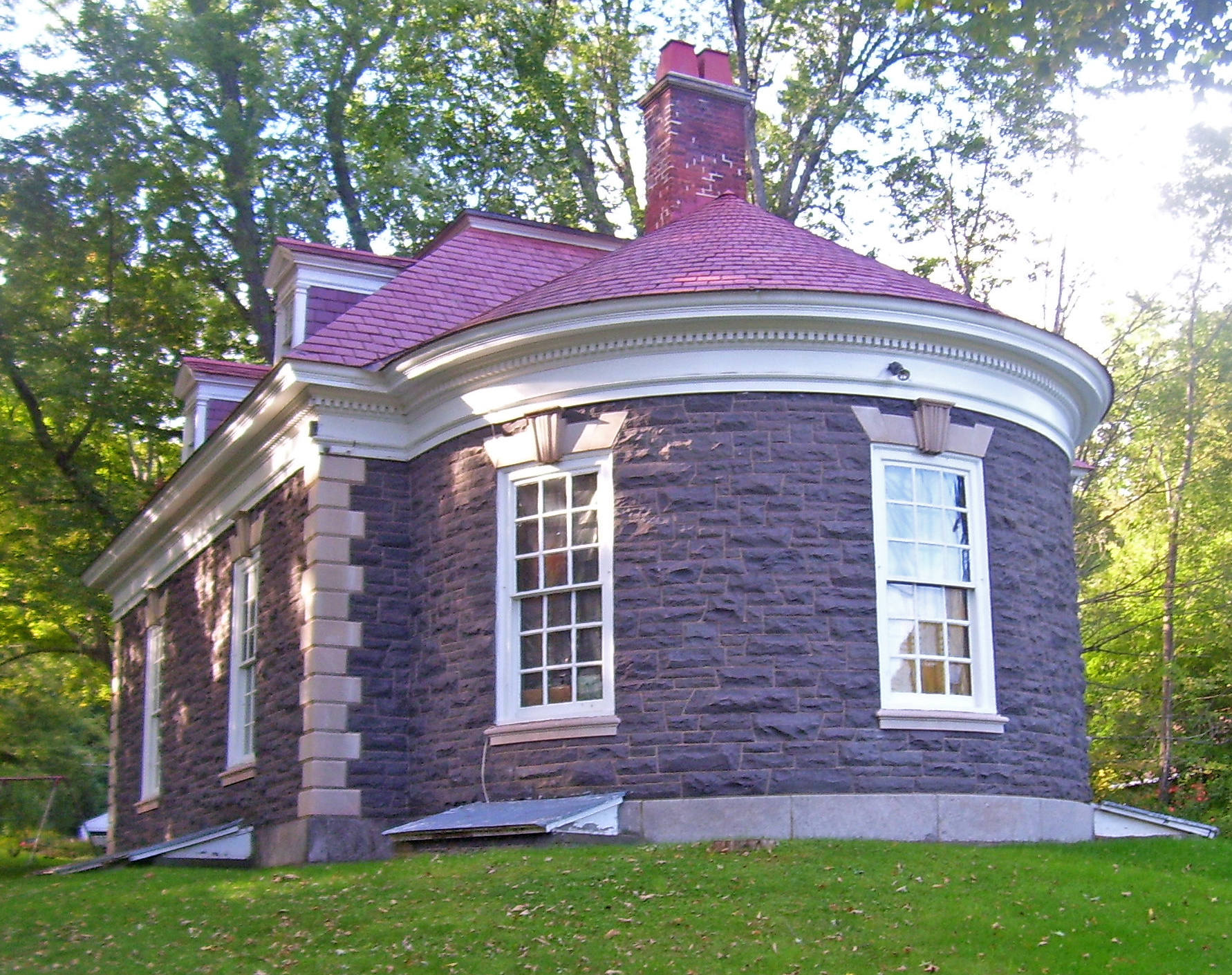
Morton Memorial Library

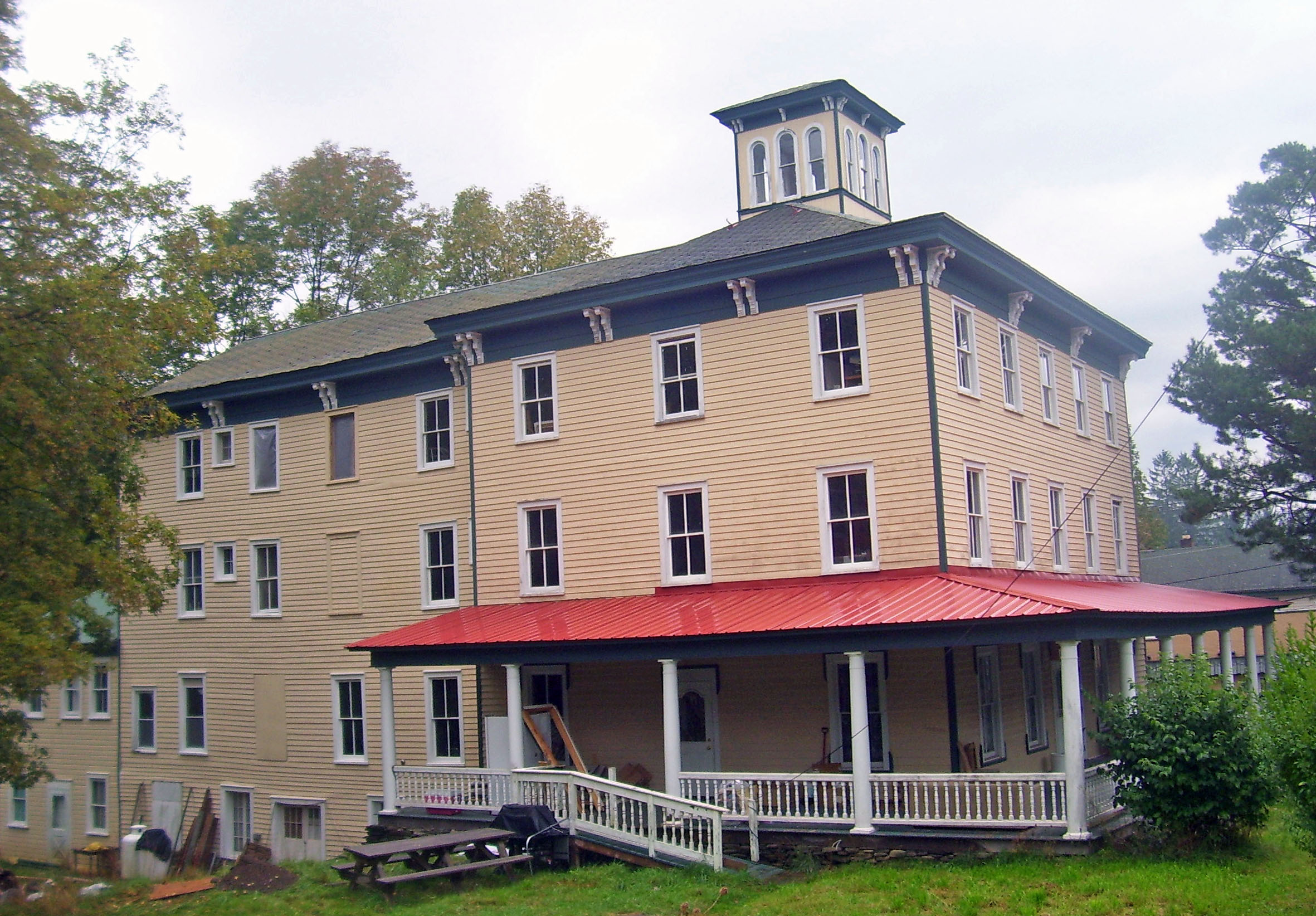
Ulster House Hotel (now private residence)

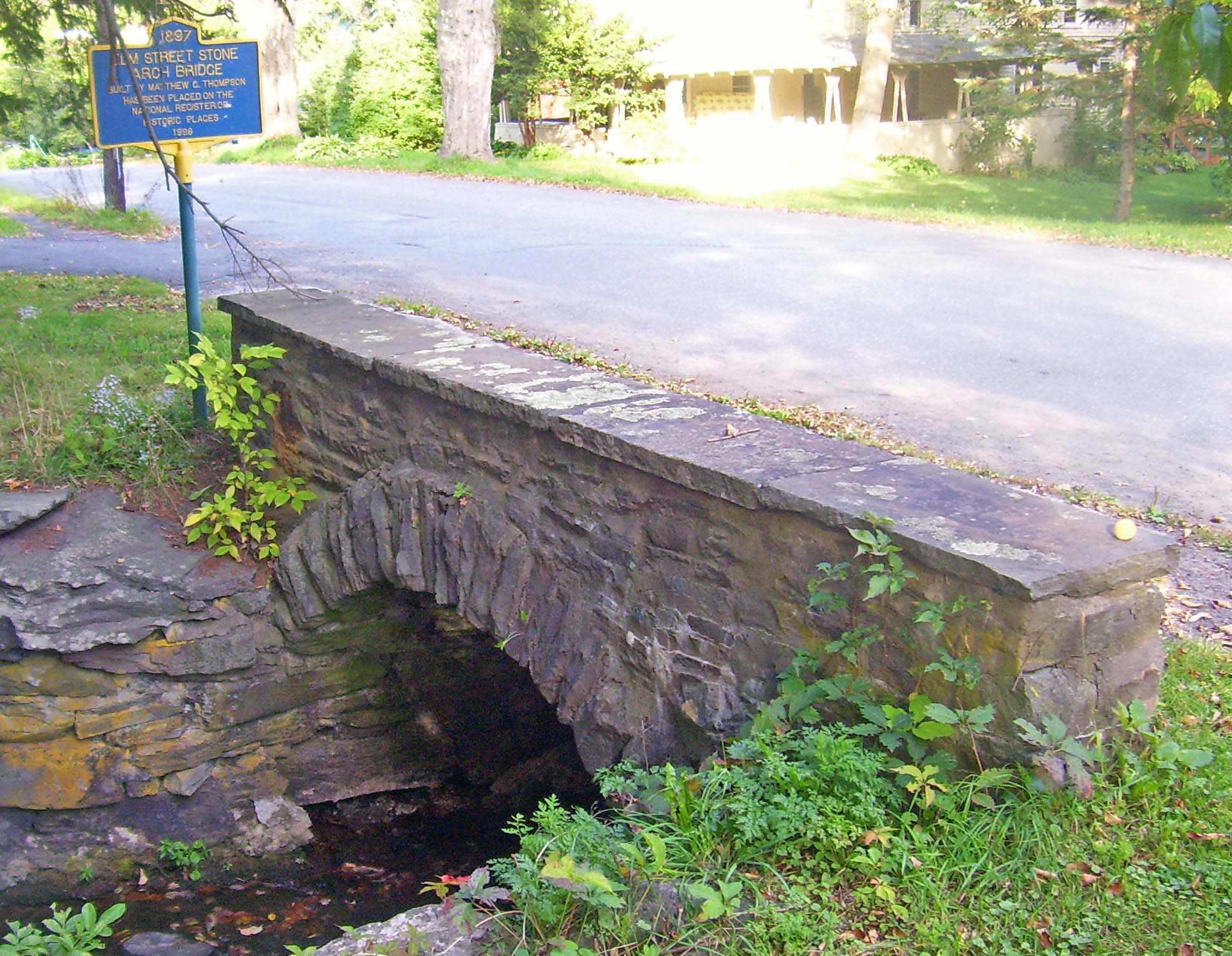
Elm Street Stone Arch Bridge

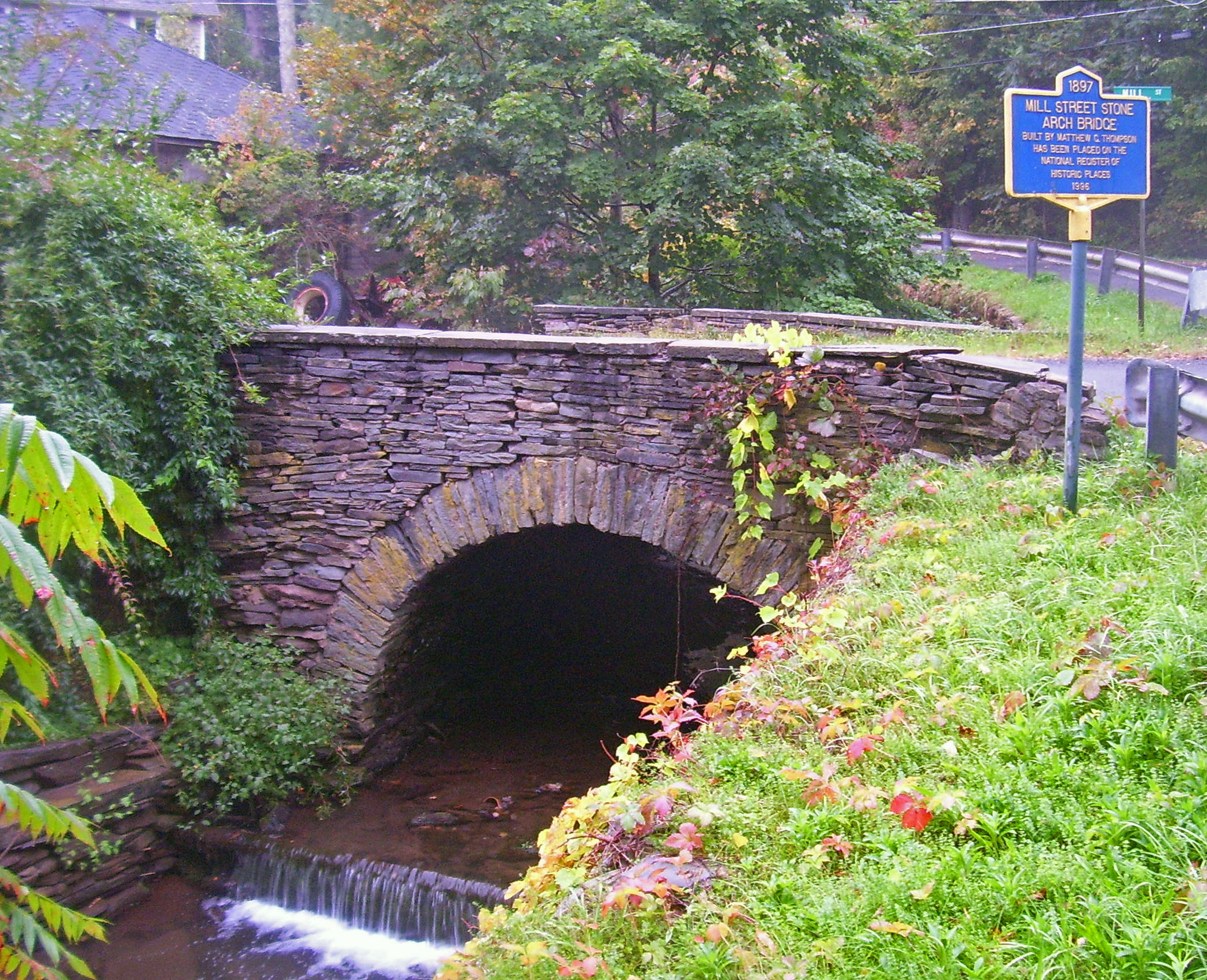
Mill Street Stone Arch Bridge

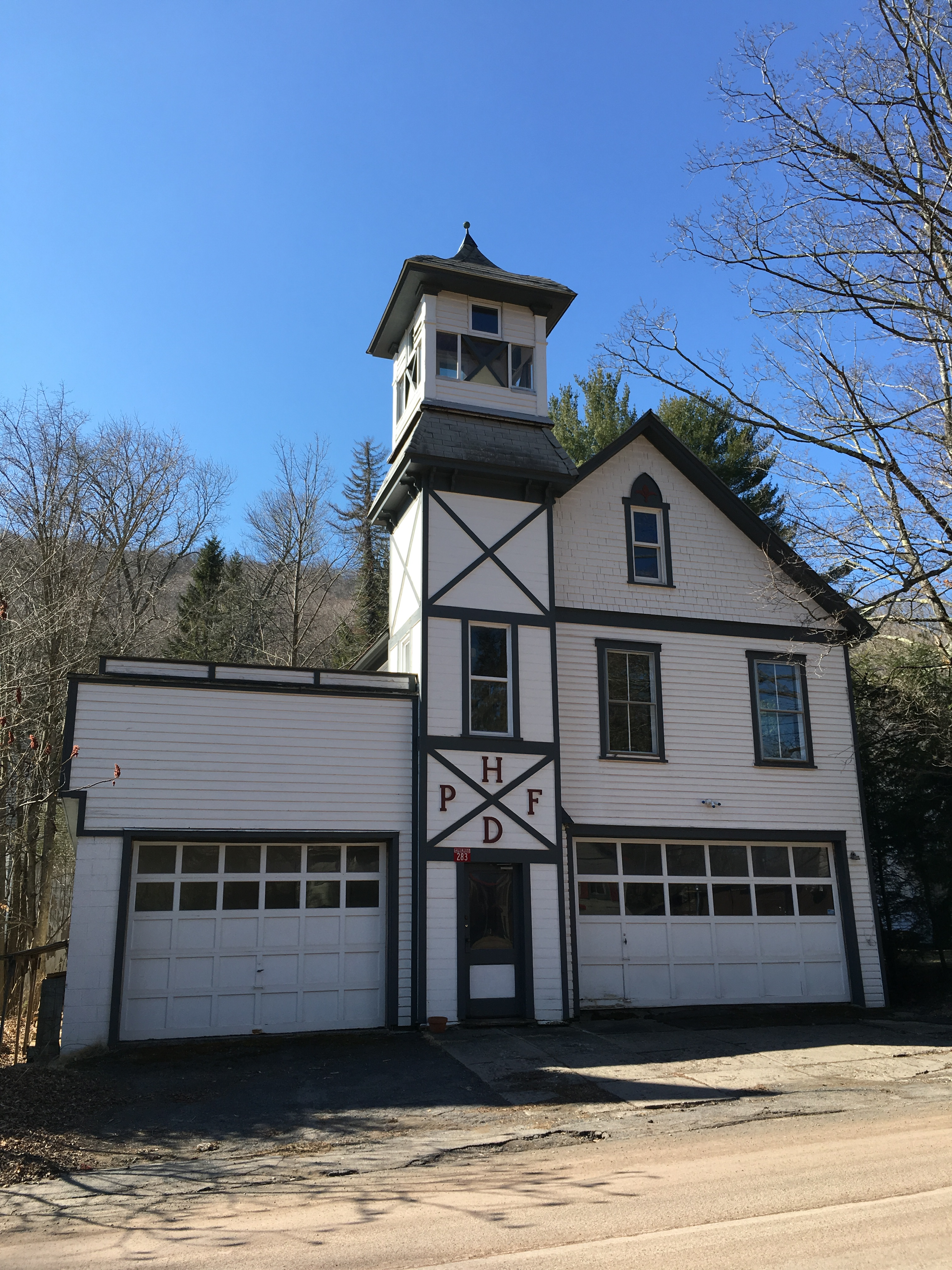
Pine Hill Fire Department (now private residence)

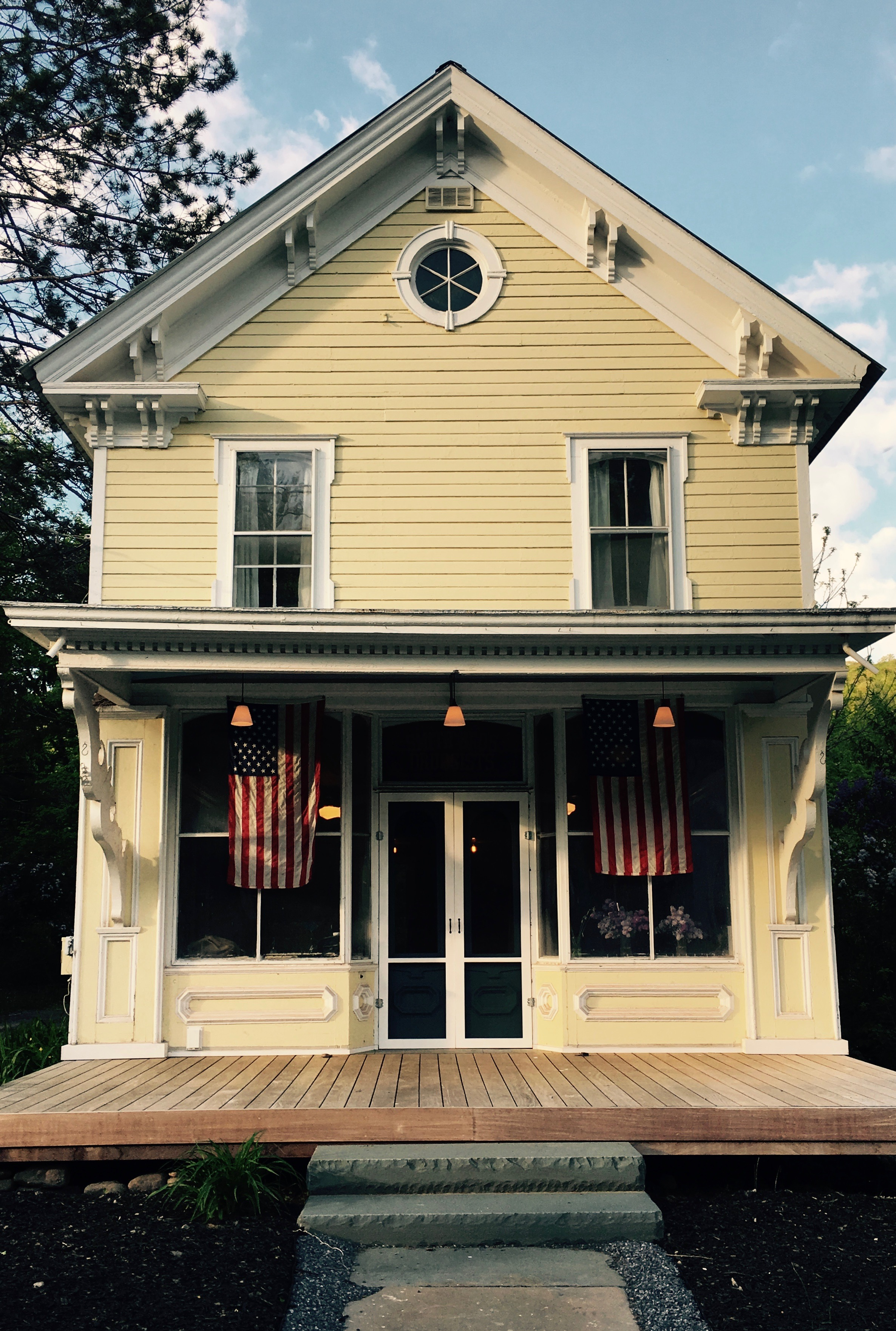
Smith Brothers Druggists

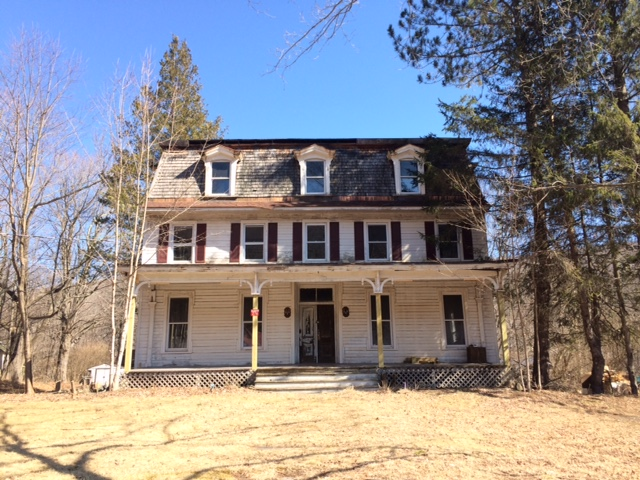
Orchard Park House

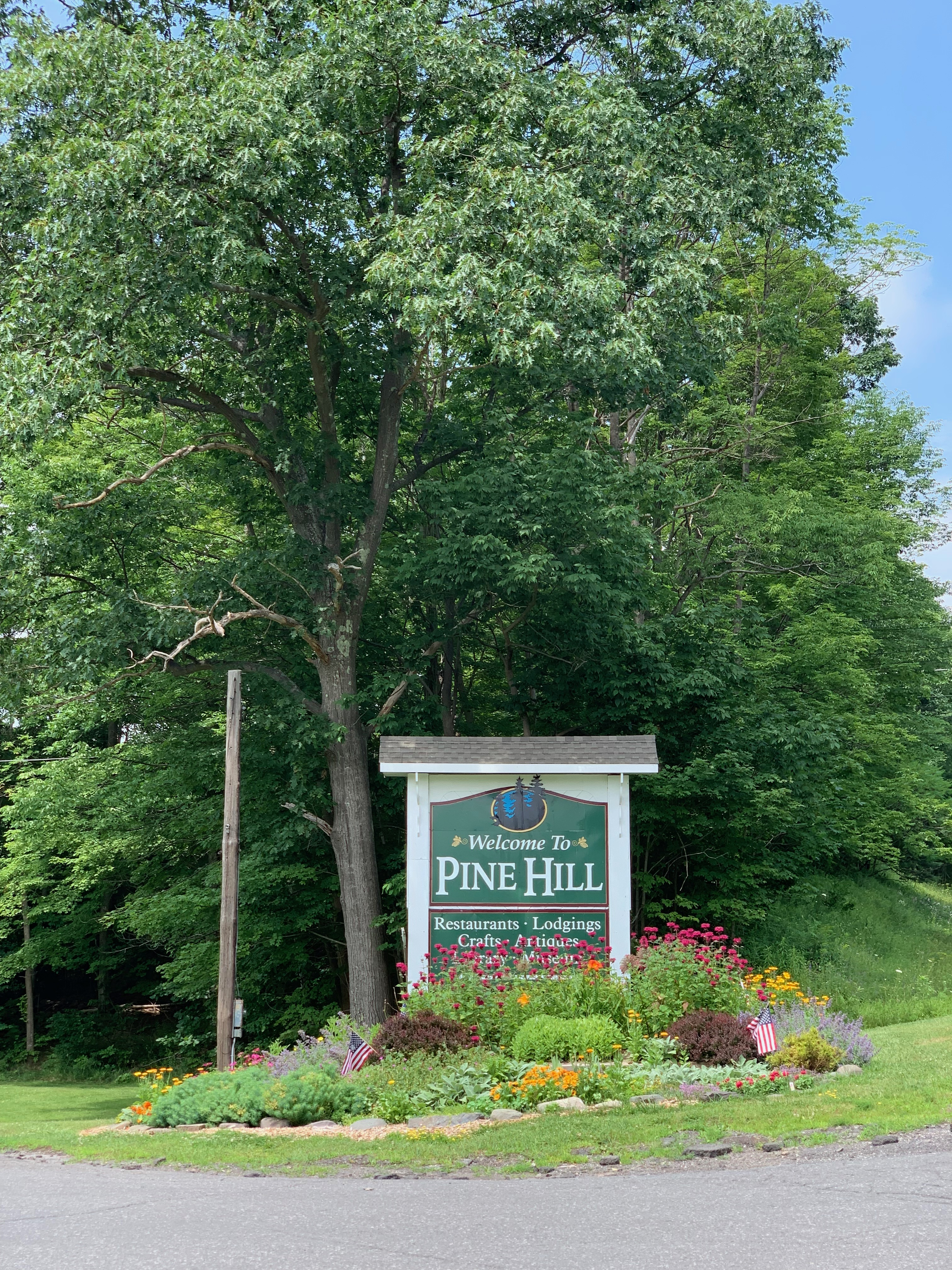
Main entrance sign and garden
Original building names are used. Many have since changed use.
