= Croton River watershed =

Drainage basin in New York, US

Coordinates: 41°11′1.34″N 73°52′46.49″W

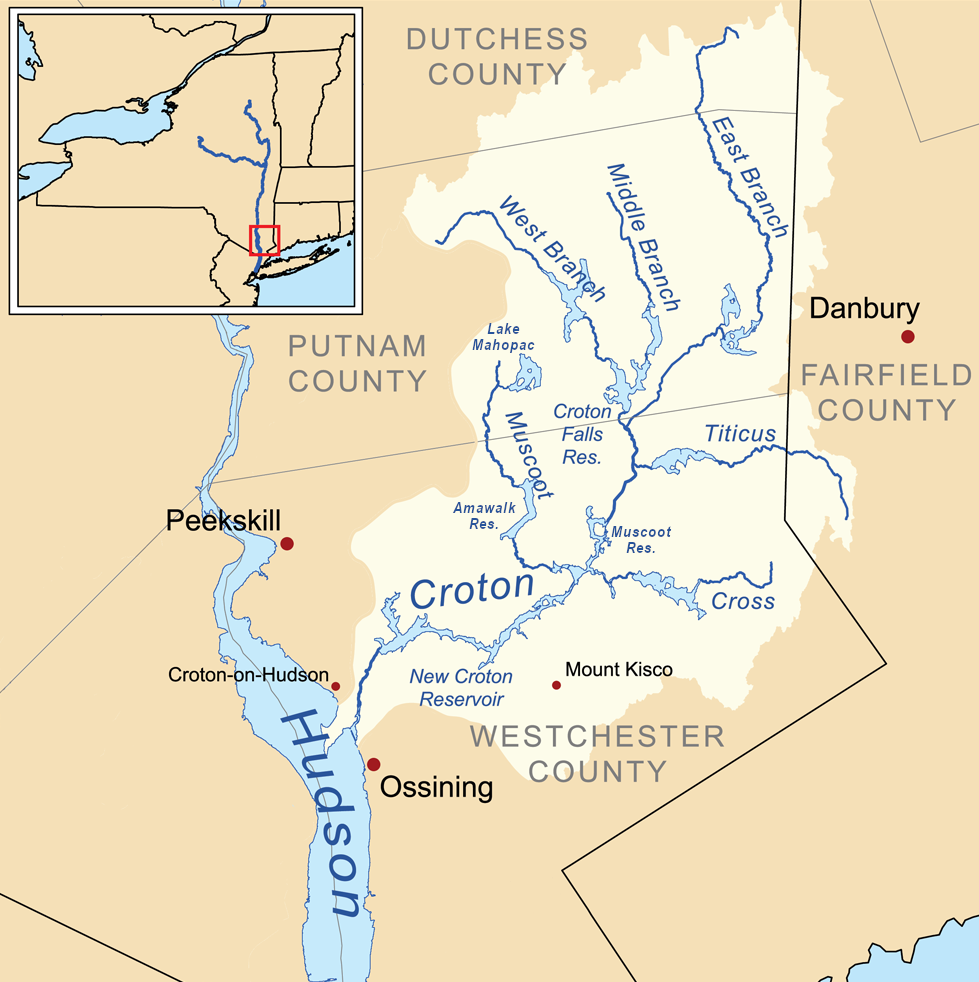
Map of the Croton River watershed. Note that this is not identical with the New York City water supply system's engineered Croton Watershed. (Note: The land areas are the same, but their drainages are not. Numerous small natural lakes and ponds, as well as large Lake Mahopac, are within the river's watershed but not a direct part of the NYC water supply system. They are not owned or maintained by the New York City watershed system, but ultimately drain into it; Lake Mahopac, which features a sluice gate at its extreme southwestern corner, is an auxiliary water source for the New York City system: according to Title 24 (Environmental Protection and Utilities) of the New York City Administrative Code, Chapter 3 (Water Supply), Subchapter 1 (Water Supply to the City of New York), Section 24-328 (Lake Mahopac; level of water not reduced): "Nothing in this chapter contained shall authorize, empower or permit any water in excess of its ordinary flow to be drawn from Lake Mahopac, in the town of Carmel, Putnam county, between the first days of March and September in any year." Drawing on the Lake between September 2nd and the last day of February in any given year is not therein proscribed. * The Croton Watershed, the New York City water supply system's term for its southernmost watershed area, also includes the physical infrastructure of dams, spillways, tunnels, pumps, and related mechanical components. * A map of the actual Croton Watershed is found here.)

The Croton River watershed is the drainage basin of the Croton River and its seven tributary rivers, a hydrological feature in far southeastern New York State. Spanning large swaths of Putnam and Westchester counties, it is over 350 square miles (910 km^{2}) in area and holds some 115 billion US gallons (440,000,000 m^{3}) of fresh water. (Note: 15 billion US gallons (57,000,000 m^{3}) in freshwater lakes and ponds, 86.6 billion US gallons (328,000,000 m^{3}) in reservoirs, roughly 5.5 billion US gallons (21,000,000 m^{3}) in controlled lakes, and 7.5 billion US gallons (28,000,000 m^{3}) in its river system.)

Largely physically overlapping the New York City water supply system's engineered Croton Watershed, the Croton River watershed represents the drainage and flow of some seven rivers, one dozen reservoirs, three controlled lakes, Lake Mahopac, and countless smaller lakes and ponds.

The vast majority of the Croton River watershed water (Note: Less that from the drainage basins of the Boyds Corner Reservoir and the West Branch Reservoir, which are mixed with the flow of the NYC system's Delaware Aqueduct supply in West Branch and carried on by it to the Kensico Reservoir) ends up in the New Croton Reservoir, then is taken via the New Croton Aqueduct to the Jerome Park Reservoir in the Bronx, from which it is distributed to New York City. Water in excess of the city's needs spills over the New Croton Dam at the New Croton Reservoir and is carried by the Croton River into the Hudson River at Croton-on-Hudson, New York, about 30 miles north of the Metropolitan area.

== Definition ==
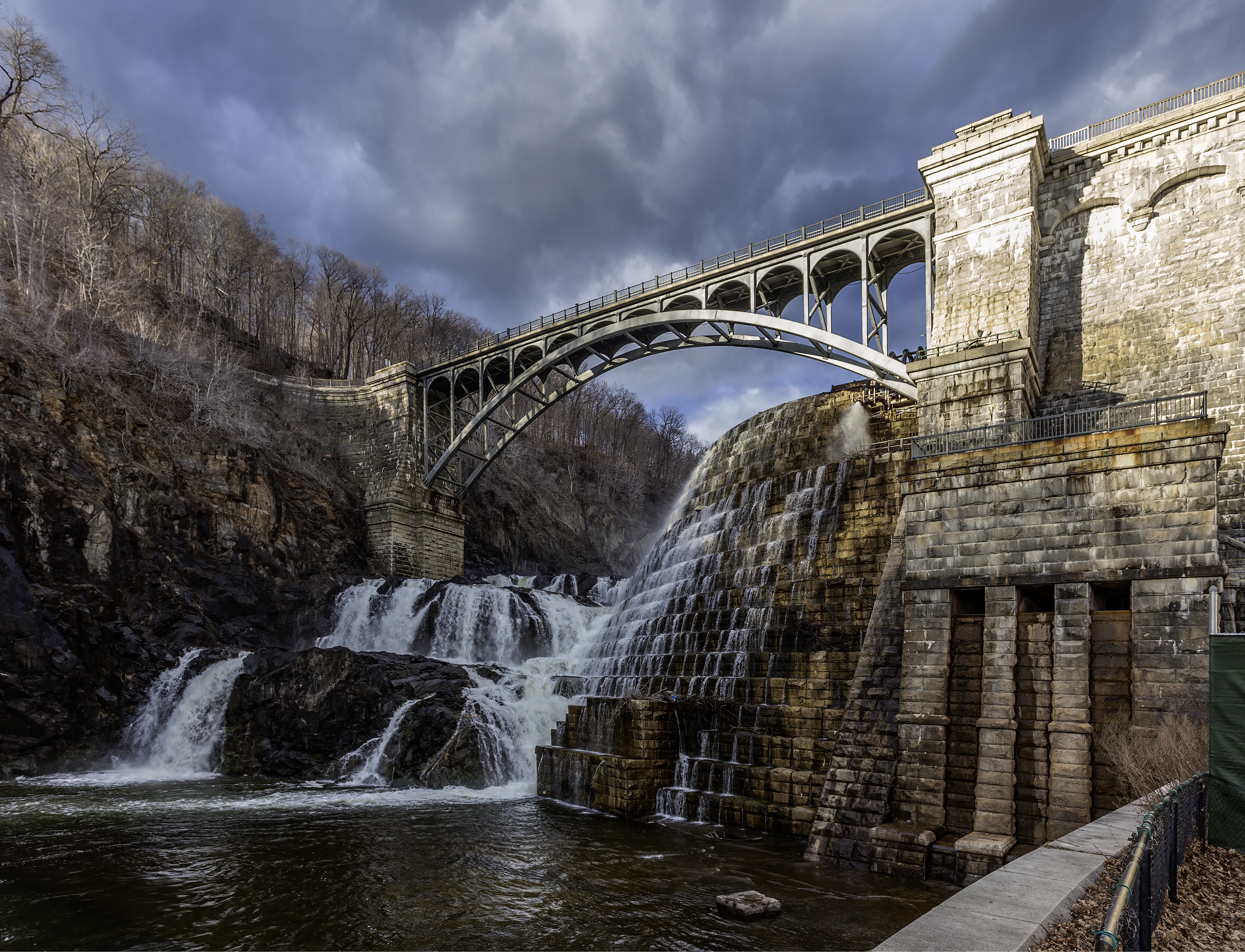
The three branches of the Croton River are collected at the New Croton Reservoir, part of New York City's Croton Watershed. Flow in excess of New York City's needs goes over a spillway at the New Croton Dam there and discharges into the Hudson River

The Croton River watershed is a hydrological feature, the 361 sq mi (930 km^{2}) drainage basin of the Croton River and its tributaries. It is not synonymous with the Croton Watershed, a term describing the rivers, reservoirs, dams, pump systems, and other infrastructure of the southernmost watershed of the New York City water supply system. Numerous small natural lakes and ponds, as well as large Lake Mahopac, are within the river's watershed and ultimately drain into it, but are not owned, leased, or controlled by the City water supply system. A map of the actual Croton Watershed is found here.

The Croton River (/ˈkroʊtən/ KROH-tən) is a river in southern New York with three principal tributaries: the West Branch, Middle Branch, and East Branch. Their waters, all part of the City water supply system, join downstream from the Croton Falls Reservoir. (Note: As a result of dam construction, the waters of the Middle and West Branches mingle in Croton Falls Reservoir before exiting as a brief stretch of the West Branch alone, which joins the East Branch at the confluence of the Croton River proper.) Together, their waters and the reservoirs linked to them represent the northern half of the New York City water system's Croton Watershed.

Shortly after the confluence of the three Croton River branches the Croton River proper, along with its tributary, the Muscoot River, flow into the Muscoot Reservoir, after which it empties into the New Croton Reservoir, which feeds the New Croton Aqueduct supplying water to New York City via the Jerome Park Reservoir in the Bronx. Excess water leaves the spillway at the New Croton Dam and empties into the Hudson River at Croton Point, at Croton-on-Hudson, New York, about 30 miles (50 km) north of New York City.

== Watershed ==
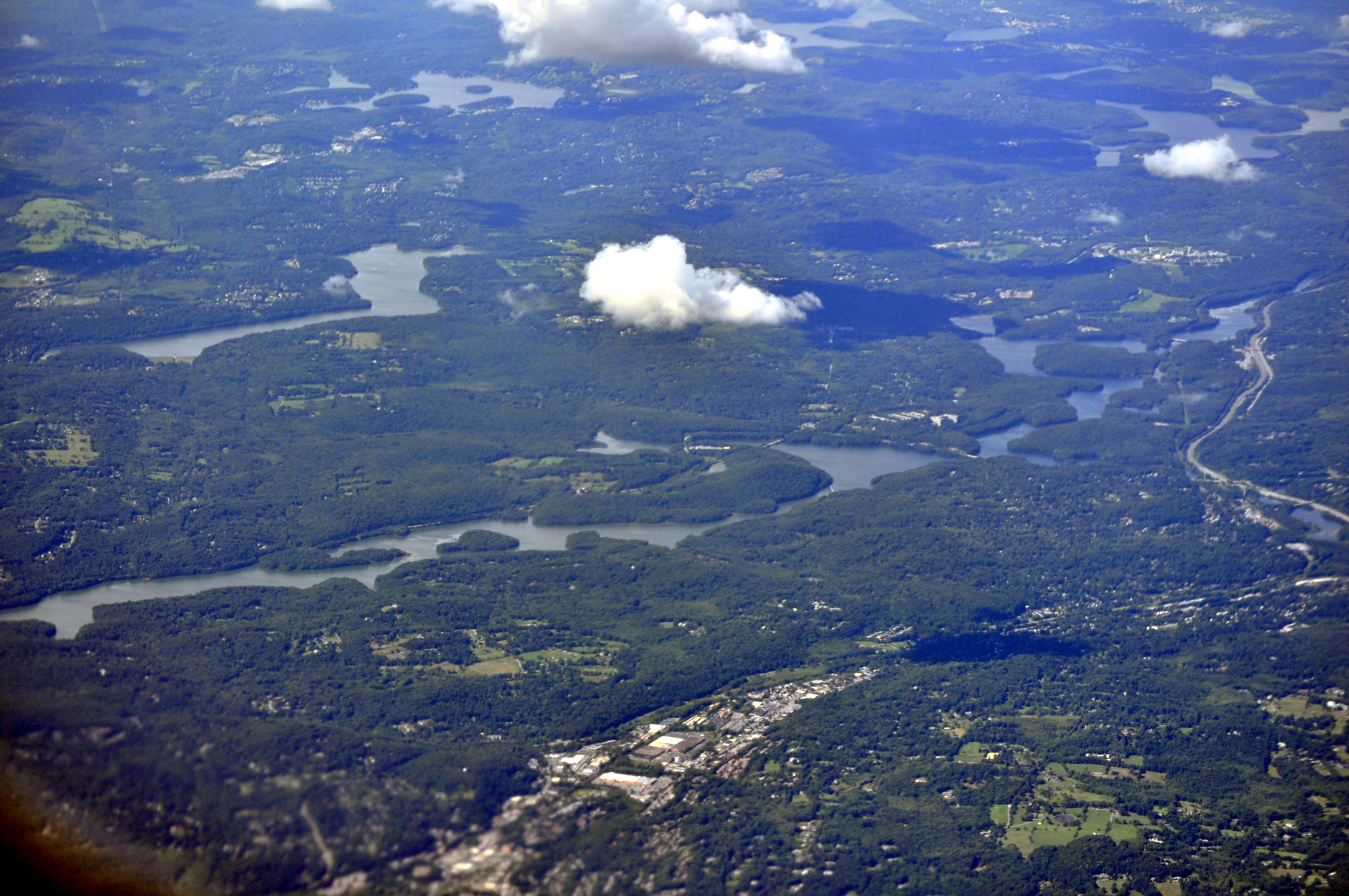
Aerial image of the north-central Croton River watershed, including: Muscoot, Amawalk, West Branch, Middle Branch, and Croton Falls reservoirs; controlled lakes Kirk, Gleneida, and Gilead; and auxiliary water source Lake Mahopac.

=== Waterways ===
- Croton River
  - West Branch
  - Middle Branch
  - East Branch
- Titicus River
- Muscoot River
- Cross River

=== Lakes and ponds ===
- Lake Mahopac
- Lake Carmel
- Long Pond (Carmel)

=== Reservoirs ===
- Boyds Corner
- West Branch
- Middle Branch
- Croton Falls / Diverting
- East Branch / Bog Brook
- Titicus
- Cross River
- Amawalk
- Muscoot
- New Croton

=== Controlled lakes ===
- Kirk
- Gilead
- Gleneida

=== Aqueduct ===
- The New Croton Aqueduct, completed in 1890, brings water from the New Croton Reservoir in Westchester and Putnam counties.

== Recreation ==
Limited recreation is permitted within the Croton Watershed. Its guidelines and requirements are listed here.

== See also ==
- Old Croton Aqueduct
- Water supply network
