= Boyds Corner Reservoir =

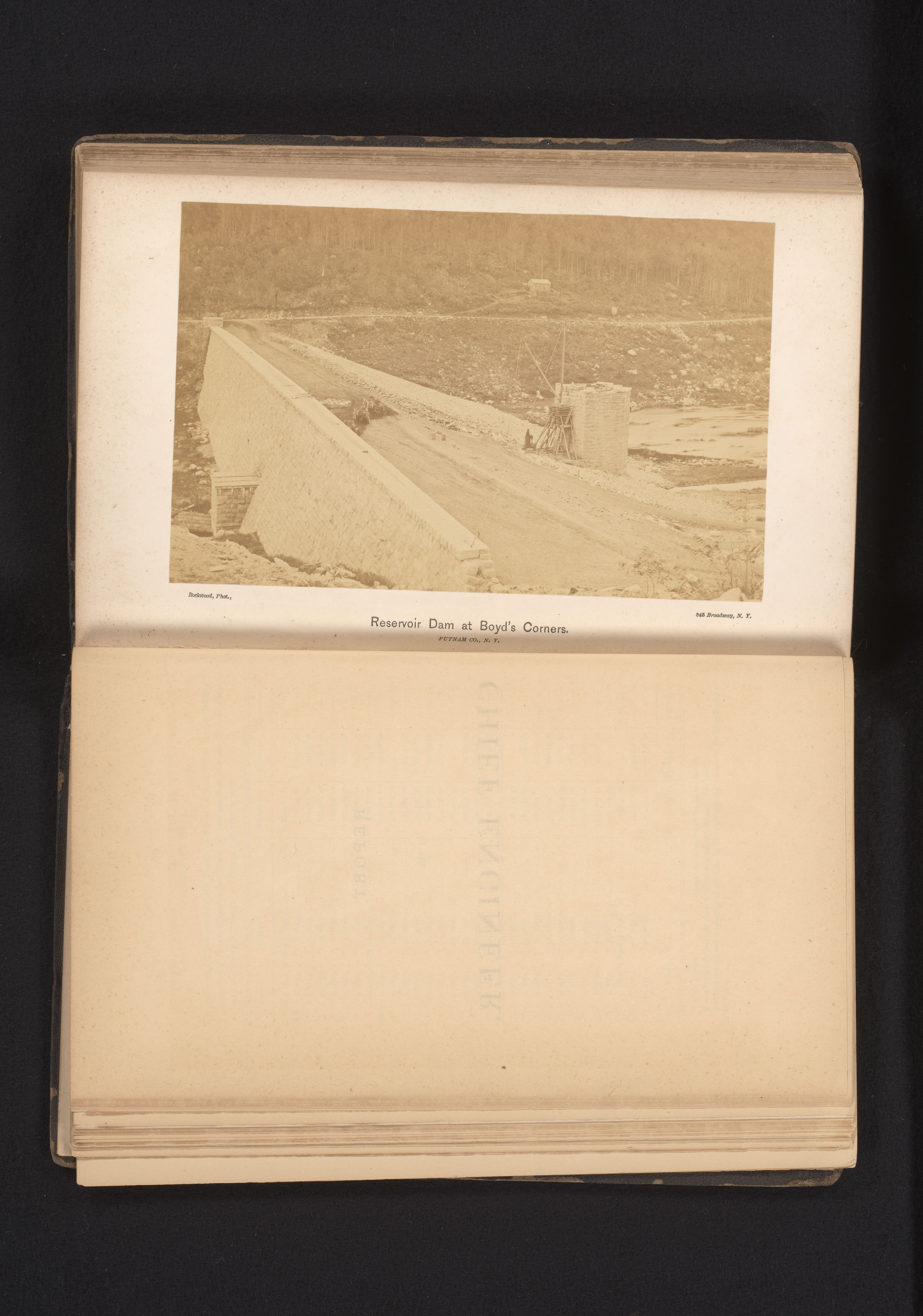
- Dam at Boyd's Corner Reservoir (between 1868 - 1872)

- Location within New York Boyds Corner Reservoir (the United States)
- Location: Kent, New York
- Coordinates: 41°27′31″N 73°45′04″W
- Type: reservoir
- Primary inflows: West Branch of the Croton River
- Primary outflows: West Branch of the Croton River
- Catchment area: 22 sq mi (57 km^{2})
- Basin countries: United States
- Built: 1873
- Water volume: 1.7 billion US gallons (6,400,000 m^{3})

The Boyds Corner Reservoir is a reservoir in the town of Kent in Putnam County, New York. Located about 50 miles (80 kilometers) north of New York City, it is the northernmost reservoir in the Croton River watershed, but is not part of the New York City water supply system's Croton Watershed. (Note: The land areas of the Croton River watershed and the Croton Watershed are the same, but their drainages are not. Numerous small natural lakes and ponds, as well as large Lake Mahopac, are part of the Croton River's watershed but not part of the NYC water supply system. In Boyds Corner's case its drainage falls within the Croton River's watershed but its waters bypass the City's Croton Watershed and flow directly into West Branch Reservoir, where they comingle with a body made up of that reservoir's drainage and the flow of the large Delaware Aqueduct bringing water from the Catskill Mountains west of the Hudson River. Only water in excess of New York City's needs (when such abundance exists) flow over the West Branch's spillway and back into the West Branch of the Croton River, where they are shortly impounded by the Croton Falls Reservoir of the New York City water supply system. There they comingle with waters from both the Middle and East Branches of the Croton River, via Middle Branch Reservoir and the Diverting Reservoir respectively, before continuing again on the main Croton River toward the New Croton Reservoir and thence to New York City. A map of the actual Croton Watershed is found here.) It was formed by impounding the West Branch of the Croton River, and holds 1.7 billion US gallons (6,400,000 m^{3}) of fresh water.

== History ==
Boyds Corner Reservoir was formed by impounding the Middle Branch of the Croton River in the then farming community of Kent, New York, in Putnam County, roughly 60 miles north of New York City. This was achieved by constructing the Boyds Corner Dam, a 78-foot (24 m) high structure completed in 1872 that used concrete in dam construction for the first time since the Ancient Romans. The reservoir was filled and was put into service in 1873, submerging the village of Boyds Corner, and making Boyds Corner the City's second oldest, after the New Croton Reservoir.

Construction of the Boyd's Corner Reservoir was overseen by William M. Tweed, known as “Boss” Tweed, Commissioner of the NYC Department of Public Works, who ordered the construction of an earthen embankment to strengthen the structure. This embankment was poorly constructed, seen as unnecessary, and an opportunity for graft. Boss Tweed was convicted of 204 counts of corruption in 1873 and died in prison in 1878. In 1874, according to the Putnam County Courier, Theodore Cole of Coles Mills sued New York City for $10,000 in damages due to the Boyds Corner Reservoir dam causing the stoppage of water from the Croton River to his four mills. Originally constructed as part of the City's Croton Watershed system, Boyds Corner today serves mainly as part of the Catskill/Delaware water supply system.

The Boyds Corner watershed drainage basin is 22 square miles (57 km^{2}) long and a mere 1.5 miles (2.4 km) wide, and includes the headwaters of the West Branch of the Croton River. It spans portions of the Towns of Kent and Putnam Valley in Putnam County, and East Fishkill in Dutchess County.

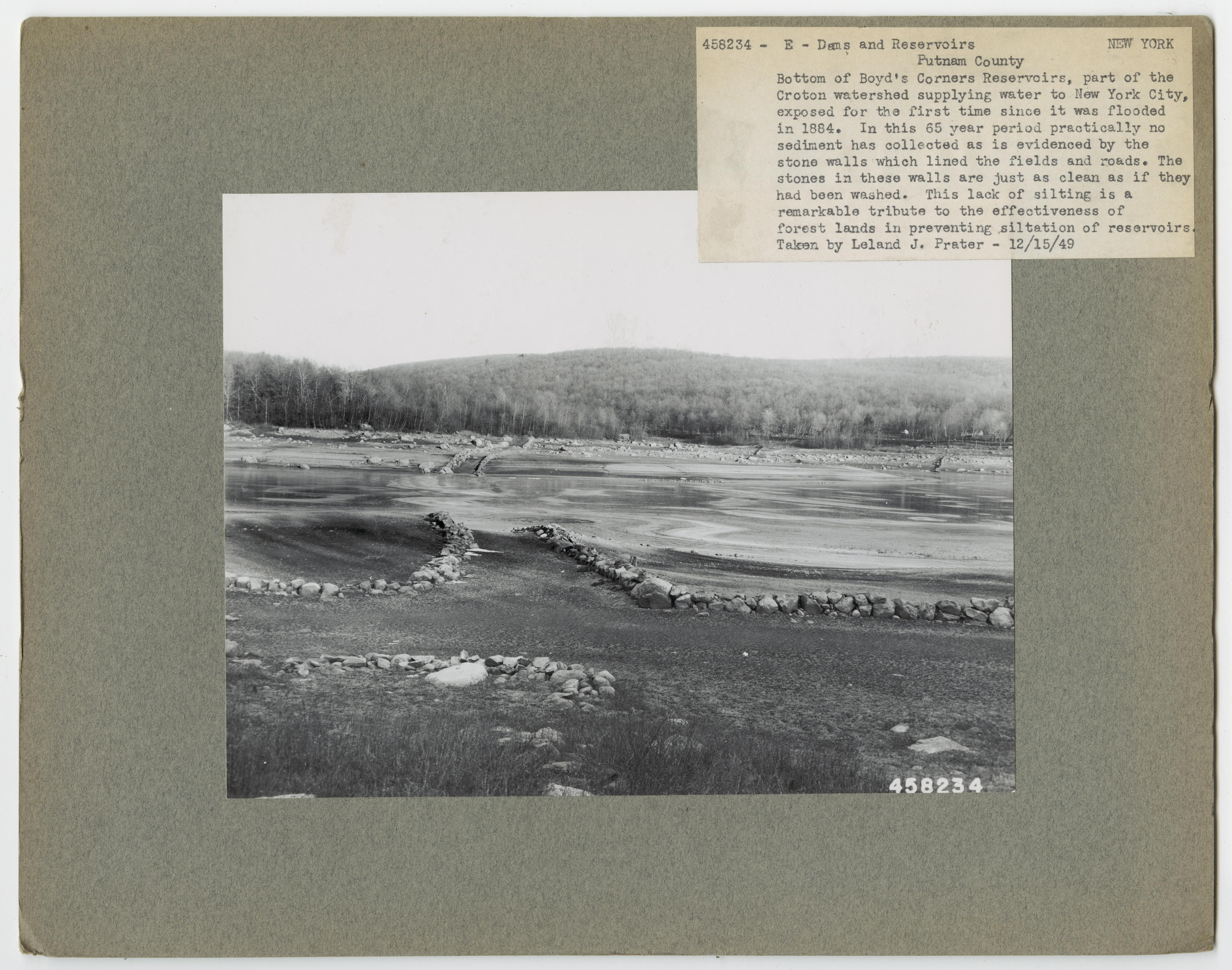
Boyd's Corner Reservoir drained in 1949, showing virtually no siltation

The reservoir can hold 1.7 billion US gallons (6,400,000 m^{3}). This makes it one of the smaller in New York City's water supply system. Water from Boyds Corner flows into the West Branch of the Croton River, near the defunct Colonial settlement of Coles Mills, then continues southeast to enter the West Branch Reservoir, where it mixes with water carried from the Rondout Reservoir west of the Hudson River by the Delaware Aqueduct.

Water from the West Branch Reservoir then continues via the aqueduct on to the Kensico Reservoir, which also receives a supply from the Catskill system through the Catskill Aqueduct. After settling at Kensico, the water flows through two aqueducts to the Hillview Reservoir in Yonkers, where it enters the City's distribution system.

Any water in excess of New York City's needs at the West Branch Reservoir is diverted over a spillway back into the West Branch of the Croton River, whence it becomes part of the City's Croton Watershed. It is then mixed with water from the Middle Branch of the Croton River at the Croton Falls Reservoir. Flow then briefly returns to the West Branch of the Croton River before reaching a confluence with the Croton River proper. This continues southwest to the New Croton Reservoir. Any water in excess of the City's needs there then goes over the New Croton Dam back into the Croton River, where it carried until discharging into the Hudson River at Croton-on-Hudson, New York.

After the Teton Dam failure on the Snake River in Idaho, all dams in the United States were inspected for weaknesses and deterioration. In the 1980s it was discovered that the hundred-plus year-old Boyds Corner Dam needed to be replaced. In spite of opposition by those who believed the dam was in good condition, it was dismantled and the basin stood empty until the new dam was completed in 1990 and the reservoir refilled to capacity . The reconstruction included the addition of a new spillway with a 6.1m wide flip bucket in the central dam section and the use of post-tensioned anchors to increase dam stability.
