= Middle Branch Reservoir =

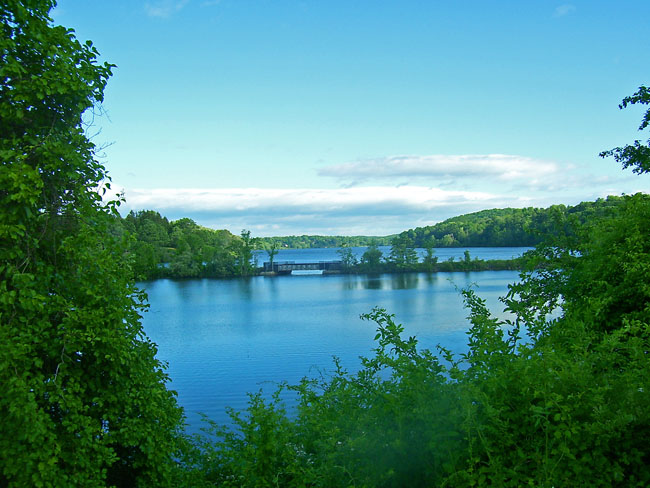

- Location within New York
- Location: Town of Southeast, Putnam County, New York
- Coordinates: 41°23′24″N 073°38′55″W
- Type: reservoir
- Primary inflows: Middle Branch Croton River
- Primary outflows: Middle Branch Croton River
- Catchment area: 21 sq mi (54 km^{2})
- Basin countries: United States
- Built: 1878
- Surface area: 400 acres (160 ha)
- Water volume: 4.1 billion U.S. gallons (16 million cubic meters)
- Surface elevation: 371 ft (113 m)

Middle Branch Reservoir is a reservoir in the New York City water supply system located in the Town of Southeast in Putnam County, 35 miles (65 km) north of the city. Created in 1878 by damming the Middle Branch of the Croton River, it is one of twelve in the Croton Watershed.

Middle Branch covers 400 acres (1.6 km^{2}), with an average depth of 31 feet (9.4 m), although some areas in the reservoir's southern extent reach 50 feet (15 m). It drains an area of 21 square miles (55 km^{2}) reaching into Dutchess County, the only Croton Watershed reservoir to do so. At full capacity, it holds 4.1 billion gallons (6.4 million m^{3}).

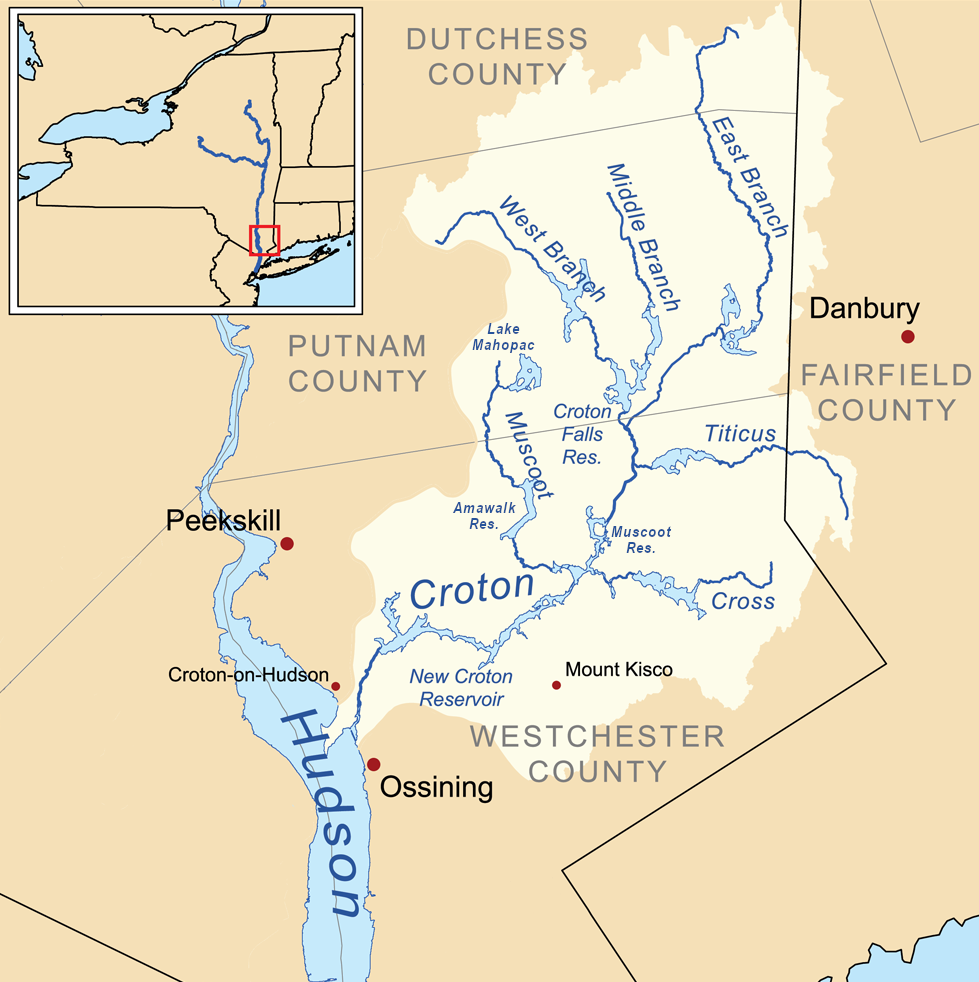
Map of the Croton River watershed (Note: Note that this is not identical with the New York City water supply system's "Croton Watershed". Numerous small natural lakes and ponds, as well as large Lake Mahopac, are part of the Croton River's watershed but not part of New York City’s supply system. A map of the actual Croton Watershed is found here.) showing Middle Branch Reservoir

The Middle Branch Reservoir drains into the Croton Falls Reservoir, which also receives overflow from the West Branch Reservoir, part of the West Branch Croton River watershed. The Croton Falls Reservoir drains back into the Middle Branch, and thence into the Croton River proper, which flows into the Muscoot Reservoir, then the New Croton Reservoir, before entering the New Croton Aqueduct. Water in the Aqueduct flows through The Bronx into the Jerome Park Reservoir.

== See also ==
- List of reservoirs and dams in New York
