= List of dams and reservoirs in New York =

This is a list of dams and reservoirs in the State of New York.

== Reservoirs ==
- Alcove Reservoir
- Allegheny Reservoir
- Amawalk Reservoir
- Ashokan Reservoir
- Basic Creek Reservoir
- Beacon Reservoir, Dutchess County
- Beacon Reservoir, Putnam County
- Blake Falls Reservoir
- Bog Brook Reservoir
- Boyds Corner Reservoir
- Browns Pond
- Lake Capra
- Cannonsville Reservoir
- Carry Falls Reservoir
- Chadwick Lake
- Cobb's Hill Reservoir
- Colgate Lake
- Cooper Lake
- Croton Falls Reservoir
- Cross River Reservoir
- Cuba Lake
- DeForest Lake
- Delta Reservoir
- DeRuyter Reservoir
- Diverting Reservoir
- East Branch Reservoir
- Eaton Reservoir
- Glenmere Lake
- Grassy Sprain Reservoir
- Great Sacandaga Lake
- Hillview Reservoir
- Highland Park Reservoir
- Hinckley Reservoir
- Jacqueline Kennedy Onassis Reservoir
- Jamesville Reservoir
- Jerome Park Reservoir
- Kenozia Lake
- Kensico Reservoir
- Lake Maratanza
- Lake Innisfree
- Lebanon Reservoir
- Lighthouse Hill Reservoir
- Lower Reservoir
- Middle Branch Reservoir
- Mill Brook Reservoir
- Mongaup Falls Reservoir
- Morris Reservoir
- Muscoot Reservoir
- Neversink Reservoir
- New Croton Reservoir
- Pepacton Reservoir
- Ramhannock Reservoir
- Ridgewood Reservoir
- Rondout Reservoir
- Salmon River Reservoir
- Schoharie Reservoir
- Soft Maple Reservoir
- Stewarts Bridge Reservoir
- Sturgeon Pond
- Swinging Bridge Reservoir
- Tomhannock Reservoir
- Tarrytown Reservoir
- Titicus Reservoir
- Lake Washington
- Waterport Reservoir
- West Branch Reservoir
- Westcott Reservoir
- Whitney Point Reservoir
- Woodland Reservoir

== Dams ==
- Amawalk Dam
- Blenheim-Gilboa Pumped Storage Power Project
- Boyds Corner Dam
- Cannonsville Dam
- Cross River Dam
- Cuba Lake Dam
- Cuddebackville Dam
- Conklingville Dam
- Downsville Dam
- East Sidney Dam
- Federal Dam
- Gilboa Dam
- Jamesville Dam
- Kensico Dam
- Marcy Dam
- Merian Dam
- Mount Morris Dam
- Muscoot Dam
- Neversink Dam
- New Croton Dam
- Olivebridge Dam
- Rushford / Caneadea Dam at Rushford Lake
- Stewart's Dam
- Sullivanville Dam
- Warrensburg Hydroelectric Dam

== See also ==
- List of dam removals in New York
- List of lakes of New York
