= West Branch Reservoir =

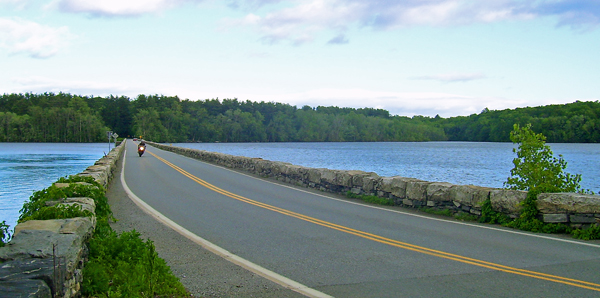
- The Carver Bridge, where NY 301 crosses the reservoir

- Location within New York
- Location: Putnam County, New York
- Coordinates: 41°25.5′N 73°42′W
- Type: Reservoir
- Primary inflows: West Branch of the Croton River
- Catchment area: 20 sq mi (52 km^{2})
- Basin countries: United States
- Built: 1895
- Water volume: 8 billion U.S. gallons (30 million cubic meters)
- Surface elevation: 490 feet (150 m)

The West Branch Reservoir is a reservoir in the New York City water supply system. Formed by impounding the upper reaches of the West Branch of the Croton River, it is located in the Putnam County, New York, towns of Carmel, and Kent, about 50 miles (80 km) north of New York City.

== Description ==
West Branch Reservoir lies along the West Branch Croton River, one of three branches of the Croton River within the larger Croton River watershed. Put into service in 1895, it is one of 12 reservoirs in the New York City water system's upstate Croton Watershed, and second northernmost. It consists of two basins, separated by State Route 301, and can hold up to 8 billion US gallons (30,000,000 m^{3}) of water at full capacity.

In addition to its own 20 square mile (32 km^{2}) drainage basin, it receives the flow of the upstream Boyds Corner Reservoir, and, when needed, supply from Lake Gleneida, a controlled lake in the City supply system.

Primarily, however, West Branch serves as a settling basin for waters of the Delaware Aqueduct, the southern of the City's two Catskill Mountain watersheds located to the west of the Hudson River. Flow from the much larger Rondout Reservoir, a collection point for the Cannonsville, Neversink, and Pepacton reservoirs, is pumped across the river via the aqueduct's Chelsea Pumping Station near Beacon, on the east bank of the river in Dutchess County some 65 miles (105 km) from New York City.

Combined, the four Delaware System reservoirs account for 1,012 square miles (2,620 km^{2}) of watershed and 320.4 billion US gallons (1.213×10^{9} m^{3}) of capacity, 890 million US gallons (3,400,000 m^{3}) of which goes to the city daily — 50% of the entire system's capacity.

During drought periods the West Branch also receives water pumped in directly from the Hudson River by the Chelsea Pumping Station. It was used for this purpose during the 1965–66 and 1985 droughts, as well as during May 1989.

After settling at West Branch, the reservoir releases its combined waters back into the Delaware aqueduct to be carried to the Kensico Reservoir in southern Westchester County.

Upon arriving at Kensico the Delaware Aqueduct flow joins with that of the City's Catskill Aqueduct and waters of the Kensico's own drainage basin. After settling, these are carried by tunnels to the Hillview Reservoir in Yonkers, at the city's northern boundary. There they enter the city's direct water supply distribution system, flowing via tunnels through the boroughs of The Bronx, Queens, and Brooklyn. The water finally stops at Staten Island.

Water in excess of New York City's needs at the West Branch Reservoir goes over its spillway and back into the West Branch Croton River, which is captured downstream by the Croton Falls Reservoir, and ends up in the New Croton Reservoir, once again part of the Croton Watershed.

Building the Reservoir required displacing some of the earliest settlements along the West Branch of the Croton River including Coles Mills.

=== Delaware Aqueduct Repair ===
The Delaware Aqueduct inflow to the West Branch Reservoir had been scheduled to be shut down from October 2024 to May 2025 so a section of the Aqueduct leaking 35 million gallons per day could be repaired. Given low rainfall at the time, the project was postponed until after 2027. The West Branch Reservoir will remain open with natural flow from the West Branch Croton River and the Boyd's Corner reservoir while a new $2 billion 2.5-mile-long bypass under the Hudson River will be connected. The project will entail an 8-month shutdown which will run from October to May of the following year.

== See also ==
- List of reservoirs and dams in New York
