= Kirk Lake (New York) =

Lake of the United States of America

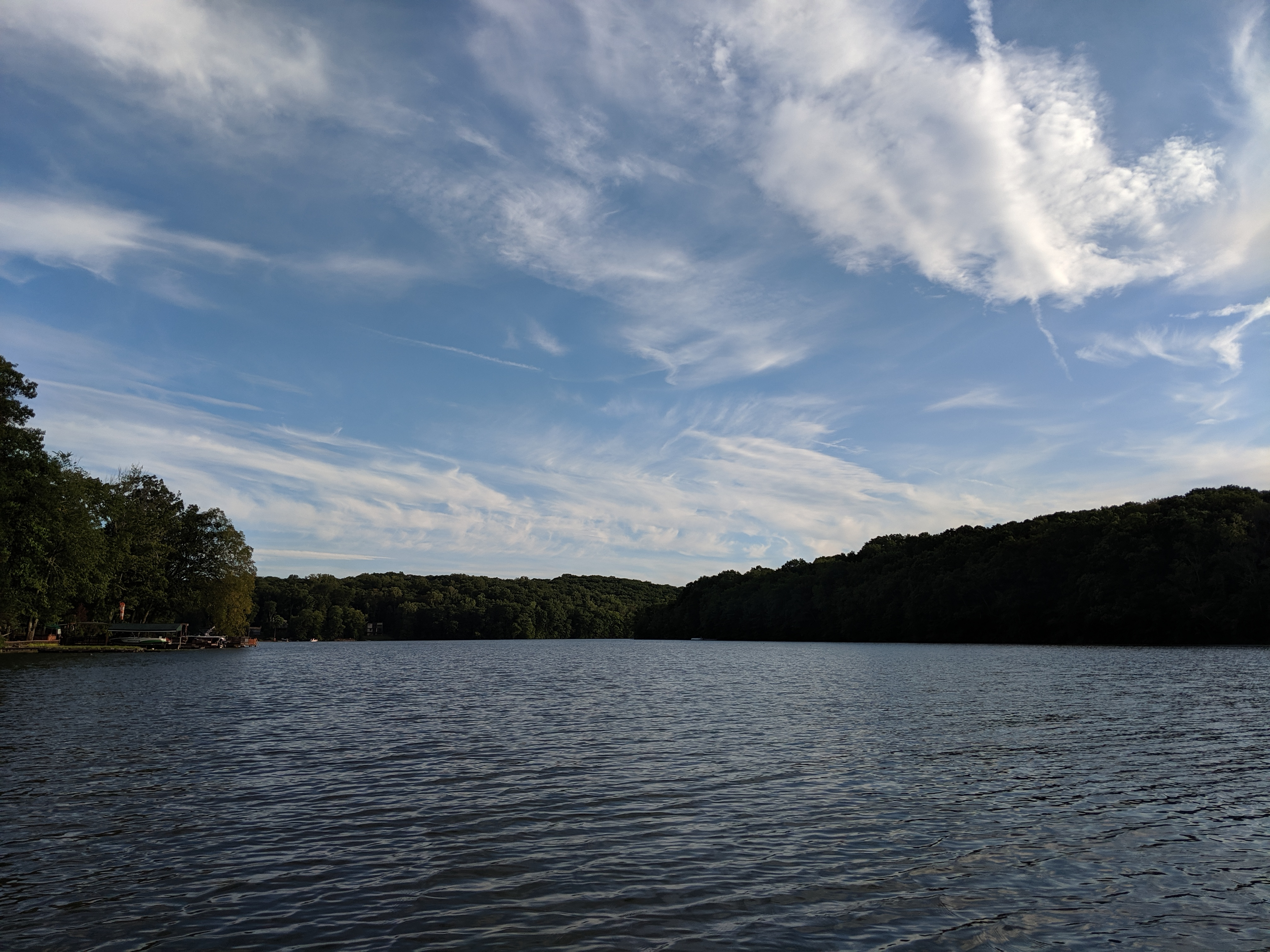
- From north tip looking south

- Location within New York Location within the United States
- Location: Mahopac, New York
- Coordinates: 41°23′06″N 73°45′04″W
- Type: controlled lake
- Catchment area: 122 acres (49 ha)
- Basin countries: United States
- Max. length: 0.8 mi (1.3 km)
- Surface area: 168 acres (68 ha)
- Average depth: 10 ft (3.0 m)
- Max. depth: 23 ft (7.0 m)
- Water volume: 920 acre⋅ft (1,130,000 m^{3})
- Surface elevation: 592.3 ft (180.5 m)
- Website: https://www.kirklake.org/

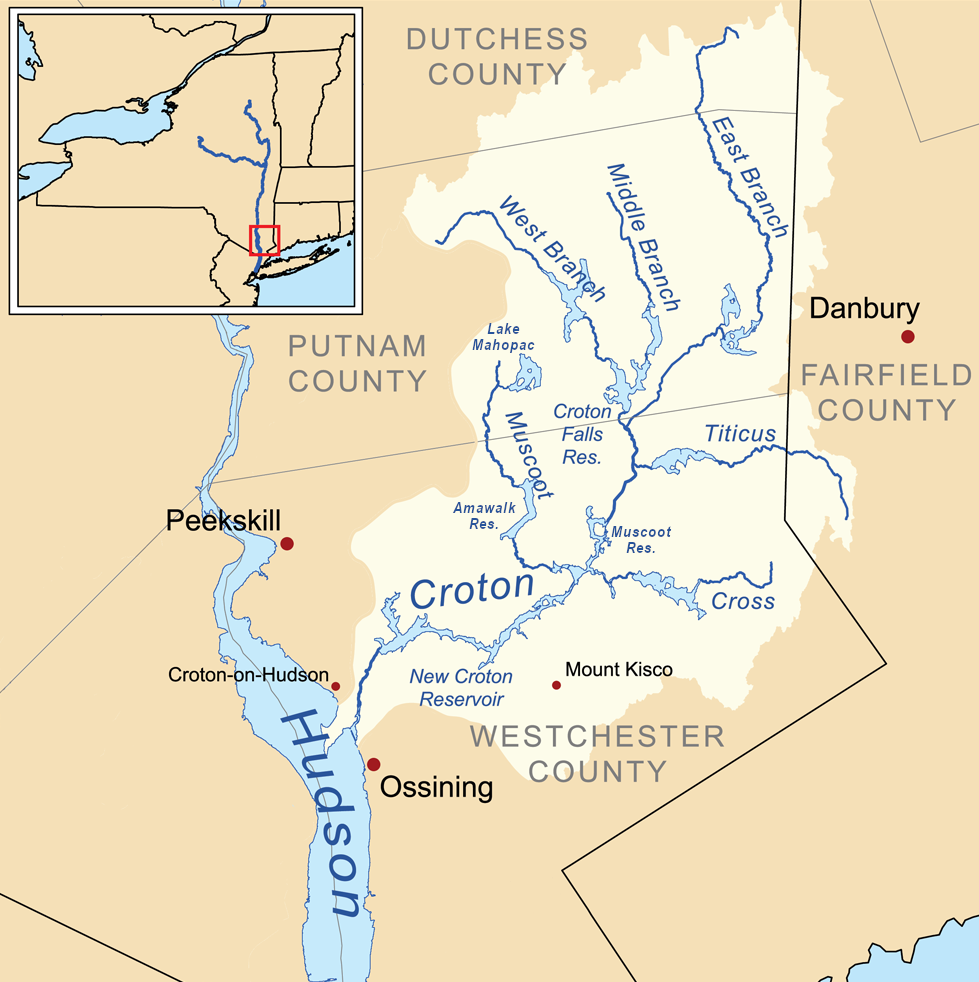
Map of the Croton River watershed showing the Muscoot River. Kirk Lake lies above its northernmost indicated headwater, due west of Lake Mahopac

Kirk Lake is a controlled lake in the hamlet of Mahopac in the town of Carmel in Putnam County, New York. First impounded in 1871, with a substantially larger dam placed in 1881, it lies due west and sharply below considerably larger Lake Mahopac. It is one of three controlled lakes in the New York City water supply system's Croton Watershed.

The outfall of Kirk Lake is a tributary of the Muscoot River, which flows into the Croton River that drains the Croton River watershed. Waters from Kirk lake join the Muscoot approximately one mile below its northernmost headwaters to the west. Approximately one-half mile south of their confluence the river is joined by a small flow from Lake Mahopac, (Note: Controlled by a sluice gate in the lake's southwestern corner, opened in times of surfeit and in a seasonal drawdown to accommodate winter snowmelt.) which picks up the flow of several more streams before crossing into Westchester County and draining into the Amawalk Reservoir in the town of Somers.

== History ==
Kirk Lake was originally much smaller than today. An initial dam was built in 1871, and substantially altered into a 220 foot wide, 28 foot high structure in 1881, dramatically enlarging its impoundment area. It is unclear whether there would be any natural impoundment at all if it were removed.

The dam is a stone masonry-earth buttress. The top of the dam is 592.3 feet above Mean Sea Level. Its crest is 61 feet wide, some 28 feet above the flow that drains into Muscoot River. Maximum reservoir capacity is 1822 acre-feet, or .6 billion US gallons (2,300,000 m^{3}). Kirk Lake is owned by the New York City Department of Environmental Protection (which absorbed the New York City Bureau of Water Supply). Its drainage area is 2.95 square miles, and maximum discharge of its spillway and 36" overflow pipe 440 cubic feet of water per second. A 1981 report by the New York District Corps of Engineers determined that the dam possessed structural deficiencies that would require attention to mitigate flood risks. This work was completed in September 2000.

The normal length of Kirk Lake's pool is 0.8 miles, with a total surface area of 122 acres. Its maximum depth is 23 ft (7.0 m) and mean is 10 ft (3.0 m). Maximum pool size is 220 acres. Its normal capacity is 920 acre-feet, or .3 billion US gallons (1,100,000 m^{3}), and its waters have a retention time of .24 years.

== See also ==
- List of rivers of New York
