= East Branch Reservoir =

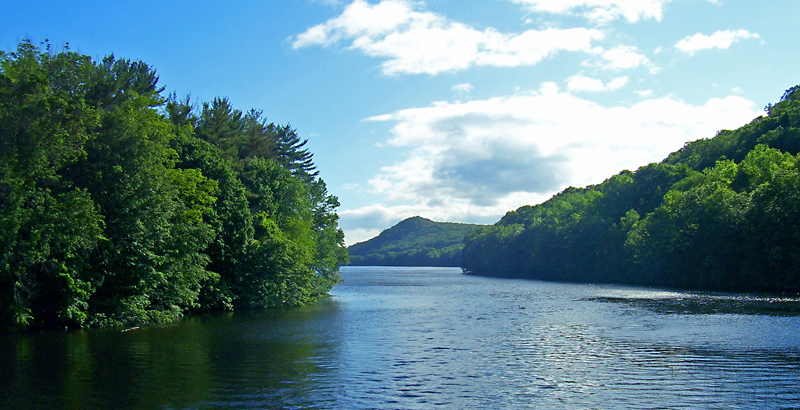

- Location within New York Location within the United States
- Location: Putnam County, New York
- Coordinates: 41.397039°N 73.591238°W
- Type: reservoir
- Primary inflows: East branch of the Croton River
- Catchment area: 75 sq mi (190 km^{2})
- Basin countries: United States
- Built: 1891
- Surface area: 525 acres (2.12 km^{2})
- Average depth: 32 ft (9.8 m)
- Water volume: 5.2 billion US gal (20 million m^{3})
- Surface elevation: 417 ft (127 m)

East Branch Reservoir, is a reservoir in the town of Southeast, New York, near the village of Brewster. Part of the New York City water supply system, it was formed by impounding the East Branch of the Croton River. Forming part of the Croton Watershed, it was placed into service in 1891, and lies some 35 miles (56 km) north of the city, in the southeast corner of Putnam County.

== History ==
The East Branch Reservoir has a surface area of 525 acres (2.12 km^{2}), reaches a mean depth of 32 feet (9.8 m), and holds 5.2 billion US gal (20 million m^{3}) at full capacity. It drains a 75-square-mile (190 km^{2}) area that includes Bog Brook Reservoir. Its water flows back into the East Branch of the Croton River south of the dam, then into The Diverting Reservoir, then via the Croton River to the Muscoot and the New Croton reservoirs, into the New Croton Aqueduct. Water from the aqueduct flows into the Jerome Park Reservoir in the Bronx for daily distribution.

One of two double reservoirs in NYC's system, it is connected to the Bog Brook impoundment via a 1,778-foot (542 m) tunnel. When the two were being built, the project's name was "Double Reservoir I". The second double reservoir project ("Double Reservoir II") would create the Croton Falls and Diverting reservoirs.

The village of Southeast Center, named for the town of Southeast, was leveled and flooded to create the reservoir. Parts of the village remain, including Sodom Road, at the foot of the Sodom Dam, which holds the reservoir back.

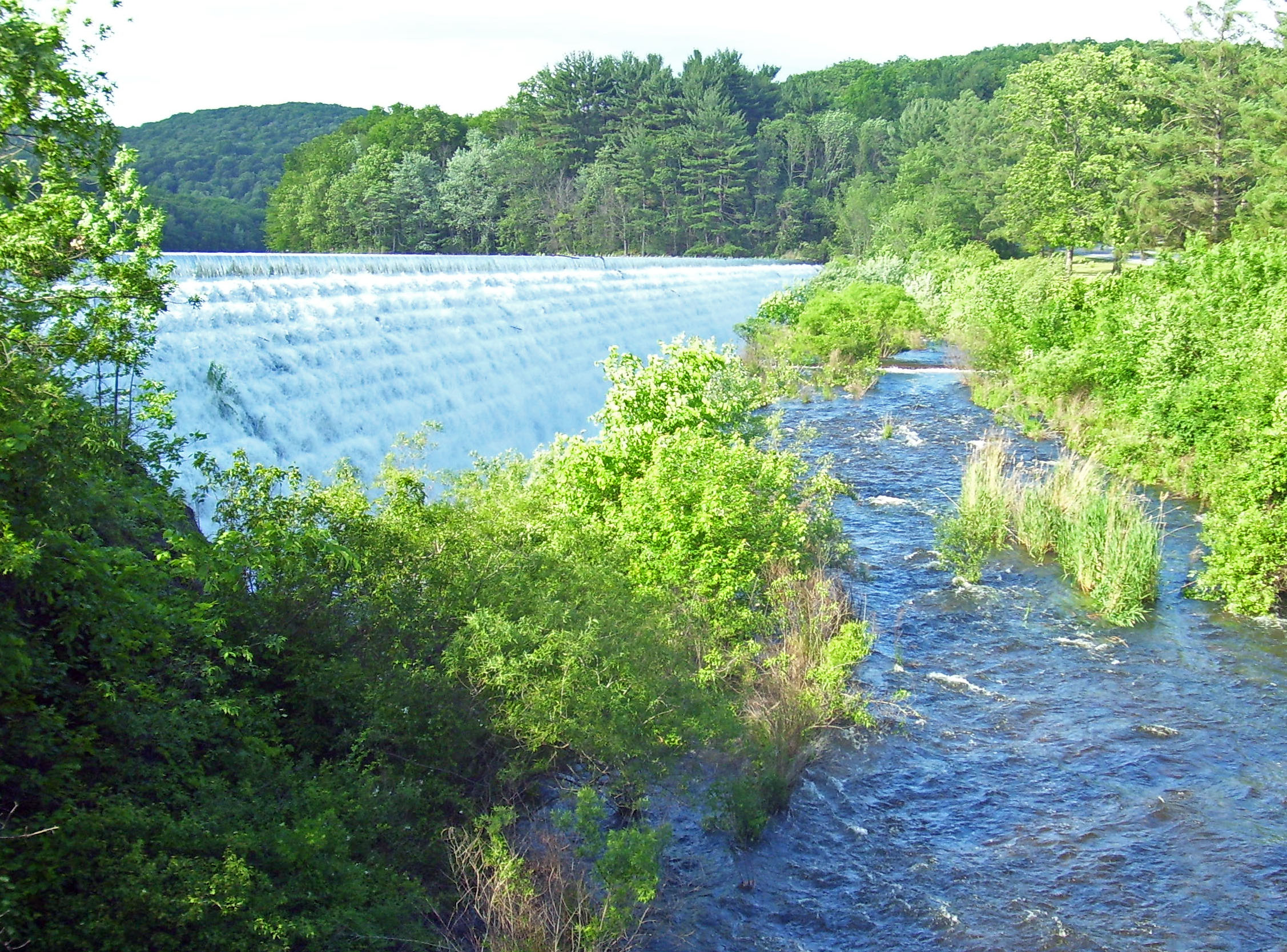
Spillway (June, 2006)

Construction of the reservoir also flooded part of the village of Milltown in the northeastern corner of Southeast, near present-day Deforest Corners. Many of the village's original buildings were moved to higher ground, onto present-day Milltown Road, one of Southeast's longest roads running from New Fairfield, Connecticut, to Route 22 in Southeast. The village of Milltown's one-room schoolhouse still stands today as a private residence. Foundations, rock walls and roadbeds for both villages can still be seen during droughts.

== See also ==
- List of reservoirs and dams in New York
