= Muscoot River =

Tributary of the Croton River, Putnam

Coordinates: 41°16′10″N 73°43′31″W

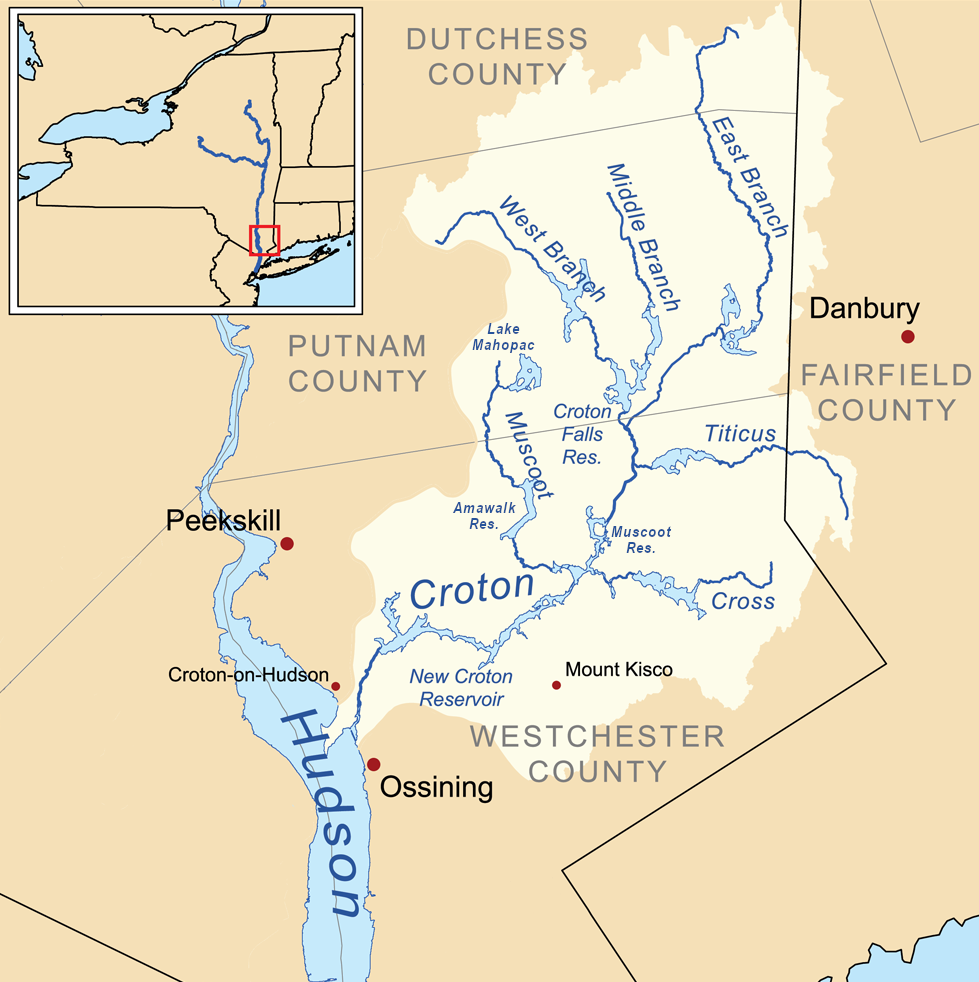
Map of the Croton River watershed showing the Muscoot River

The Muscoot River is a short tributary of the Croton River in Putnam and Westchester counties in the state of New York. Approximately 13 mi (21 km) long and running irregularly southeast, it lies within the Croton River watershed and is part of the New York City water supply system's Croton Watershed.

== Path ==
The rivers headwaters form west of Kirk Lake, a controlled lake in the New York City water supply system in the Putnam County hamlet of Mahopac, New York, in the Town of Carmel. Approximately 0.8 mi. south they are joined by the outflow of Kirk Lake, and 0.2 mi. further south those of Lake Mahopac (Note: Not a part of the Croton Watershed. Its outfall is controlled by a sluice gate in the lake's southwestern corner, opened in times of surfeit and in a seasonal drawdown to accommodate winter snowmelt.) at Red Mills.

About 0.6 mi. south of this confluence the outflow of Lake MacGregor joins, and another 0.9 mi. or so further the flow of Secor Brook, an outfall from Lake Secor to the northwest. Heading slightly southeast the river crosses the Westchester County line approximately 2.0 mi. on, and continuing in that direction another on a convoluted path drains 2.75 mi. later into the Amawalk Reservoir in the town of Somers.

Upon leaving the Amawalk Reservoir via a spillway in the Amawalk Dam at the reservoir's southern end approximately 2.75 mi. later, the Muscoot is joined by Hallocks Mill Brook from the west 0.5 mi. downstream. Approximately 3.0 mi. later it flows into the northwestern reaches of the Muscoot Reservoir west of Whitehall Corners and northwest of Katonah, New York, after a total course of somewhat under 13.0 miles. The waters of Muscoot Reservoir then join with those of the New Croton Reservoir before either being carried to New York City via the New Croton Aqueduct or, in times of surplus, over the spillway at the New Croton Dam and into the Croton River, then carried into the Hudson River at Croton-on-Hudson at Croton Point about 30 miles (50 km) north of New York City.

== See also ==
- List of rivers of New York
