= Middle Branch Croton River =

Coordinates: 41°22′12″N 73°39′45″W

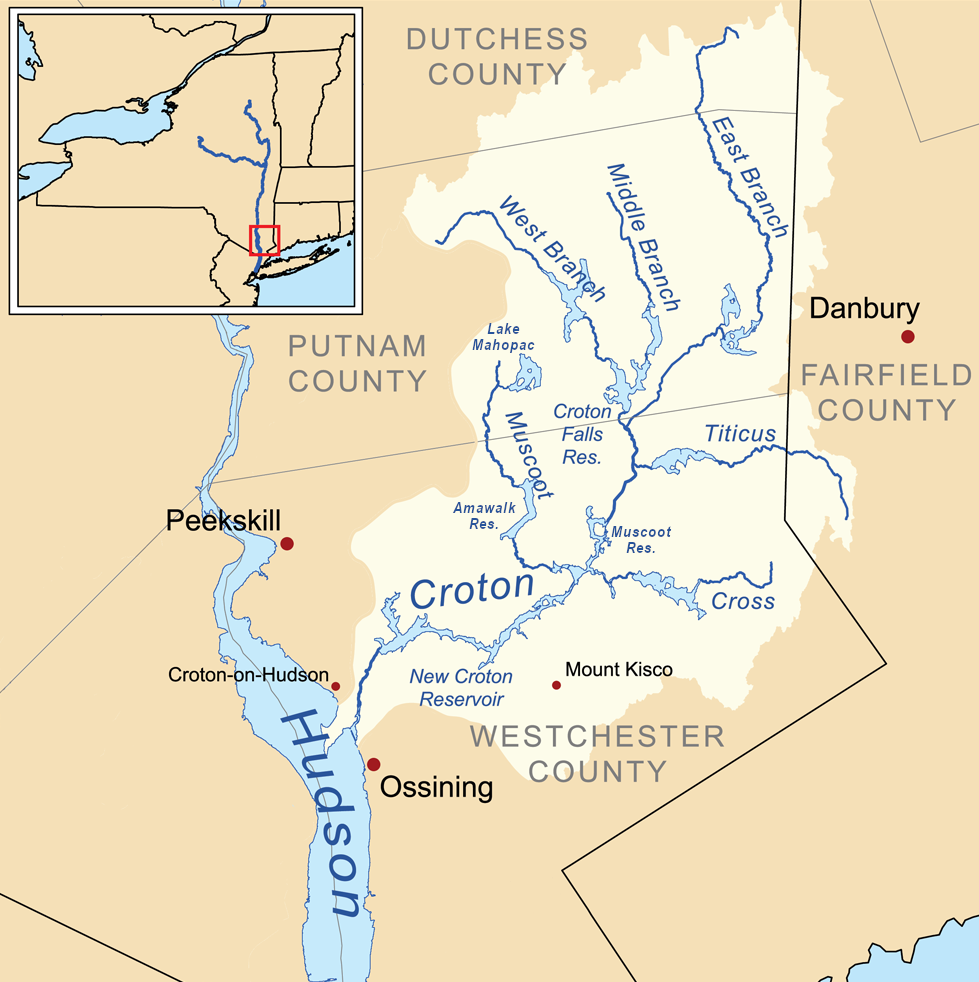
Map of the Croton River watershed showing the Middle Branch

The Middle Branch Croton River is a tributary of the Croton River in Putnam and Westchester counties in the state of New York. It lies within the Croton River watershed and is part of the New York City water supply system's Croton Watershed.

== Path ==
The rivers headwater is a small pond at the intersection of Horsepound Road and NY State Route 52 about one mile north of the hamlet of Lake Carmel in the far central eastern part of the town of Kent in Putnam County. It is shortly joined by a small stream, then runs into manmade Lake Carmel, one of the few sizable bodies of water in the Croton River watershed that is not part of the New York City water supply system. It drains out due east midway along the lake then promptly heads strongly south for about three miles before spilling into Middle Branch Reservoir in the town of Carmel, New York. It then flows into the Croton Falls Reservoir immediately above the Westchester border, where it commingles with some waters of the East Branch Croton River flowing out of the Diverting Reservoir immediately to the east of the Croton Falls Reservoir and the whole flow of the West Branch Croton River. These combined waters exit the Croton Falls Reservoir for a brief stretch of the West Branch alone, which joins the rest of the East Branch at the confluence of the Croton River proper in Croton Falls, a hamlet of the town of North Salem, New York, in northern Westchester County.

== See also ==
- List of rivers of New York
