= Croton Reservoir =

Croton Reservoir may refer to:

- Croton Distributing Reservoir, completed in 1842 and demolished in 1899
- Croton Falls Reservoir, completed in 1911 and still in service
- New Croton Reservoir, completed in 1905 and still in service
