= Croton Watershed =

Part of the New York City water supply system

Coordinates: 41°11′1.34″N 73°52′46.49″W

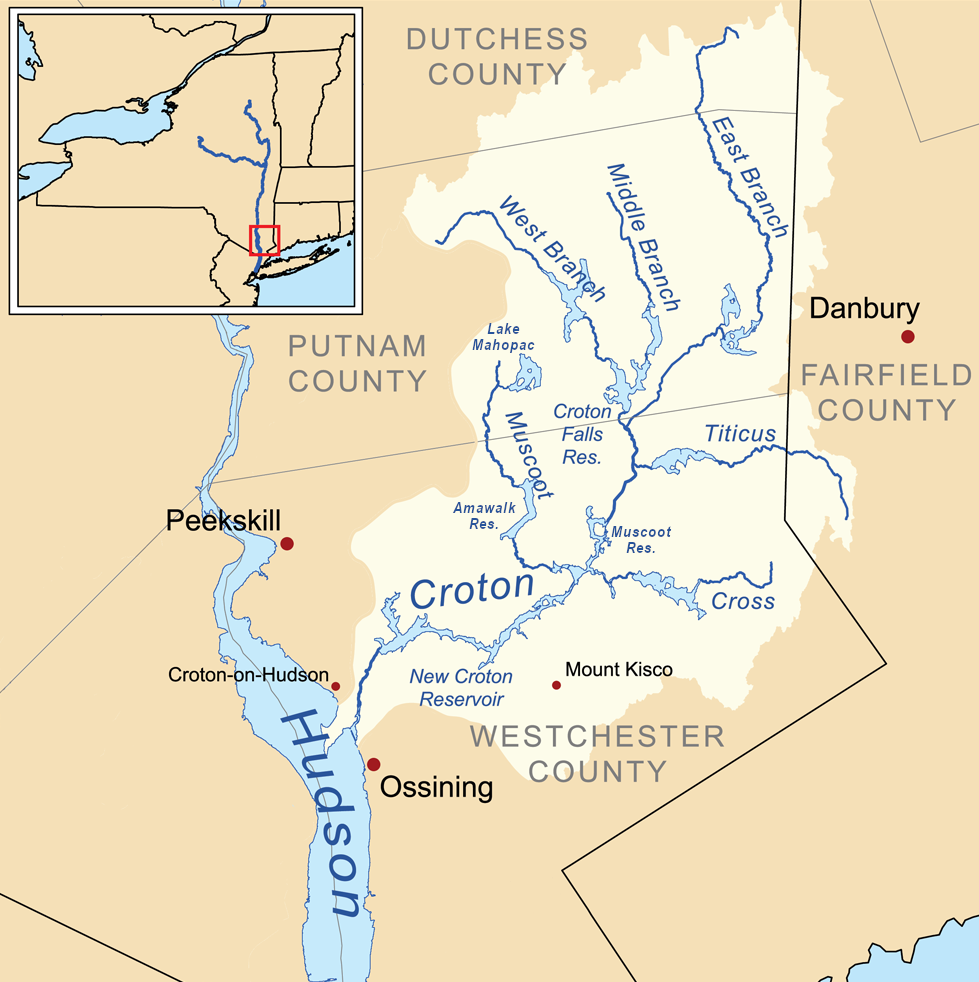
Map of the Croton River watershed. Note that this is not identical with the New York City water supply system's "Croton Watershed". (Note: The land areas are the same, but their drainages are not coterminous. Numerous small natural lakes and ponds, as well as large Lake Mahopac, are part of the Croton River's watershed but not a direct part of the NYC water supply system - though all of their outfalls drain into streams or rivers captured by the system.) A map of the actual Croton Watershed is found here.

The Croton Watershed is the New York City water supply system's name for its southernmost watershed and its infrastructure, (Note: Including dams, spillways, tunnels, pumps, and related mechanical components not part of a hydrological drainage basin.) an organized entity rather than a mere hydrological feature. Spanning large swaths of Putnam and Westchester counties in far southeastern New York State, it represents the drainage, flow, and operating systems of some seven rivers, one dozen reservoirs, (Note: Less waters from the drainage basins of the Boyds Corner and the West Branch reservoirs, which are mixed in West Branch with the flow of the NYC system's Delaware Aqueduct and after settling carried on by the aqueduct to the Kensico Reservoir.) and three controlled lakes falling within the Croton River watershed.

Over 350 square miles (910 km^{2}) in area, the Watershed holds some 100 billion US gallons (380,000,000 m^{3}) of fresh water. (Note: 86.6 billion US gallons (328,000,000 m^{3}) in reservoirs, roughly 5.5 billion US gallons (21,000,000 m^{3}) in controlled lakes, and 7.5 billion US gallons (28,000,000 m^{3}) in its river system.) The vast majority of this ends up at the Jerome Park Reservoir in the Bronx via the New Croton Aqueduct, from which it is distributed. Water in excess of New York City's needs spills over the New Croton Dam at the New Croton Reservoir and is carried by the Croton River into the Hudson River at Croton-on-Hudson, New York, about 30 miles north of the Metropolitan area.

Limited recreation is permitted within the Croton Watershed. Its guidelines and requirements are listed here.

== Definition ==
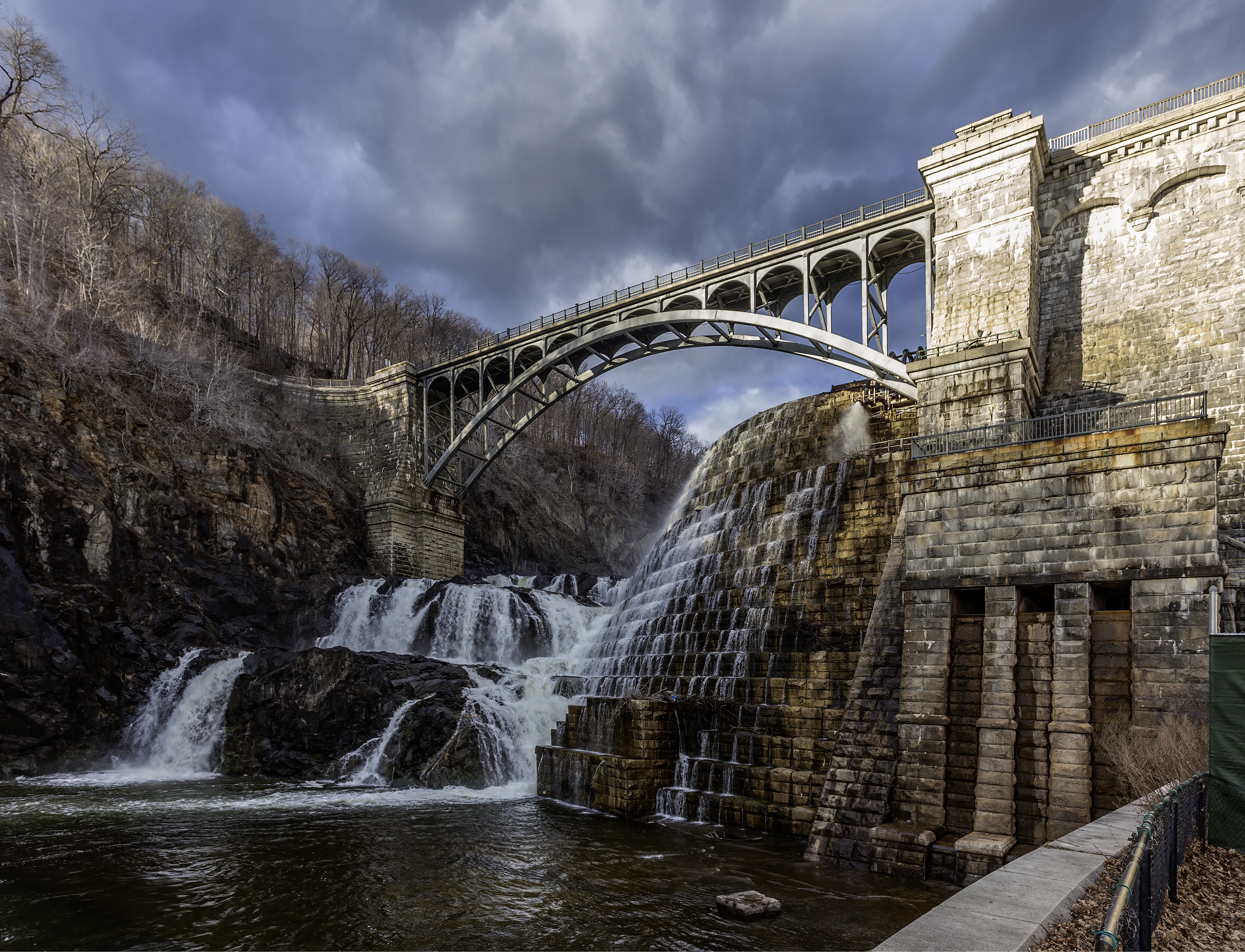
The three branches of the Croton River are collected at the New Croton Reservoir. Flow in excess of New York City's needs goes over a spillway at the New Croton Dam there and discharges into the Hudson River

The Croton Watershed is a term describing a part of the New York City water supply system (map here). It is not synonymous with the biological feature Croton River watershed. Numerous small natural lakes and ponds, as well as large Lake Mahopac, are within the river's watershed but not a direct part of the NYC water supply system. They are not owned or maintained by the New York City watershed system, but ultimately drain into it. (Note: Lake Mahopac, which features a sluice gate at its extreme southwestern corner, is an auxiliary water source for the New York City system.)

Further, the drainage basins of the Boyds Corner and the West Branch reservoirs fall within the Croton River watershed but do not end up delivered to New York City in the waters of the Croton Watershed. Though the waters of those basins are collected within their respective reservoirs, Boyds Corners drains into West Branch, which then receives the entire flow of the NYC system's Delaware Aqueduct. After mixing and settling, the combined waters of these watersheds on both sides of the Hudson River continue on via the balance of the Delaware Aqueduct to the Kensico Reservoir; there they are joined by those of the Catskill Aqueduct, settle, then continue on to the Hillview Reservoir in Yonkers for distribution in New York City. Only overflow from West Branch Reservoir's spillway, composed predominantly of Delaware Aqueduct waters, continues on a downstream section of the West Branch Croton River, thence into the tandem of the Croton Falls Reservoir-Diverting Reservoir, and downstream from them ultimately into the New Croton Reservoir and the New Croton Aqueduct into New York City.

== Watershed ==
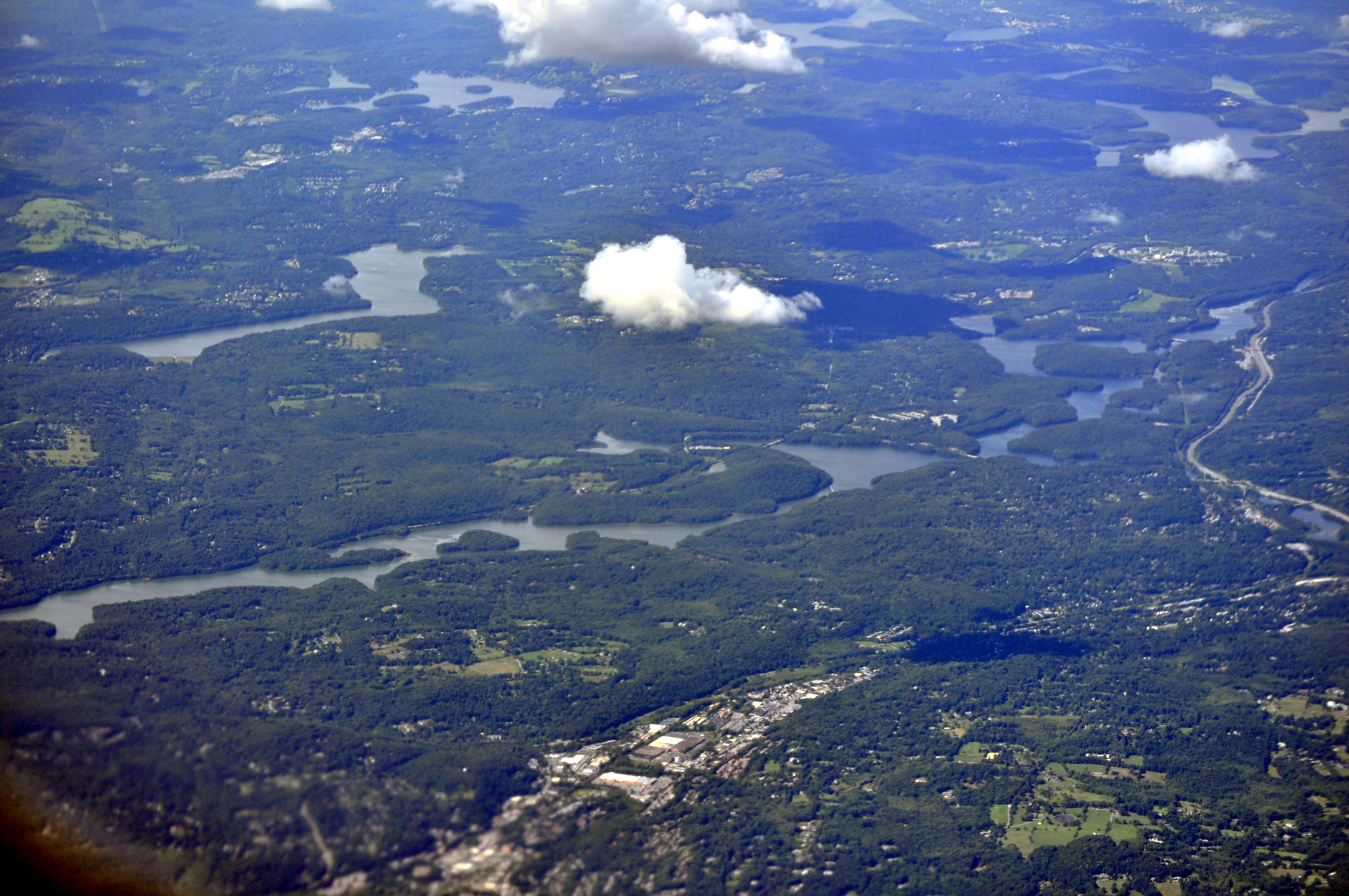
Aerial image of the north-central Croton River watershed, including: Muscoot, Amawalk, West Branch, Middle Branch, and Croton Falls reservoirs; controlled lakes Kirk, Gleneida, and Gilead; and auxiliary water source Lake Mahopac.

The Croton River is a river in southern New York with three principal tributaries: the West Branch, Middle Branch, and East Branch: all are part of the New York City water supply system, and together combine for a watershed of 361 square miles (930 km^{2}) spanning very southeasternmost Dutchess County, eastern and central Putnam County, and northeastern Westchester County.

The waters of the West Branch are first dammed and held by the Boyds Corner Reservoir, which drains into the West Branch Reservoir. There they are joined by the flow of the Delaware Aqueduct, and after mixing and settling continue via it to the Kensico Reservoir. Only overflow crossing the West Branch Reservoir's spillway continues as a resumption of the West Branch Croton River downstream of it. This flows into the Croton Falls Reservoir, which also receives the entire flow of the Middle Branch Croton River via the Middle Branch Reservoir lying immediately upstream of it.

The Croton Falls Reservoir also receives part of the flow of the East Branch Croton River from the Diverting Reservoir built downstream of the East Branch Reservoir and Bog Brook Reservoir (via a channel and dividing weir linking the Croton Falls and Diverting reservoirs allowing water to freely pass between them, and comingling waters of all three branches in both). A separate outflow from the Diverting Reservoir also drains into the continuation of the East Branch. Both the West and East Branches continue south separately before joining to end the northern half of the New York City water system's Croton Watershed and form the Croton River proper.

Shortly after this confluence the Croton River is joined by another tributary, the Muscoot River, to form the Muscoot Reservoir, which spills without a break into the New Croton Reservoir. Water from it feeds the New Croton Aqueduct, which empties into the Jerome Park Reservoir in the Bronx before being distributed to New York City. Excess water in the New Croton Reservoir carries over the spillway at the New Croton Dam and empties into the Hudson River at Croton-on-Hudson, New York, at Croton Point, about 30 miles (50 km) north of New York City.

=== Waterways ===
- Croton River
  - West Branch
  - Middle Branch
  - East Branch
- Titicus River
- Muscoot River
- Cross River

=== Reservoirs ===
- Boyds Corner
- West Branch
- Middle Branch
- Croton Falls / Diverting
- East Branch / Bog Brook
- Titicus
- Cross River
- Amawalk
- Muscoot
- New Croton

=== Controlled lakes ===
- Kirk
- Gilead
- Gleneida

=== Aqueduct ===
- The New Croton Aqueduct

== See also ==
- Old Croton Aqueduct
- Catskill Aqueduct
- Delaware Aqueduct
- Water supply network
