= Diverting Reservoir =

- Location within New York Diverting Reservoir (the United States)
- Location: Putnam County, New York
- Coordinates: 41°23′01″N 73°37′48″W
- Type: reservoir
- Basin countries: United States
- Built: 1911
- Water volume: 900 million US gallons (3,400,000 m^{3})

The Diverting Reservoir is a reservoir in the New York City water supply system in the town of Southeast, New York, in Putnam County. Part of the system's Croton Watershed, it lies along the Middle Branch Croton River within about 35 miles (56 km) of New York City, and holds 900 million US gallons (3,400,000 m^{3}) of fresh water.

== Description ==
Construction of a 55-foot-high (17 m) dam impounding the East Branch Croton River began early in the 20th century and was completed by 1911. The drainage basin of the Diverting Reservoir represents 8 square miles (21 km^{2}) of the Croton River watershed; at full capacity the reservoir holds 900 million US gallons (3,400,000 m^{3}) of water, making it the smallest in the New York City water supply system outside the city itself.

The Diverting Reservoir is connected to the nearby Croton Falls Reservoir via a channel and dividing weir allowing water to freely pass between them, meaning it may potentially hold water from all three branches of the Croton River. A separate outflow from the reservoir drains into the continuation of the East Branch, which then joins the flow of the West Branch, itself carrying the flow of the Middle Branch, forming the Croton River proper.

The Croton River then picks up the outflows of the Titicus, Cross River, and Amawalk Reservoirs that all flow into the Muscoot Reservoir, the collecting point for most of the Croton Watershed. The Muscoot then gives way to a continuation of the Croton River, which continues into the New Croton Reservoir, the final collecting point. It then flows through the New Croton Aqueduct into the Jerome Park Reservoir, and from there is distributed in New York City.

In January 2007, the New York City Department of Environmental Protection began a $74 million project of improvements to the Croton Falls Reservoir and the Diverting Reservoir. The upgrading and rehabilitation is part of the city's effort to comply with state and federal dam safety regulations. The work at the Diverting Reservoir includes new valves and pipes, along with redoing the spillway and some of the concrete surfaces on the dam. The connecting channel between the two reservoirs will be emptied, inspected and dredged. Construction at both sites is expected to continue until Jan. 31, 2010.

== See also ==
- List of reservoirs and dams in New York
