= Lake Carmel (New York) =

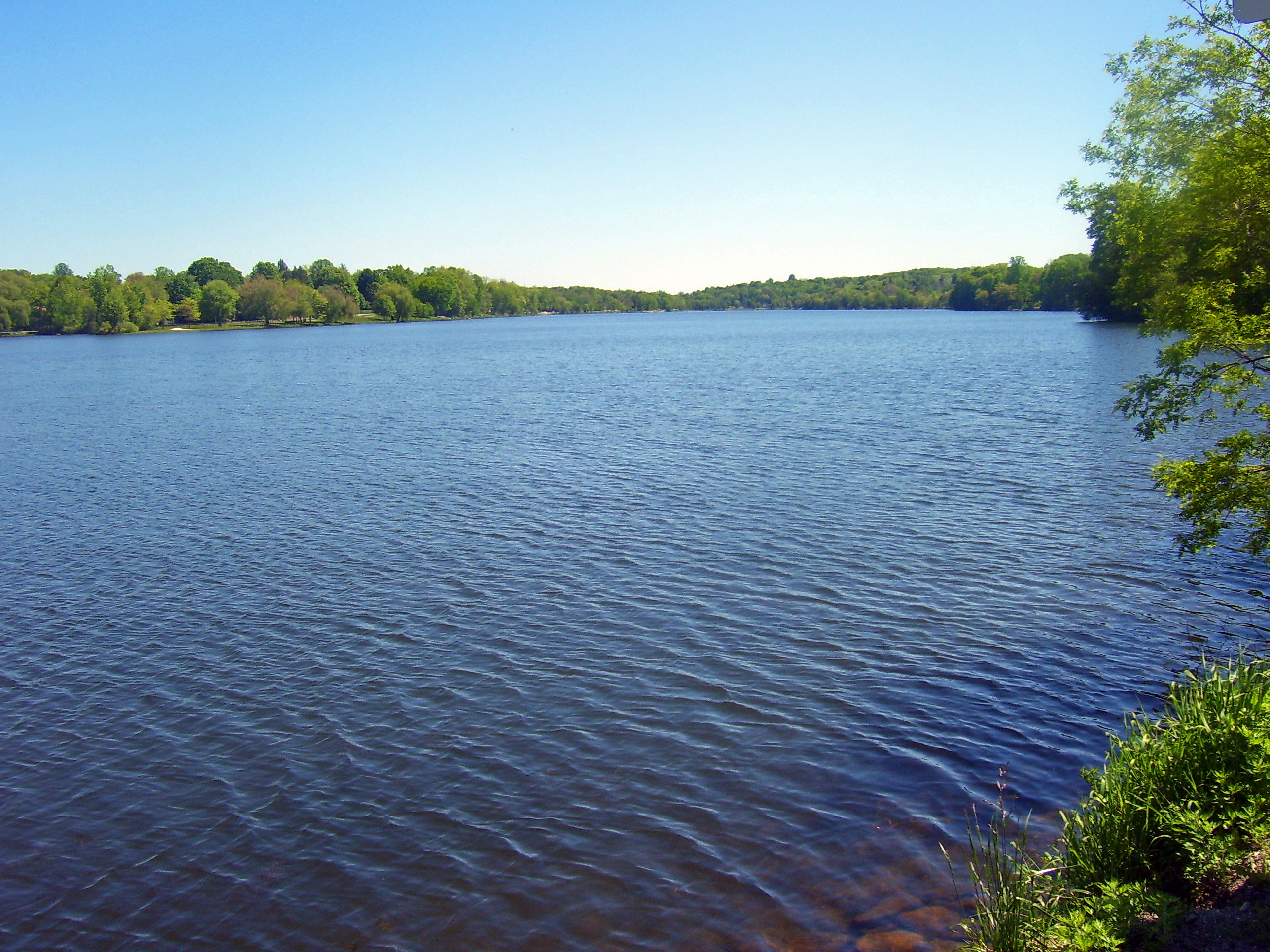
- Lake from the junction of New York State Routes 52 and 311

- Location within New York Location within the United States
- Location: Lake Carmel, New York
- Coordinates: 41°27′35″N 73°39′54″W
- Primary outflows: Middle Branch Croton River
- Catchment area: 13 sq mi (34 km^{2})
- Basin countries: United States
- Max. length: 1.9 mi (3.1 km)
- Max. width: 1,300 ft (400 m)
- Surface area: 200 acres (81 ha)
- Water volume: 2,790 acre⋅ft (3,440,000 m^{3})
- Surface elevation: 618 ft (188 m)

Lake Carmel is a small manmade lake located in the Town of Kent, in Putnam County, New York. It takes its name from the nearby town of Carmel, and in turn gives it to the community of Lake Carmel surrounding it.

The lake was created by developers in the early 20th century by damming the Middle Branch of the Croton River. It is one of the few sizeable bodies of water in the county not a part of the New York City water supply system, but its outfall goes straight into the system's Middle Branch Reservoir downstream in the town of Carmel. Due to increasing development around the lake, the city has helped the community improve its wastewater treatment.

== Geography ==
The lake is elongated in shape, longer along a north–south axis than it is wide, reflecting its artificial origins and its location in one of the valleys in a generally hilly area. There are two narrower inlets corresponding to the inflow streams at the north and northeast corners. A smaller inlet on the southwest corner bends slightly to the north, where it becomes swamps.

Lake Carmel and its associated community take up the southeast corner of Kent; most of the shoreline is developed and the residential neighborhoods surrounding it go several blocks inland, often gently rising up the surrounding hills, except for the steep, unnamed 1,104-foot (336 m) peak to the lake's west.

There are two inflow streams, neither named. The one that flows from the north-northwest rises in swamps a half-mile (800 m) the north; the northerly one ultimately rises in Bear Swamp, several miles to the north in the Dutchess County Town of Beekman, and then flows through several other lakes and ponds to get to Lake Carmel. The Middle Branch leaves the lake along its eastern shore, to be impounded again two miles (6.4 km) downstream.

Smadbeck Avenue (NY 52) closely follows the western shore near the northern and central sections of the lake; local roads such as Lakeshore Drive complete the circuit. NY 311 crosses the lake's northern inlet on a short causeway just before reaching its southern terminus at Route 52. Several other local roads, including Terry Hill Road (Putnam County Route 46), cross the eastern inlet, and Route 52 crosses the southwestern one. Interstate 84 is a mile to the northeast via Route 311, although the lake and the road cannot be seen from each other due to the intervening hills. Route 52 leads to Carmel a mile (1.6 km) to the south.

== History ==
In the late 19th century, Putnam County's lakes had become one of many places where city residents went on hot summer weekends. Brothers Warren and Arthur Smadbeck were developers who decided to create more. They bought failing farms in the area in 1928 and built the dam to create the lake. Around it they built small bungalows and cottages meant to be weekend or summer homes for middle-income families, selling them in lavish ads in the New York Daily Mirror. This continued through the 1940s. Eventually, 5,400 homes were built in the three square miles (8 km^{2}) around the lake, accounting for one-third of the town's housing stock.

In the years after the war, as automobile access to the region from the city increased with the opening of first the Taconic State Parkway and then Interstate 684, Lake Carmel became one of the earliest exurbs, home to more and more people year-round. The original cottages were expanded and winterized for this purpose.

As a result of the increasing, clustered development in the region, by 1999 the lake had attracted a large enough population of Canada geese to become a nuisance. Since they could not legally be hunted or shot due to the close proximity of dwellings, the town tried various means to control the population such as egg treatment and growing a lake buffer. It finally settled on rounding them up during molting season, when their ability to fly is limited, and slaughtering them. The meat was distributed to poor people as food. At that time it was only the second such time that action had been taken by a community in the Northeast.

Human-generated pollution of the lake and, by extension, New York City's watershed, also increased. Local communities resisted pressure from the city to install sewage treatment plants until the late 1990s, when more of those communities were relying on city water to handle their rapid development. In 2000 the city and the county reached a deal to build a plant to handle sewage from the many homes around the lake whose original septic systems were failing, and divert it to the Hudson River. Four years later the city also helped the town and county install stormwater control units along Route 52.

== Recreation ==
The town owns the lake, and those portions of its shoreline not under private ownership. Access to the beaches, or to the water for swimming, boating, fishing (and ice fishing in winter), is restricted to residents with permits or their guests.
