= Lake Carmel, New York =

- Census-designated place
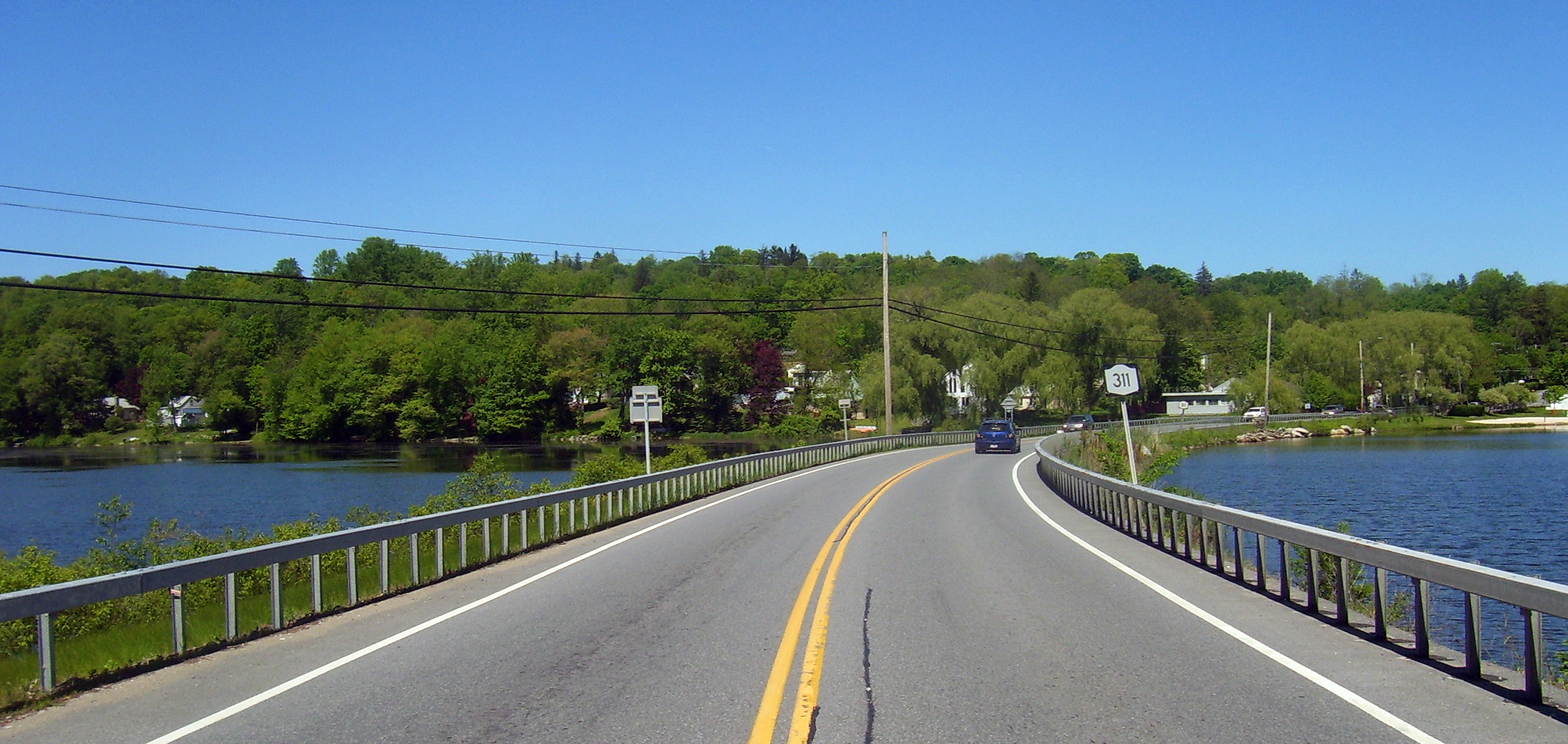
- NY Route 311 crossing Lake Carmel

- Location in Putnam County and the state of New York.
- Coordinates: 41°27′37″N 73°39′42″W
- Country: United States
- State: New York
- County: Putnam

Area
  - Total: 5.56 sq mi (14.39 km^{2})
  - Land: 5.22 sq mi (13.53 km^{2})
  - Water: 0.33 sq mi (0.86 km^{2})
- Elevation: 801 ft (244 m)

Population (2020)
  - Total: 8,069
  - Density: 1,544.4/sq mi (596.29/km^{2})
- Time zone: UTC-5 (Eastern (EST))
  - Summer (DST): UTC-4 (EDT)
- ZIP code: 10512
- Area code: 845
- FIPS code: 36-40398
- GNIS feature ID: 0954900

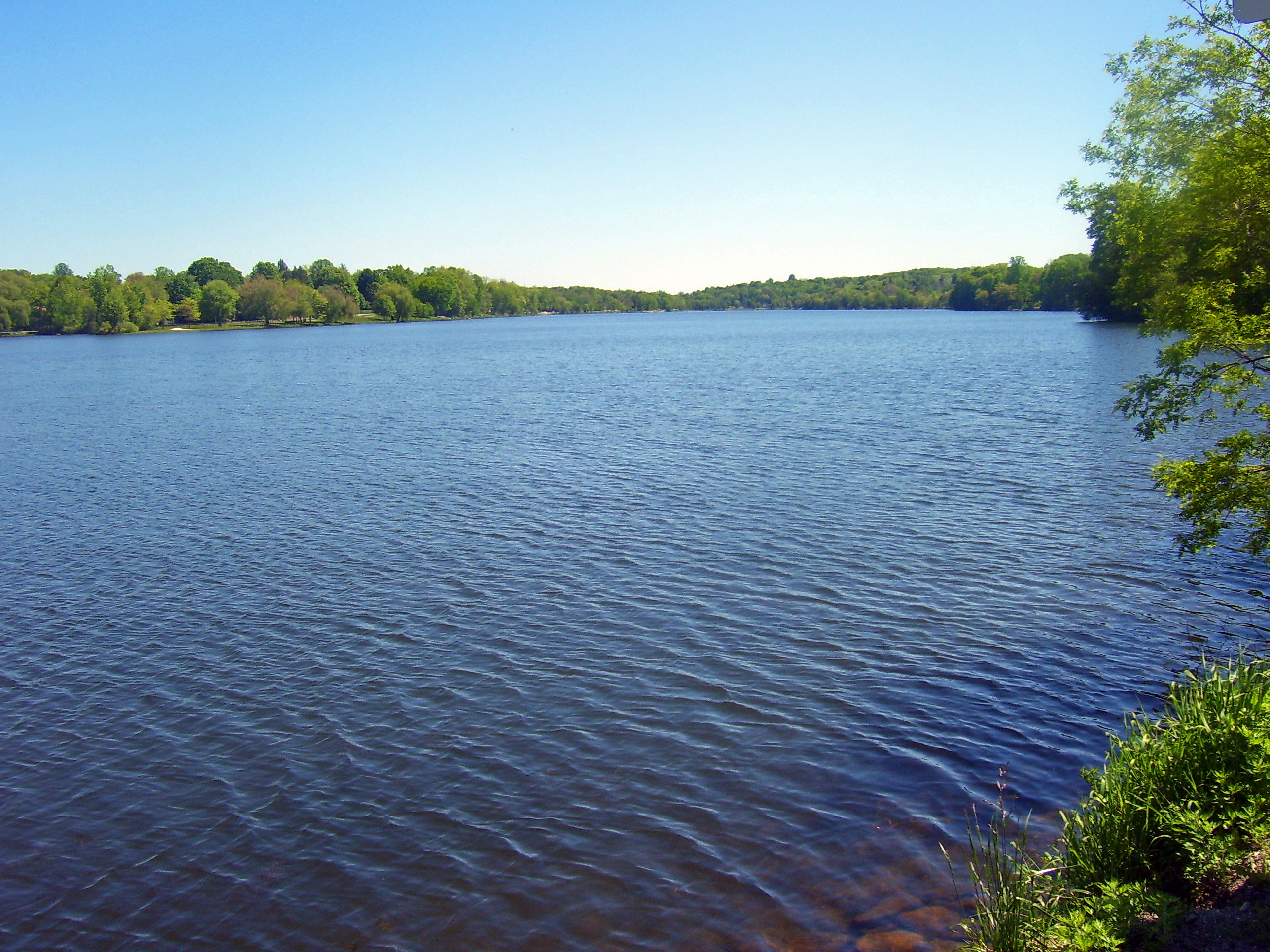
Lake Carmel from the junction of New York State Routes 52 and 311

Lake Carmel is a hamlet and census-designated place in the town of Kent in Putnam County, New York, United States. As of the 2020 census, Lake Carmel had a population of 8,069. The hamlet is centered around Lake Carmel, a 1.6 mile long manmade lake in the southeastern corner of the township and just north of hamlet of Carmel within the town of Carmel.

The lake and surrounding community was developed by the Smadbeck brothers, who excavated and dammed a swamp in the 1920s and sold lots through the now-defunct New York Daily Mirror. The hamlet is the seat of the volunteer Lake Carmel Fire Department; its fire district covers the eastern half of the township, and of the Kent town government.

== Geography ==
Lake Carmel is located at 41°27′37″N 73°39′42″W (41.460268, -73.661663). According to the United States Census Bureau, the community has a total area of 5.5 square miles (14 km^{2}), of which 5.2 square miles (13 km^{2}) is land and 0.3 square miles (0.78 km^{2}), or 6.35%, is water.

The community is west of Interstate 84, accessed at Exits 58 and 61. Lake Carmel mail can be addressed to Carmel or Kent Lakes as well as Lake Carmel.

== Demographics ==
Historical population
Census	Pop.	Note	%±
2020	8,069		—
U.S. Decennial Census

=== 2020 census ===
As of the 2020 census, Lake Carmel had a population of 8,069. The median age was 43.6 years. 19.9% of residents were under the age of 18 and 17.7% of residents were 65 years of age or older. For every 100 females there were 98.6 males, and for every 100 females age 18 and over there were 96.6 males age 18 and over.

92.9% of residents lived in urban areas, while 7.1% lived in rural areas.

There were 3,039 households in Lake Carmel, of which 31.5% had children under the age of 18 living in them. Of all households, 55.1% were married-couple households, 16.5% were households with a male householder and no spouse or partner present, and 23.2% were households with a female householder and no spouse or partner present. About 22.2% of all households were made up of individuals and 10.0% had someone living alone who was 65 years of age or older.

There were 3,258 housing units, of which 6.7% were vacant. The homeowner vacancy rate was 1.3% and the rental vacancy rate was 4.7%.

Racial composition as of the 2020 census
Race	Number	Percent
White	5,716	70.8%
Black or African American	290	3.6%
American Indian and Alaska Native	66	0.8%
Asian	174	2.2%
Native Hawaiian and Other Pacific Islander	0	0.0%
Some other race	873	10.8%
Two or more races	950	11.8%
Hispanic or Latino (of any race)	2,049	25.4%

=== 2000 census ===
As of the census of 2000, there were 8,663 people, 3,019 households, and 2,351 families residing in the region. The population density was 1,678.0 inhabitants per square mile (647.9/km^{2}). There were 3,167 housing units at an average density of 613.4 per square mile (236.8/km^{2}). The racial makeup of the CDP was 93.96% White, 1.50% African American, 0.17% Native American, 0.84% Asian, 0.02% Pacific Islander, 1.93% from other races, and 1.57% from two or more races. Hispanic or Latino of any race were 6.22% of the population.

There were 3,019 households, out of which 38.5% had children under the age of 18 living with them, 63.7% were married couples living together, 10.3% had a female householder with no husband present, and 22.1% were non-families. 17.0% of all households were made up of individuals, and 5.1% had someone living alone who was 65 years of age or older. The average household size was 2.87 and the average family size was 3.25.

In the community, the population was spread out, with 27.0% under the age of 18, 6.5% from 18 to 24, 33.1% from 25 to 44, 24.5% from 45 to 64, and 8.8% who were 65 years of age or older. The median age was 37 years. For every 100 females, there were 98.1 males. For every 100 females age 18 and over, there were 93.9 males.

The median income for a household in the area was $70,678, and the median income for a family was $76,514. Males had a median income of $49,615 versus $37,292 for females. The per capita income for the CDP was $27,253. About 3.9% of families and 3.8% of the population were below the poverty line, including 4.2% of those under age 18 and 6.9% of those age 65 or over.

== Education ==
The census-designated place is in the Carmel Central School District.
