= Stewart's Dam =

Dam in Hadley, New York

Coordinates: 43.2985°N 73.8873°W

Stewart's Dam was built in 1950 in Hadley, New York on the Sacandaga River. It holds back the Stewart Bridge Reservoir and is one of the largest reservoirs in America to be contained by an earthen dam.
