= West Branch Croton River =

Coordinates: 41°20′49″N 73°39′51″W

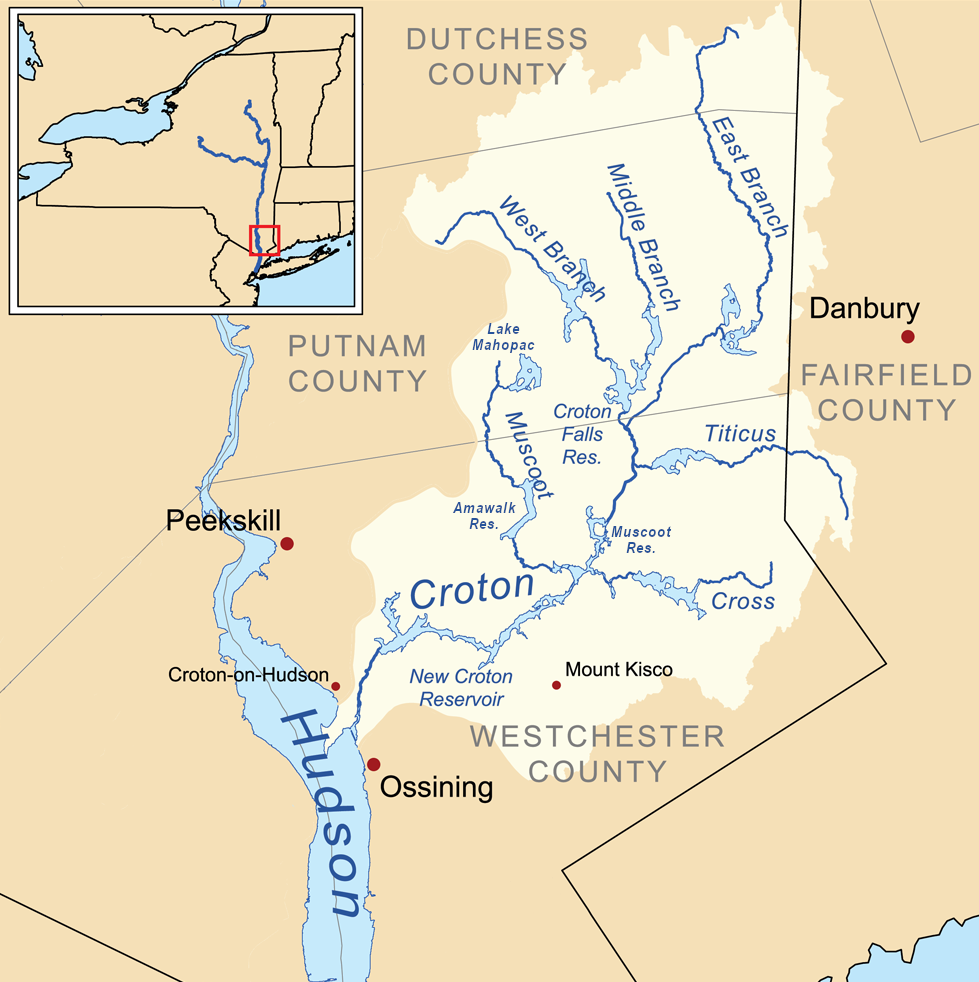
Map of the Croton River watershed showing the West Branch

The West Branch Croton River is a tributary of the Croton River in Putnam and Westchester counties in the state of New York. It lies within the Croton River watershed and is part of the New York City water supply system's Croton Watershed.

== Path ==
The rivers headwaters drain into Sagamore Lake in the northwest part of the town of Kent in Putnam County. From there the West Branch flows southeast one mile into Boyds Corner Reservoir, where it joins the New York City water supply system. From Boyd's Corners it flows into West Branch Reservoir in the towns of Kent and Carmel, New York. The West Branch Reservoir was put into service in late 1895 when the Carmel Dam was built, fully submerging the Colonial hamlet of Coles Mills. It then flows southeast into the Croton Falls Reservoir in Carmel immediately above the Westchester border, where it picks up the waters of the Middle Branch Croton River after their co-mingling in the Diverting Reservoir immediately to the north. These combined waters exit the Croton Falls Reservoir for a brief stretch of the West Branch alone, which joins the East Branch at the confluence of the Croton River proper in Croton Falls, a hamlet of the town of North Salem, New York in northern Westchester County.

== See also ==
- List of rivers of New York
