= Lake Gilead =

Lake in Putnam County, New York, United States

- Location within New York
- Location: Carmel, New York
- Coordinates: 41°23′52″N 73°40′32″W
- Basin countries: United States
- Surface area: 118 acres (48 ha)
- Average depth: 43 ft (13 m)
- Max. depth: 120 ft (37 m)
- Shore length^{1}: 2.2 mi (3.5 km)
- Surface elevation: 499 ft (152 m)
- ^{1} Shore length is not a well-defined measure.

Lake Gilead is a 118-acre (0.48 km^{2}) controlled lake located in hamlet of Carmel within the Town of Carmel in Putnam County, New York. Originally known as Dean's Pond, it was dammed by New York City in 1870 to create an impoundment 0.8 miles long, with a mean depth of 43 feet (13 m) and a maximum depth of approximately 120 feet (37 m). The lake is located within the lower Hudson River basin in the Croton River watershed. It lies at an elevation of 499 ft (152 m), and has a shoreline of approximately 2.2 mi (3.5 km).

Lake Gilead is part of the Croton Watershed of the New York City water supply system. Its dam and spillway are located on its southern end, with a 500' shore-to-shore set-back restricting boaters from the spillway area.

Recreational use of the controlled lakes falls under DEP regulations. Fishing and self-powered boating are allowed with a valid DEP permit and New York State Department of Environmental Conservation-issued fishing license. Swimming is prohibited.

Ice fishing is allowed on Lake Gilead during the winter. Fish species present include (but are not limited to) largemouth bass, rainbow, lake and brown trout, chain pickerel, yellow perch, and panfish. In the 1990s a local fisherman illegally introduced northern pike, though they are rarely caught.
