= East Branch Croton River =

River in the U.S. state of New York

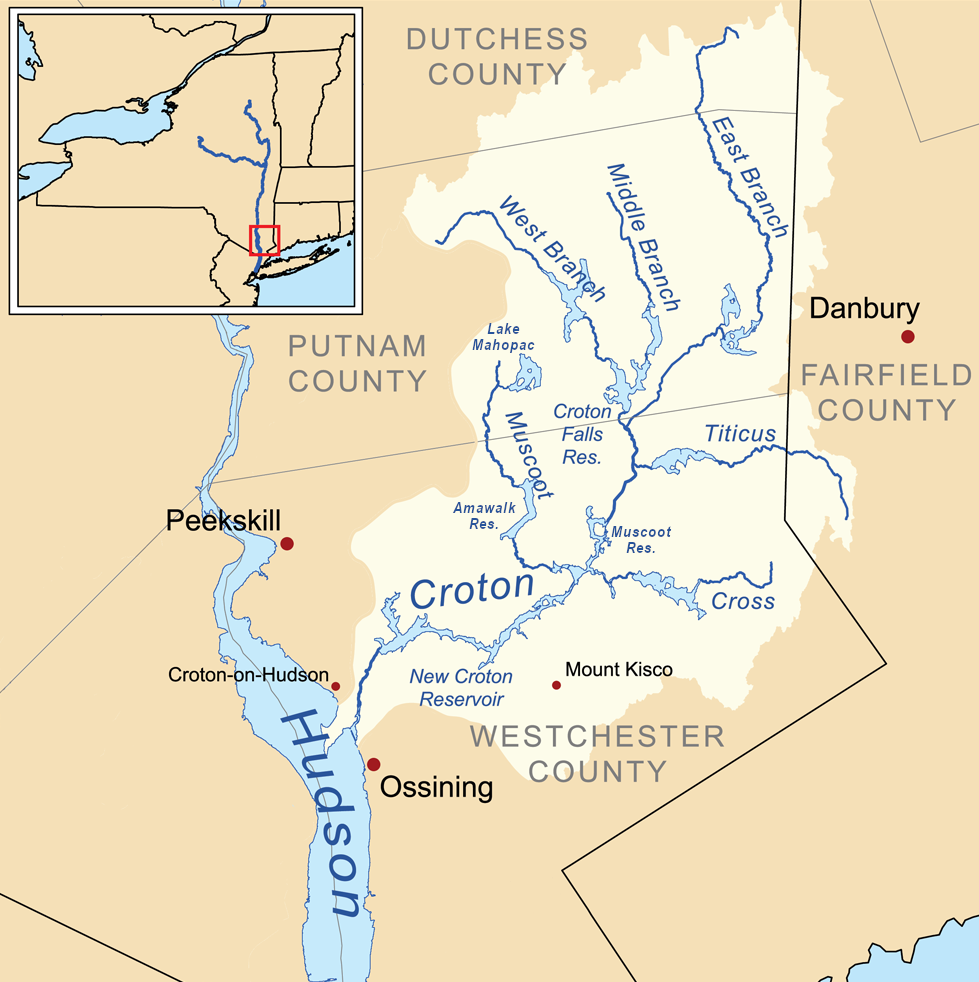
- Map of the Croton River watershed showing the East Branch to the northeast

Location
- Country: United States
- State: New York
- Counties: Dutchess, Putnam, Westchester

Physical characteristics
- Source
  - location: near Pawling
  - coordinates: 41.56379°N 73.57310°W
- Mouth: confluence with West Branch Croton River
  - location: near Croton Falls
  - coordinates: 41.34698°N 73.66421°W

Basin features
- Progression: Croton → Hudson → New York Harbor
- River system: Croton River watershed
- Cities: Pawling; Brewster
- Waterbodies: East Branch Reservoir; Diverting Reservoir

The East Branch Croton River is a tributary of the Croton River in Dutchess, Putnam, and Westchester counties in the state of New York. It lies within the Croton River watershed and is part of the New York City water supply system's Croton Watershed.

== Path ==
The river rises in the town of Pawling in Dutchess County, flowing west and then south through the village of Pawling. It crosses into Putnam County, flowing through the Great Swamp in the town of Patterson. It then flows south, west and southwest through the town of Southeast, passing through the East Branch Reservoir, the village of Brewster, and the Diverting Reservoir. Finally, it crosses into Westchester County, joining the West Branch Croton River at the hamlet of Croton Falls in North Salem to form the main Croton River.

== See also ==
- List of rivers of New York
