= Amawalk Reservoir =

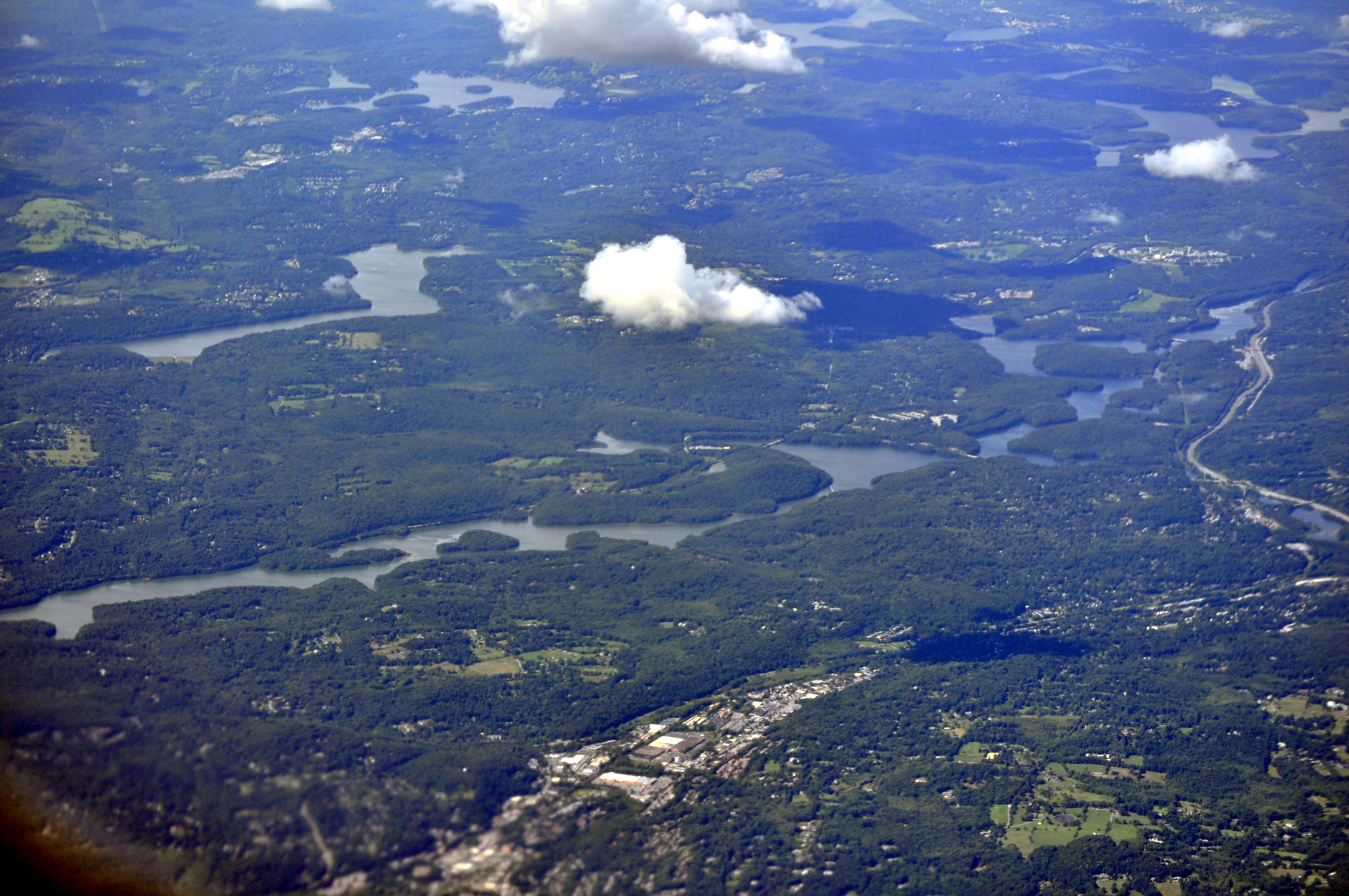
- Amawalk Reservoir can be seen at left center of this 2013 aerial photograph of nearby Muscoot Reservoir. Amawalk Reservoir is immediately left of the cloud at center.

- Location within New York Location within the United States
- Location: Westchester County, New York
- Coordinates: 41°18′15″N 73°44′20″W
- Type: reservoir
- Catchment area: 20 sq mi (52 km^{2})
- Basin countries: United States
- Built: 1897
- Max. length: 3 mi (4.8 km)
- Surface area: 579 acres (2.34 km^{2})
- Average depth: 36 feet (11 m)
- Max. depth: 60 feet (18 m)
- Water volume: 6.7 billion US gal (25,000,000 m^{3})
- Surface elevation: 397 ft (121 m)

The Amawalk Reservoir is a reservoir in the New York City water supply system located in central-northern Westchester County, New York. Part of the system's Croton Watershed, it is located at the intersection of U.S. Route 202 and New York State Route 35 in the town of Somers, approximately 32 miles (51 kilometres) north of New York City. The reservoir is named after the original community of Amawalk, New York, which was inundated by its construction and relocated near its dam.

== Description ==
The Amawalk Reservoir was formed by impounding the middle of the Muscoot River, one of the tributaries of the Croton River, and put into service in 1897.

The reservoir has a drainage basin of 20 square miles (52 square kilometres). About 3 miles (4.8 kilometres) long and narrow, it holds about 6.7 billion US gal (25 million m^{3}) of water at full capacity, making it one of the smaller in NYC's water supply system.

Water either released or spilled out of Amawalk flows south in the Muscoot River to its confluence with the Muscoot Reservoir, a collecting point for the Amawalk, Titicus, and Cross River Reservoirs. The Muscoot flows into the New Croton Reservoir, where the New Croton Aqueduct carries the Croton Watershed water to the Jerome Park Reservoir in the Bronx for distribution to the Bronx and northern Manhattan.

On average, the New Croton Aqueduct delivers 10% of New York City's drinking water. Excess passing over the New Croton Dam spillway flows back into the Croton River and drains into the Hudson River at Croton Point.

== See also ==
- List of reservoirs and dams in New York
