= Croton Falls Reservoir =

- Location within New York Croton Falls Reservoir (the United States)
- Location: Putnam County, New York
- Coordinates: 41°22′19″N 73°40′09″W
- Type: reservoir
- Primary inflows: West Branch and Middle Branch of the Croton River
- Catchment area: 16 sq mi (41 km^{2})
- Basin countries: United States
- Built: 1911
- Surface area: 603 acres (244 ha)
- Water volume: 14.2 billion U.S. gallons (54 million cubic meters)
- Surface elevation: 308 ft (94 m)

The Croton Falls Reservoir is a reservoir in the New York City water supply system in the Putnam County, New York townships of Carmel, and Southeast, roughly 50 miles (80 km) north of New York City. Part of the system's Croton Watershed, it was formed by impounding the West Branch and Middle Branch of the Croton River, tributaries of the Croton River, which flows into the Hudson River.

Placed into service in 1911, the resulting reservoir has a drainage basin of 16 square miles (25.6 km²) and can hold 14.2 billion US gallons (54,000,000 m^{3}) of water at full capacity. This includes all bodies of water that flow into the reservoir except for other reservoirs. Water sources in the basin include Michaels Brook, and Lake Gilead, one of three controlled lakes in the Croton Watershed. The reservoir is split into three portions by Putnam County Routes 35 and 38, which cross it with causeways and bridges.

Water from the reservoir flows into Westchester County, New York, through the Muscoot Reservoir and New Croton Reservoir before entering the New Croton Aqueduct. Water in the Aqueduct flows through The Bronx into the Jerome Park Reservoir.

In January 2007, the New York City Department of Environmental Protection reportedly began a $74 million project of improvements to the Croton Falls Reservoir and the Diverting Reservoir. The upgrading and rehabilitation is part of the city's effort to comply with state and federal dam safety regulations. At the Croton Falls Reservoir, the spillway - the structure that allows excess water to leave the reservoir - has been widened and deepened. The nearly 100-foot-tall (30 m) earthen and masonry dam has been resurfaced, a new bridge has been built over the redone spillway and various mechanical items, such as valves, will be replaced. In addition, cables anchoring the dam and spillway to the bedrock will be installed. The work will require the reservoir to be deepened 4 feet (1.2 m). The connecting channel between the two reservoirs has been emptied, inspected and dredged. Construction at both sites has continued until Jan. 31, 2010.

Recent developments regarding the Croton Falls Reservoir include a significant legal settlement that reduced the assessed value of the reservoir, impacting the surrounding communities, particularly the Town of Carmel and the Mahopac School District. The reservoir, managed by New York City, had its value decreased by $80 million following a court decision. This ruling, which gradually reduces the assessment through 2032, means a loss of tax revenue for the local municipalities, though they will not need to pay back taxes from previous years.

== See also ==
- List of reservoirs and dams in New York
