= Controlled lake =

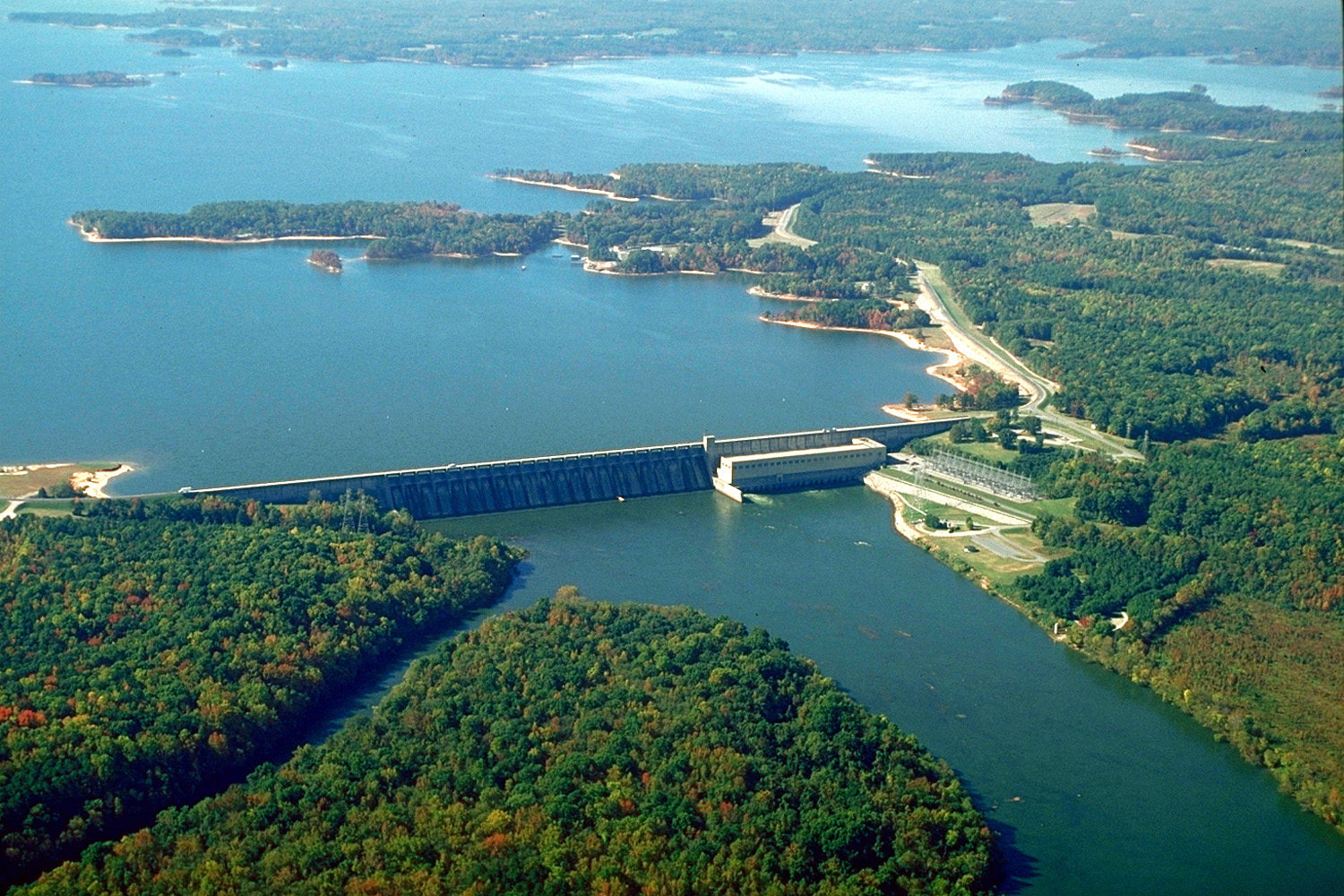
Kerr Lake on the Roanoke River in Mecklenburg County, Virginia, is a manmade lake controlled by a dam

A controlled lake is both a general and specific term to describe a body of water. In its general sense it describes a lake or reservoir which has its water level controlled by some form of dam. In the specific, it refers to three small lakes within the New York City water supply system's Croton Watershed lying within central Putnam County in the state's far southwestern corner.

== Types ==
=== Control of water level ===
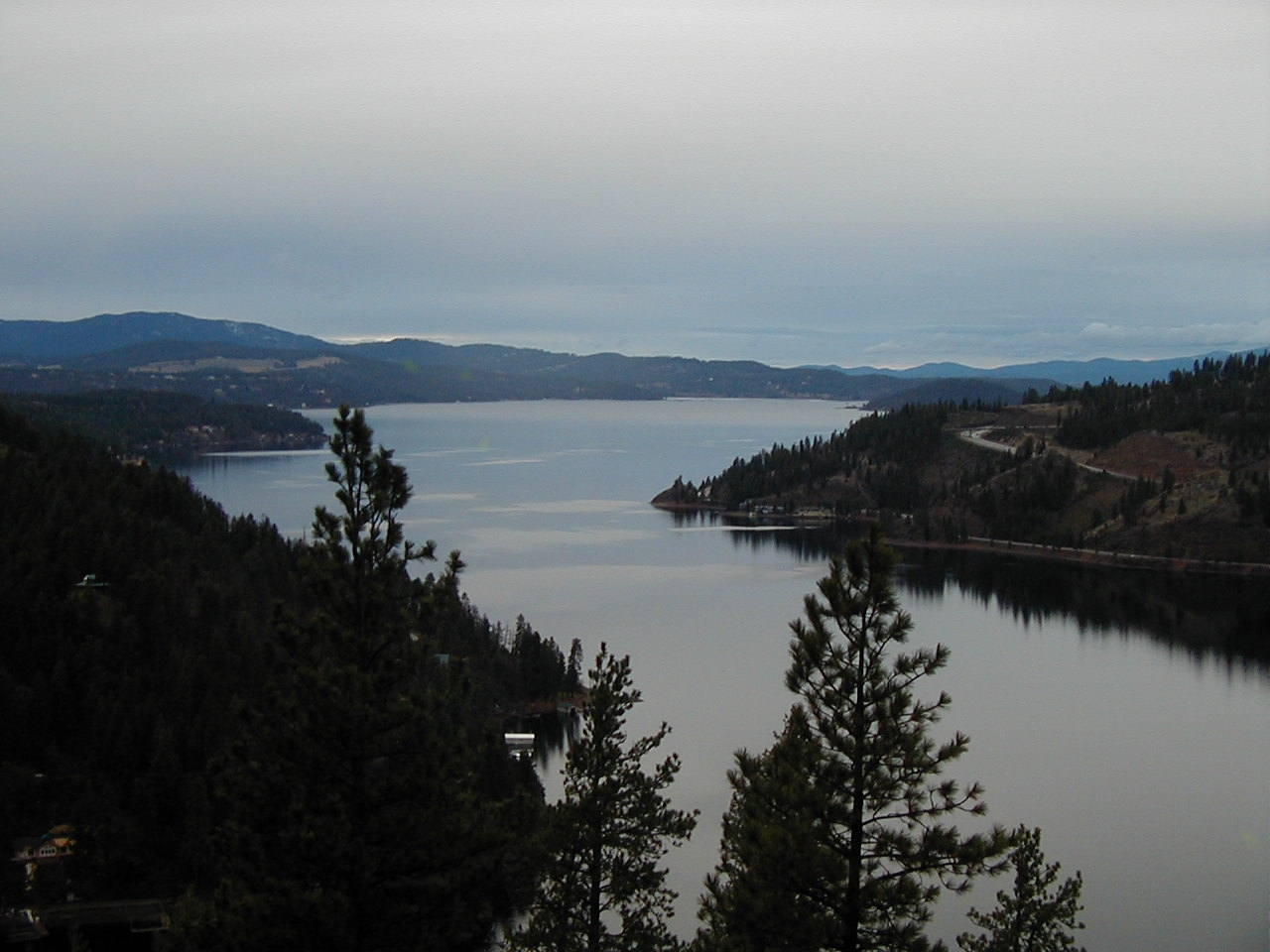
The water level of Lake Coeur d'Alene in Idaho is controlled by the downstream Post Falls Dam

The term "controlled lake" is used to describe a body of water – whether a natural lake enlarged by emplacement of a dam, a formerly dry area flooded and dammed, or a stretch in a natural watercourse such as a stream or river dammed to create a manmade impoundment – that has its level controlled by a dam.

The purpose of the dam – whether to generate electricity, manage flood control, provide water for drinking, irrigation or recreational opportunities, increase shoreline real estate values, or any combination thereof – does not matter; nor does the size of dam or water body created, which can vary between an oversized pond controlled by a floodgate or the nearly 250 sq mi (650 km^{2}) Lake Mead impounded by the Hoover Dam, only that the water body's water level is artificially controlled.

Last, it does not matter whether the water body is referred to as a "lake" when in reality it is a reservoir; that is merely a matter of convention, often tracing back to the body's name in its natural state.

=== New York City watershed ===
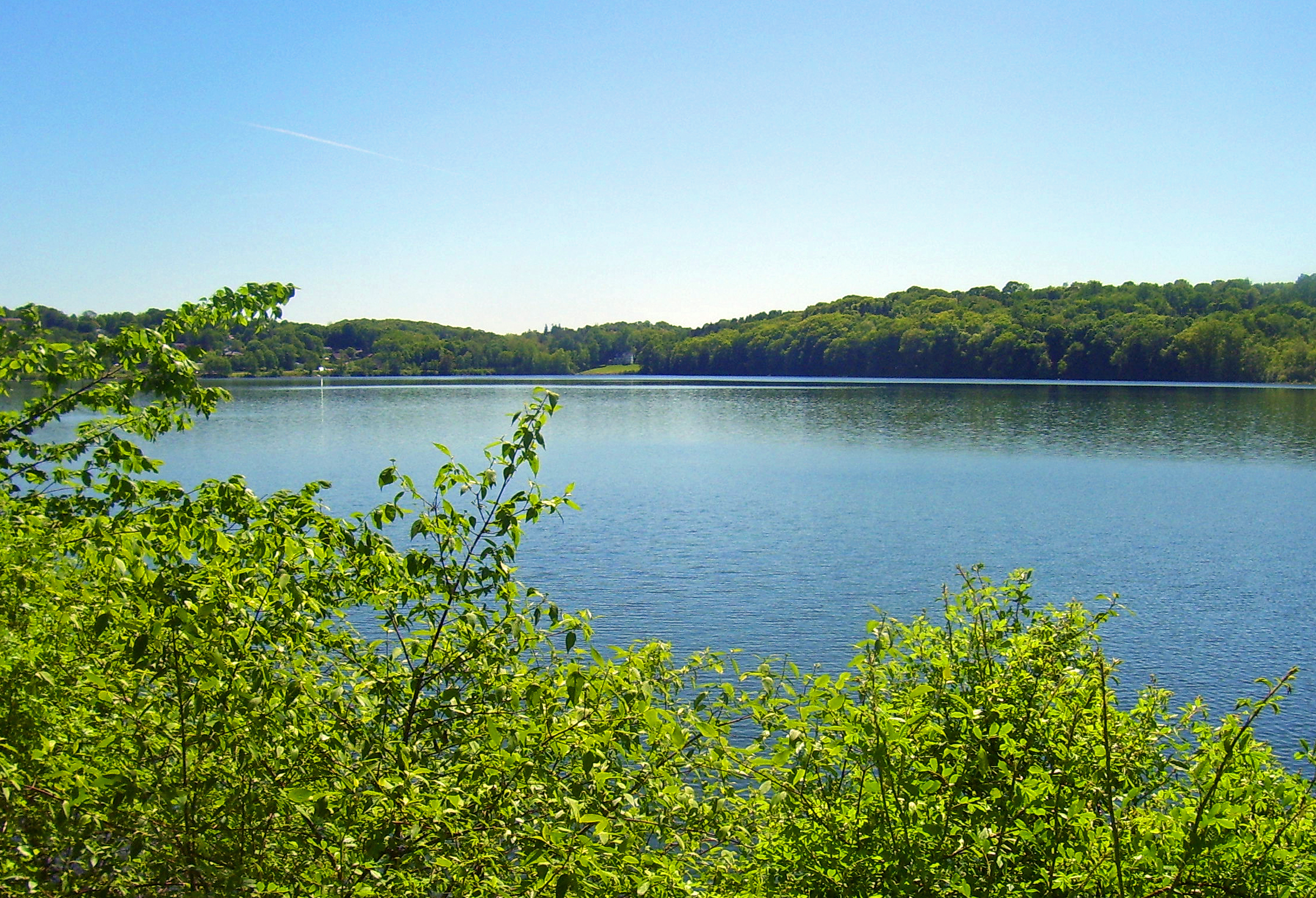
Lake Gleneida in Carmel, New York, is one of the New York City water supply system's three controlled lakes

The term "controlled lake" is used by the New York City water supply system to describe three small auxiliary reservoirs within its Croton Watershed which it either owns or has rights to draw water from. These are Lake Gleneida and Lake Gilead in the hamlet of Carmel, and Kirk Lake in the hamlet of Mahopac, all three within the town of Carmel in Putnam County, New York.

Each has a dam and spillway controlling its outflow. "Controlled" further applies to controlled access and controlled use, in order to protect the sanitation of the drinking water supply they potentially contain.

The three lakes fall under the jurisdiction of the New York City Department of Environmental Protection's Bureau of Water Supply, which manages, operates and protects the city's upstate water supply system. The City may withdraw water from the "controlled lakes" pursuant to rights acquired by the City or as a right of ownership.

Recreational use of the controlled lakes falls under DEP regulations; its guidelines and requirements are listed here. Fishing and self-powered boating are allowed with a valid DEP permit and New York State Department of Environmental Conservation-issued fishing license. Swimming is prohibited. These regulations do not apply to Kirk Lake which allows recreational fishing, boating, and swimming without a permit.

== See also ==
- Reservoir
- Water right
