= Muscoot Reservoir =

Reservoir in New York state, USA

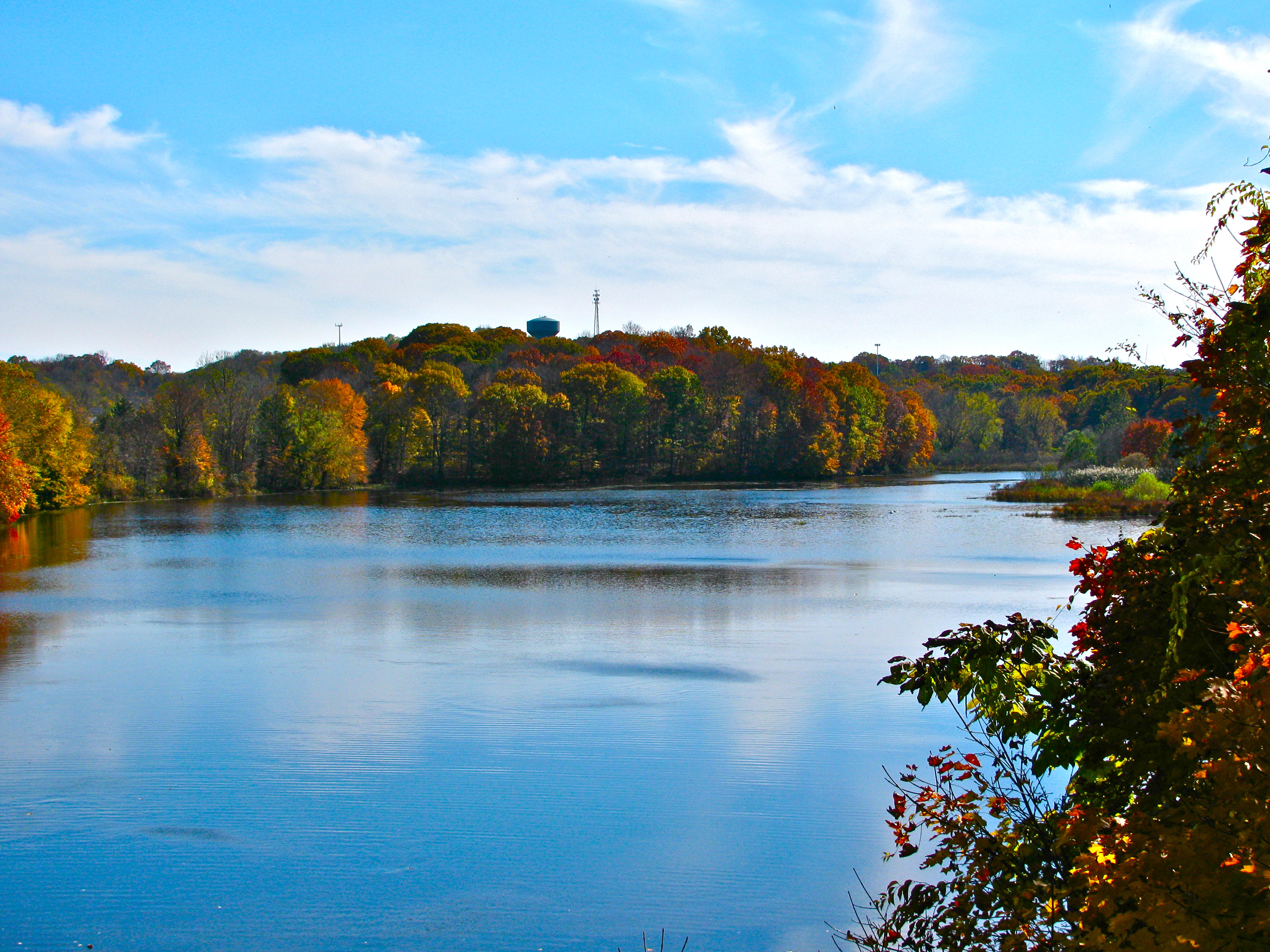
- In October 2009

- Location within New York
- Location: Westchester County, New York
- Coordinates: 41.269°N 73.707°W
- Type: Reservoir
- Catchment area: 76 sq mi (200 km^{2})
- Basin countries: United States
- Built: 1905
- Surface area: 1,263 acres (511 ha)
- Max. depth: 30 ft (9.1 m)
- Water volume: 4.9 billion U.S. gallons (19 million cubic meters)
- Shore length^{1}: 30.5 mi (49.1 km)
- Surface elevation: 200 ft (61 m)
- ^{1} Shore length is not a well-defined measure.

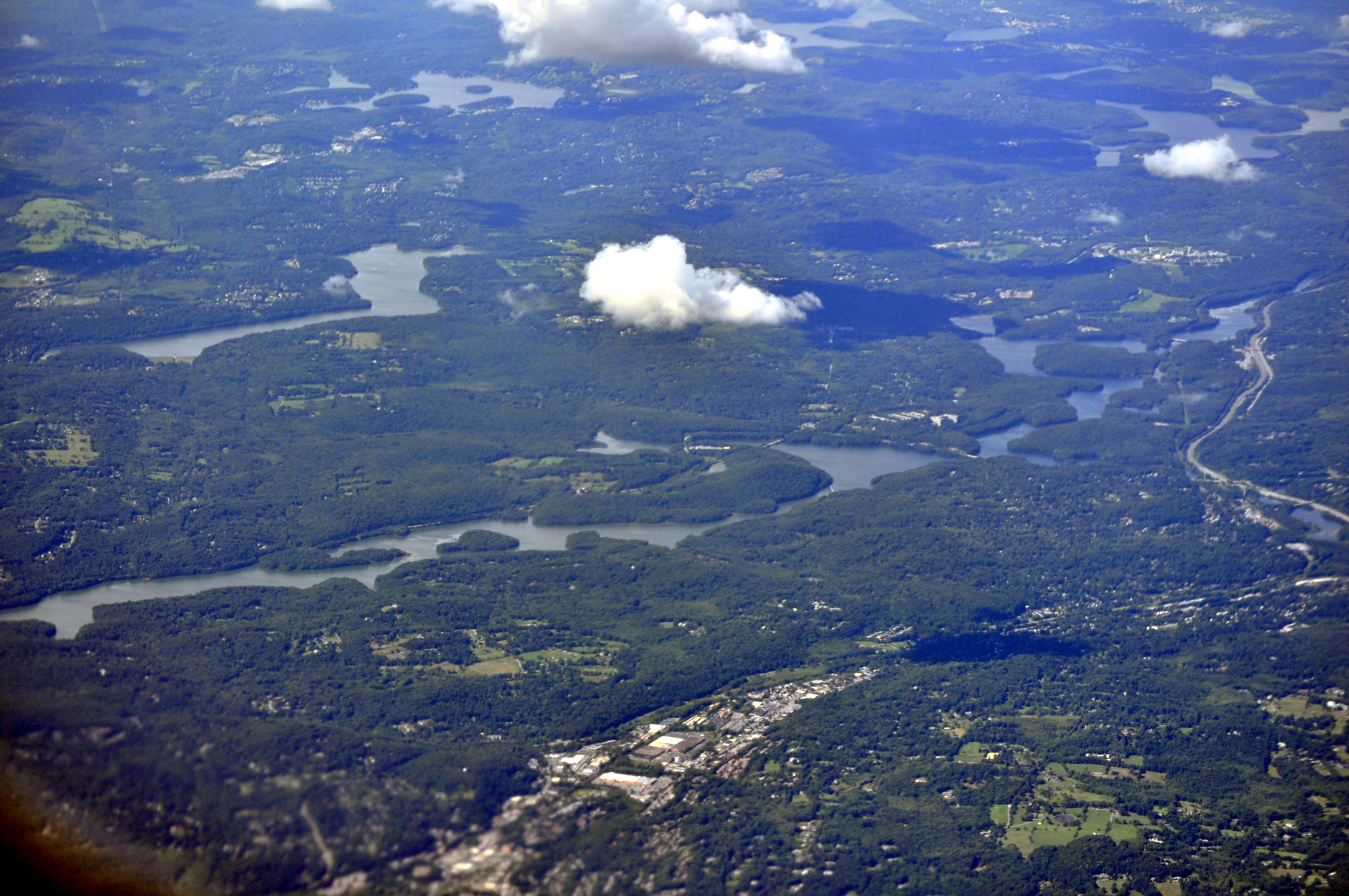
Muscoot Reservoir cuts across this 2013 aerial photograph from lower left to center and upper right. At center left is Amawalk Reservoir (which drains into Muscoot Reservoir) at upper right is Lake Mahopac. Mount Kisco, New York is at bottom center and near center right are Katonah, New York and Interstate 684.

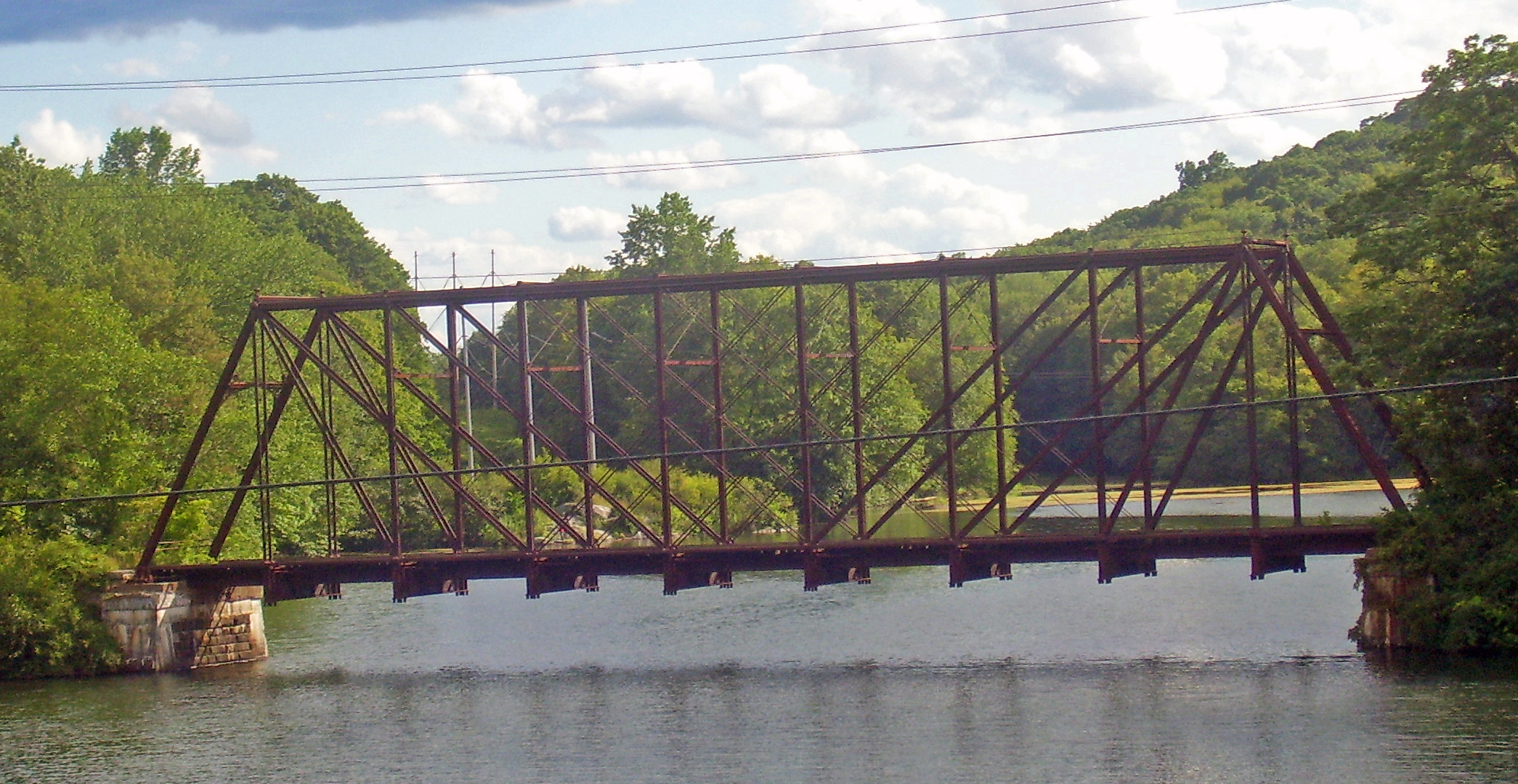
Historic Whipple truss Bridge L-158 spanning the reservoir in Goldens Bridge, New York (August 2008)

The Muscoot Reservoir is a reservoir in the New York City water supply system in northern Westchester County, New York, located directly north of the village of Katonah. Part of the system's Croton Watershed, it is 25 miles (40 kilometres) north of the City.

== History ==
The reservoir was constructed at the beginning of the 20th century, and was completed in 1905. It was formed by impounding both the Muscoot River, a tributary of the Croton River, and the Croton River proper, a tributary of the Hudson River. The Muscoot's waters drain into the New Croton Reservoir, where they are carried through the New Croton Aqueduct into the Bronx for distribution in New York City.

During construction, the New York Central Railroad moved Bridge L-158 from the Rondout Creek near Kingston to carry its Mahopac Branch across a section of the reservoir near Goldens Bridge. It remains today, although service on the branch ended in 1960.

In 1978, Bridge L-158 was listed on the National Register of Historic Places as the only remaining double-intersection Whipple truss railroad bridge in the state.

== Geography ==
The reservoir was once much smaller, but the other side of the original dam was intentionally flooded to make the reservoir bigger, when a new dam was built downstream. The original dam is still standing, and divides the reservoir in two.

The reservoir serves as the first main collecting point for all the reservoirs in the Croton Watershed. It is almost 8 miles (13 km) long, can hold up to 4.9 billion US gallons (19,000,000 cubic metres; 19 billion litres) of water at full capacity, and has a 76-square-mile (197 km^{2}) drainage basin.

Water from the Muscoot Reservoir flows into the New Croton Reservoir. From there it enters the New Croton Aqueduct and flows south into the Jerome Park Reservoir in The Bronx. Water from the Croton Aqueduct is distributed within the city to parts of The Bronx, Manhattan, and western Queens.

Fish species found in the reservoir include largemouth bass, smallmouth bass, brown bullhead, common carp, black crappie, yellow perch, chain pickerel, sunfish, brown trout, and rainbow trout.

== See also ==
- List of reservoirs and dams in New York
