= Croton =

Croton may refer to:

== Biology ==
- Crotoneae, a tribe of the flowering plant subfamily Crotonoideae
- Croton (plant), a plant genus of the family Euphorbiaceae
  - Croton capitatus, also known as the woolly croton
  - Croton hancei, a species of Croton endemic to Hong Kong
- Caperonia, a genus of plants of the family Euphorbiaceae commonly known as "false croton"
- Codiaeum variegatum, an ornamental plant in the genus Codiaeum, formerly classified in the genus Croton, and commonly called "croton"
- German cockroach (Blattella germanica), known as the Croton bug

== Places ==
=== In Italy ===
- Croton or Kroton, ancient Crotone, a city in Calabria
- Crotone Airport, an airport serving the above city
- Province of Crotone, a province in Calabria

=== In the United States ===
==== In New York ====
- Croton-on-Hudson, New York, a village in Westchester County
  - Croton–Harmon (Metro-North station)
  - Croton North Railroad Station
  - Croton Point, a peninsula in the Hudson River
- Croton Falls, a hamlet in North Salem, New York
  - Croton Falls (Metro-North station)
- New Croton reservoir, in Westchester County
  - New Croton Dam, the dam creating the above reservoir
    - New Croton aqueduct, a water distribution system constructed for New York City
      - Old Croton Aqueduct, a water distribution system constructed for New York City which was replaced by the above aqueduct
        - Old Croton Trail, following the path of the Old Croton Aqueduct
    - Old Croton Dam, a historic dam that the above dam has replaced
- Croton Gorge Park, in Westchester County
- Croton River, a tributary of the Hudson River
- Croton Falls Reservoir, in Putnam County
- Croton Expressway, a freeway in Westchester County

==== Elsewhere ====
- Croton Dam (Michigan), on the Muskegon River
- Croton Township, Michigan, in Newaygo County
- Croton, New Jersey
- Hartford, Ohio, a village whose post office is named Croton, Ohio
- Croton Creek, in Texas

== Other uses ==
- Croton oil (Crotonis Oleum), an oil prepared from the seeds of Croton tiglium
- Crotonaldehyde, or 2-butenal, an unsaturated aldehyde
- Crotonic acid, trans-2-butenoic acid,
- Battle of Crotona, 204 BC
- F.C. Crotone, a football club based in Crotone, Italy

== See also ==
- Crotone (fungus), a genus of fungus in the family Venturiaceae
- Crouton, a small piece of toasted bread
- Groton (disambiguation)
- Kroton (disambiguation)
