= Cross River Reservoir =

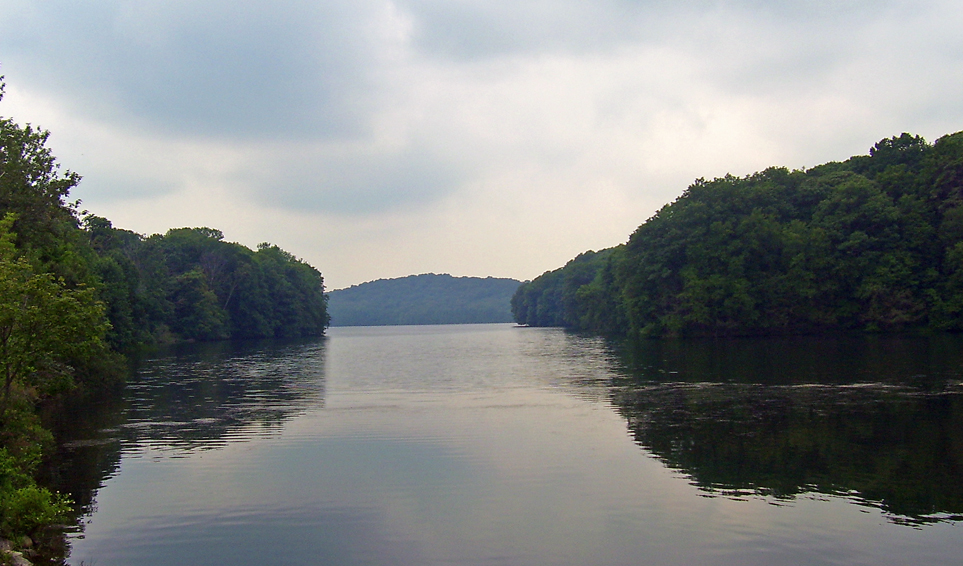
- East end of the reservoir

- Location within New York Location within the United States
- Location: Westchester County, New York
- Coordinates: 41°15′15″N 73°37′58″W
- Type: reservoir
- Primary inflows: Cross River
- Primary outflows: Cross River
- Catchment area: 30 sq mi (78 km^{2})
- Basin countries: United States
- Built: 1908
- Max. length: 3.2 mi (5.1 km)
- Max. width: 0.61 mi (0.98 km)
- Surface area: 915 acres (370 ha)
- Average depth: 36 ft (11 m)
- Max. depth: 120 ft (37 m)
- Water volume: 10.3 billion U.S. gallons (39 million cubic meters)
- Shore length^{1}: 12.4 mi (20.0 km)
- Surface elevation: 331 ft (101 m)
- ^{1} Shore length is not a well-defined measure.

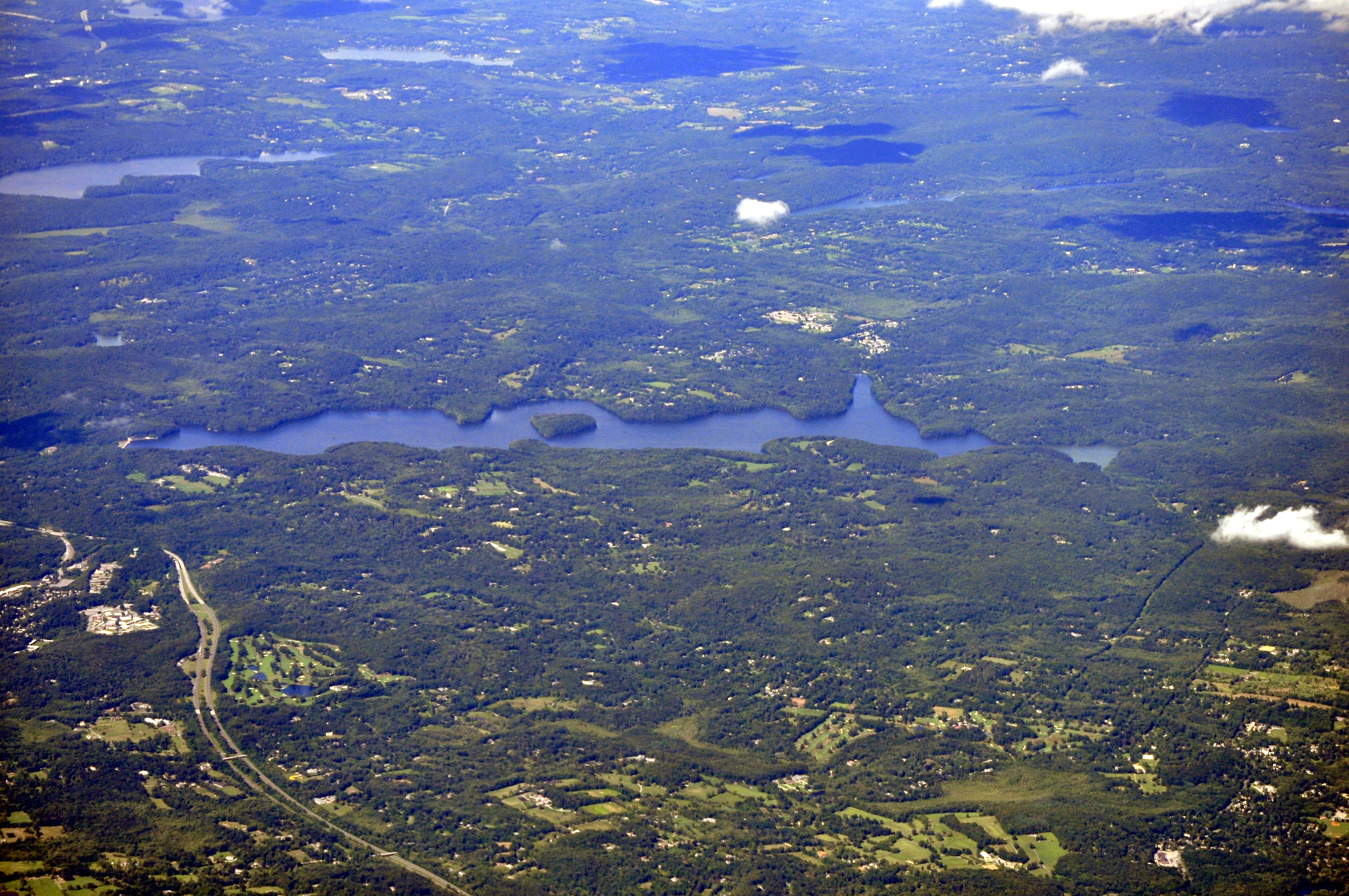
Cross River Reservoir from the air (August 2013)

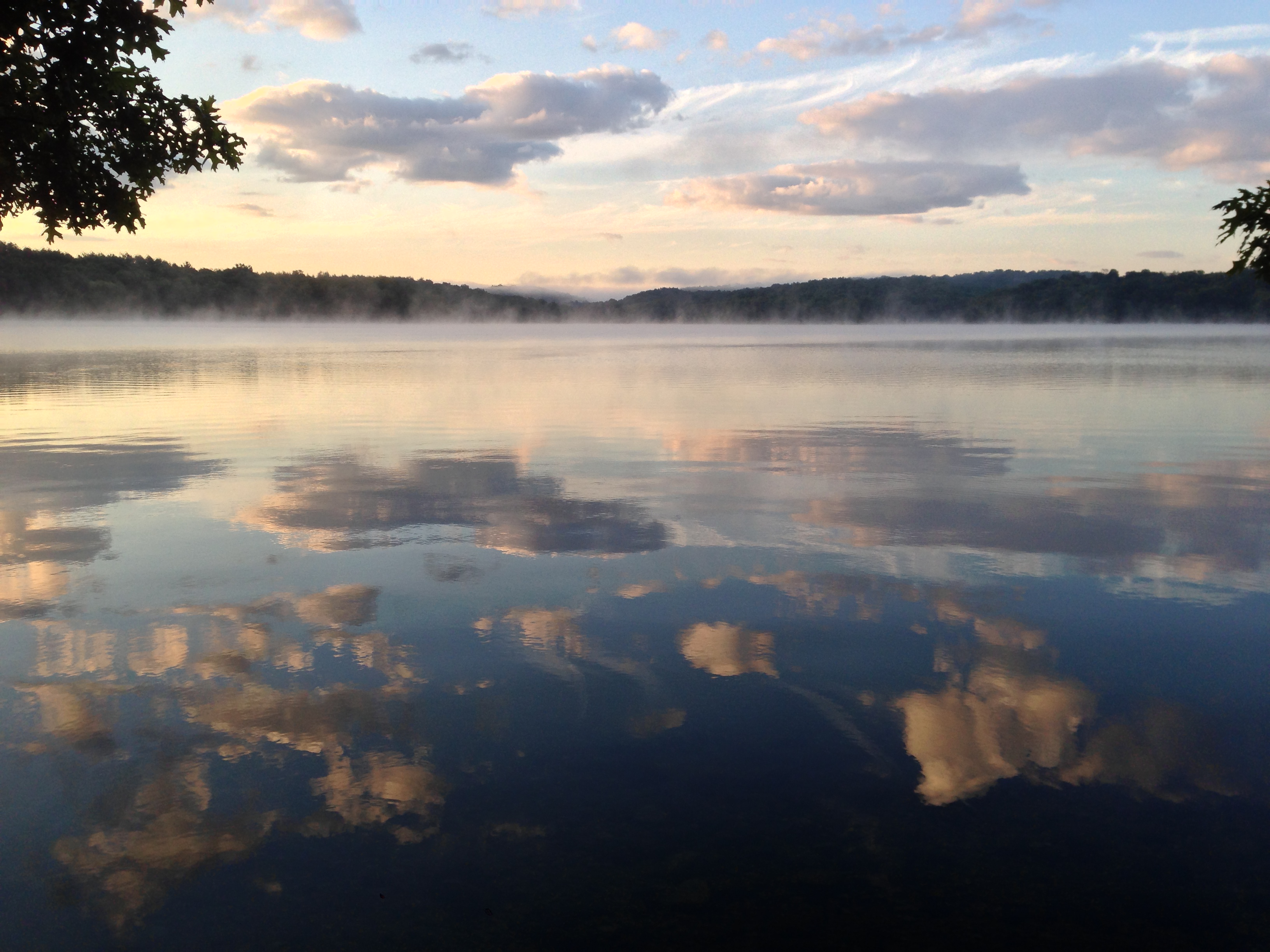
Early morning reflection in the reservoir (August 2013)

The Cross River Reservoir is a reservoir in the New York City water supply system located directly east and north of the northern Westchester County, New York, Hamlet of Katonah. Part of the system's Croton Watershed, it lies within the towns of Bedford, Lewisboro, and Pound Ridge, about 1 mile (1.6 km) east of the village of Katonah, and over 25 mi (40 km) north of New York City. It was constructed around the start of the 20th century by impounding the Cross River, a tributary of the Croton River, which eventually flows into the Hudson River.

The reservoir was finally put into service in 1908. The resulting body of water is one of 16 (12 reservoirs and 4 controlled lakes) in the Croton Watershed, the southernmost of New York City's watersheds. The reservoir is approximately 3.2 mi (5.1 km) long, has a drainage basin of 30 square miles (78 km^{2}), and can hold 10.3 billion US gallons (39,000,000 m^{3}) of water at full capacity, making it one of the city's smaller reservoirs.

Water from the reservoir enters a continuation of Cross River, which drains into the Muscoot Reservoir. The Muscoot flows into the New Croton Reservoir, where the Croton Watershed's flow enters the New Croton Aqueduct and is carried to the Jerome Park Reservoir in the Bronx for distribution in New York City.

== See also ==
- List of reservoirs and dams in New York
