= Old Croton Dam =

- Site of Old Croton Dam
- U.S. National Register of Historic Places
- U.S. National Historic Landmark District – Contributing property
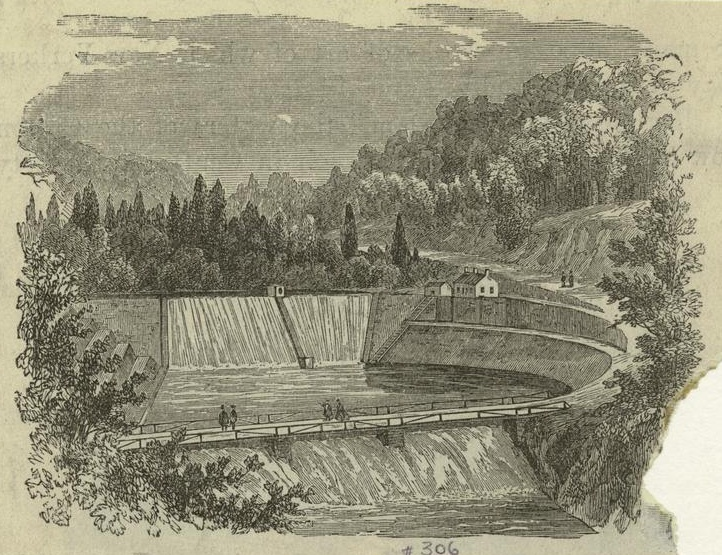
- 1872 engraving of the dam

- Location within New York Location within the United States
- Location: S of Yorktown Heights on NY 129, Yorktown, New York
- Coordinates: 41°14′00″N 73°48′02″W
- Area: 110 acres (45 ha)
- Built: 1842
- Architect: John B. Jervis; Multiple
- Part of: Croton Aqueduct (ID74001324)
- NRHP reference No.: 73001289
- Added to NRHP: June 19, 1973

The Old Croton Dam is a historic dam located in Yorktown, Westchester County, New York, now lying submerged beneath the waters of the New Croton Reservoir. The dam was built on the Croton River between 1837 and 1842, and was the first substantial masonry dam in the United States. Construction was delayed by a January 1841 storm that washed away most of the dam, with heavy downstream damage and loss of life.

== History ==
The gravity dam was constructed with a granite ashlar foundation and a rubble core. It was 57 feet (17 m) high and 670 feet (200 m) long. The dam impounded water from the Croton Watershed, forming a reservoir several miles long to the northeast along the path of the Croton River. Water flowed to New York City through the Old Croton Aqueduct, which started just upstream of the dam, carrying water down the Croton River valley toward the Hudson River, then roughly following the Hudson River south.

The dam and aqueduct constituted a major part of the original New York City water supply system. The New Croton Aqueduct opened in 1890, augmenting the original system until supply from the Delaware and Catskill aqueducts was sufficient to take it offline in 1955. When the New Croton Dam was completed in 1906, the old dam was submerged to a depth of 34 feet (10 m).

The dam site was added to the National Register of Historic Places in 1973.

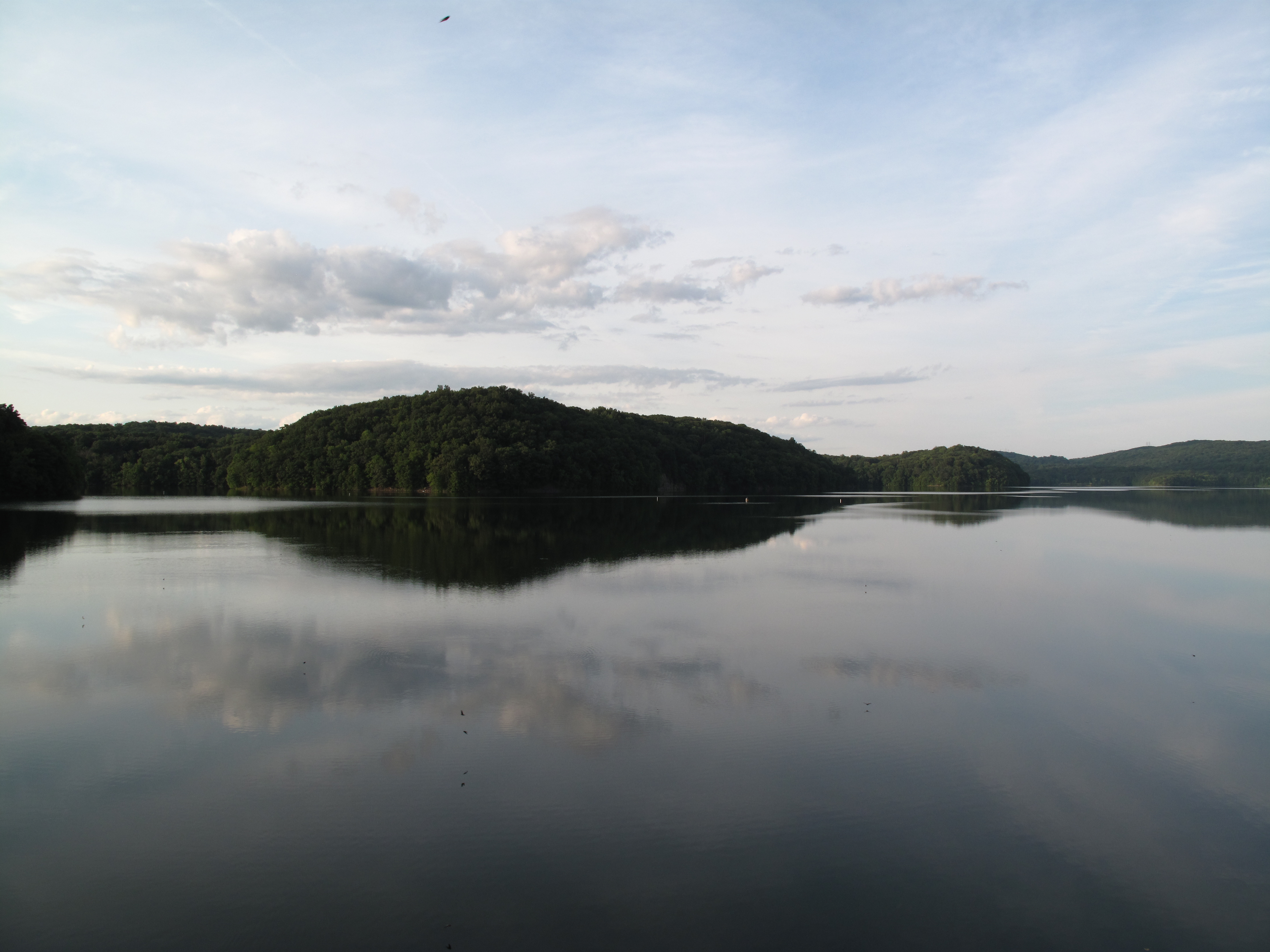
The Old Croton Dam lies submerged in the New Croton Reservoir

== See also ==
- National Register of Historic Places listings in northern Westchester County, New York
