= Cross River (New York) =

River in the U.S. state of New York

Coordinates: 41°16′06″N 73°42′05″W

The Cross River is a short river that rises within the hamlet of Cross River in the town of Lewisboro in southern New York state. Its headwaters make a loop, heading south, then southwest, then northwest, and finally west, continuing a few miles in that direction until it joins a tendril of the Cross River Reservoir, a part of the New York City water supply system.

A part of both the Croton River watershed and the system's Croton Watershed, it flows out of the reservoir's spillway before joining the Croton River in Katonah.

The short stretch of river that begins at the spillway outlet and continues on to the river's entry into the Muscoot Reservoir is an early spring trout fishery.

== See also ==
- List of New York rivers
