= New York State Route 129 =

State highway in Westchester County, New York, US

New York State Route 129
- Map of Westchester County in southeastern New York with NY 129 highlighted in red

Route information
- Maintained by NYSDOT
- Length: 7.75 mi (12.47 km)
- Existed: 1930–present

Major junctions
- West end: US 9 / NY 9A in Croton-on-Hudson
- East end: NY 118 in Yorktown

Location
- Country: United States
- State: New York
- Counties: Westchester

Highway system
- New York Highways; Interstate; US; State; Reference; Parkways
← NY 128	→ NY 130

New York State Route 129 (NY 129) is a 7.75-mile (12.47 km) long state highway in the western part of Westchester County, New York. The route begins at New York State Route 9A (South Riverside Avenue) in the village of Croton-on-Hudson near the Hudson River. NY 129 then travels through the towns of Cortlandt and Yorktown, running along the northern edge of the New Croton Reservoir. It passes under (southbound) and over (northbound) the Taconic State Parkway in Yorktown with no direct interchange. NY 129 ends in Yorktown at an intersection with NY 118.

NY 129 was designated in 1908 as a section of Route 2, a legislative route designated by the New York State Legislature. However, in 1921, the route was realigned off the route that would become NY 129 in favor of NY 9A. Nine years later, the state designated the route as NY 129 during the state highway renumbering. The route originally followed a route used by NY 131 once the routes were swapped in the 1940s, with NY 131 being decommissioned soon after. NY 129 was extended to end at a traffic circle with NY 100 in the hamlet of Pines Bridge. This lasted up to at least 1969, when the designation was truncated back to NY 118, which was extended to the traffic circle instead. The traffic circle in Pines Bridge was removed by 1991. Originally, NY 129 had an interchange with the Taconic, but the ramps were removed in 1969 and a new interchange was built on nearby Underhill Avenue.

== Route description ==
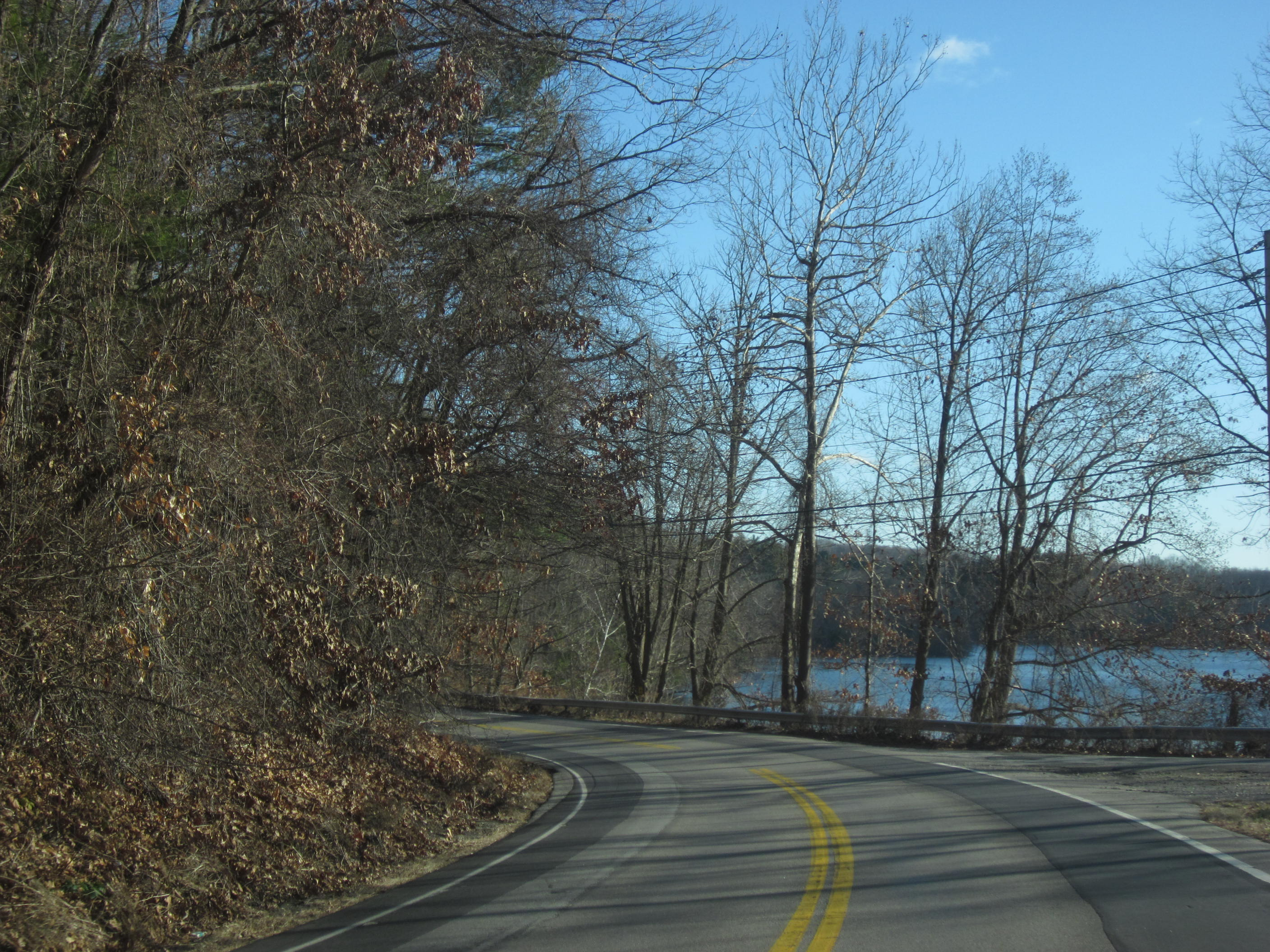
NY 129 proceeding east alongside the New Croton Reservoir

NY 129 begins at an intersection with NY 9A (South Riverside Avenue) in the village of Croton-on-Hudson, next to U.S. Route 9 (US 9). NY 129 proceeds northward from NY 9A along Maple Street, a two-lane commercial street through the village. At Van Cortlandt Park, NY 129 becomes residential, passing Croton-Harmon High School as it bends to the northeast. At the junction with Grand Street, NY 129 continues northeast on Grand Street, which is a two-lane residential street. The route continues northeast through the village, crossing an intersection with Quaker Bridge Road before becoming a wooded lane in the town of Cortlandt. In Cortlandt, NY 129 continues north as Grand Street, paralleling a local creek and entering Croton Dam Plaza.

Running along the western edge of the plaza, NY 129 bends north at a view of the New Croton Dam, continuing its way north alongside the New Croton Reservoir. NY 129 soon changes names to Croton Dam Road, passing east of the Croton Harman School District headquarters. At an intersection with East Mount Airy Road, NY 129 runs eastward along the reservoir, changing names to Yorktown Road. On a short stint away from the reservoir, NY 129 intersects with Croton Road before crossing over the Hunters Brook Bridge, where it crosses into the historic community of Huntersville. Continuing northeast from Huntersville, NY 129, now known as Croton Lake Road, bends through the town of Yorktown.

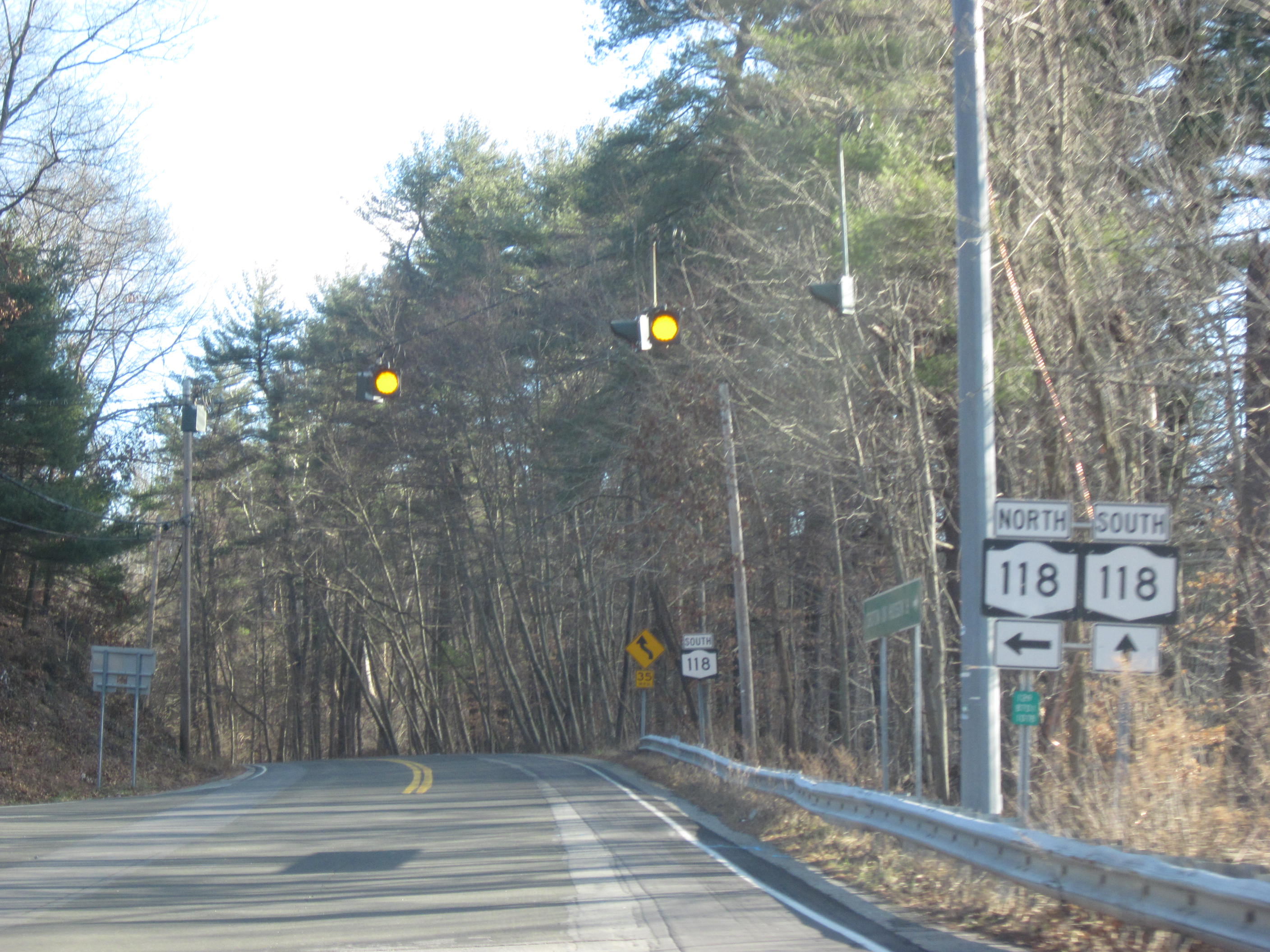
NY 129 at its junction with NY 118 in Yorktown, just west of Pines Bridge

Through Yorktown, NY 129 is a two-lane residential street alongside the reservoir, soon making a gradual bend to the southeast into an intersection with Underhill Avenue, a former alignment of NY 131. At the junction with Underhill Avenue, NY 129 turns southward, soon winding its way southeast under the lanes of the Taconic State Parkway, and back alongside the New Croton Reservoir. After crossing under the Taconic, the route then drops back down to the reservoir and passing a house reported to have been moved from Huntersville before it was flooded. Making several winds to the southeast, NY 129 connects to the Gate House Bridge, soon running eastward through Yorktown. NY 129 intersects with NY 118 (Saw Mill River Road). This intersection serves as the eastern terminus of NY 129, as NY 118 continues east along the reservoir.

== History ==
What is now NY 129 was developed in the early 20th century as part of a general project to improve access and transportation across the reservoirs. In 1908, the New York State Legislature created Route 2, an unsigned legislative route (an unsigned internal route) extending from the New York City line at Yonkers to the Columbia County village of Valatie. Route 2 initially followed modern NY 129, Croton Avenue, and NY 35 between Croton-on-Hudson and Peekskill; however, it was realigned on March 1, 1921, to use what is now NY 9A instead. NY 129 was designated to most of its current alignment as part of the 1930 renumbering of state highways in New York. It originally followed Croton Dam Road, the southern perimeter road around the New Croton Reservoir, while Croton Lake Road, the northern route, was designated as NY 131 by the following year. The alignments of NY 129 and NY 131 in the vicinity of the reservoir were swapped c. 1941 and the NY 131 designation ceased to exist by the mid-1940s. With the route changes, NY 129 was extended to terminate at NY 100 at a traffic circle in Pines Bridge while NY 118 terminated near Croton Lake. This extension lasted for over two decades until NY 118 was extended over the alignment of NY 129 to the traffic circle by 1969.

Ramps from NY 129 to the Taconic State Parkway were removed by the East Hudson Parkway Authority in November 1969, to be replaced with a bridge. This required a shutdown of NY 129 and required drivers going north to Underhill Avenue. In fall 1988, the original Hunter Brook Bridge (less than 19 feet (5.8 m) wide) was replaced, as it was never designed to take heavy traffic such as concrete-mixing trucks. Between 1988 and 1991, the traffic circle between NY 118 and NY 100 was removed in favor of a three-way intersection between the two highways.

== Major intersections ==
The entire route is in Westchester County.

Location	mi	km	Destinations	Notes
Croton-on-Hudson	0.00	0.00	US 9 / NY 9A	Western terminus
Yorktown	7.75	12.47	NY 118 – Yorktown Heights	Eastern terminus; former NY 100
1.000 mi = 1.609 km; 1.000 km = 0.621 mi
