= Groton =

Groton may refer to:

== Places ==
=== England ===
- Groton, Suffolk

=== United States ===
- Groton, Connecticut, a town
  - Groton (city), Connecticut, within the town
- Groton, Massachusetts, a town
  - Groton (CDP), Massachusetts, the main village in the town
- Groton, New Hampshire
  - Groton Wind Power Project
- Groton (town), New York
  - Groton (village), New York, within the town
- Groton, South Dakota
- Groton, Vermont, a town
  - Groton (CDP), Vermont, within the town

== Boarding schools in the United States ==
- Groton School
- Lawrence Academy at Groton

== Other ==
- Groton Bridge Company, a former American firm
- Groton High School (disambiguation)

== See also ==
- Croton (disambiguation)
