= New York State Route 118 =

Highway in New York

New York State Route 118
- Map of southeastern New York with NY 118 highlighted in red

Route information
- Maintained by NYSDOT
- Length: 10.71 mi (17.24 km)
- Existed: 1930–present

Major junctions
- South end: NY 100 in Yorktown
- NY 129 in Yorktown; US 202 / NY 35 in Yorktown Heights
- North end: US 6 in Baldwin Place

Location
- Country: United States
- State: New York
- Counties: Westchester, Putnam

Highway system
- New York Highways; Interstate; US; State; Reference; Parkways
| ← NY 117 | → NY 119 |

New York State Route 118 (NY 118) is a north–south state highway that extends for 10.71 miles (17.24 km) in Downstate New York in the United States. Much of the highway is located within Westchester County; however, a small portion of the route near the northern terminus is situated in Putnam County. The southern terminus of the route is at an intersection with NY 100 in the town of Yorktown. Its northern terminus is at a junction with U.S. Route 6 (US 6) in the hamlet of Baldwin Place. NY 118 passes through the hamlets of Yorktown Heights and Amawalk, where it overlaps with US 202 and NY 35. The route was assigned as part of the 1930 renumbering of state highways in New York; however, it was initially routed on the portion of modern NY 100 and US 202 between the New Croton Reservoir and Croton Falls. It was moved onto its current alignment to Croton Lake in the late 1930s, but the easternmost piece was designated as an extension of NY 129 to a traffic circle in the hamlet of Pines Bridge. This section became part of NY 118 by 1969.

== Route description ==
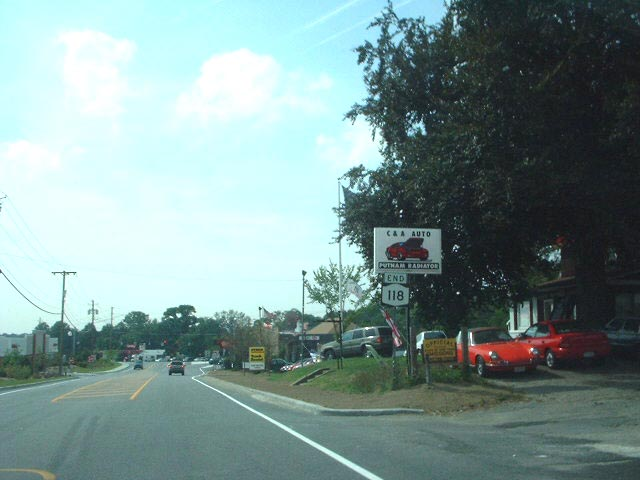
Approaching the northern terminus of NY 118 at US 6 in Mahopac

NY 118 begins at an intersection with NY 100 north of Croton Lake in the town of Yorktown. It heads westward as Saw Mill River Road, following the northern edge of the reservoir for 1 mile (1.6 km) to an intersection with NY 129. Here, the northern lake perimeter road becomes Croton Dam Road and continues west as NY 129 while Saw Mill River Road and NY 118 turn northward, passes through mostly residential areas as it heads toward the hamlet of Yorktown Heights. In the center of the hamlet, NY 118 enters a large commercial district based around NY 118's junction with NY 35 and US 202.

NY 118 joins US 202 and NY 35 here, forming a three-way overlap that extends northeasterly into the town of Somers. At the hamlet of Amawalk, NY 35 splits off to the east on Amawalk Road while US 202 and NY 118 continue northeastward along the western edge of the Amawalk Reservoir on Tomahawk Street. The overlap between US 202 and NY 118 ends at the northern edge of the reservoir, at which point US 202 leaves to the east on Lincolndale Road. NY 118, meanwhile, continues northward through residential neighborhoods into Putnam County. Just past the county line, NY 118 makes a 90-degree turn to the west onto Baldwin Place Road, then crossing the Putnam County Rail-Trail. The route ends 0.25 miles (0.40 km) later at an intersection with US 6 in the Carmel hamlet of Mahopac.

== History ==
The roadways that makeup NY 118 through Westchester and Putnam counties was taken over and constructed between 1903 and 1907. The first two segments, unsigned State Highway 148 (SH 148), which was NY 118 between a point north of NY 129 to Allan Avenue in Yorktown Heights along with a segment along the New Croton Reservoir and SH 149, which went from Allan Avenue all the way to US 6 in Baldwin Place, were both contracted for improvement on June 16, 1903. The contract on SH 148, 3.48 miles (5.60 km) long, was completed August 5, 1905 at the cost of $34,272.91 (equivalent to $1.16 million in 2024), half paid by the state. The contract on SH 149, 6.62 miles (10.65 km) long, cost $51,232.71 (1905 USD) and was completed on October 28, 1904. The other portion of NY 118, SH 405, made up part of NY 100, was contracted on September 20, 1907, at the cost of $17,605 (equivalent to $594,106 in 2024). This portion of NY 118 and NY 100 was completed and accepted into the state highway system on November 21, 1908.

NY 118 was assigned as part of the 1930 renumbering of state highways in New York; however, it did not initially follow any of its modern alignment. Instead, NY 118 headed northeastward from its current southern terminus on modern NY 100 and US 202 to a terminus at NY 22 in Croton Falls while all of what is now NY 118 was part of NY 100. At the time, NY 100 continued north along Baldwin Place Road and Myrtle Avenue to meet then-US 6 near Mahopac Falls. In June 1934, the portion of NY 118 between Somers and Croton Falls became concurrent to US 202, a new interstate route extending from Delaware to Maine. The alignments of NY 100 and NY 118 north of New Croton Reservoir were flipped c. 1939, placing NY 118 on its modern alignment. NY 118 initially continued north to NY 6N over NY 100's original alignment; however, this extension was eliminated in the mid-1940s. With the flip, NY 118 terminated at a junction with NY 129 in Croton Lake, while the latter extended to a traffic circle with NY 100 in the hamlet of Pines Bridge. This alignment remained until 1969, when the route was extended over the easternmost piece of NY 129 to end at the traffic circle with NY 100. The traffic circle in Pines Bridge was removed between 1988 and 1991 and replaced with a three-way intersection between the two routes.

== Major intersections ==
| County | Location | mi | km | Destinations | Notes |
|---|---|---|---|---|---|
| Westchester | Town of Yorktown | 0.00 | 0.00 | NY 100 – Somers, Millwood | Southern terminus |
| Westchester | Town of Yorktown | 1.28 | 2.06 | NY 129 west – Croton-on-Hudson | Eastern terminus of NY 129 |
| Westchester | Town of Yorktown | 4.34 | 6.98 | US 202 west / NY 35 west – Peekskill | Southern end of US 202/NY 35 concurrency; hamlet of Yorktown Heights |
| Westchester | Town of Somers | 5.81 | 9.35 | NY 35 east – Katonah | Northern end of NY 35 concurrency; hamlet of Amawalk |
| Westchester | Town of Somers | 8.63 | 13.89 | US 202 east – Somers | Northern end of US 202 concurrency |
| Westchester–Putnam county line | Somers–Carmel town line | 10.71 | 17.24 | US 6 – Peekskill, Brewster | Northern terminus; hamlet of Baldwin Place |
1.000 mi = 1.609 km; 1.000 km = 0.621 mi: Concurrency terminus
