= Kroton =

Kroton, now Crotone, Italy, was an Achaean colony from c. 710 BC on the coast of the Gulf of Crotone, Calabria, Italia.

Kroton may also refer to:

- The Krotons, a serial in the science fiction television series Doctor Who
- Kroton (Cyberman), character in the comic strips based on Doctor Who
- Kroton Educacional, a Brazilian private educational company

== See also ==
- Croton (disambiguation)
