= Croton River =

River in New York, United States

Coordinates: 41°11′12″N 73°52′36″W

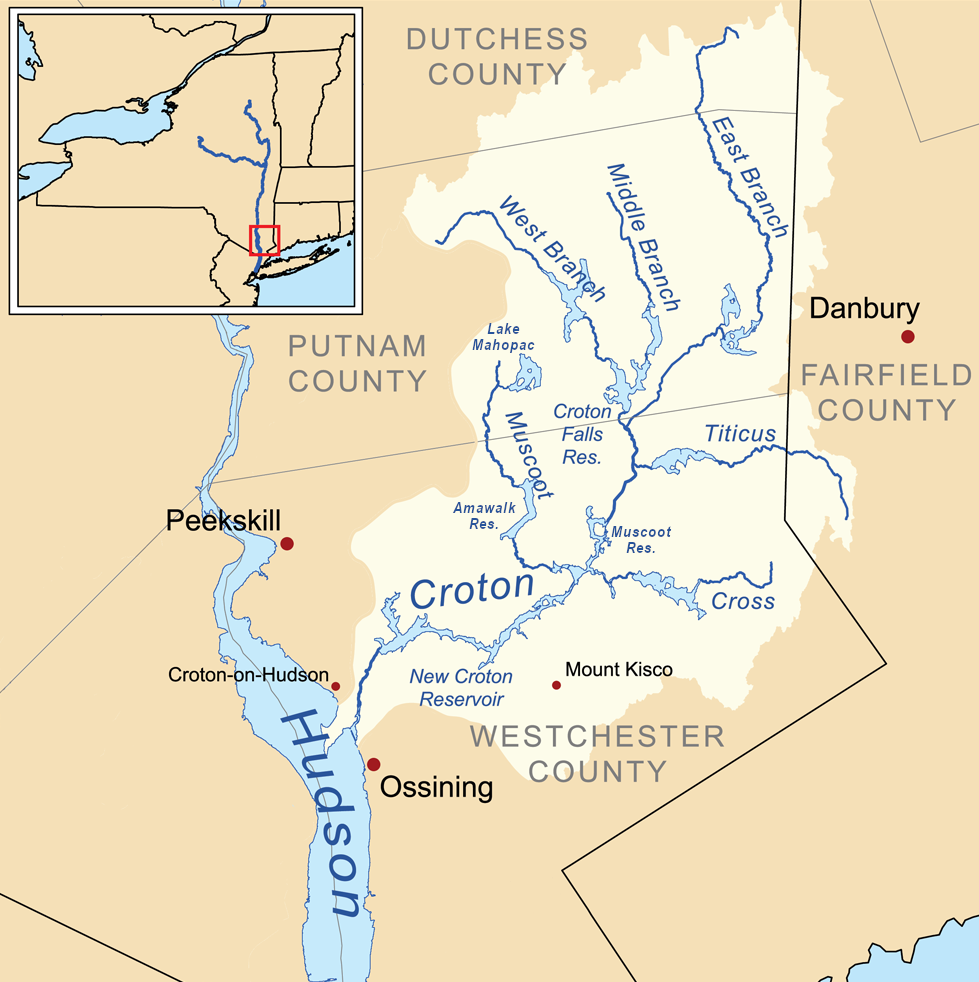
Map of the Croton River watershed

The Croton River (/ˈkroʊtən/ KROH-tən) is a river in southern New York with a watershed area of 361 square miles (930 km^{2}), and three principal tributaries: the West Branch, Middle Branch, and East Branch. Their waters, all part of the New York City water supply system, join downstream from the Croton Falls Reservoir. (Note: As a result of dam construction, the waters of the Middle and West Branches mingle in Croton Falls Reservoir before exiting as a brief stretch of the West Branch alone, which joins the East Branch at the confluence of the Croton River proper.) Together, their waters and the reservoirs linked to them represent the northern half of the New York City water system's Croton Watershed.

Shortly after the confluence of the three Croton River branches the Croton River proper flows westward into the Muscoot Reservoir, joined separately from the north by the Muscoot River, a tributary. The Muscoot empties into the New Croton Reservoir, which feeds the New Croton Aqueduct, supplying water to the Jerome Park Reservoir in the Bronx for distribution in New York City. Excess water leaves the spillway at the New Croton Dam and empties into the Hudson River at Croton-on-Hudson, New York at Croton Point, about 30 miles (50 km) north of New York City.

== History ==
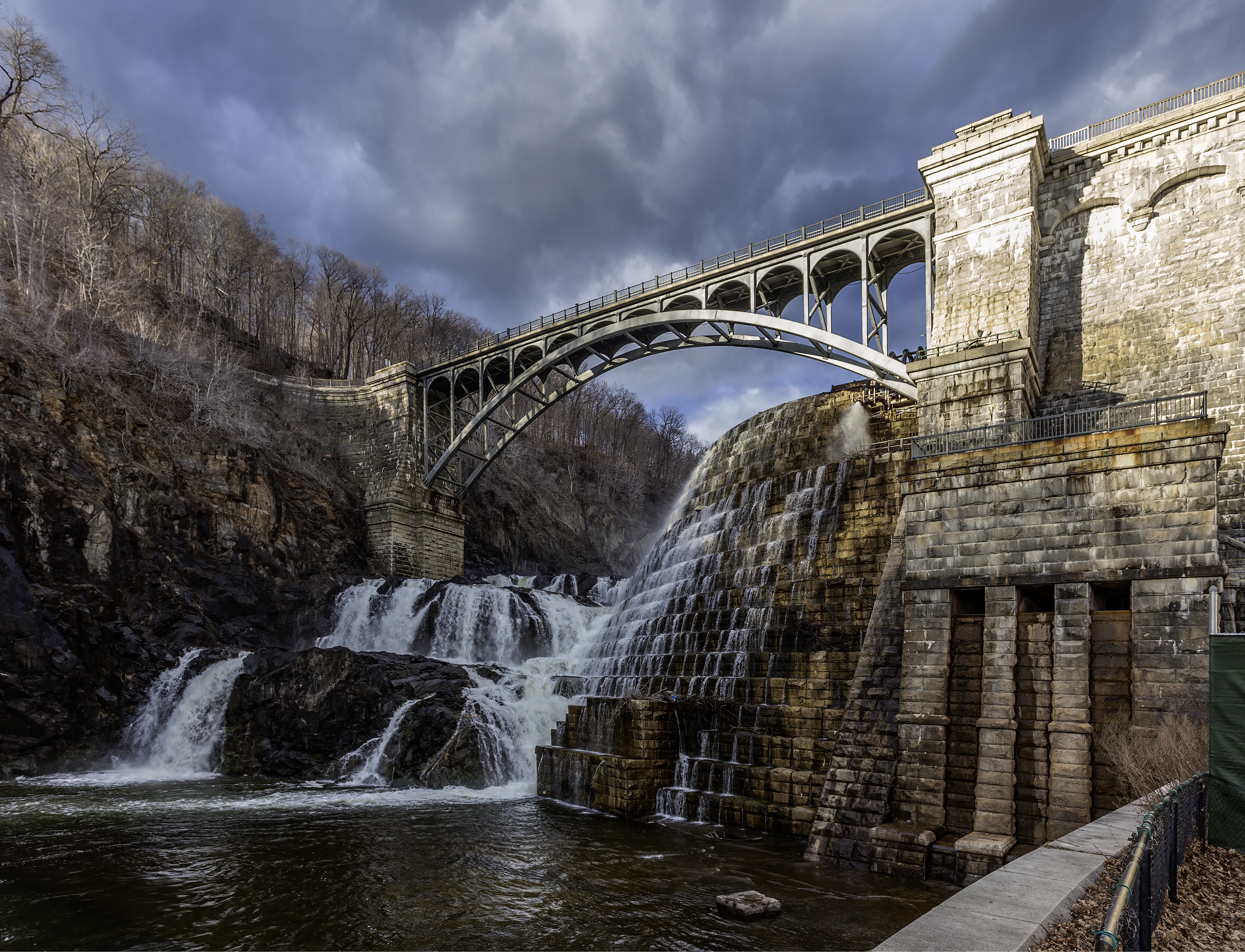
The Croton River is part of the New York City water supply system, the flow of its three branches are collected at the New Croton Reservoir. Pictured, New Croton Dam

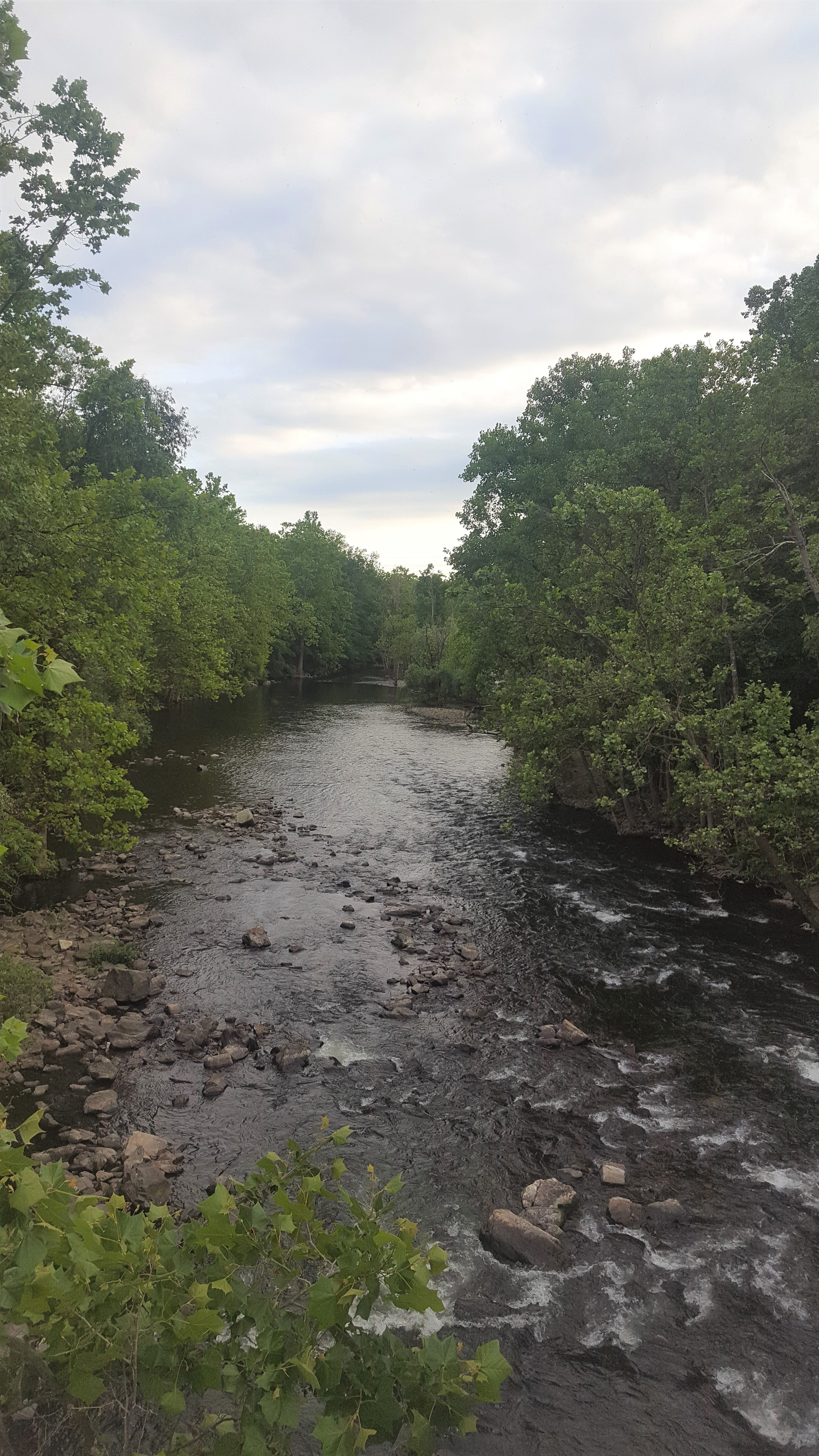
Croton River as it flows away from Croton Dam

The Croton River was the main source of the city water supply from 1842 to the mid-20th century. Water was brought to the city through the Croton Aqueduct, later called the Old Croton Aqueduct. The larger New Croton Aqueduct opened in 1890. The Old Croton Aqueduct remained in parallel service until waters from the Catskill and Delaware Aqueducts could supersede it in 1955.

Seeking to expand the city's water supply, engineers of the city Aqueduct Commission designed in 1884 a 275-to-300-foot-high (84 to 91 m) masonry dam spanning the Croton River near its mouth. The resulting storage reservoir, impounding a 16-square-mile (41 km^{2}) watershed, would hold 14.2 billion US gallons (54,000,000 m^{3}) at full capacity. This dam, now known as the New Croton Dam, was completed in 1906. Further upstream, two tributaries of the Croton were dammed, creating the Croton Falls Reservoir, which was placed into service in 1911.

In the 1890s, rather than building an expensive filtration system, the city ordered the destruction or relocation of any village or hamlet in the watershed that was considered to be a potential pollution source for the Croton or its tributaries. Many were moved.

In the late 1990s, the city stopped using water from the Croton system as it became more and more unsuitable for drinking. In 2004, a project was started to rehabilitate the New Croton Aqueduct and build the Croton Water Filtration Plant, which came online in May 2015. By the early 21st century the Croton system was supplying 10% of the city's water.

== See also ==
- Water supply network
- List of rivers of New York
- Croton Gorge Park
