= Groton High School =

Groton High School may refer to:

- Groton High School (Groton, Massachusetts), listed on the NRHP in Middlesex County, Massachusetts
- Groton High School (Groton, New York)

- Former Groton High School (Groton, New York), listed on the NRHP in Tompkins County, New York

- Groton High School (Groton, South Dakota)
