= Croton Gorge Park =

Park in Cortlandt, New York, US

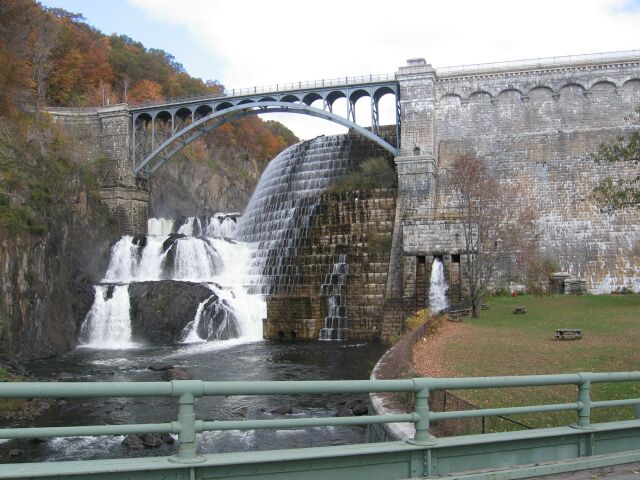
- View of the New Croton Dam in Croton Gorge Park

- Location within New York
- Type: County park
- Location: Cortlandt, New York
- Coordinates: 41°13′34″N 73°51′21″W
- Area: 97 acres (39 ha)
- Created: 1964
- Operator: Westchester County, New York
- Open: All year and free of charge

Croton Gorge Park is a park in Cortlandt, New York owned and operated by Westchester County. It consists of 97 acres (39 ha) at the base of New Croton Dam, which is one of the largest hand-hewn structures in the world (after the Great Pyramids and the Great Wall of China). The park is a popular venue for fishing, picnicking, sledding and cross country skiing. The Old Croton Trail begins in the park, which also includes a baseball field and an impressive fountain occasionally operated with high pressure water from the reservoir. The fountain was reopened in 2000 after having been out of service since the mid twentieth century.

The road over the top of the dam is one of four arteries for crossing the Croton River (only three of the bridges connect to public roads at both ends). Following the September 11 attacks in 2001, this road has been closed to non-emergency vehicles as a security precaution, though it remains open to pedestrians and bicycles, and a popular local venue. Previously, school buses had used the road as the best route available.

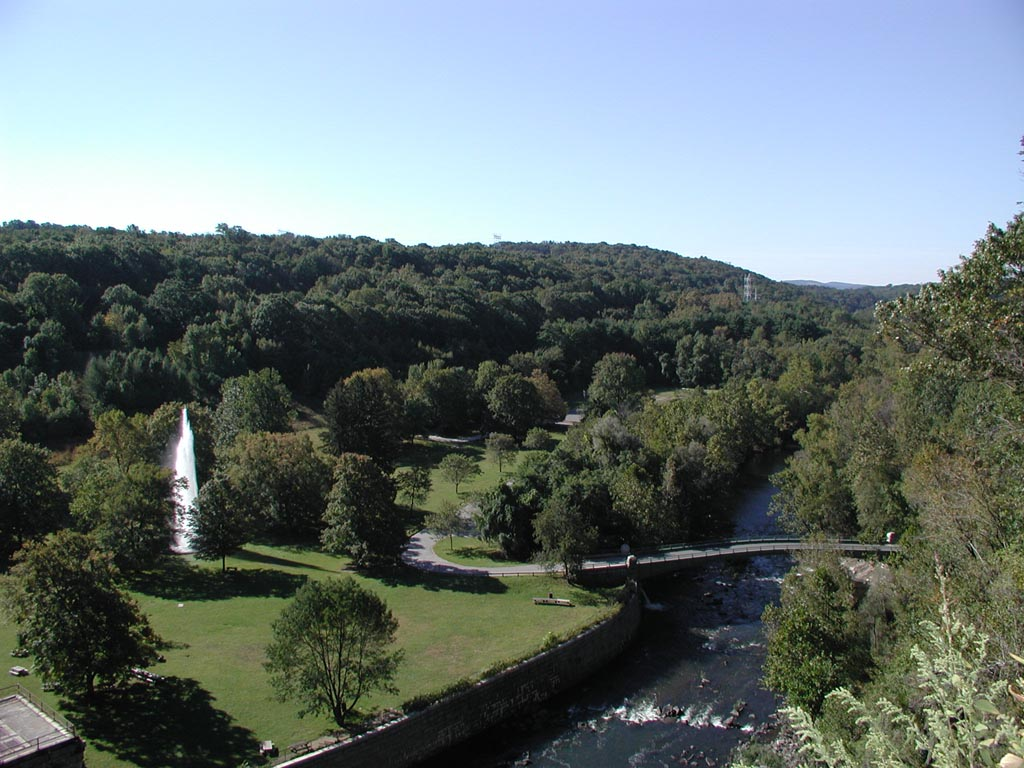
Park with fountain as seen from the dam

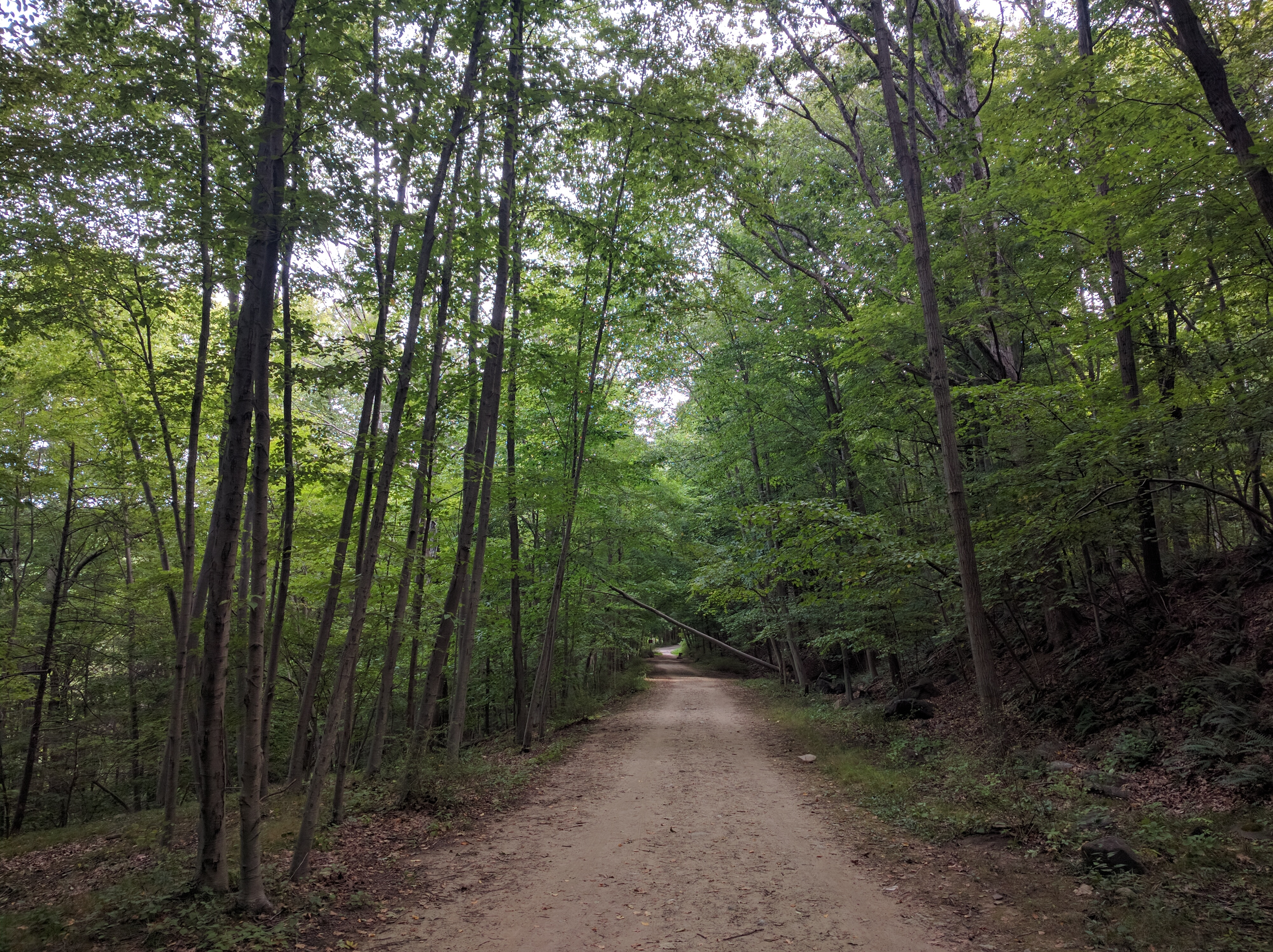
One of the trails leading to the top of the dam

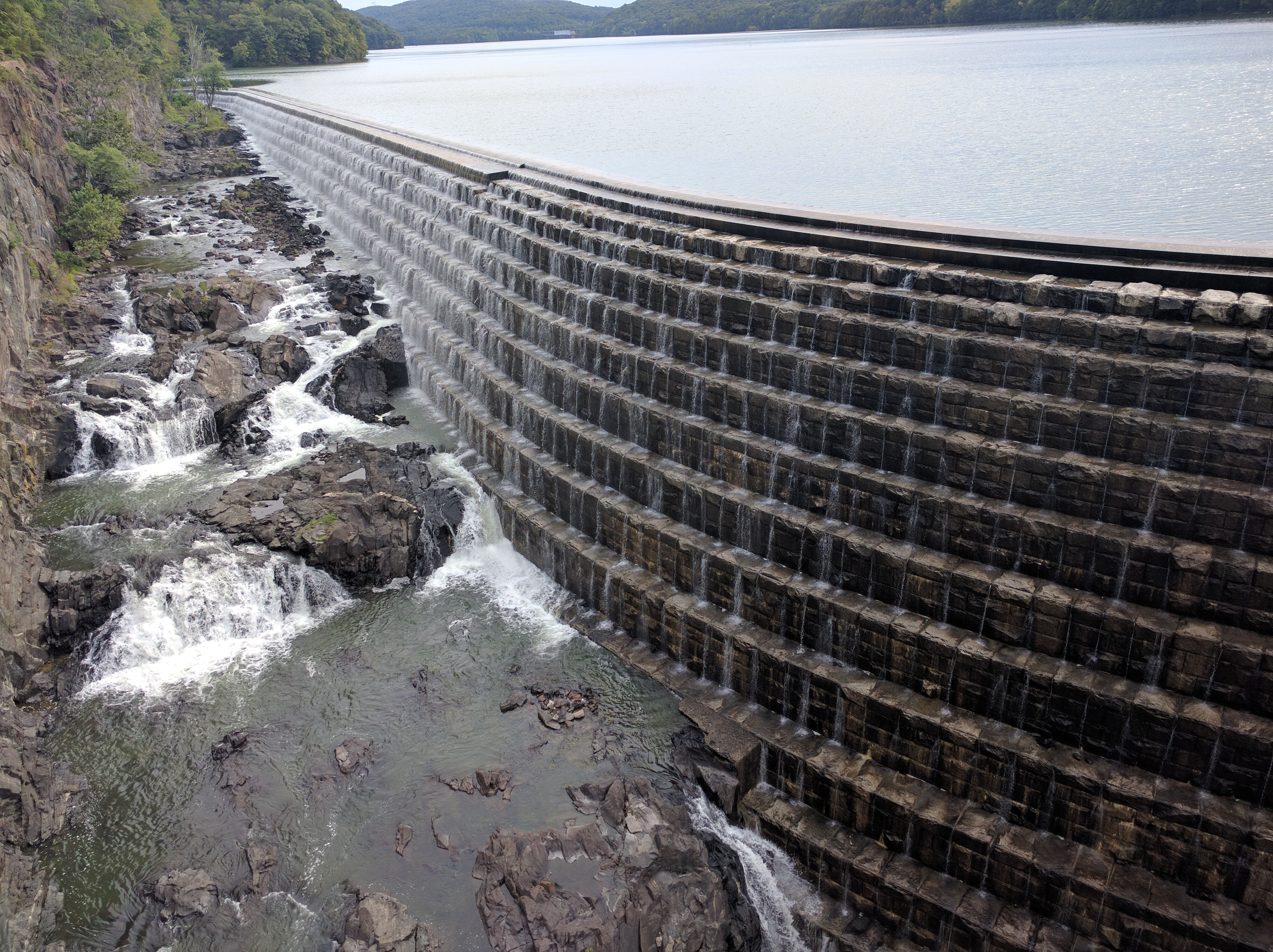
View from the dam

== See also ==
- Croton-on-Hudson
