= New Croton Dam =

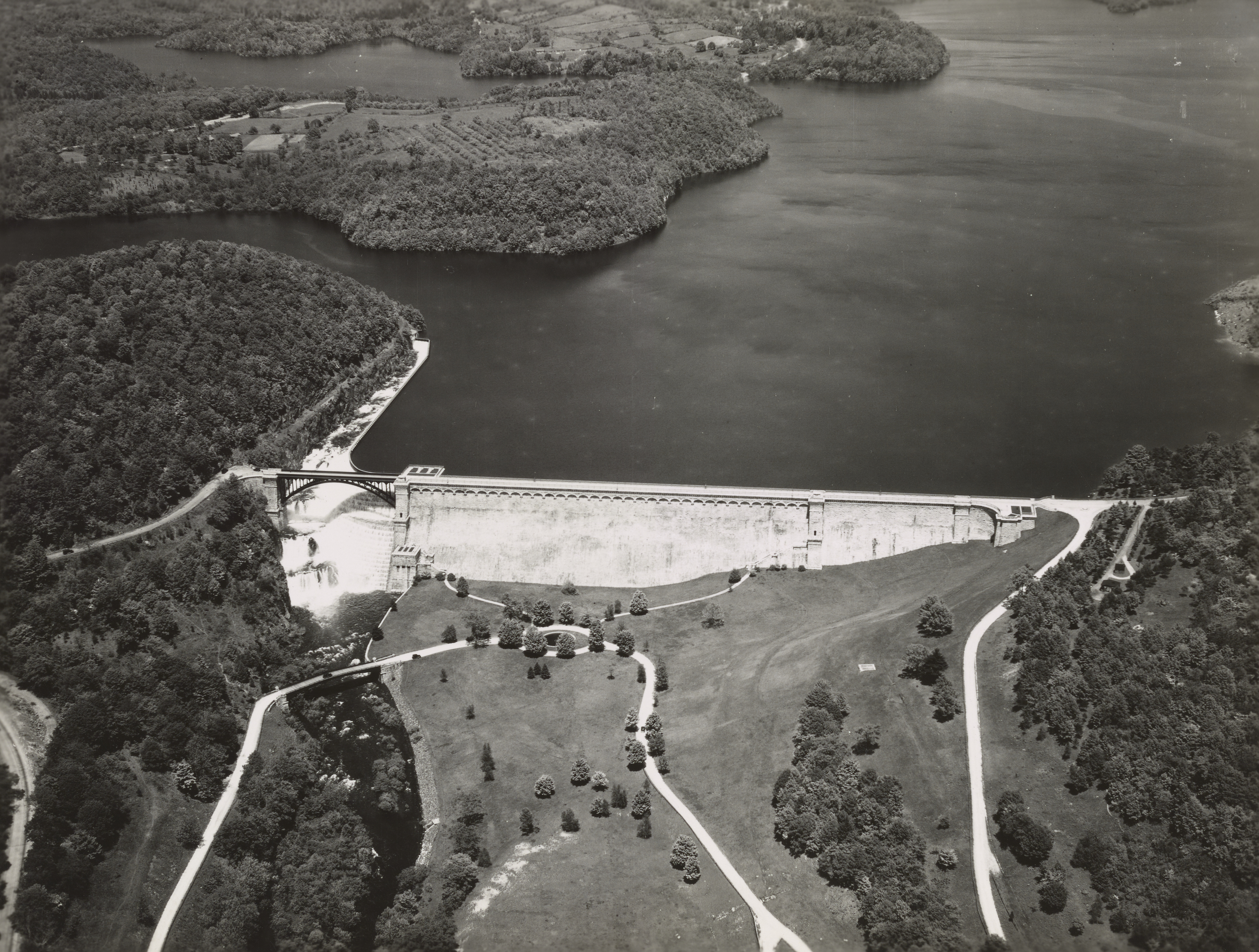
- New Croton Dam in May 1931
- Interactive map of New Croton Dam
- Location: Cortlandt, Westchester County, New York, USA
- Coordinates: 41°13′35″N 73°51′19″W
- Construction began: 1892
- Opening date: 1906; 120 years ago
- Operator: New York City

Dam and spillways
- Height: 297 feet (91 m)
- Length: 2,188 feet (667 m)
- Width (base): 266 feet (81 m)

Reservoir
- Creates: New Croton Reservoir

The New Croton Dam is a masonry gravity dam forming the New Croton Reservoir, both parts of the New York City water supply system. It stretches across the Croton River near Croton-on-Hudson, New York, about 22 miles (35 km) north of New York City.

Construction began in 1892 and was completed in 1906. Designed by Alphonse Fteley (1837–1903), the masonry dam is 266 feet (81 m) broad at its base and 297 feet (91 m) high from base to crest. At the time of its completion, it was the tallest dam in the world. It impounds up to 19 billion US gallons (72,000,000 m^{3}) of water, a small fraction of the New York City water system's total storage capacity of 580 billion US gallons (2.2×10^{9} m^{3}).

== History ==
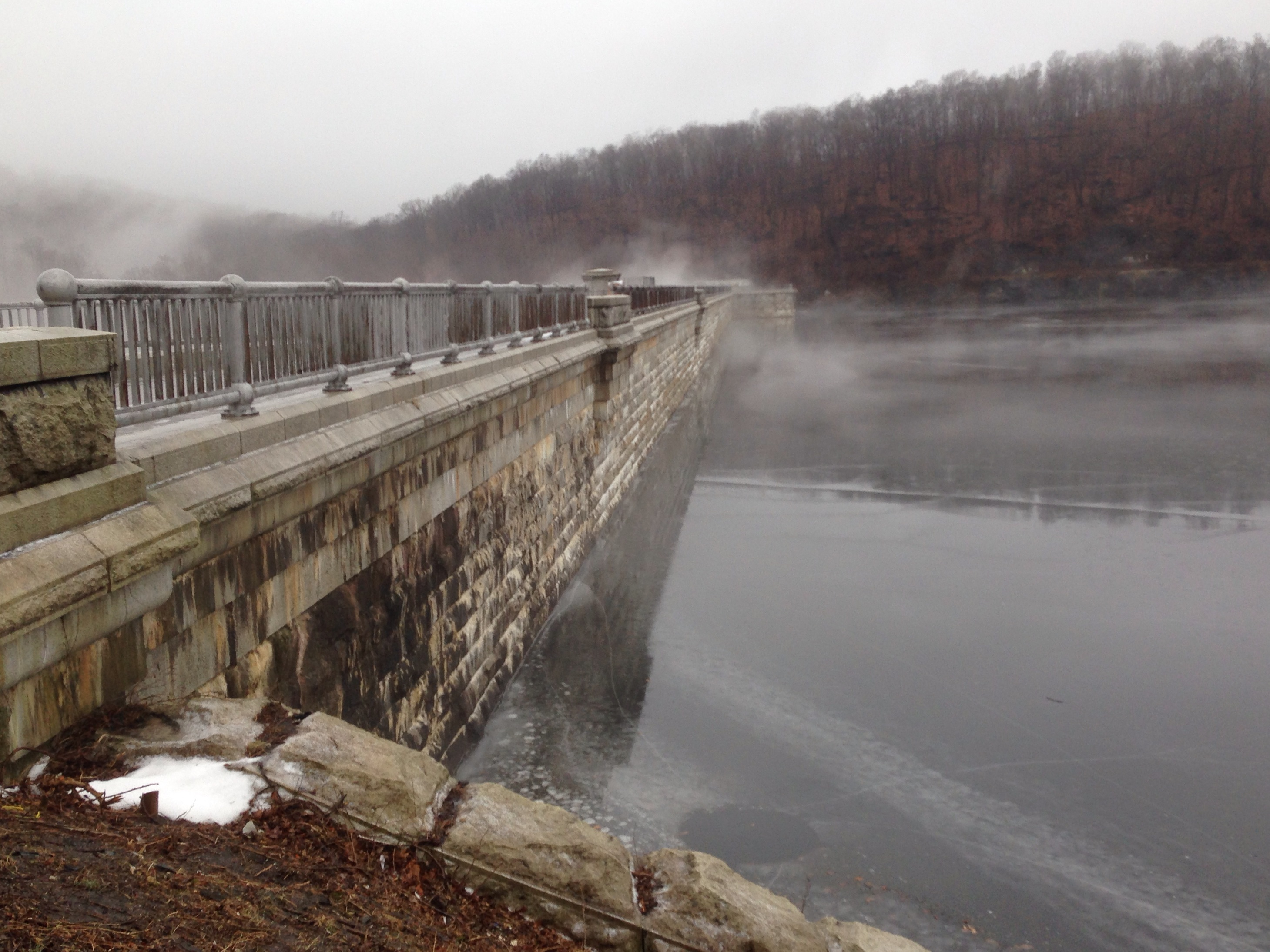
The dam on the reservoir side

=== Background ===
The original Croton Dam (Old Croton Dam) was built between 1837 and 1842 to improve New York City's water supply. By 1881, after extensive repairs to the dam, which was 50 feet (15 m) high, the Old Croton Reservoir was able to supply about 90 million US gallons (340,000 m^{3}) a day to the city via the Old Croton Aqueduct. To meet escalating water needs, the Aqueduct Commission of the City of New York ordered construction of a new Croton system in 1885. Hydro engineer James B. Francis was brought in as a consultant for the construction.

The proposed dam would be downstream from the old dam but taller, so the old dam would remain in place, totally submerged by the new reservoir, which was to cover 20 square miles (52 km^{2}) of land occupied by public and private buildings, six cemeteries, and more than 400 farms. Condemnation disputes led to "protests, lawsuits, and confusion" before payment of claims and the awarding of construction contracts. The work force on the new dam included stonemasons and laborers who had worked on the original dam. John B. Goldsborough, superintendent of excavations and hiring for the project, also recruited stonemasons from southern Italy, who re-located to New York.

=== Construction ===
Dam under construction in 1901

Construction on the New Croton Dam, also known as Cornell Dam, began in 1892 and was completed in 1906.

Building the dam meant diverting the river from its normal path and pumping the riverbed dry. To accomplish this, workers dug a crescent-shaped canal 1,000 feet (300 m) long and 200 feet (61 m) wide in the hill on the north side of the river, secured the canal with a masonry retaining wall, and built temporary dams to control the water flow. The initial construction lasted eight years, and extensive modifications and repairs went on for another six. Working conditions were often difficult. A silent film, The Croton Dam Strike, released in 1900, depicted labor–management problems related to the dam's construction.

Designed by Alphonse Fteley (1837–1903), the masony gravity dam is 266 feet (81 m) broad at its base and 297 feet (91 m) high from base to crest. At the time of its completion, it was the tallest dam in the world. Its foundation extends 130 feet (40 m) below the bed of the river, and the dam contains 850,000 cubic yards (650,000 m^{3}) of masonry. The engineers' tablet mounted on the headhouse nearest the spillway lists the spillway length as 1,000 feet (300 m) and the total length of the dam and spillway combined as 2,188 feet (667 m). New Croton Dam impounds up to 19 billion US gallons (72,000,000 m^{3}) of water, a small fraction of the New York City water system's total storage capacity of 580 billion US gallons (2.2×10^{9} m^{3}).

Work began in 1892 at a site on the property of A.B. Cornell 4 miles (6.4 km) downstream of the original dam, which was submerged by the new reservoir. New Croton Reservoir was eventually able to supply 200 to 300 million US gallons (760,000 to 1,140,000 m^{3}) a day via a new aqueduct that carried water to Jerome Park Reservoir in the north Bronx, New York City.

=== Repair ===
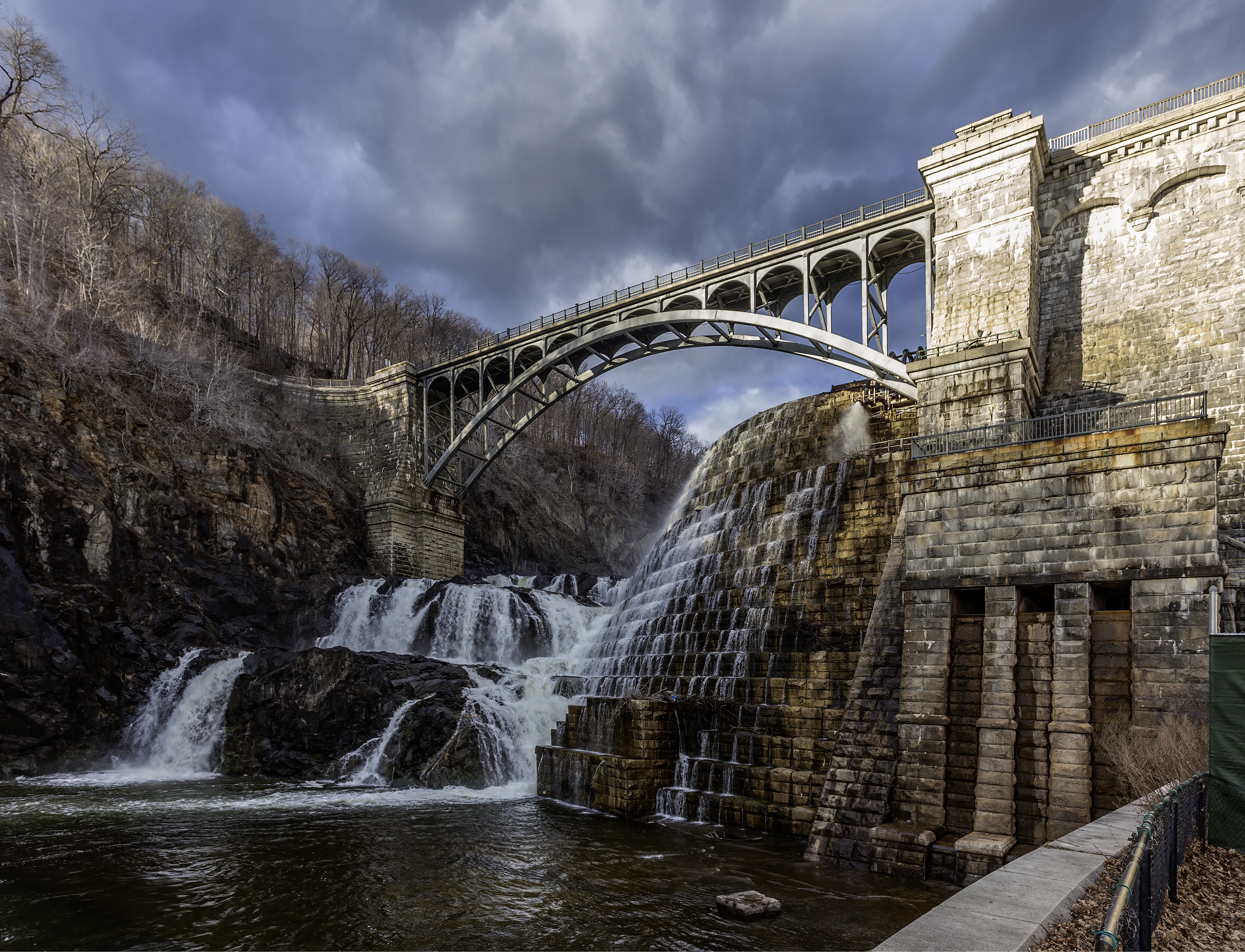
New Croton Dam in 2016

The bridge over the spillway was replaced in 1975 and again in 2005. In that same year, because of the September 11 attacks on New York City, the New York City Department of Environmental Protection proposed permanent closure of the road across the top of the dam. Pedestrians and emergency vehicles were allowed to use New Croton Dam Road, but all other traffic was re-routed. The department made plans to replace temporary vehicle barriers with permanent barriers after completion of a New Croton Dam Rehabilitation Project in 2011.

=== Discharge Data ===
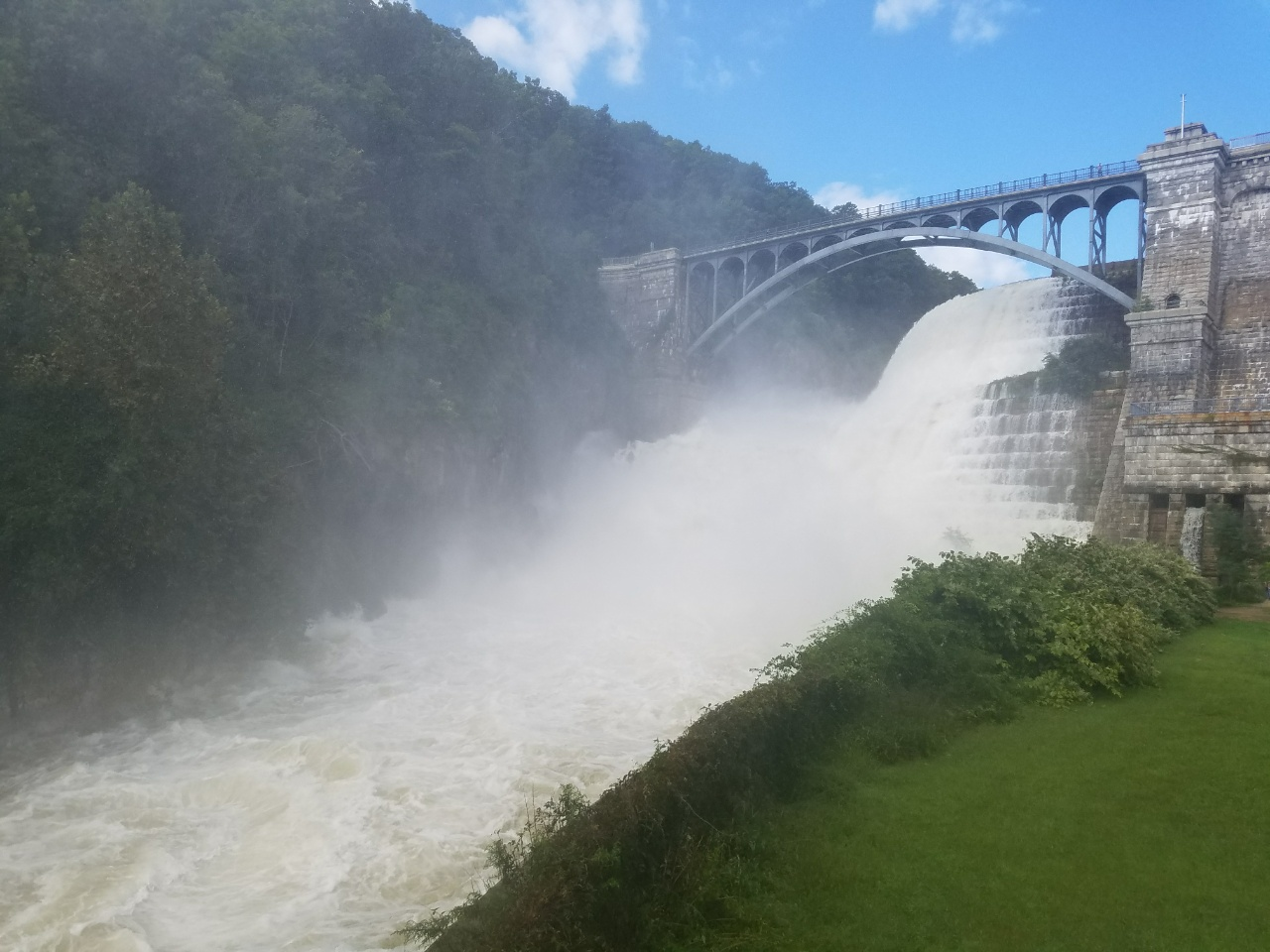
Water over the New Croton Dam spillway after Hurricane Ida in 2021 (average daily discharge 10,100 cubic feet per second)

U.S. Geological survey provides average daily discharge data for the Croton Dam here. Record discharge at the Croton Dam since records began in 1933 was on 1955-10-16 with 33,000 cfs (cubic feet per second); this was after dual hurricanes Connie and Diane.

== Trails ==
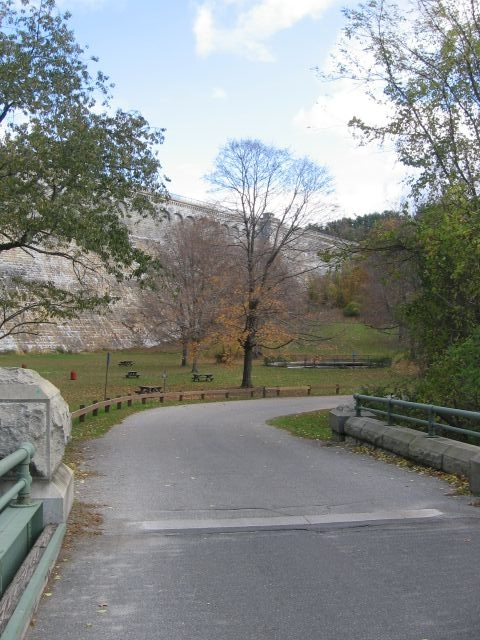
Old Croton Trail Endpoint

Croton Gorge Park offers views of the dam from directly downstream. The Old Croton Trail, a popular hiking and biking path that roughly follows the route of the Old Croton Aqueduct, has an endpoint near the base of the dam. Teatown Lake Reservation, a nature preserve, lies nearby as does Croton Point Park in Croton-on-Hudson.

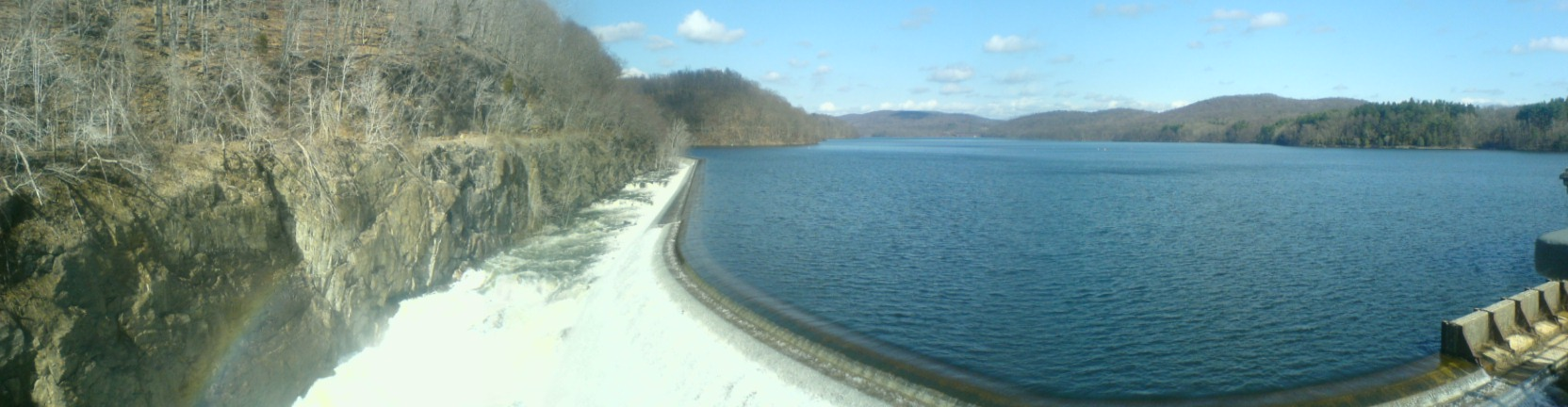
Panoramic view of New Croton Dam, looking northwest
