= New Croton Aqueduct =

Aqueduct in New York

Coordinates: 41°05′25″N 73°50′35″W

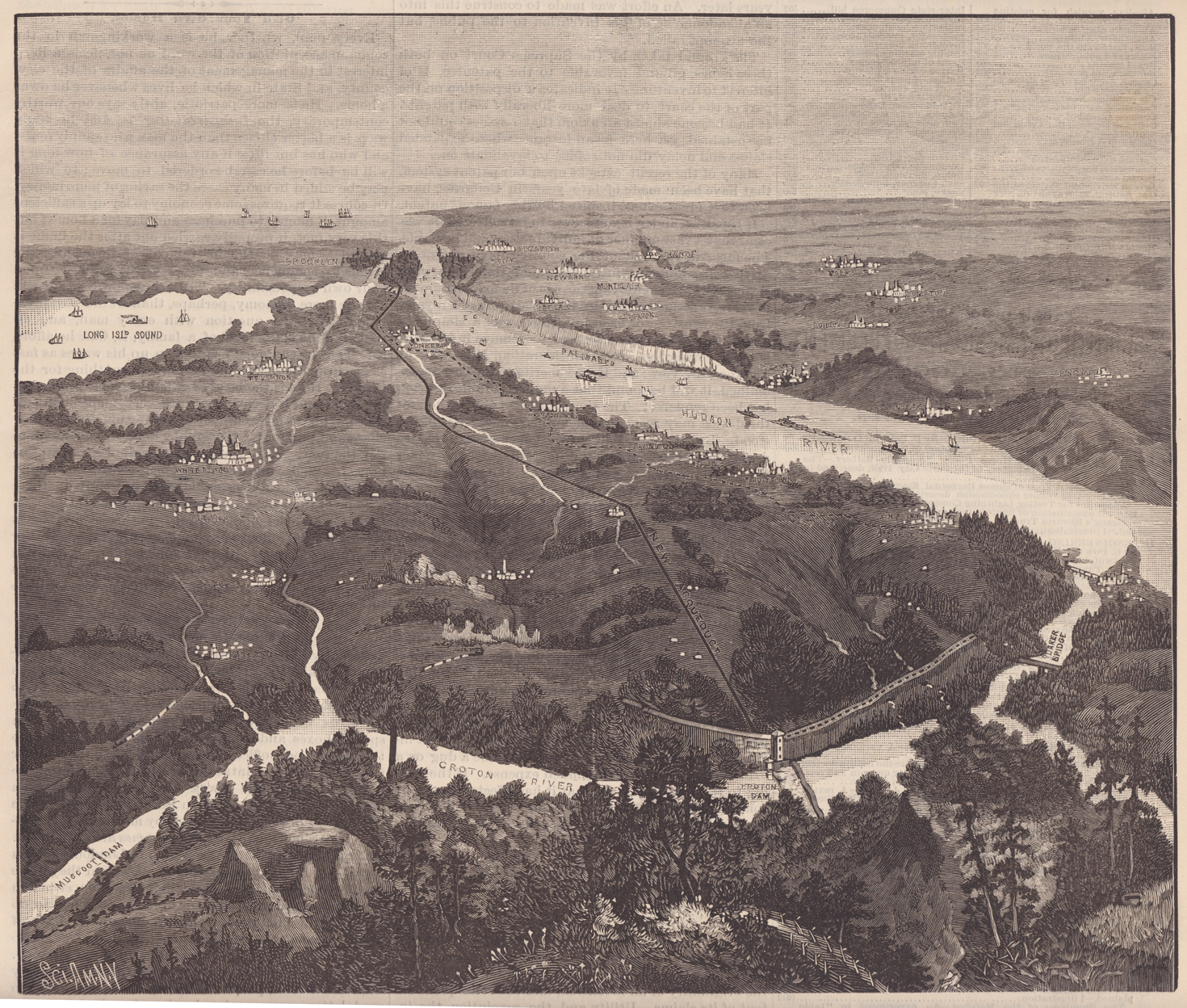
The engraving from Scientific American in 1887 that shows the New Croton Aqueduct in solid line comparing to the Old Croton Aqueduct in dotted line, looking south from Putnam County with Manhattan on the far side.

The New Croton Aqueduct is an aqueduct in the New York City water supply system, carrying the waters of the Croton Watershed from the New Croton Dam in Westchester County, New York, to the Jerome Park Reservoir in the Bronx. Built roughly parallel to the Old Croton Aqueduct which it originally augmented, the new aqueduct opened in 1890. The old aqueduct remained in service until 1955, when supply from the Delaware and Catskill Aqueducts was sufficient to allow taking it off line.

Croton Watershed waters continue from the Jerome Park Reservoir to the Croton Water Filtration Plant in Van Cortlandt Park for treatment, then out to distribution.

== Overview ==
The Croton Watershed is one of three systems that provide water to New York City, joined by the waters of the four reservoirs of the Delaware Aqueduct and two of the Catskill Aqueduct. The Croton system comprises 12 reservoirs and 3 controlled lakes, with waters of the Boyds Corner Reservoir and West Branch Reservoir being mixed with and carried off by the Delaware Aqueduct to the Kensico Reservoir instead of continuing on to the New Croton Dam and thence the Jerome Park Reservoir in the Bronx.

== History ==
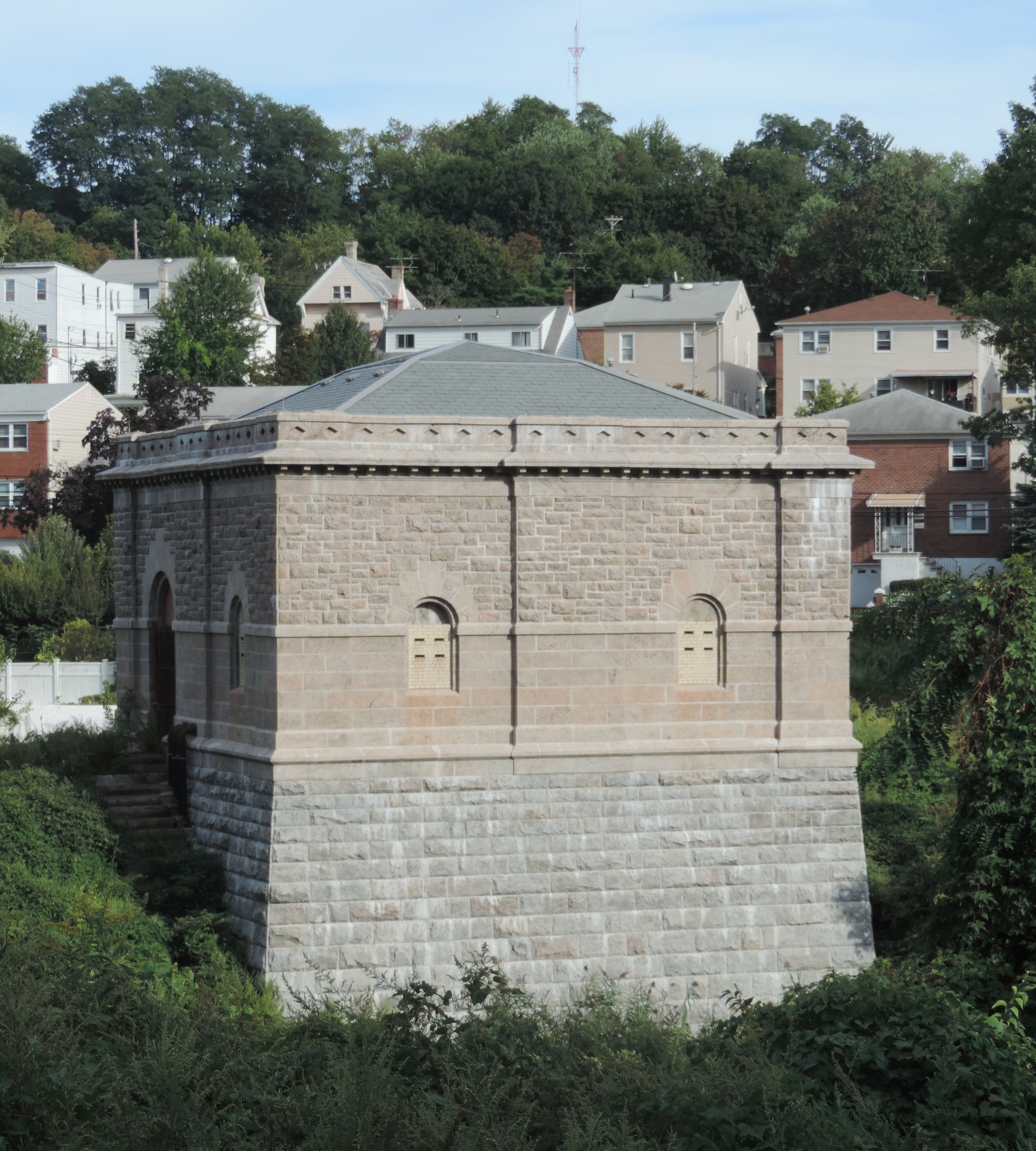
Distinctive New York City Watershed building in Yonkers for shaft of New Croton Aqueduct

The New Croton Aqueduct opened on July 15, 1890, replacing the Old Croton Aqueduct. The newer aqueduct is a brick-lined tunnel, 13 feet (4.0 m) in diameter and 33 miles (53 km) long, running from the New Croton Reservoir in Westchester County to the Jerome Park Reservoir in the Bronx. Water flows then proceed toward the Croton Water Filtration Plant for treatment. Treated water is distributed to certain areas of the Bronx and Manhattan.

In the late 1990s, the city stopped using water from the Croton system due to numerous water quality issues. In 1997 the U.S. Environmental Protection Agency (EPA), the U.S. Department of Justice and the State of New York filed suit against the city for violating the Safe Drinking Water Act and the New York State Sanitary Code. The city government agreed to rehabilitate the New Croton Aqueduct and build a filtration plant. The filtration system protects the public from disease-causing microorganisms such as Giardia and Cryptosporidium. The Croton Water Filtration Plant was activated in May 2015.

== See also ==
- New York City water supply system
- Water supply network
