= New Croton Reservoir =

Reservoir

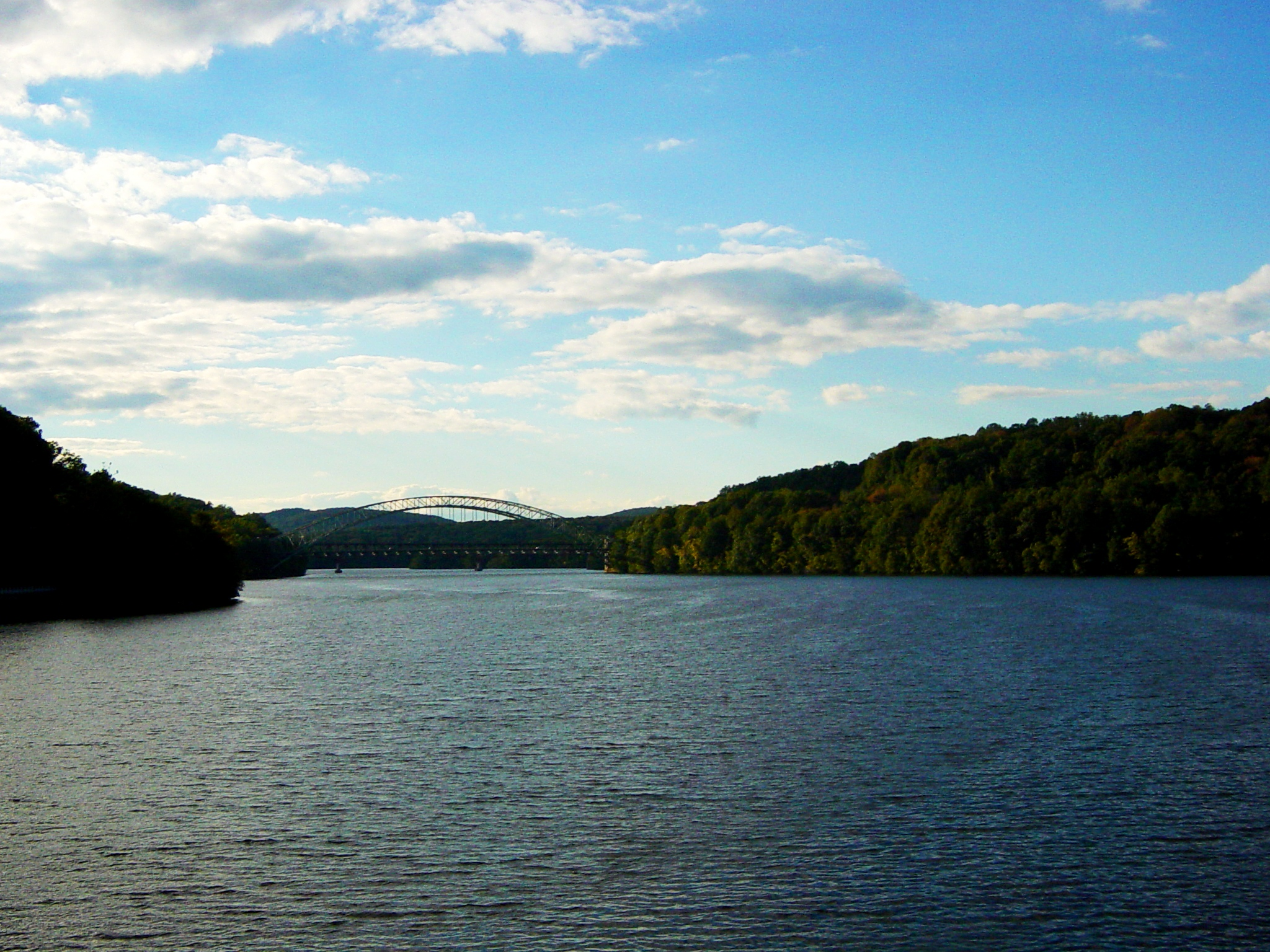

- Location within New York
- Location: Westchester County, New York
- Coordinates: 41°13′58.65″N 73°50′23.27″W
- Type: reservoir
- Primary inflows: Croton River
- Primary outflows: Croton River
- Catchment area: 57 sq mi (150 km^{2})
- Basin countries: United States
- Built: 1906
- Max. length: 9 mi (14 km)
- Surface area: 2,160 acres (870 ha)
- Water volume: 19 billion U.S. gallons (72 million cubic meters)
- Surface elevation: 194 ft (59 m)

The New Croton Reservoir is a reservoir in Westchester County, New York, part of the New York City water supply system lying approximately 22 miles (35 km) north of New York City. It is the collecting point for water from all reservoirs in the Croton Watershed. The reservoir is the start and source of water for the New Croton Aqueduct, which carries water to the Jerome Park Reservoir in the Bronx for distribution to New York City.

== History ==
In 1842 the Croton River, a tributary of the Hudson River, was impounded by the Old Croton Dam to create Croton Lake. This was New York City's first source of water beyond its city limits. Its waters traveled by aqueduct to the Croton Distributing Reservoir in midtown Manhattan.

Construction on a New Croton Dam began in 1892. In 1900, the workers (primarily Italian immigrants, Irish immigrants and African-Americans) constructing the dam went on strike to protest unfair wages. The New York State National Guard was called in to protect replacement workers and violence ensued.

In 1906, the New Croton Dam was completed, expanding the existing impoundment into the New Croton Reservoir, then the largest in the Croton Watershed, and thus one of the largest in the New York City water supply system to that point. It has a 57 square mile (148 km^{2}) drainage basin, is approximately 9 miles (14 km) long, and can hold 19 billion US gallons (72,000,000 m^{3}) of water at full capacity.

Its waters flow into the New Croton Aqueduct, then into the Jerome Park Reservoir in the Bronx. Water from the Jerome Park Reservoir is normally distributed to parts of Manhattan, the Bronx, and western Queens.

== Gallery ==
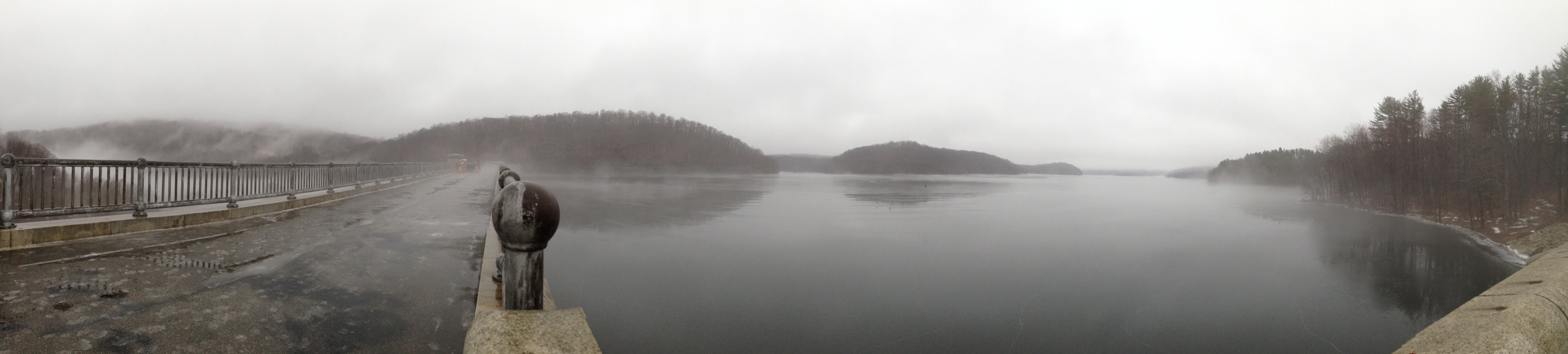
Panoramic view of New Croton Reservoir and pedestrian way over the New Croton Dam
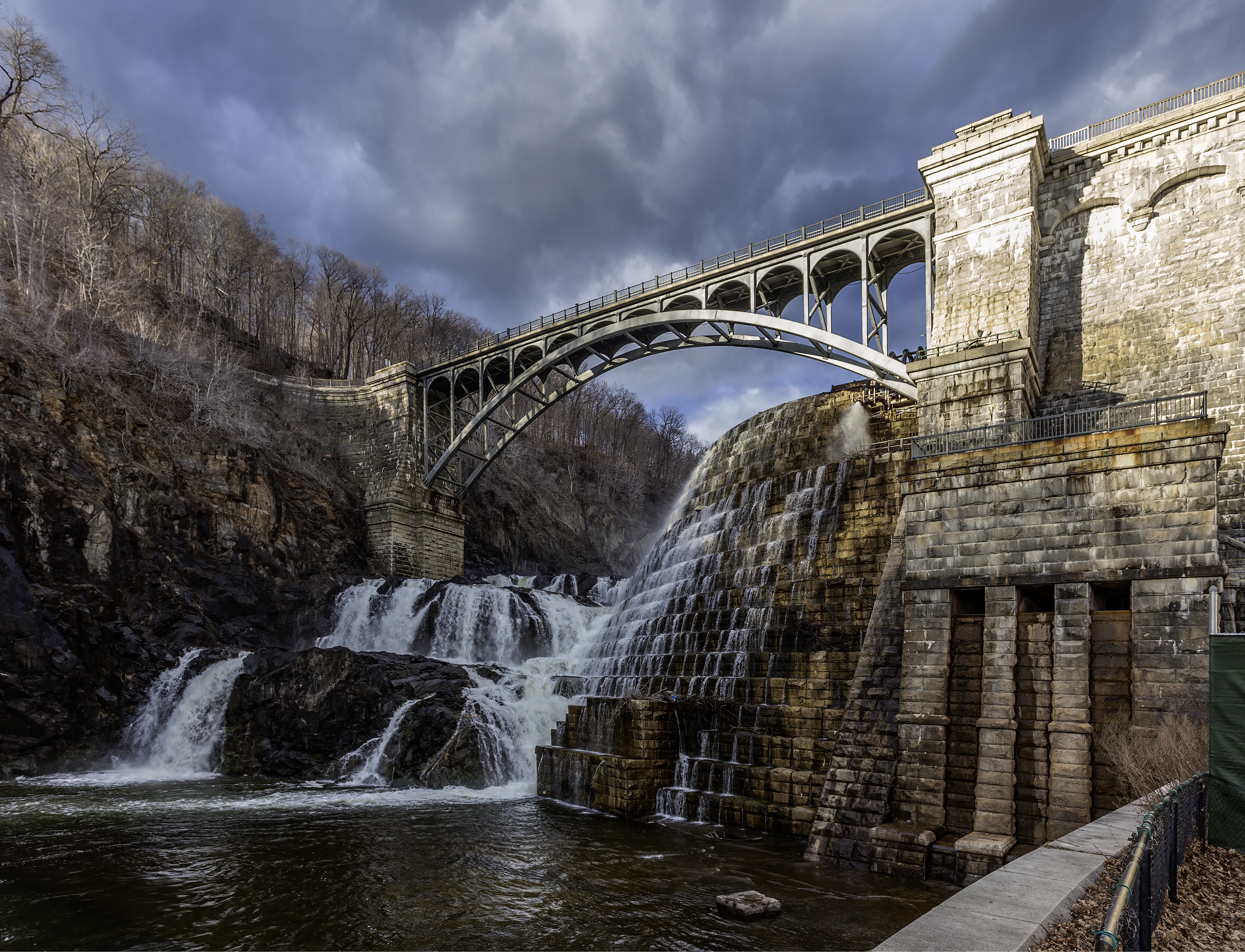
New Croton Dam in 2016

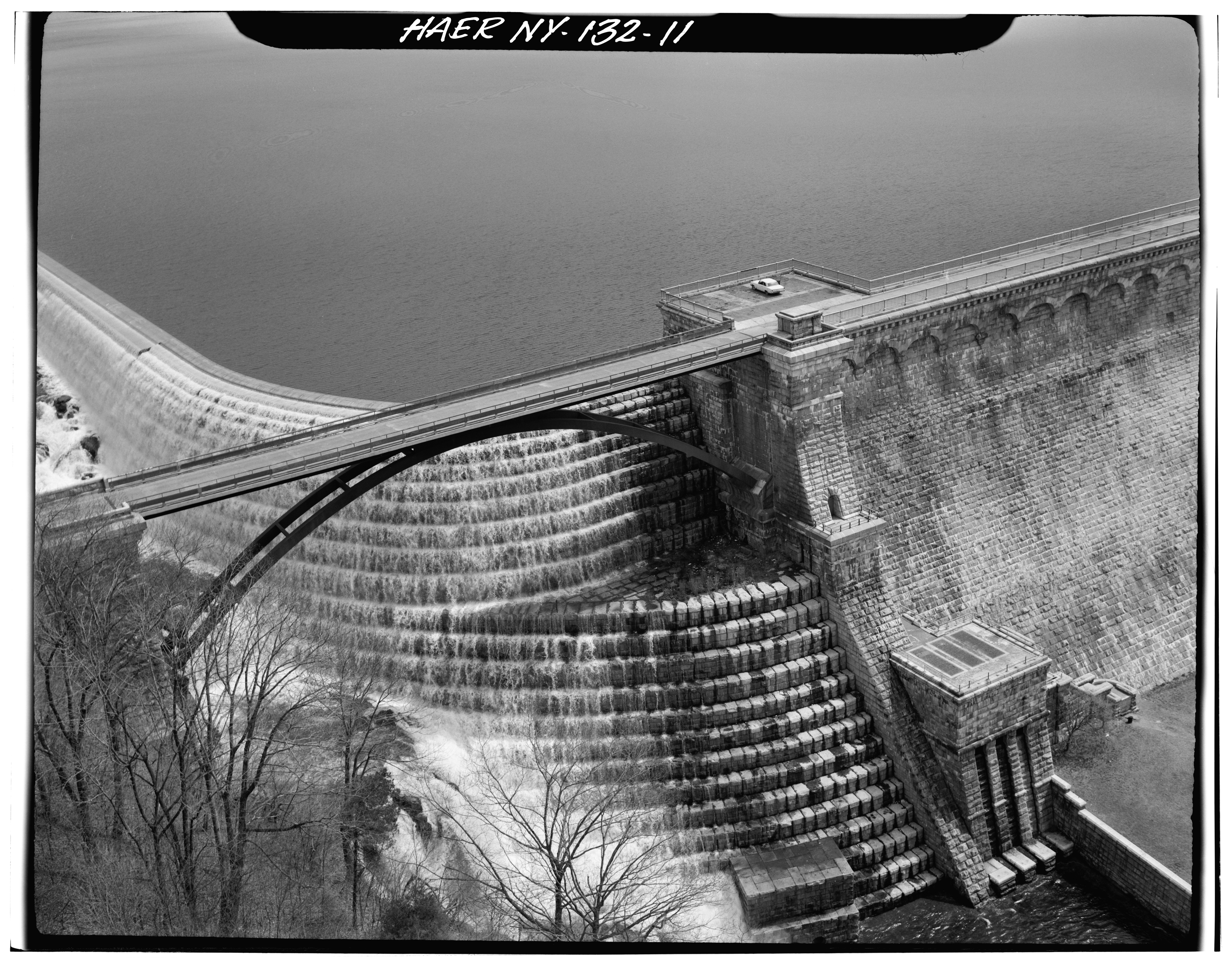
Spillway (after 1968)

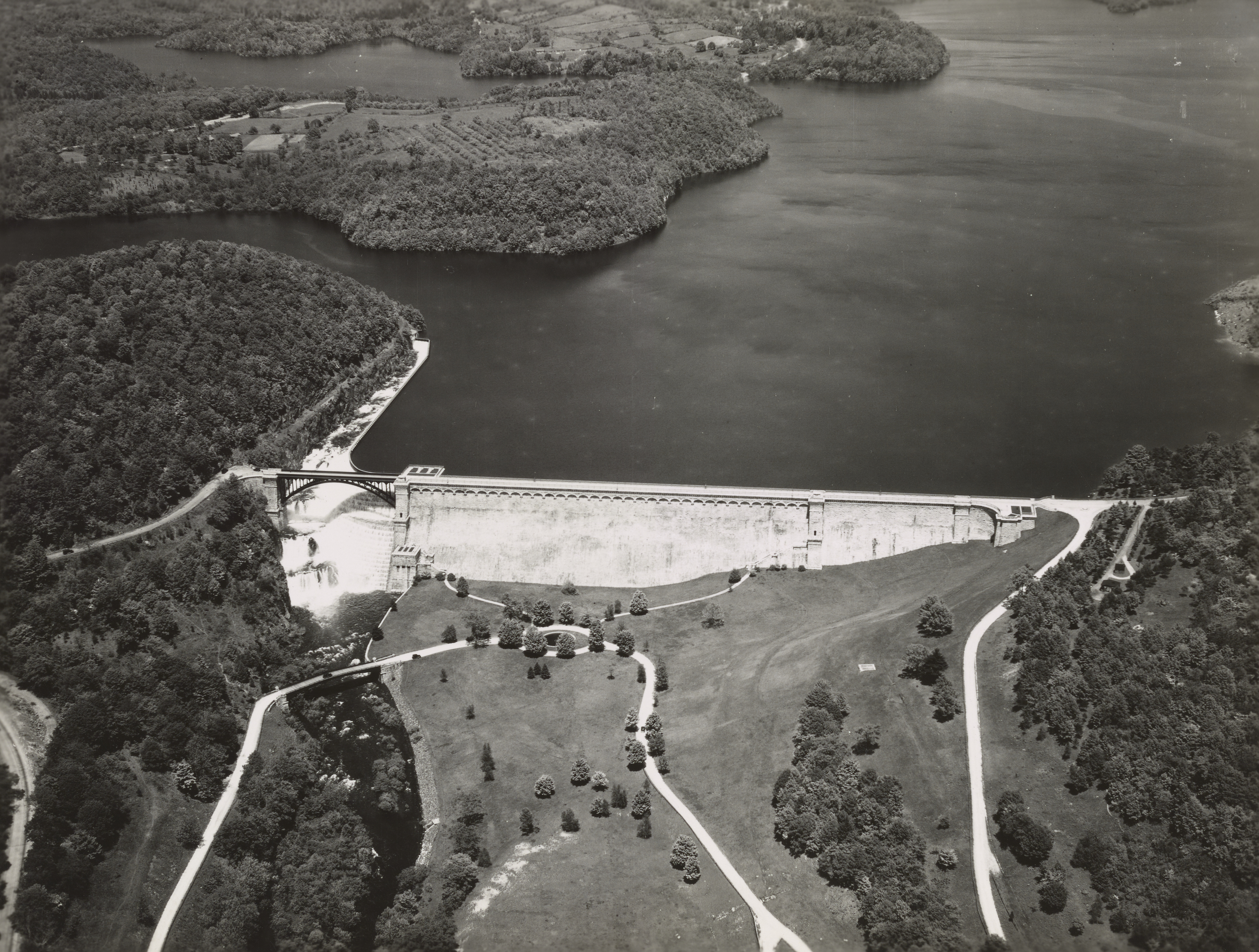
Aerial of the reservoir (May, 1931)

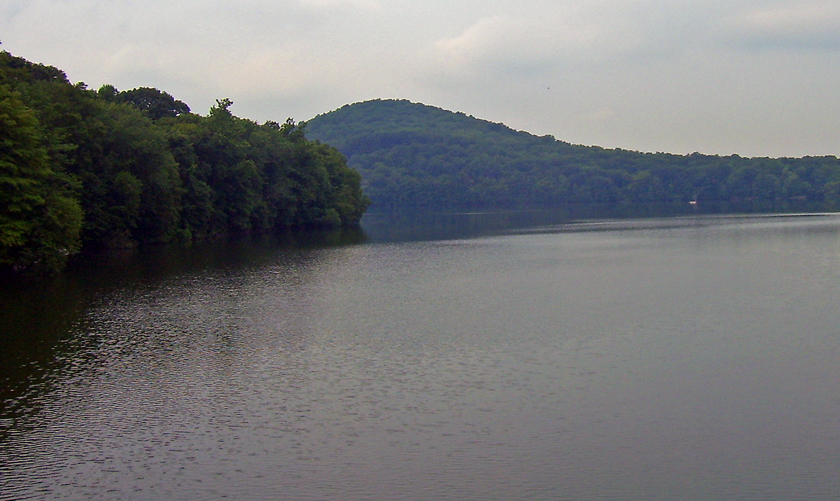
Perspective of the reservoir

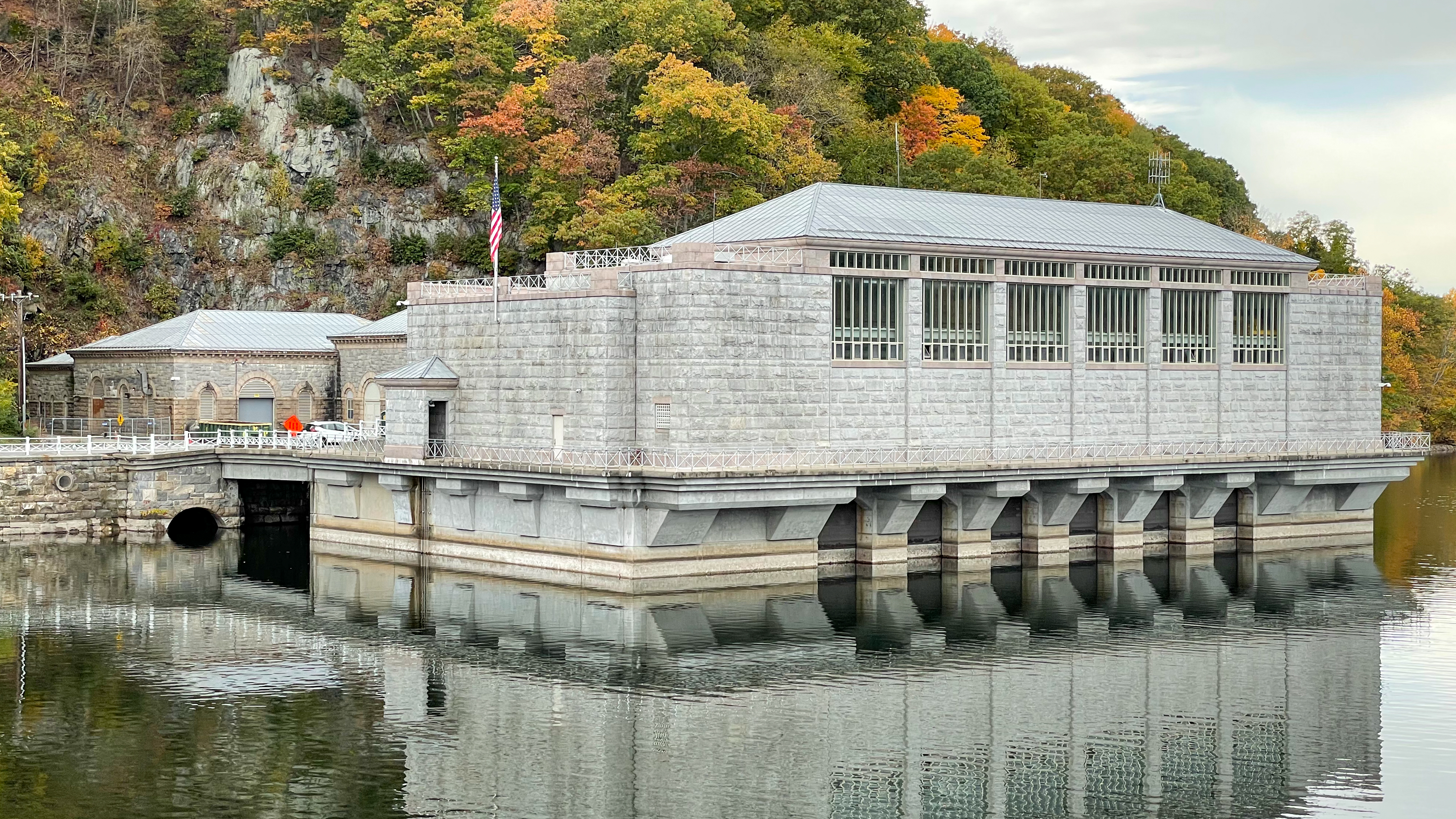
Water treatment at the reservoir

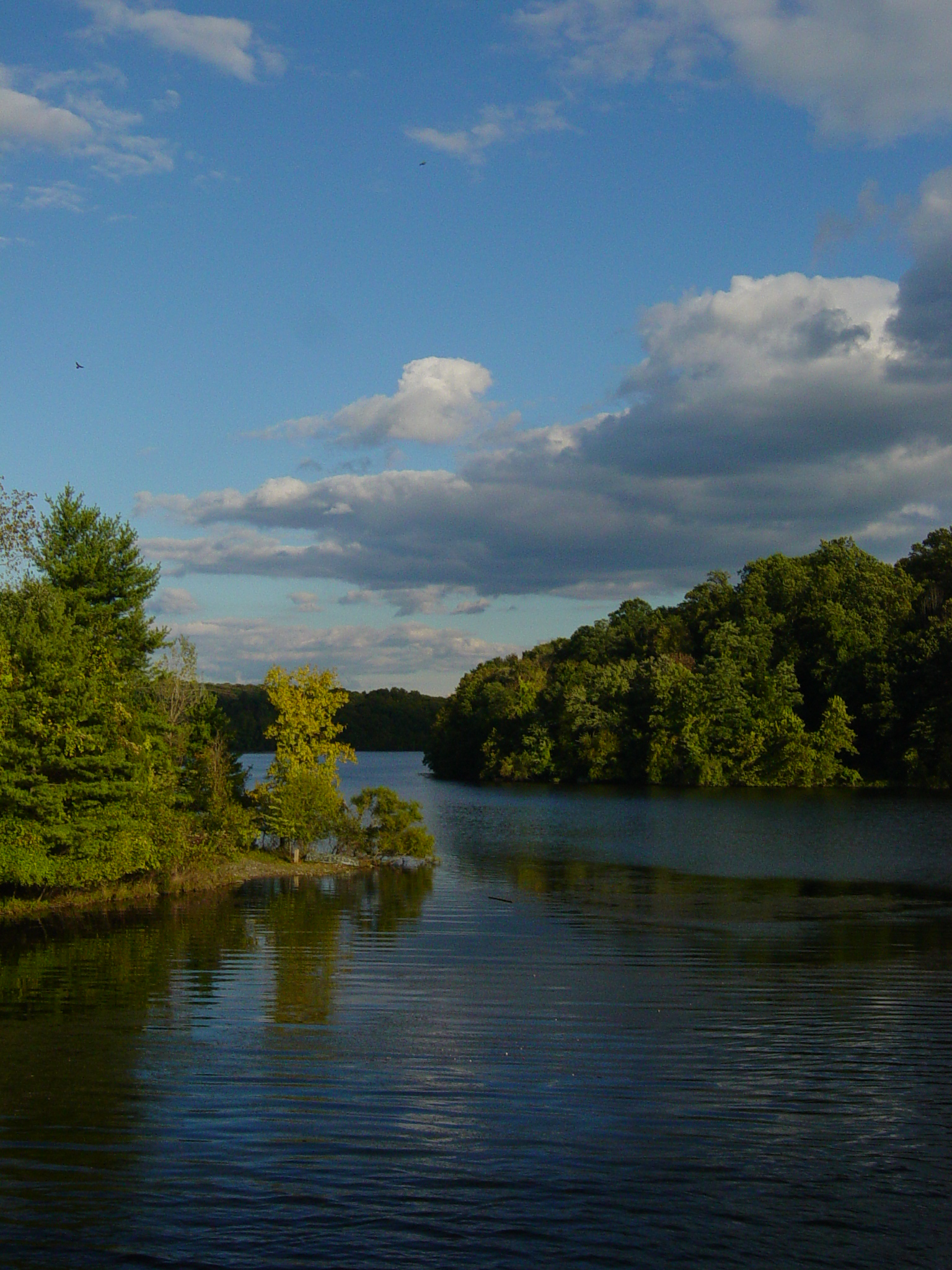
October 2003

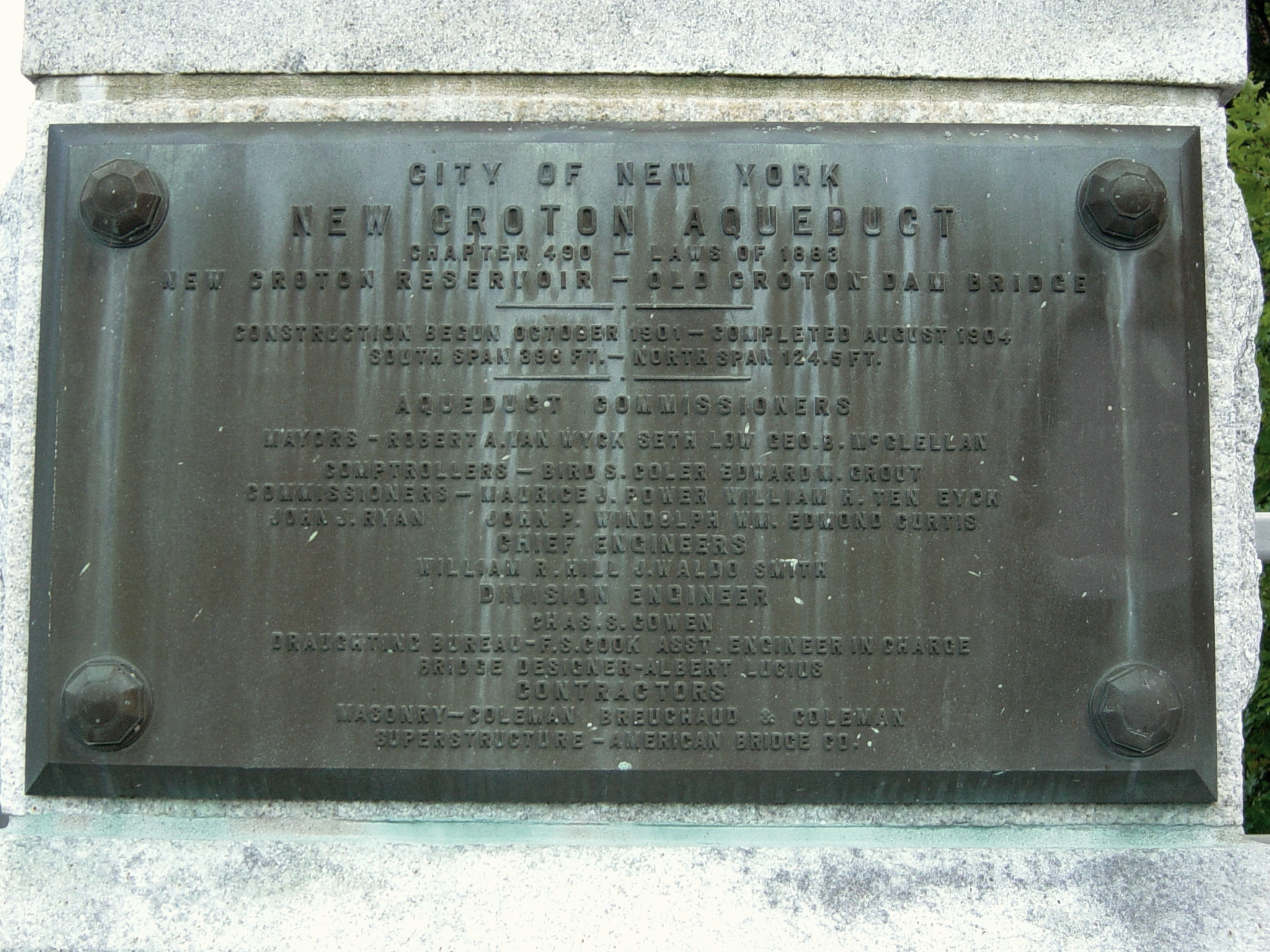
Plaque at the New Croton Aqueduct

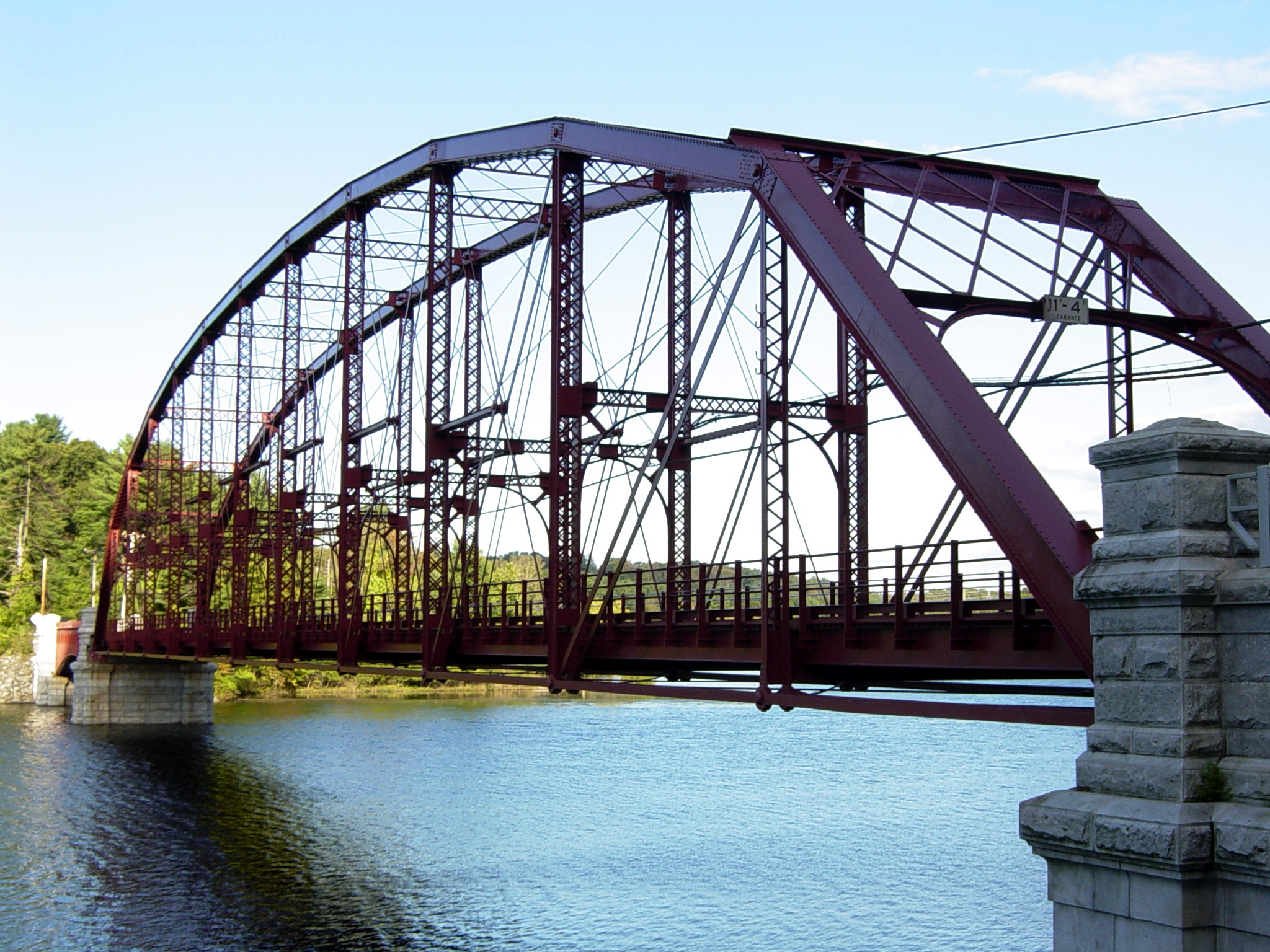
Gate House Bridge - one of several bridges transversing the reservoir

== See also ==
- Old Croton Aqueduct
- New Croton Aqueduct
- List of reservoirs and dams in New York
- New York City water supply system
