= Jerome Park Reservoir =

Reservoir in the Bronx, New York

- U.S. National Register of Historic Places
- U.S. Historic district
- New York State Register of Historic Places
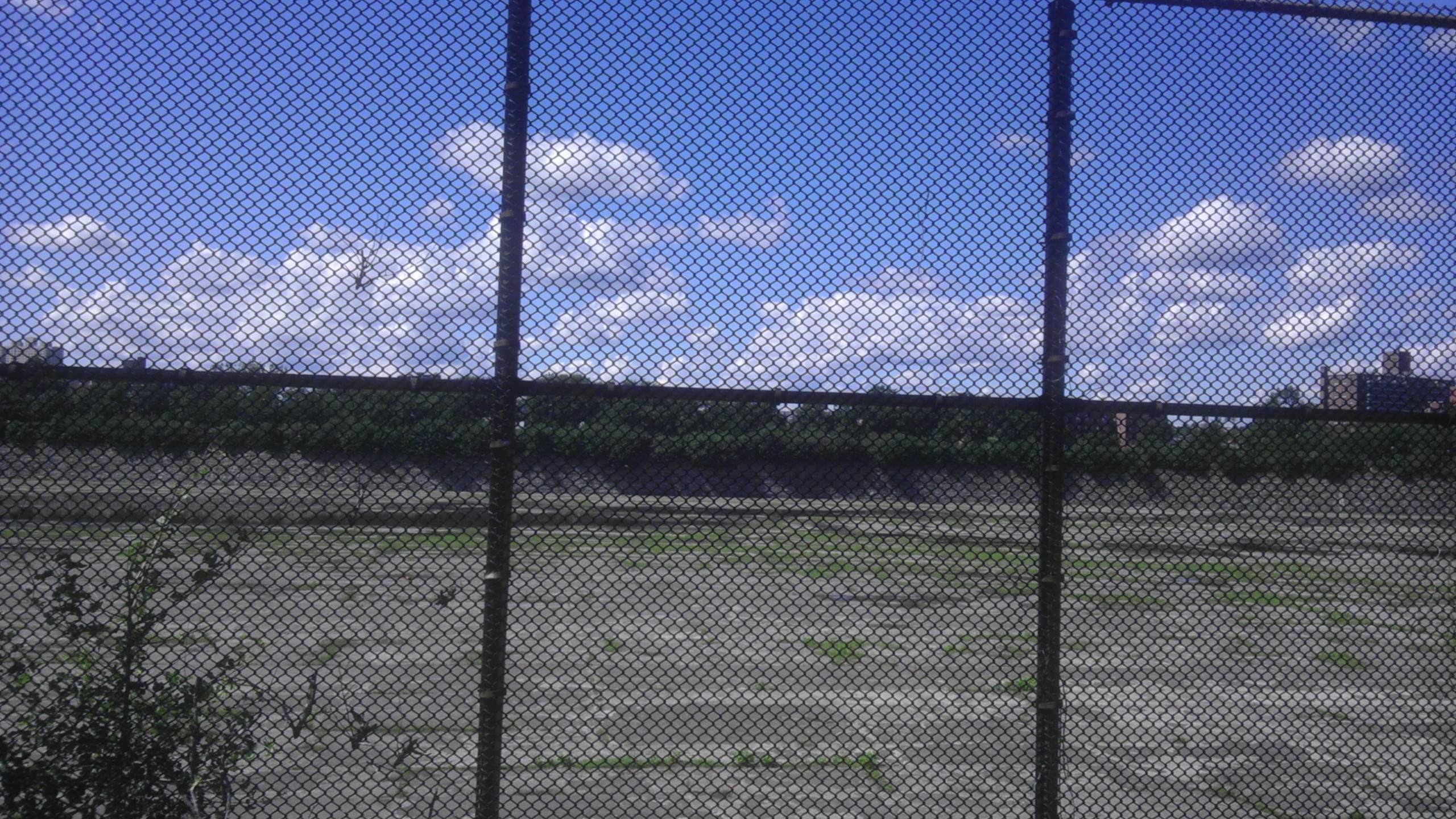

- Location within New York City Location within New York Location within the United States
- Location: Goulden, Reservoir and Sedgwick Aves., Bronx, New York
- Coordinates: 40°52′40″N 73°53′44″W
- Built: 1906
- Architectural style: Art Deco
- NRHP reference No.: 00001014
- NYSRHP No.: 00501.000827

Significant dates
- Added to NRHP: September 7, 2000
- Designated NYSRHP: November 17, 2001

The Jerome Park Reservoir is a reservoir of the New York City water supply system located in Jerome Park in the borough of the Bronx in New York City.

== History ==
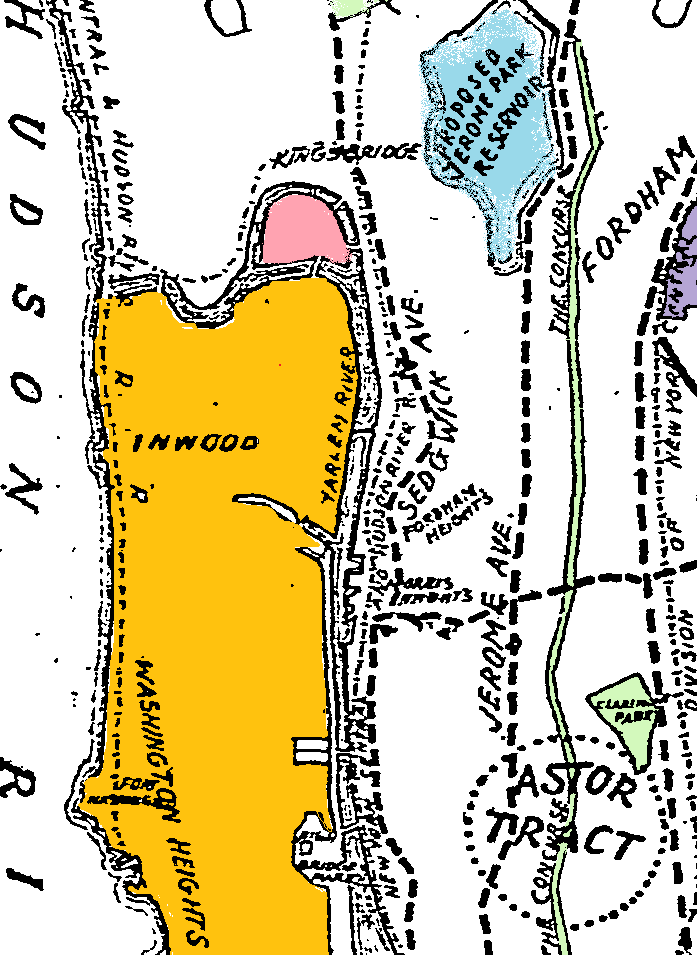
1896 New York Times map of proposed reservoir

The reservoir was completed in 1906, built to receive the waters of the New York City water supply system's New Croton aqueduct. The land had belonged to the Jerome Park Racetrack, which was condemned, bought by New York City, and closed in 1889. The track had been part of the former Old Bathgate Estate owned by Winston Churchill's maternal grandfather Leonard Walter Jerome (1817–1891), for whom the racetrack was originally named; it opened in 1866 and was the site of the inaugural Belmont Stakes the following year.

The reservoir is located in the North Bronx, New York City. It is surrounded by DeWitt Clinton High School, the Bronx High School of Science, Lehman College, and Walton High School. In 1996, residents organized under the leadership of Jerome Park Conservancy to stop the city from converting the site to a water treatment plant; the effort was successful.

The reservoir was listed on the National Register of Historic Places in 2000. The related High Pumping Station had been listed in 1983.

The Croton Water Filtration Plant was built in another part of the North Bronx underneath Van Cortlandt Park. In connection with this work, the Croton system was taken offline and the reservoir emptied in December 2008. It was refilled and returned to service in early 2014. In November 2015, the DEP experimentally opened the perimeter to the public for tours.
