= Van Cortlandt Golf Course =

Golf course in New York City, US

- Interactive map of Van Cortlandt Golf Course
- 40°53′21″N 73°53′33″W

Club information
- Location: Bronx, New York
- Established: 1895
- Type: Public
- Operator: New York City Department of Parks & Recreation
- Tota holes: 18

Van Cortlandt Golf Course, sometimes known as Van Cortlandt Park Golf Course and frequently called Vanny or Vannie is one of New York City's municipal golf courses and the oldest public golf course in the United States. The course is a part of Van Cortlandt Park and is adjacent in some spots to the nearby Mosholu Golf Course.

The course was established in 1895 as a nine-hole course and expanded to eighteen holes in 1899. The clubhouse dates to 1902, and its locker room was used as a filming location for the 1987 movie Wall Street.
