= 1968 NCAA University Division cross country championships =

1968 cross-country running meet of the NCAA (University Division)

1968 NCAA University Division Cross Country Championships
- Organisers: NCAA
- Edition: 30th
- Date: November 25, 1968
- Host city: (New York (state)) Bronx, New York City, NY; Manhattan College
- Venue: Van Cortlandt Park
- Distances: 6 miles (9.7 km)
- Participation: 217 athletes

The 1968 NCAA University Division Cross Country Championships were the 30th annual cross country meet to determine the team and individual national champions of men's collegiate cross country running in the United States. Held on November 25, 1968, the meet was hosted by Manhattan College at Van Cortlandt Park in the Bronx, New York City, New York. The distance for this race was 6 miles (9.7 kilometers).

All NCAA University Division members were eligible to qualify for the meet. In total, 24 teams and 217 individual runners contested this championship.

The team national championship was again retained by the Villanova Wildcats, their third title. The individual championship was won by Michael Ryan, from Air Force, with a time of 29:16.8.

== Men's title ==
- Distance: 6 miles (9.7 kilometers)

=== Team Result (Top 10) ===
Rank	Team	Points
1st place, gold medalist(s)	Villanova	78
2nd place, silver medalist(s)	Stanford	100
3rd place, bronze medalist(s)	USC	115
4	Minnesota	239
5	Colorado	241
6	San Diego State	247
7	Drake	255
8	Caltech	273
9	Harvard	276
10	Miami (OH)	277

== See also ==
- NCAA Men's Division II Cross Country Championship
