= 1969 NCAA University Division cross country championships =

1969 cross-country running meet of the NCAA (University Division)

1969 NCAA University Division Cross Country Championships
- Organisers: NCAA
- Edition: 31st
- Date: November 24, 1969
- Host city: (New York (state)) Bronx, New York City, NY; Manhattan College
- Venue: Van Cortlandt Park
- Distances: 6 miles (9.7 km)
- Participation: 254 athletes

The 1969 NCAA University Division Men's Cross Country Championships were the 31st annual cross country meet to determine the team and individual national champions of men's collegiate cross country running in the United States. Held on November 24, 1969, the meet was hosted by Manhattan College at Van Cortlandt Park in the Bronx, New York City, New York. The distance for this race was 6 miles (9.7 kilometers).

All NCAA University Division members were eligible to qualify for the meet. In total, 29 teams and 254 individual runners contested this championship.

The team national championship was won by the UTEP Miners, their first title. The individual championship was won by Gerry Lindgren, from Washington State, his third title, with a time of 28:59.20. As of 2016, Lindgren remains one of four runners (Steve Prefontaine, Henry Rono, and Edward Cheserek are the others) to win three individual cross country national championships. Prefontaine finished third in 1969 and would go on to win the following three years.

== Men's title ==
- Distance: 6 miles (9.7 kilometers)

=== Team Result (Top 10) ===
Rank	Team	Points
1st place, gold medalist(s)	UTEP	74
2nd place, silver medalist(s)	Villanova	88
3rd place, bronze medalist(s)	Oregon	112
4	Washington State	183
5	Illinois	200
6	Western Michigan	220
7	Minnesota	287
8	Penn	292
9	Bowling Green State	325
10	Penn State; Connecticut	345

== See also ==
- NCAA Men's Division II Cross Country Championship
