= Croton Water Filtration Plant =

Water treatment facility in New York City

- Alternative names: Croton Filtration Plant
- Etymology: Croton River

General information
- Status: Completed
- Type: Water treatment facility
- Location: Mosholu Golf Course, Van Cortlandt Park, The Bronx, New York, US
- Coordinates: 40°53′11″N 73°52′53″W
- Named for: Croton Watershed
- Construction started: 2007
- Completed: 2015
- Cost: $3.2 billion USD
- Client: New York City Department of Parks and Recreation
- Owner: City of New York
- Operator: New York City Department of Environmental Protection (NYCDEP)

Technical details
- Grounds: 12 acres (4.9 ha)

Design and construction
- Architecture firm: below grade water treatment plant: Hazen and Sawyer and Metcalf and Eddy; above grade: Grimshaw Architects
- Developer: Skanska / Tully Construction joint venture
- Other designers: Emerson Process Management

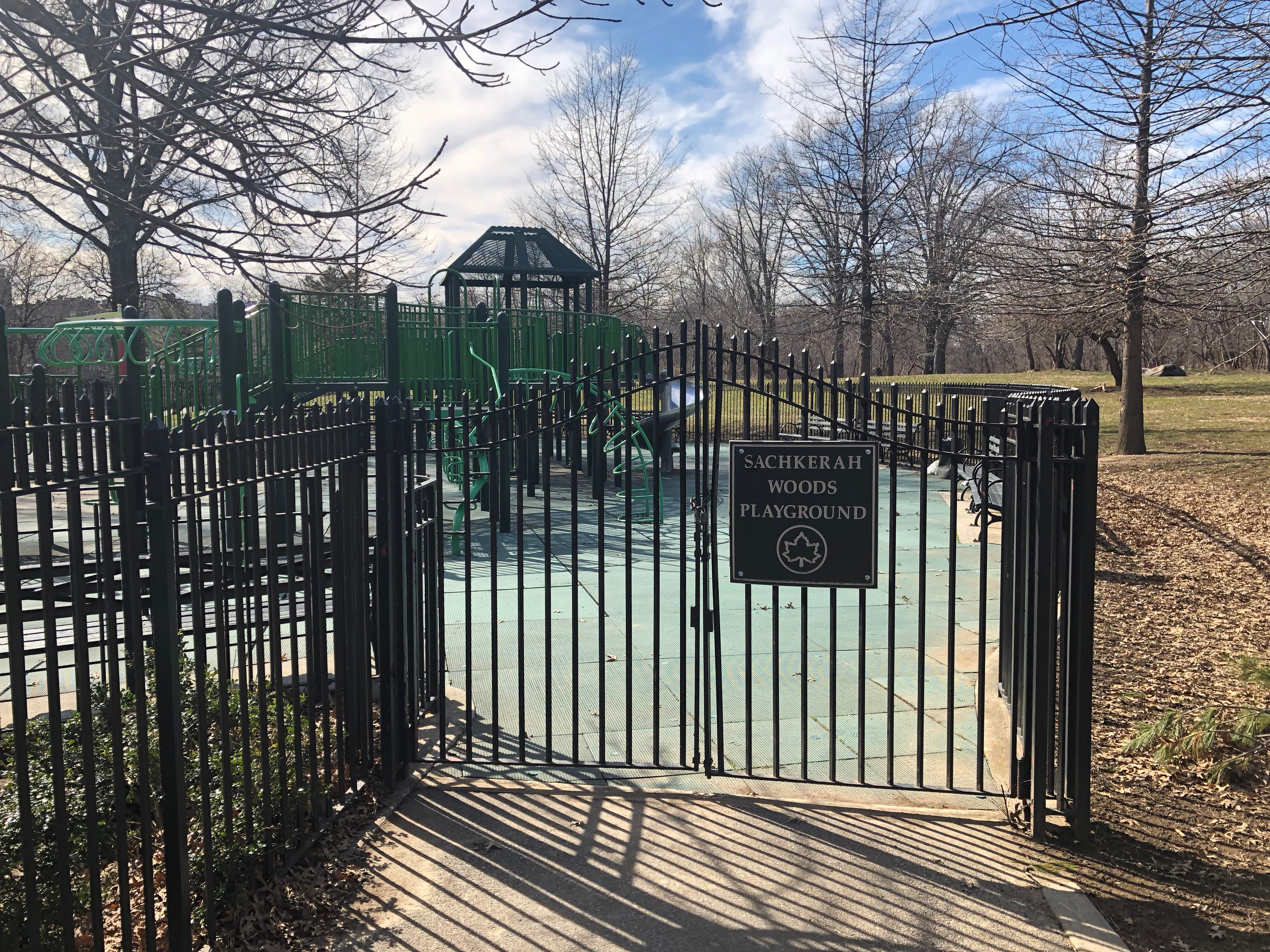
The Sachkerah Woods Playground, located at Van Cortlandt Park's southeast corner

The Croton Water Filtration Plant is a drinking water treatment facility in the Bronx, New York City, which began operation in 2015. The plant construction cost was over $3 billion. Part of the New York City water supply system, the facility was built 160 feet (49 m) under Mosholu Golf Course in Van Cortlandt Park.

== Background ==
Through the early 21st century, the three aqueduct systems that supply water to the city utilized chlorination technology, but not filtration (unlike many other large municipal water systems in the US). The water in the Croton Aqueduct system, the oldest of the three, draws from the Croton Watershed, which is more heavily developed than the Catskill/Delaware watershed that supplies the rest of the city's water. Water from the Croton system began periodically failing to meet taste, odor, and color requirements in the 1990s. In 2002, water from the Croton system exceeded federal turbidity standards, and the U.S. Environmental Protection Agency (EPA) stated that the planned filtration plant would "virtually eliminate turbidity" in the water. The Croton system supplies about ten percent of the New York City water system and building a filtration system to address the water quality problems had been proposed since the 1990s.

The Croton filtration plant was built after a lawsuit was filed in 1997 against the City of New York by the U.S. Environmental Protection Agency (EPA), the U.S. Department of Justice and the State of New York. The city settled the suit and a consent decree was issued with the condition that the city would build the plant by 2006. The city had been studying possible sites for such a plant for more than 20 years in both the Bronx and nearby Westchester County. The plant protects the public from microorganisms like Giardia and Cryptosporidium, which can cause serious health problems. The project was spearheaded by then Commissioner Christopher O. Ward.

According to city officials, by improving the overall reliability of the Croton water supply, the plant reduces New York City's dependence on its two other water sources, the Catskill Aqueduct and Delaware Aqueduct, giving the city more flexibility in how it handles repairs and more "resiliency against the impacts of climate change." When the city began planning the Croton filtration plant, water from the Catskill and Delaware aqueducts was only minimally filtered. Subsequently the city built the Catskill-Delaware Water Ultraviolet Disinfection Facility, which began operation in 2013.

== Design ==
Raw water is delivered to the filtration plant by the New Croton Aqueduct and the Jerome Park Reservoir. The Croton plant has a capacity of 290 million U.S. gallons (1.1 billion liters) per day and is designed to remove 99.9% of Giardia cysts, Cryptosporidium, and viruses. The system uses conventional drinking water treatment technologies:

- Coagulation and flocculation, and chemical balancing
- Dissolved air flotation and dual media filtration (activated coal and sand)
- Ultraviolet and chlorine disinfection
- Corrosion control (orthophosphate)
- Fluoridation.

== Project delays, costs and completion ==
The filtration plant was originally projected to cost $800 million, but the project experienced delays and ballooning costs due to objections from the local community, which required the city to propose alternate sites for such a plant.

To lessen the disruption caused by the plant's construction, in 2010 the city used mitigation funds from the construction budget to restore the Van Cortlandt Park Parade Ground. The Sachkerah Woods Playground, located at the park's southeast corner near the Mosholu Golf Course, was also built using Croton mitigation funds. The new plant allowed the city to provide greater capacity for its water system. This was especially important since the city was preparing to shut off part of the Delaware Aqueduct in 2022 allowing the completion of a tunnel that would bypass a leaking section of the aqueduct in Newburgh, New York.

In May 2015 the New York City Department of Environmental Protection announced that the Croton filtration plant had been recently activated. The final project cost was $3.2 billion. The 830 by 550 feet (250 by 170 m) plant is larger than Yankee Stadium.

== See also ==
- Catskill-Delaware Water Ultraviolet Disinfection Facility
- Newtown Creek Wastewater Treatment Plant
- North River Wastewater Treatment Plant

== Sources ==
- Jackson, Kenneth T., ed. (2010). The Encyclopedia of New York City (2nd ed.). New Haven: Yale University Press. ISBN 978-0-300-11465-2.
- "Van Cortlandt Park Master Plan 2030". New York City Parks Department. July 15, 2014.
