= Van Cortlandt Park =

Large public park in the Bronx, New York

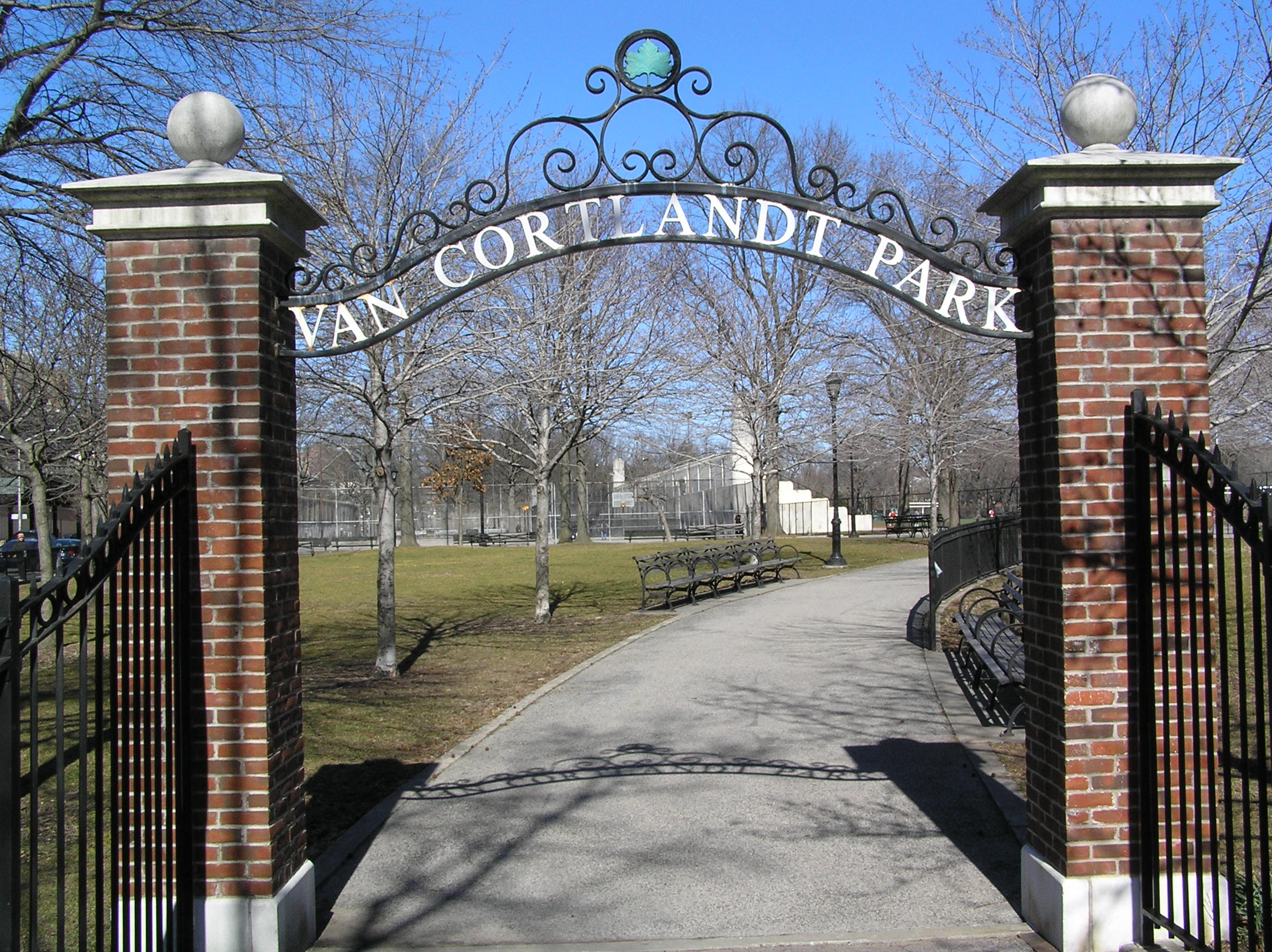
- An entrance to Van Cortlandt Park
- Interactive map of Van Cortlandt Park
- Type: Municipal
- Location: The Bronx, New York City, New York, US
- Coordinates: 40°53′52″N 73°53′02″W
- Area: 1,146 acres (464 ha) (Note: It has also been described as being the fourth-largest park at 1,122 acres (454 ha), if Flushing Meadows–Corona Park in Queens was counted at 1,255 acres (508 ha). However, a resurveying in 2013 concluded that Van Cortlandt Park was 1,146 acres, while Flushing Meadows–Corona Park was calculated at a smaller 897 acres (363 ha).)
- Created: 1888
- Operator: NYC Parks (Note: Maintenance and upkeep is also performed by Van Cortlandt Park Alliance, which is composed of the Van Cortlandt Park Conservancy and Friends of Van Cortlandt Park.)
- Status: Open
- Public transit: New York City Subway: Woodlawn ( train) and Van Cortlandt Park–242nd Street ( train) stations New York City Bus: Bx9, Bx10, Bx16, Bx34 local buses, BxM3, BxM4 express buses Bee-Line Bus System: 1, 2, 3, 4, 20, and 21

Van Cortlandt Park is a 1,146-acre (464 ha) park located in the borough of the Bronx in New York City. Owned by the New York City Department of Parks and Recreation, it is managed with assistance from the Van Cortlandt Park Alliance. The park, the city's third-largest, was named for the Van Cortlandt family, which was prominent in the area during the Dutch and English colonial periods.

Van Cortlandt Park's sports facilities include golf courses and several miles of paths for running, as well as facilities for baseball, basketball, cricket, cross-country running, football, horseback riding, lacrosse, rugby, soccer, softball, swimming, tennis and track and field. The park also contains five major hiking trails and other walking trails. Its natural features include Tibbetts Brook; Van Cortlandt Lake, the largest freshwater lake in the Bronx; old-growth forests; and outcrops of Fordham gneiss and Inwood marble. Contained within the park is the Van Cortlandt House, the oldest known surviving house in the Bronx, and the Van Cortlandt Golf Course, the oldest public golf course in the country.

The land that Van Cortlandt Park now occupies was purchased by Jacobus Van Cortlandt from John Barrett around 1691. His son Frederick built the Van Cortlandt House on the property, but died before its completion. Later, the land was used during the Revolutionary War when the Stockbridge militia was destroyed by the Queen's Rangers. In 1888, the family property was sold to the City of New York and made into a public parkland. The Van Cortlandt House, later designated as a historic landmark, was converted into a public museum, and new paths were created across the property to make it more passable.

In the 1930s, the Robert Moses–directed construction of the Henry Hudson Parkway and Mosholu Parkway fragmented Van Cortlandt Park into its six discontinuous pieces. The last remaining freshwater marsh in New York State, Tibbetts Brook, was dredged and landscaped to accommodate construction, causing large-scale ecological disruption within the park. The 1975 New York City fiscal crisis caused much of the park to fall into disrepair. Gradual improvements began taking place from the late 1980s on including the addition of new pathways, signage, and security. In 2014, the "Van Cortlandt Park Master Plan 2034" was published.

== History ==
=== Settlement and colonization ===
The forest in what is now Van Cortlandt Park has been around for 17,000 years, since the end of the Wisconsin glaciation. The Wiechquaskeck, a Wappinger people, were among the first recorded people to inhabit in the area now referred to as Van Cortlandt Park. They settled in the area around the 14th or 15th centuries. The Lenapes used the geographic features of the area to support their community; for instance, they used the Tibbetts Brook, Spuyten Duyvil Creek, or Hudson River for fishing, and flatland areas for farming. They formed a village named Keskeskick, whose name roughly translates to "sharp grass or sedge marsh" in the Unami language.

The strip of land on the Hudson River's east bank, between the current-day Spuyten Duyvil Creek and Yonkers, was sold to the Dutch West India Company in the early 17th century. Adriaen van der Donck, a Dutch settler, bought the land from the company in 1646. Van der Donck also paid the Indian chief Tacharew, whose tribe used to live on the land, as a friendly gesture. He named the land "Colen Donck" and built a house upon the land. The house was built between current-day Van Cortlandt Lake and Broadway. It faced south, probably because this was the location of a natural marshland. What is now the parade ground was used by van der Donck for farming.

Van der Donck died in 1655. That year the Munsee bands that lived in the lower Hudson River valley briefly occupied New Amsterdam and attacked Pavonia and Staten Island during what is known as the Peach War. This forced the settlers, including van der Donck's widow, to flee to Manhattan. Following the takeover of the New Netherland colony by the British in 1664, the claim to the estate was awarded to Hugh O'Neale, the new husband of van der Donck's widow. Because the O'Neales lived far away from the land, the claim was awarded to O'Neale's brother-in-law and van der Donck's widow's brother, Elias Doughty, who proceeded to sell off the portions of the property. In 1668, a portion of the land was sold to William Betts, an English turner, and his son-in-law George Tippett, whom Tibbetts Brook would later be named for. This property included the modern park parade grounds. Next, Doughty sold a 2,000-acre (810 ha) tract of land, including the current site of the Van Cortlandt House, to Frederick Philipse, Thomas Delavall, and Thomas Lewis. Philipse bought out Delavall's and Lewis's land shares, making the land part of the Philipsburg Manor, which extended from Spuyten Duyvil Creek to the Croton River in modern Westchester County. Philipse's wife died, and he remarried Olof Stevense Van Cortlandt's daughter, herself a widow. Philipse's daughter Eva later married Jacobus Van Cortlandt, who was Mrs. Philipse's brother.

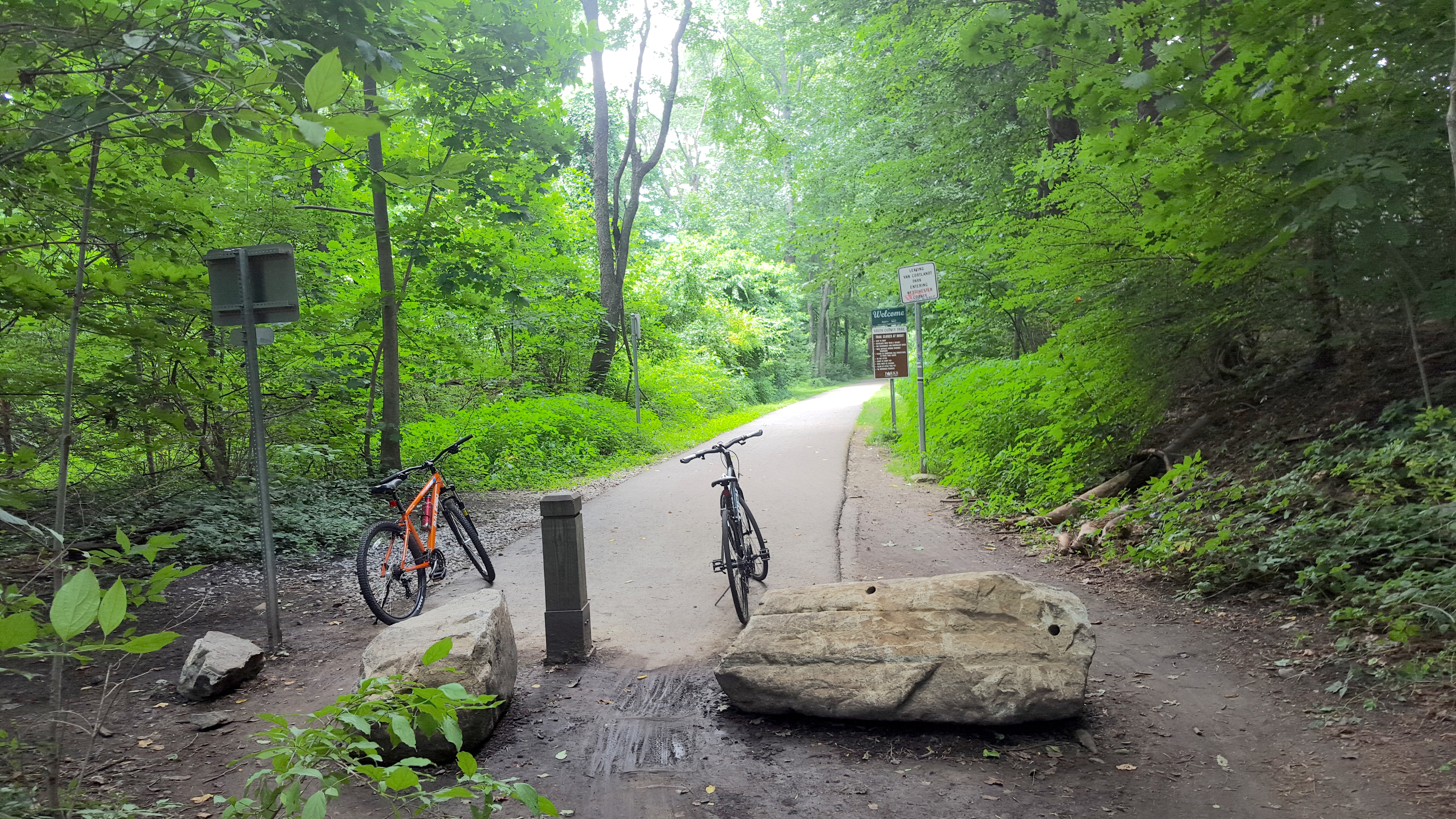
One of the park's entrances/exits at the city border

The land that Van Cortlandt Park now occupies was acquired by Van Cortlandt from Philipse in the mid-to-late 1690s. In 1699, Van Cortlandt dammed Tibbetts Brook in order to power a sawmill (and later, a gristmill,), creating Van Cortlandt Lake as a mill pond in the process. In 1732, Van Cortlandt acquired an additional parcel from the Tippett family. The estate was then passed on to Jacobus's son Frederick Van Cortlandt (1699–1749) and family in 1739; it was once a vast grain plantation. In 1748, Frederick built the Van Cortlandt House on the former Tippett property, but died before its completion. The Van Cortlandts did not primarily live in that house, instead staying in Manhattan most of the time. A family burial ground was created in 1749, later to be known as "Vault Hill." Frederick, who was buried in Vault Hill, had willed the massive home and surrounding lands to his son, James Van Cortlandt (1727–1787).

The Van Cortlandt family land was used during the American Revolution by both the Loyalists and Patriots, owing to James's leadership role early on in the revolution. On May 30, 1775, the New York Provincial Congress placed James on a committee to create a report on whether it was feasible to build a fort near his family's house. British General William Howe made the house his headquarters on November 13, 1776, thus placing it behind British-held ground. The Van Cortlandts wished to stay neutral in the war, however. Later, the grounds were used by Patriot militia leaders Comte de Rochambeau, Marquis de Lafayette, and George Washington. The house itself was Washington's headquarters after his troops were defeated in the 1776 Battle of Long Island. That same year, Augustus Van Cortlandt hid city records under Vault Hill to protect them during the war, turning them over to the new American government after the war. It was in "Indian Field," at the present-day intersection of Van Cortlandt Park East and 233rd Street, that the Stockbridge militia was destroyed by the Queen's Rangers, and 38 Indians from the militia were killed in 1778. In 1781, Washington returned to the house to strategize with Rochambeau while their troops waited outside on what is now the Parade Ground and Vault Hill. He later lit campfires outside the house to deceive the British into thinking that his troops were still on the grounds. Washington used the house one final time in 1783 after the Treaty of Paris. The British had just withdrawn their troops from Manhattan, and Washington and George Clinton were getting ready to enter the island, stopping over at the house before doing so.

In the 1830s, officials in a rapidly expanding New York City saw a need for a larger water supply. Major David Bates Douglass was appointed to perform engineering studies on the future Old Croton Aqueduct in March 1833. Douglass made estimates for the new aqueduct in 1833–1834 and John Martineau performed a separate study in 1834. Both found the proposed route, which ran through the present-day park, to be okay. Thus, in 1837, construction started on the Aqueduct, which ran 41 miles (66 km) from the Croton River upstate to the New York Public Library Main Branch and Bryant Park in midtown Manhattan. The project was built by 3,000–4,000 laborers who completed the entire aqueduct in five years. The aqueduct's builders constructed a gatehouse within the present-day park to provide access to the aqueduct's interior. The old aqueduct was supplemented by the New Croton Aqueduct in 1890, which also ran through the park. The Old Croton Aqueduct was in use until 1955, though the part that ran through the park was closed down in 1897 after the new aqueduct was connected to the Jerome Park Reservoir.

=== Planning ===
In 1876, Frederick Law Olmsted was hired to survey the Bronx and map out streets based on the local geography. Olmsted noted the natural beauty of the Van Cortlandt estate, comparing it to Central Park which he designed, and recommended the city purchase the property. Around the same time, New York Herald editor John Mullaly pushed for the creation of parks in New York City, particularly lauding the Van Cortlandt and Pell families' properties in the western and eastern Bronx respectively. He formed the New York Park Association in November 1881. There were objections to the system, which would apparently be too far from Manhattan, in addition to precluding development on the site. However, newspapers and prominent lobbyists, who supported such a park system, were able to petition the bill into the New York State Senate, and later, the New York State Assembly (the legislature's lower house). In June 1884, Governor Grover Cleveland signed the New Parks Act into law, authorizing the creation of the park system.

Legal disputes carried on for years, exacerbated by the fact that Luther R. Marsh, vice president of the New York Park Association, owned land near Van Cortlandt Park in particular. Opponents argued that building a park system would divert funds from more important infrastructure like schools and docks; that everyone in the city, instead of just the property owners near the proposed park, was required to pay taxes to pay for the parks' construction; and that since Marsh was trying to parcel off some of his land to developers, the park's size should be reduced in order to prevent him from profiting off park usage. However, most of this opposition was directed at the construction of Pelham Bay Park, which was then in Westchester. Supporters argued that the parks were for the benefit of all the city's citizens, thus justifying the citywide park tax; that the value of properties near the parks would appreciate greatly over time; that the commission had only chosen property that could easily be converted into a park; and that Pelham Bay Park would soon be annexed to the city. Ultimately, the parks were established despite the objections of major figures like Mayors William Russell Grace and Abram Hewitt; Comptroller Edward V. Loew; and Assemblymen Henry Bergh and Theodore Roosevelt.

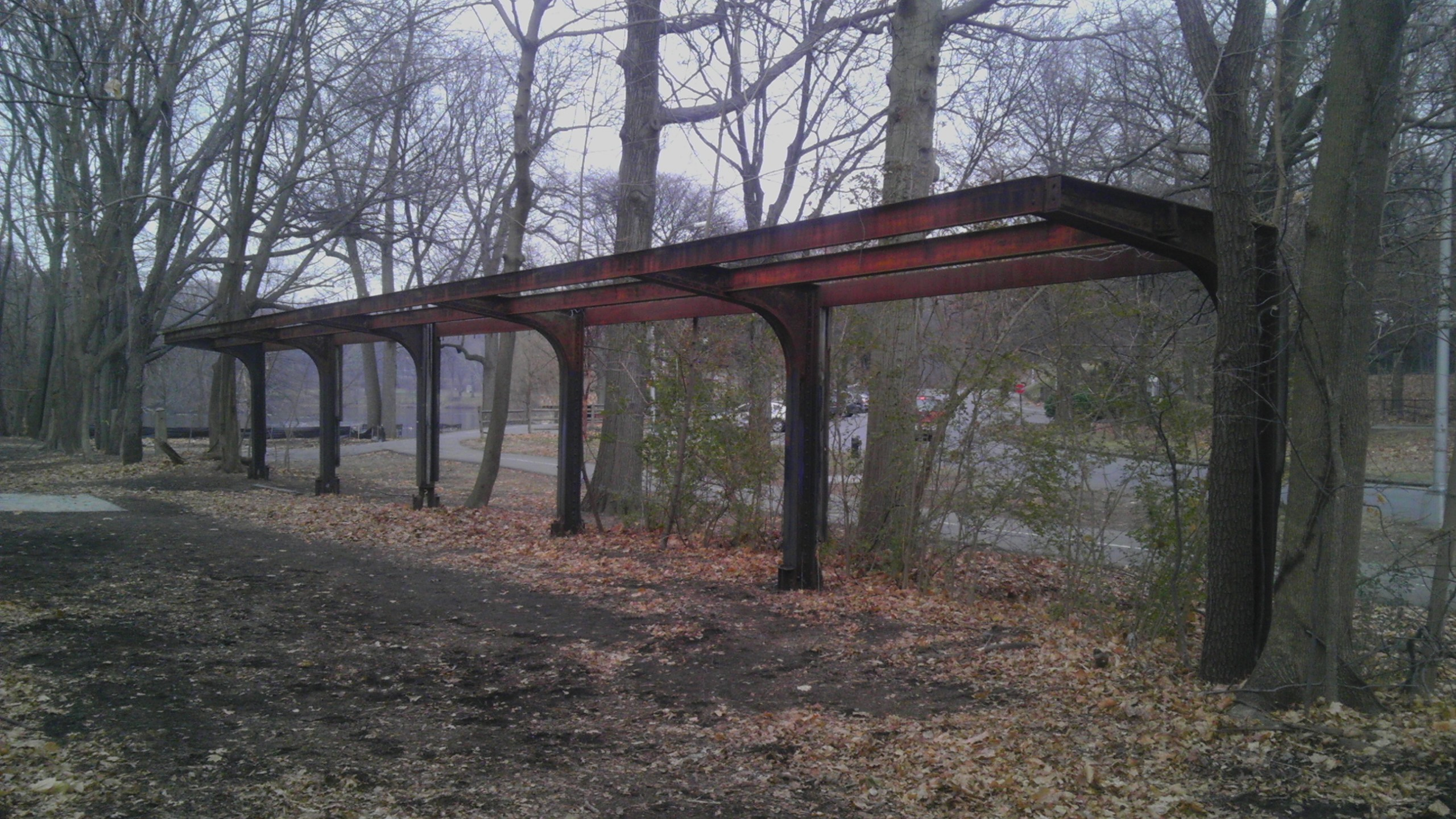
Remains of the New York and Putnam Railroad, Van Cortlandt Station inside the park

In 1880 while the new park was being planned, the New York City & Northern Railroad, later the New York and Putnam Railroad, was built through the center of the park. It had two stops in the Bronx: one inside the park, and another to the south at Kingsbridge. South of Kingsbridge, the railroad merged with the present-day Hudson Line of the Metro-North Railroad. The tracks were used for passenger traffic until 1958, and by freight trains until 1981. A shuttle train was operated by Yonkers Rapid Transit Railway between Kingsbridge and Yonkers. It ran off the main New York and Putnam Railroad line immediately north of the Van Cortlandt station. Service began in March 1888 and ran until 1942 (see § Former railroads).

=== Creation ===
The family property was sold to the City of New York and made into a public parkland in 1888. The majority of the grain fields were converted into a sprawling lawn dubbed the "Parade Ground," while the Van Cortlandt House was converted into a public museum. The construction of the Parade Ground required demolition of a few old buildings and cornfields. The Parade Ground was immediately used by the National Guard for brigade practice, replacing the parade ground of Prospect Park. The ground received unspecified "improvements" in 1893–1894. With the city's approval, particularly overgrown areas of the property were made passable. Wide walking paths were built over original walkways, including the thin paths that led to the Van Cortlandt family cemetery, high on the nearby bluffs. "Certain lands" around the house were then filled in for the purpose of creating a "Colonial Garden," which was proposed in 1897. During excavation of the grounds, Indian artifacts and graves were found, corresponding to the old village of Keskeskick.

The nine-hole Van Cortlandt Golf Course opened on July 6, 1895, as the country's first and oldest public golf course. The 2,561-yard (2,342 m) course comprised current holes 1, 2, 3, 6, 7, 12, 13, and 14. The first eight holes were easier and less than 200 yards (180 m) apart, but the last one had a fairway 700 yards (640 m) in length. The ninth hole, which spanned two stone walls and two small brooks, was among the country's hardest holes. Four years after the course opened, the city hired Tom Bendelow, nicknamed the "Johnny Appleseed of Golf", to expand it to 18 holes. The course added a clubhouse in 1902, which also doubled as an ice-skating house.

At first, the park was sparsely used for sports. In 1899, there were 10, 7, and 5 permits issued for lawn tennis, baseball, and football, respectively. The Parade Ground was converted to recreational use starting in 1902, when the National Guard added fields for polo. In 1907, due to overcrowding, Dr. William Hornaday transferred 15 of the Bronx Zoo's then-rare bison to the Parade Ground, where they stayed until they were shipped to prairie land in Oklahoma later that year.

The Colonial Garden, designed by landscape architect Samuel Parsons, started construction in 1902 and opened the following June. Besides plants, the garden had rustic wooden bridges and wooden stairs and a "handsome fountain and central court." A "Shakespeare Garden" was also opened that year, with a grand stairway leading down to it. The next year, park officials realized that the Colonial Garden's construction was of poor quality and hard to cultivate. The garden had to be raised 3.5 feet (1.1 m), and a nursery needed to be built to transport the plants during the garden's reconstruction. The rustic wooden bridges were to be replaced with stone bridges, while the wooden stairs were to be superseded by stone stairs. Not only did many plants die during the process, but the actual rebuilding was delayed until 1911. Two years later, the Parks Commissioner for the Bronx refused to allocate reconstruction funds because, he stated, the garden looked just fine. Under threat of tearing the garden down, the city had to find money to fill and drain the ground. The rebuilding contract was awarded in 1909 and completed by 1911.

=== Early years ===
Various adjustments were made over succeeding years. A network of roads through the park was built soon after, allowing the construction of picnic areas and hiking trails as well as making the forests more accessible to visitors. A stone memorial was placed at Indian Field in 1906, with a plaque misspelling the name of the Indian chief, Abraham Ninham, as "Abraham Nimham." One particular concern was the threat of the wetlands serving as breeding grounds for malaria-bearing mosquitoes, which had drawn the ire of local residents and property owners as they believed the wetlands to be "unsightly and unsanitary." The marshlands were filled in between 1906 and 1922. The marsh to the southwest of the Van Cortlandt Station was converted to a lake. An "outlet sewer" under Broadway was built in 1907. From 1903 to 1911, NYC Parks cleaned the 13-foot-deep (4.0 m) Van Cortlandt Lake, removed the original earthen dam, and emptied the lake in order to dredge the lake bed to a lower depth. A new dam was installed to reform the lake. The former marshland was filled in.

During a 1910s excavation for a sewer pipe, stones were unearthed that were suspected to be from the old van der Donck estate. During World War I, the Parade Ground was used to train soldiers. Eight tennis courts opened in 1914 with admission being $1 per person, and owing to the Van Cortlandt Golf Course's immense popularity, the Mosholu Links also opened that year. By 1917, the Parade Ground contained 10 out of the park's baseball diamonds. The park's recreational facilities were quite popular, with more than 10,000 people using them on a busy day. However, during and following World War I, the Parade Ground was used for war training. Until 1926, the baseball fields did not contain backstops, and had to be vacated by July 4 of every year, so the National Guard could use the field.

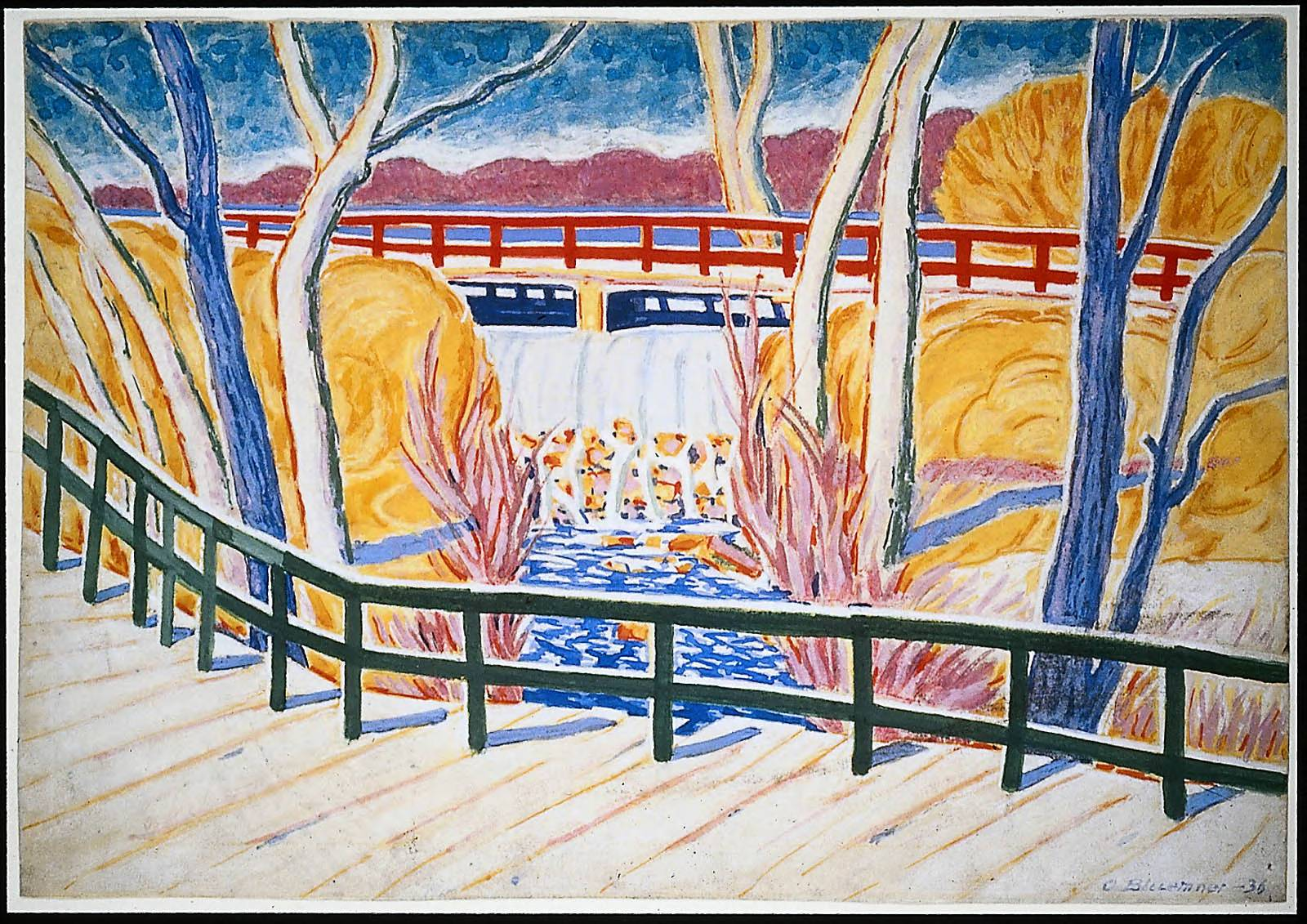
Van Cortlandt Park, Oscar Florianus Bluemner, 1936

The 6.2-mile (10.0 km) cross-country running course was inaugurated in 1914. The track started out as a flat path, became hilly, turned onto a "little spell of road work," went into the forest, and crossed a water before turning back. A year later, it hosted the Metropolitan Association of the Amateur Athletic Union's Junior and Senior Cross Country championships. A modified 3.1-mile (5.0 km) cross-country course opened on November 5, 1921, with runners simply changing direction at the city border. The new course, which started at the original polo fields, did not conflict with either of the golf courses.

In 1922, there was a proposal to acquire land for the future Saw Mill River Parkway, which would connect the park to 424 acres (172 ha) of open space in Westchester when completed. Through the 1930s, the New York City Department of Parks and Recreation kept adding new recreational facilities in the park. The Colonial and Shakespeare Gardens had a combined 250,000 flowers by 1931, but both were demolished by the end of the decade due to bad drainage.

In 1934, Robert Moses became the New York City Parks Commissioner, and during his 16-year tenure as commissioner, altered almost every aspect of the park. His job partially entailed balancing the needs of area residents, whose numbers had grown in the past decade, with transit users who traveled to the park from the north and south. Moses's development plans in the 1930s called for the construction of the Henry Hudson Parkway and Mosholu Parkway to bisect Van Cortlandt Park and meet at a trumpet interchange about half a mile north of the center, merging into the Saw Mill River Parkway. Due to objections over the construction of roads inside the park, the width of the parkways' lanes was reduced. Tibbetts Brook was dredged and landscaped in 1938 to accommodate construction. Such construction continued until 1955, during which the Major Deegan Expressway (current Interstate 87) was also built, bisecting the Mosholu Parkway. This conflicted with Moses's plans for the park as a "rural oasis", as highway construction ultimately separated the park into six pieces and demolished most of the remaining marsh in the park. This construction also induced siltation of the brook, leading to further creation of marshes.

Moses also made improvements to the park itself, building new walkways, paving dirt roads, creating playgrounds, and installing lights. Baseball, soccer, and cricket fields were added in 1938. The Van Cortlandt Stadium was added in 1939 on the site of a former swamp, and a pool followed in 1970. Moses also landscaped the areas near the Woodlawn and 242nd Street subway stations to attract park visitors from other neighborhoods. During his tenure as Parks Commissioner, Moses took aggressive approach to preserving the park's quality. For instance, six mothers were issued court summonses in 1942 after letting their children dig in the park, and two airplane pilots were fined in 1947 for unauthorized airplane landings.

Around 1939, the old aqueduct, which was now a popular hiking trail, started becoming a popular route with cyclists. Soon after, there was a proposal to redevelop the trail as a bike path. This proposal never came to fruition, although in the mid-1970s, the city built a separate bike path along Mosholu Parkway, the Bronx River Parkway, and Pelham Parkway between Jerome Avenue and Pelham Bay Park.

=== Decline ===
By the 1960s, large portions of the park, such as Tibbetts Brook, were being polluted by human activity; in addition, the brook now flowed into the Broadway sewer at the south end of Van Cortlandt Lake. Pollution from upstream and the highways, and spillover of chemicals used in the golf course, killed fish in the lake. This problem was first noticed in May 1961 when thousands of dead bass, pickerel, catfish, perch, and carp floated up at the edge of the lake. The mass-death of fish was blamed on siltation, Three years later, fish were still being killed by siltation. City investigators took water samples from the lake and found that they contained large amounts of weeds and sediment. About 22,000 square feet (2,000 m^{2}) of the lake's surface area was being lost to sedimentation every year. In addition, an algal bloom caused the lake to be in a low-oxygen condition, endangering plants and animals in and around the lake. "Unpleasant odors" in the summer also reduced recreational opportunities on the lake, and these conditions combined made it virtually impossible to come into contact with the lake's water without getting sick. By 1976, there was a moratorium on all boating activities on the lake.

The Van Cortlandt Golf Course was used as a ski slope during the winters starting in 1961, and up to 3,000 visitors would use the slopes each weekend. By 1964, with the use of artificial snow, it was also possible to ski during warmer days. The seasonal ski slope was closed in the late 1960s when the city decided to allow golfers to use the Van Cortlandt Course during winters. Also in the late 1960s, the city decided to build a series of public pools on the site of the Colonial Garden, consisting of a diving, a swimming, and a wading pool. Construction on the $1.5 million pools started in early 1969 and was completed by 1970. Because of the swampy nature of the ground underneath it, the pools soon began to crackle and set. By 1979, the locker rooms were heavily vandalized and the diving pool had been closed.

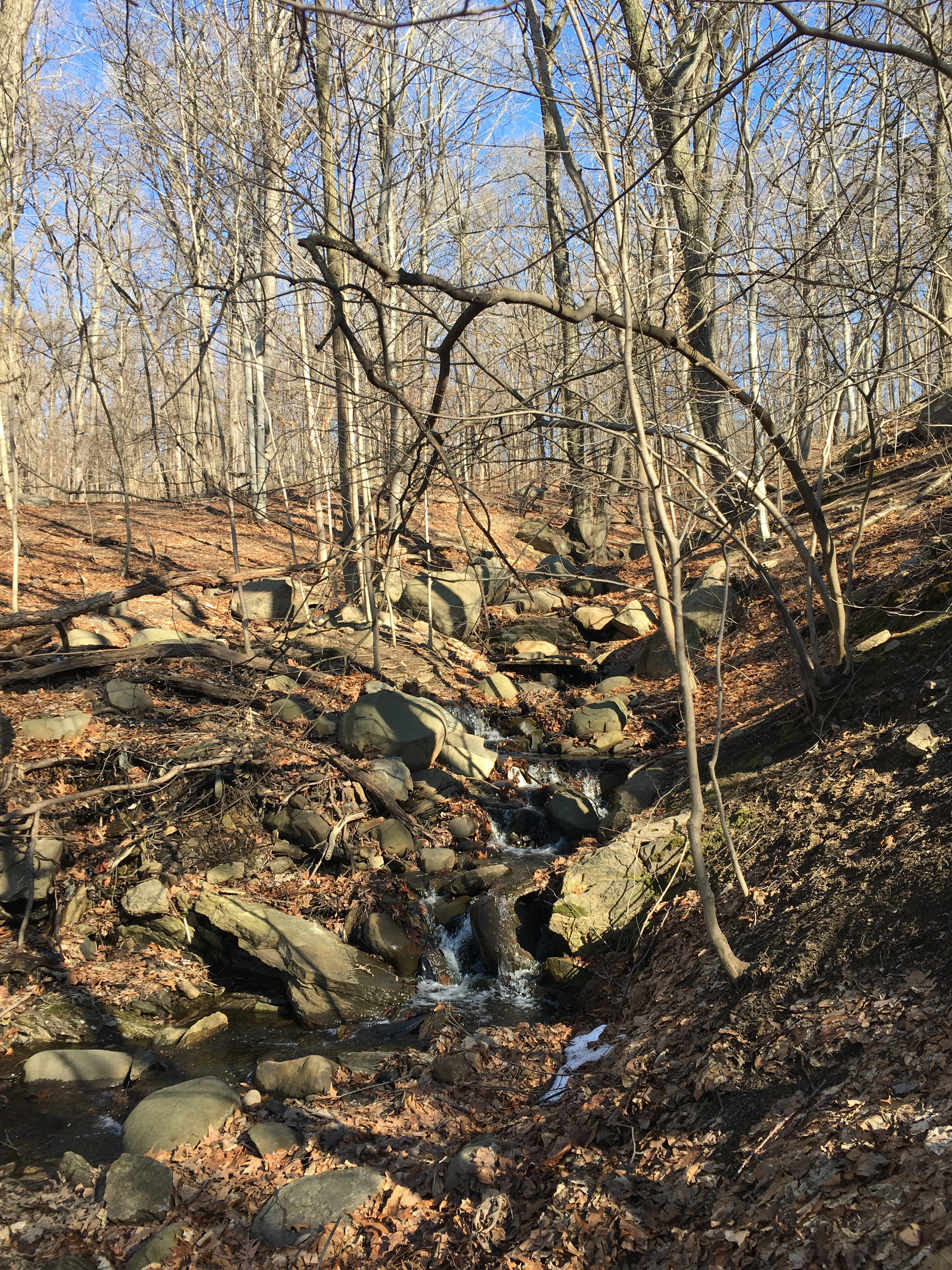
Rocky terrain in the park

The city's fiscal crisis in the 1970s caused the rest of the park to fall into disrepair. A dearth of funds exacerbated the pollution of the park. Hands-on education programs at the park were reduced to passive observations of flora and fauna. Elsewhere in the park, excessive foot traffic was eroding the soil in the forests. The stock of younger, replacement trees in the old-growth forest had relatively little diversity compared to other natural forests.

In 1979, New York City Councilwoman June Eisland released a report on Van Cortlandt Park. The report noted that pollutants from the Major Deegan Expressway were entering Van Cortlandt Lake, and that the park ecosystem was also being harmed by inadequate drainage, soil sterilants that were used on the Putnam Branch tracks, and a fungicide with 8.5% cadmium content that was being sprayed on the golf course. A year later, a private landscaping firm estimated that it would cost $4–7 million to restore the Van Cortlandt Lake. By this point, the lake was so dirty that a small boat could not float on it, even though the lake was 15 feet (4.6 m) deep. Catfish were the only fish that could survive in the lake water. The city of Yonkers eventually attributed the cause of the Van Cortlandt Lake's pollution to four storm sewers that were found to be illegally connected to Tibbetts Brook upstream.

The utter disrepair in the park prompted some informal rules at the park's golf courses. For instance, the Los Angeles Times noted that "a player was allowed to drop his ball a club length away if it rolled up against an abandoned auto, or, in one case, a boat. To thwart robbers, besieged golfers quit playing in traditional foursomes and instead ventured forth in football-team-sized units. Some players added an extra club—a night stick—or tucked tear gas spray into their golf bags." Years later, one writer recalled that dozens of the course's trees died, and "flagsticks were reduced to broken bamboo poles stuck into the ground." Weeds overgrew the course, and golfers would wear long-sleeved shirts to ward off against the city's insufficient mosquito repellents. Homeless squatters moved into the park, while courses fell into disrepair, replaced by dirt tracks and "huts and forts" built by neighborhood kids. In 1985, the city licensed control of the courses to Los Angeles-based American Golf Corporation for 60 years, leading to their restoration.

Other parts of the park also fell into disrepair, such as Vault Hill, whose headstones and crypts were vandalized in the 1960s. As early as 1962, a New York Times reader wrote of vandalism on Vault Hill. A lack of annual maintenance of the park's jogging tracks and bridle paths had caused them to erode and become overgrown at some places. The Parade Ground remained popular, and the New York Philharmonic and Metropolitan Opera performed in the field during the summer. It too had deteriorated because of intensive use: the grounds' topsoil had eroded away and the sidewalks started to buckle.

=== Improvements ===
==== 1970s to 1990s ====
In 1978–1979, NYC Parks performed a wholesale renovation of the park's eroded and dilapidated bridle paths and jogging tracks. Around that time, the Perrier Company donated a fitness trail consisting of 12 exercise machines to the park; there were originally supposed to be 18 machines, but the extra six machines were deemed unnecessary. Two shuffleboard courts were also installed in the Parade Grounds the same year, but went unused because of a lack of playing equipment.

In response to studies and accounts that showed the bad condition of the lake, the state restored the fish population of the lake in 1978. In 1977, the Bronx Borough Board created a special committee to oversee and develop plans for improving Van Cortlandt Park. The Friends of Van Cortlandt Park soon came up with its own suggestions to improve the park. After the parcourse for the parade grounds was approved in 1978, the New York City Department of Parks promised to cooperate on the Van Cortlandt Park improvement plans. The 1979 Eisland plan also detailed suggestions for park improvements. This culminated in the 1980 appointment of a park coordinator who would start devising details of a "master plan" for the park.

In 1985, a study recommended ecological restoration of the lake and forest, which had been overtaken by invasive species introduced during highway construction. Since then, there have been seven plans for restoring natural elements of the park, as well as three plans for park restoration. Gradual improvements began taking place in the late 1980s, including the addition of new pathways, signage, and security, as well as the restoration of playgrounds and other recreational facilities. In January 1988, NYC Parks conducted a study to determine the specific elements of the park that needed restoration. Highway structures were also reconfigured to clean runoff from these structures. An excavation in the 1990s yielded over 2,500 artifacts. A set of tennis courts were proposed within the park east of the Van Cortlandt House in the 1990s; despite concerns from preservationists, though the courts were approved.

==== 2000s to present ====
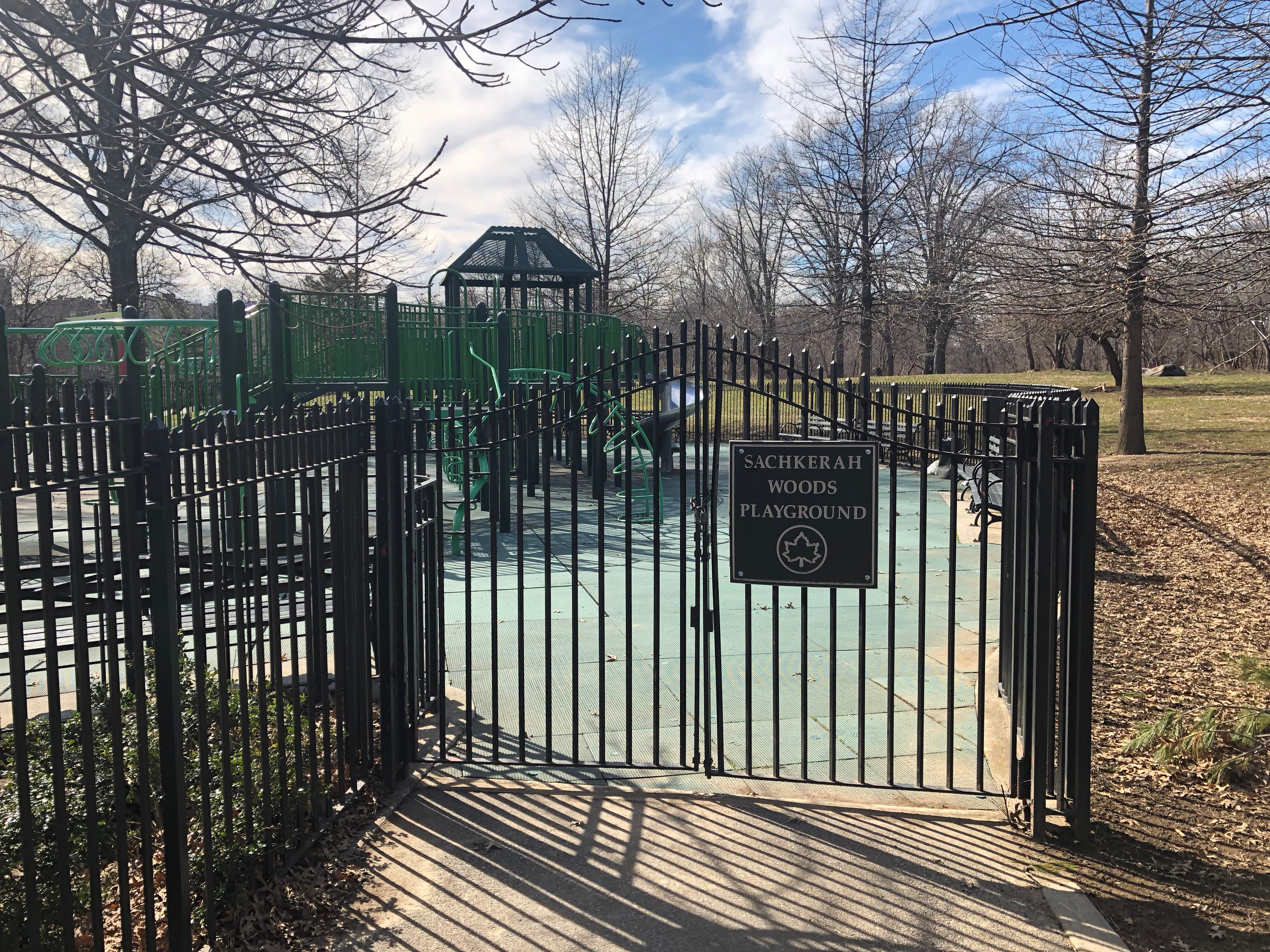
The Sachkerah Woods Playground, located at Van Cortlandt Park's southeast corner

The city built the Croton Water Filtration Plant, a drinking water treatment facility, under the park's Mosholu Golf Course. The plant was needed to filter contaminants from urban runoff pollution in the Croton River watershed and protect the public from Giardia and Cryptosporidium, microorganisms which can cause serious health problems. The Croton plant was built after a lawsuit was filed in 1997 against the city by the U.S. Environmental Protection Agency (EPA), the U.S. Department of Justice and the State of New York. The city settled the suit and a consent decree was issued with the condition that the city would build the plant by 2006. The project experienced delays and ballooning costs due to objections from the local community, which required the city to propose alternate sites for the plant. The plant was built 160 feet (49 m) below the Mosholu Golf Course, at a cost of $3.2 billion, and was finished in 2015.

To lessen the disruption caused by the plant's construction, in 2010 the city used mitigation funds from the construction budget to restore the Van Cortlandt Park Parade Ground. The Sachkerah Woods Playground, located at the park's southeast corner near the Mosholu Golf Course, was also built using Croton mitigation funds.

As part of the "Van Cortlandt Park Master Plan 2034", critical ecological elements of the park, such as the forest, the rural landscape, and Tibbetts Brook, would be restored, and the brook would be diverted. As of March 2014 when the report was written, the lack of natural drainage points within Van Cortlandt Park led to the flooding of recreational areas within the park during heavy rains. The park's paths would also be restored with the addition of three new pedestrian bridges; a playground; four activity centers, of which two would be outdoors and two would be indoors; a skate park; an athletic field; and three basketball courts built within the park. "Comfort stations" and food concessions would also be added. The Van Cortlandt Golf Course was renovated in 2016. The skate park, new playground, and path improvements were completed in 2020. NYC Parks started renovating the Woodlawn Playground in 2021 for $1 million. One of the pedestrian bridges, which would have crossed the Major Deegan Expressway, was postponed in 2020 after its cost had increased to $23 million; the bridge was canceled in 2023.

== Geography ==
At 1,146 acres (464 ha), Van Cortlandt Park is the third-largest park in New York City, behind the Staten Island Greenbelt (1,778 acres (720 ha)) and Pelham Bay Park (2,772 acres (1,122 ha)). It has numerous attractions and features that are both recreational and educational.

=== Geology ===
The different parts of Van Cortlandt Park have a varied geology. The Northwest Woods and Old Croton Aqueduct Trailway have a steep terrain dotted with Fordham gneiss, a metamorphic rock that is very hard to weather. The Tibbetts Brook valley is set in Inwood marble, which weathers more easily. The east side of the park near Indian Field contains Yonkers granite, an igneous rock that mixed with Fordham gneiss as a hot magma before later cooling.

=== Watercourses ===
Van Cortlandt Park contains the Bronx's largest freshwater lake, the eponymous Van Cortlandt Lake. The lake is 4 to 8 feet (1.2 to 2.4 m) deep at various times of year, and has an area of 18 acres (7.3 ha). The lake is used for recreational fishing, as it includes species such as largemouth bass, black crappie, brown bullhead, bluegill, pumpkinseed, golden shiner, common carp, white sucker, and yellow perch. It is fed by Tibbetts Brook, a stream originating in Yonkers, which runs through a series of culverts before draining into the south edge of the lake at approximately West 242nd Street. There are efforts to daylight this south end into the former New York and Putnam Railroad right-of-way that runs through the park as part of the park's faster plan.

There is no surviving documentation for the creation of Van Cortlandt Lake. In 1699, Jacobus Van Cortlandt dammed Tibbetts Brook to power a sawmill, creating a mill pond at the site where the lake is. Later, he also added a gristmill. The sawmill was relocated around 1823 and stayed in operation until 1889. The gristmill was destroyed by lightning in 1901.

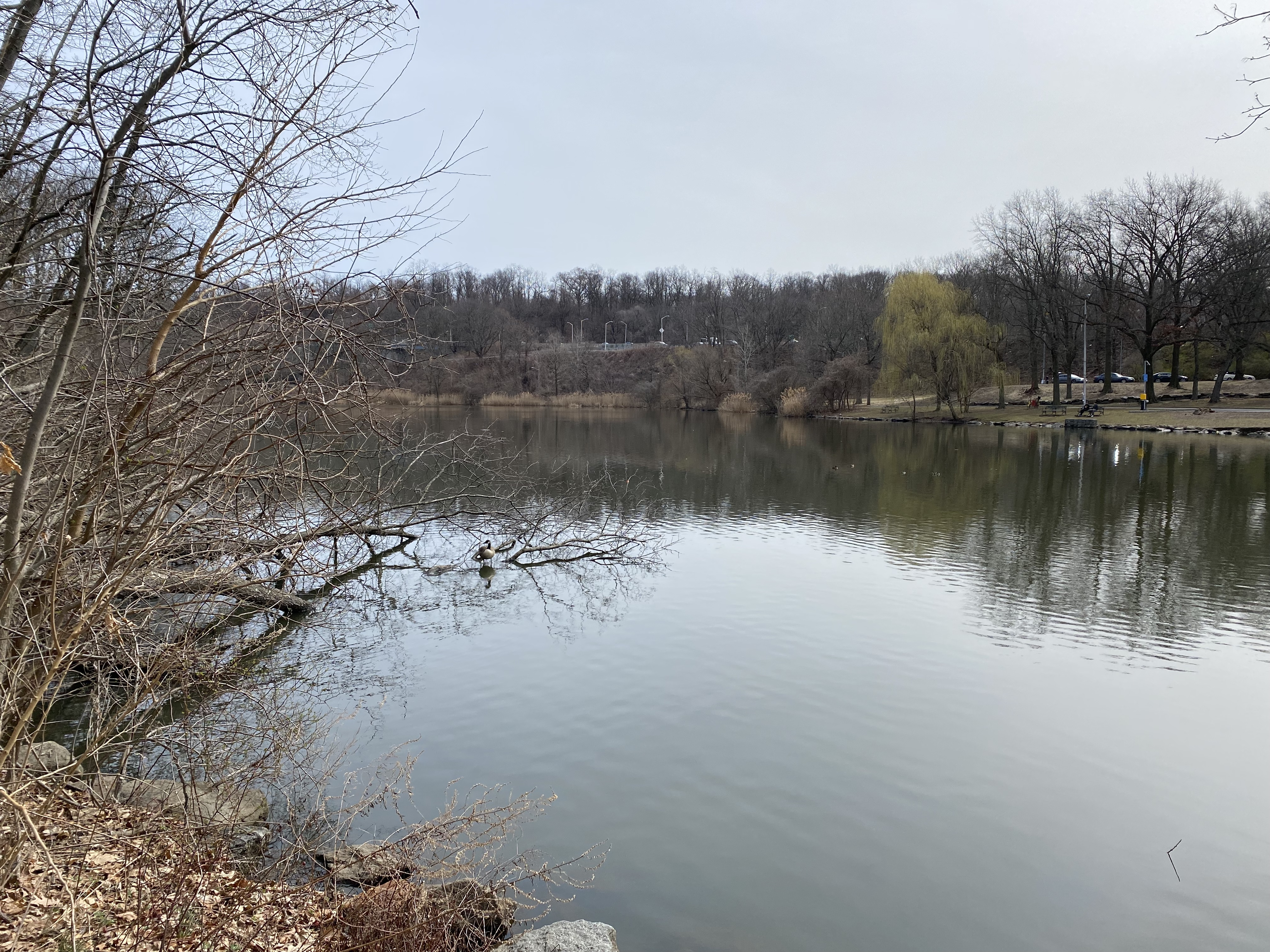
Van Cortlandt Lake from the western shore

By the time the park was created, Van Cortlandt Lake needed to be cleaned, as cesspools in Yonkers had leaked sewage into Tibbetts Brook, which fed into the lake. A 1903 annual report from the New York City Department of Parks and Recreation mentioned that the lake had probably not been cleaned since the mid-18th century, and now contained a layer of "refuse and vegetation on top, and an ooze two to three feet deep on the bottom," with qualities more like a "semi-bog." Cleaning of the lake started in 1903. The lake's original earthen dam was removed, the lake was emptied, and 30,000 cubic yards (23,000 m^{3}) of deposits were dredged from the lake bed. A new 2,270-foot (690 m) retaining wall was then erected along the lake's eastern shore, and a new dam was installed to reform the lake and to allow future cleaning of the lake without having to dredge it. After the opening of an overflow drain in 1911–1912, which connected to the sewer under Broadway completed in 1907, Tibbetts Brook was directed into the new sewer, The construction of the Van Cortlandt Golf Course compounded the lake's dirty condition, and by 1912, the lake and brook contained significant sedimentation.

Nearby residents also disliked the wetlands near the lake, as they could be used to breed malaria-bearing mosquitoes, and were thus seen as "unsightly and unsanitary." In 1896, they proposed to fill the wetlands in, and the infill proposal was funded by the New York City Board of Estimate in 1899. Subsequently, the Parks Department proposed to dredge the swamp and create a lake in its stead, but despite this plan receiving $70,000 in funding in 1906, it was deemed "not feasible" to drain the swamp directly into the Broadway sewer. Another plan to remove the swamps in the park's southwest was approved in 1904. The plan was to build an athletic field in the southwest swamp's place, but all swamp-infill proposals for this sector were rejected in 1917. By 1922, there were 23 acres (9.3 ha) of swampland left in the park, and the Parks Department hoped to convert parts of it for some athletic purpose, but this required the New York Central Railroad to raise one of its bridges first so the swampland could be accessed. However, there are no records of that bridge being raised or of the swamp being converted.

In its early years, the lake was used for boating, canoeing, curling, and ice skating. By 1899, the lake was used by up to 3,000 skaters on weekdays and 10,000 on weekends. The ice-skating house, shared with the golf course, was added in 1902. By 1935, the lake was used by approximately 20,000 skaters daily.

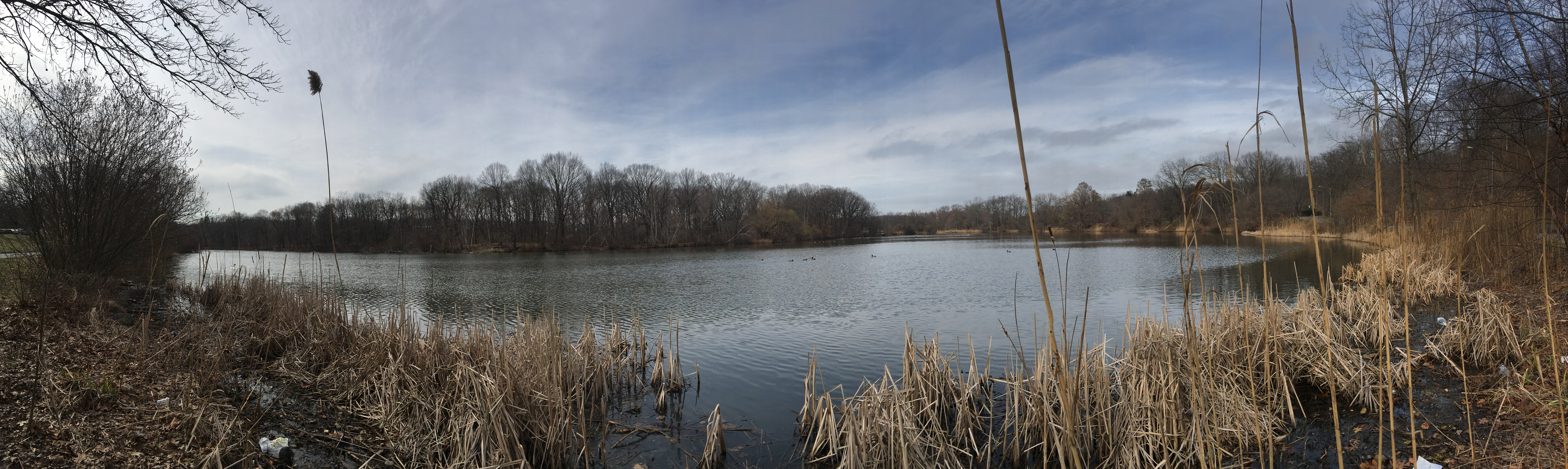
Panorama of Van Cortlandt Lake from the east shore

== Wildlife ==
There are several old-growth forests with tree species and genera such as black oak, hickory, beech, cherry birch, sweetgum, red maple, and tuliptree. The forests also contain wild turkeys, red-tailed hawks, great horned owls,s barred owls, bats, Eastern chipmunks, Eastern gray squirrels, groundhogs, gypsy moths, Eastern cottontail rabbits, striped skunks, North American raccoons, Virginia opossums, white-tailed deer and Eastern coyotes. In addition, over 130 species of butterflies can be found in the park. In 1937, it was noted that the marshlands had fauna such as red-winged blackbirds, yellowthroats, green bottle flies, beetles, dragonflies, tadpoles, great blue herons, green herons, kingfishers, and ospreys. Its flora included cattail, skunk cabbage, and moss. Its avian population during the winters has exceeded that of either Central or Prospect Parks; a total of 301 bird species have been seen in the park since 1875, when records were first kept. Amphibians present include American bullfrogs, red-backed salamanders, and spring peepers. Also present in and around the park's waterways and wetlands are common snapping turtles and Eastern painted turtles, as well as red-eared sliders that were introduced to the region.

== Landmarks and structures ==
=== Trails ===
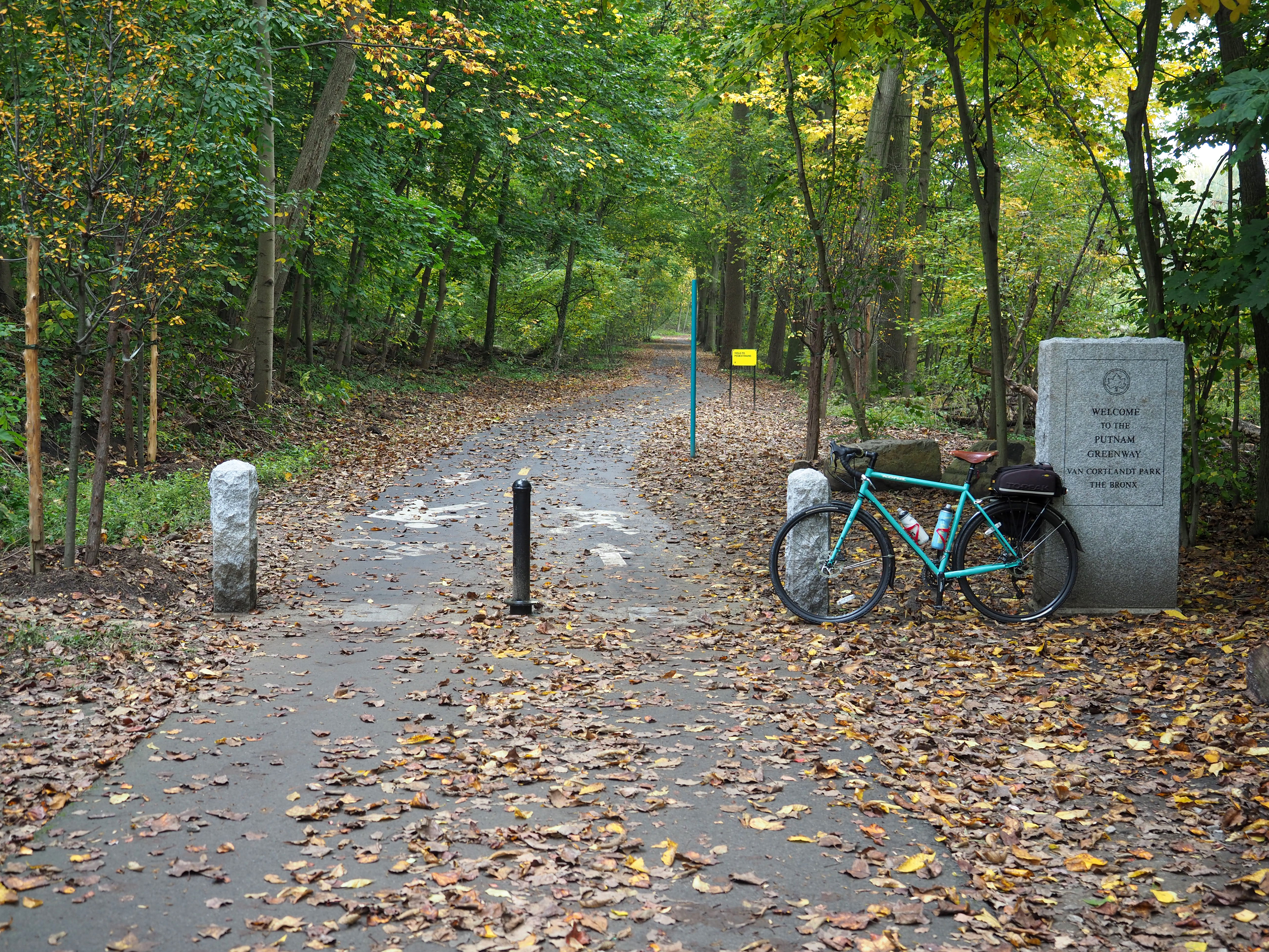
Putnam Trail entrance, looking south from the city line.

There are five major hiking trails in the park. The Putnam Trail (1.5 miles (2.4 km), easy), runs north through the woods to the east of this lawn and west of Van Cortlandt Lake, through the golf course and along Tibbetts Brook and the former New York and Putnam Railroad line into Yonkers, where it connects to Westchester County's paved South County Trailway. Previously unpaved, the Putnam Trail underwent a reconstruction project starting in August 2019 and was reopened in October 2020 as a paved pedestrian and bicycle path.

The rails themselves were overrun with weeds, but they were no longer usable by trains. The remains of the former Van Cortlandt Park station can be seen along the trail. As part of the park's 2034 master plan, NYC Parks undertook a project to pave the entirety of the trail through Van Cortlandt Park as well as a short extension to the south, making it usable for both pedestrians and bicyclists. A construction contract for the paving project was awarded in October 2018 to Grace Industries, and it was completed in October 2020.

The Old Croton Aqueduct Trailway (1.1 miles (1.8 km), easy/moderate), was created in 1968 when the New York State Office of Parks, Recreation and Historic Preservation had bought a 26.2-mile (42.2 km) stretch of the Old Croton Aqueduct, for use as a walking trail. It starts in Van Cortlandt Park as a grass-and-dirt trail and runs north along the route of the old aqueduct. The trail features vestiges of an old, disused brick tunnel that brought water to Manhattan, as well as a gatehouse for the aqueduct. Within the park, the Old Croton Aqueduct trail borders Mosholu Golf Center and Driving Range, as well as the Allen Shandler Recreation Area. Its southern end is cut off by the Major Deegan Expressway in the southwestern end of the park. As part of the Croton Water Filtration Plant project, the New York City Department of Environmental Protection was given $200 million to mitigate the effects of constructing the plant. A feasibility study in 2009 found that a bridge near the location of 233rd Street was the most feasible, and would connect the two sections of the trail. This bridge was deferred over lack of funding in 2014 before planning resumed in 2015.

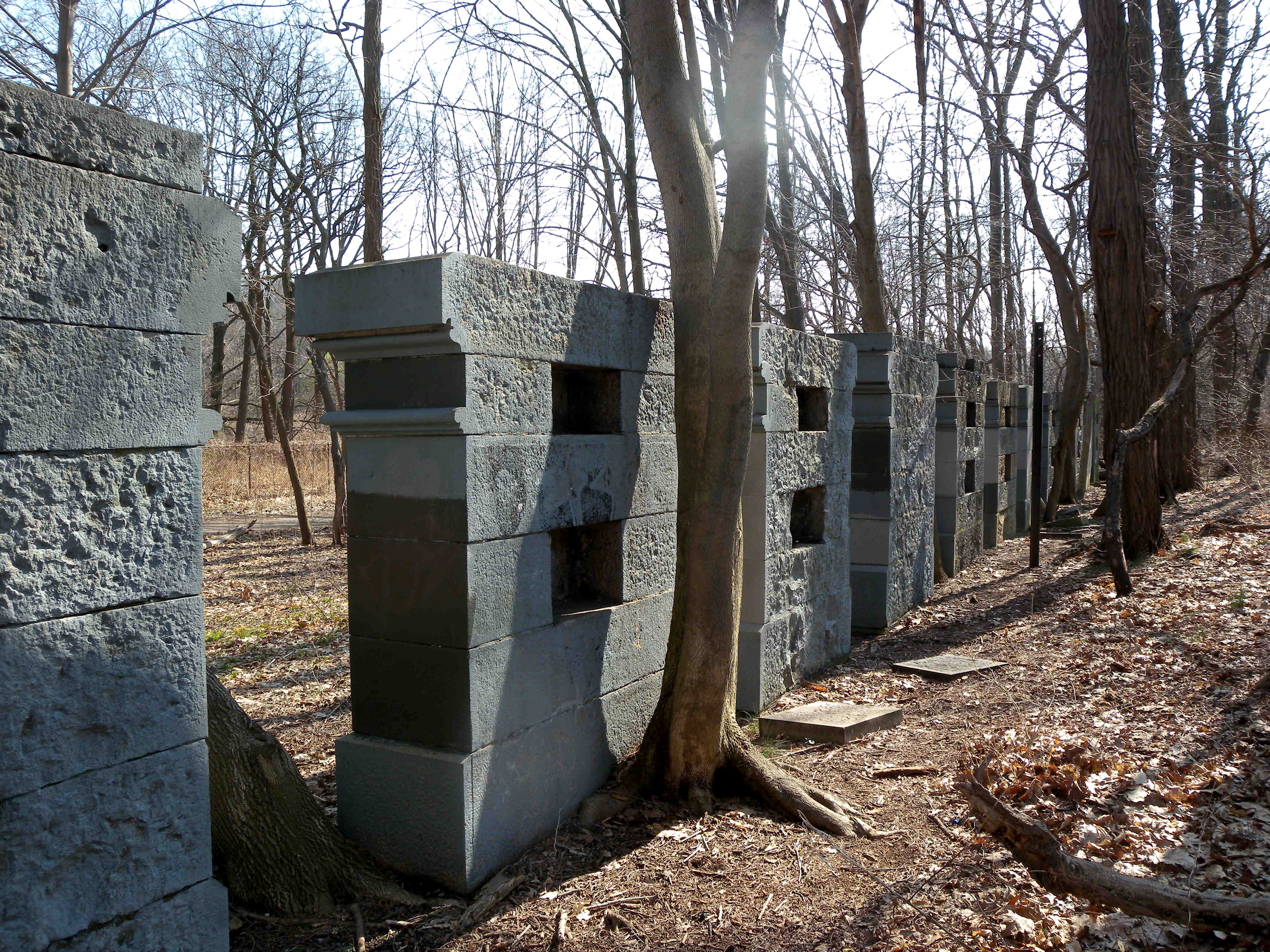
A former structural stone testing site for the construction of Grand Central Terminal

The John Kieran Nature Trail (1.25 miles (2.01 km), easy), which connects to the Putnam Trail, opened in 1987 and is named after local writer and naturalist John Kieran. The path features 13 stone pillars, each made of a different variety of stone, that were tested for the facade of Grand Central Terminal during the terminal's construction. The variety eventually chosen was Indiana limestone because it was cheap. The trail hugs the edge of the Van Cortlandt Lake and Tibbetts Brook marsh.

The John Muir Trail (1.5 miles (2.4 km), moderate) is the park's only east–west trail that connects the three northern forested areas. It was established in 1997. Various species of trees and flowering plants can be seen along the trail, such as northern red oak, sweetgum, and tulips. There is a large, steep hill in the center of the trail.

The Cass Gallagher Nature Trail (1.4 miles (2.3 km), moderate/difficult) is the hardest trail in the park. It was given its current name in 1984, named after a local resident who was a fervent advocate of preserving the park's environment. Shaped as a loop, it extends through the rocky forests of the park's northwestern portion. It was once a "self-guided interpretive nature trail" where hikers could observe natural elements along the trail. Along this trail, there is a "thick undergrowth" beneath a "canopy" of deciduous trees that date back centuries. However, logging and forest fires have killed some of these trees. Pioneer species, which inhabit the plots of the forest destroyed by logging and fire, include sumac and black locusts. There is also an outcropping of Fordham gneiss, the last vestige of a giant mountain chain that used to run through this area until the Wisconsin glaciation. The exposed rocks also contain mica and quartz. There have been many sightings of bird species along this trail, such as those of woodpeckers, owls, quail and pheasants. This trail repeatedly crosses a 3-mile (4.8 km) cross-country trail.

A bikeway runs east from the golf course's clubhouse to connect to the Mosholu Parkway bike path. Some trail sections are a part of the East Coast Greenway, a 3,000-mile-long (4,800 km) trail system connecting Maine to Florida. The proposed Harlem River Greenway, which started construction in 2025, would connect Van Cortlandt Park with Randalls Island to the south.

=== Landmarks ===
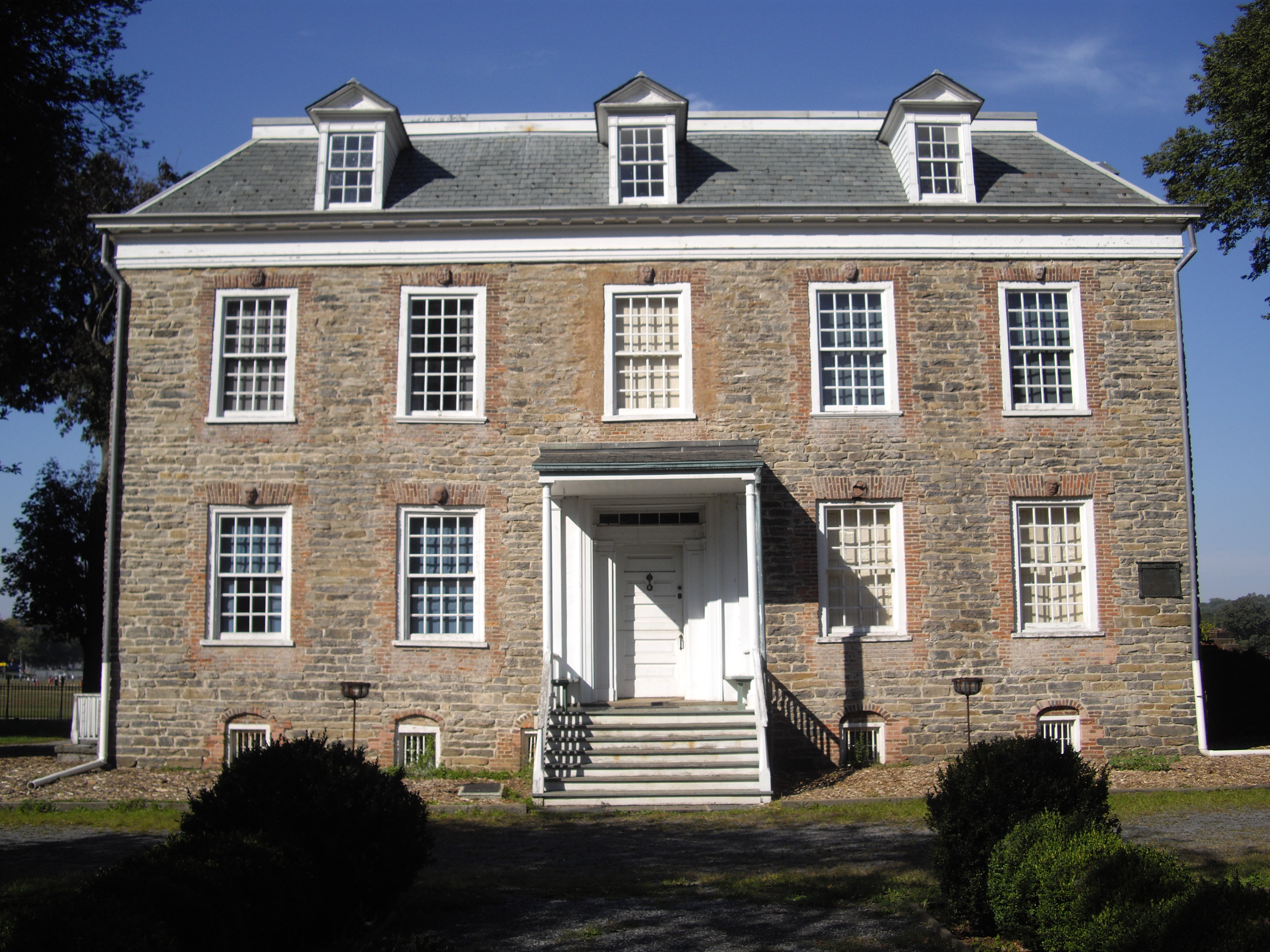
The historic Van Cortlandt House, now a museum

The Van Cortlandt House in the southern part of Van Cortlandt Park was erected by Frederick Van Cortlandt in 1748. This house still stands, making it the oldest known surviving house in the Bronx. The estate the house sits on was of major importance during the American Revolution. Troops from both the British and Colonial American armies rested in this house during the time of war. The Van Cortlandt family owned the property until they decided to sell both the house and land to the City of New York in 1886. Ten years later, the house was restored as a museum displaying the culture and lifestyle of 18th-century families. It was added to the National Register of Historic Places in 1967 and became a National Historic Landmark in 1976.

East of the Van Cortlandt House is the Sugar House Prison Window Monument–a section of the wall from one of the notorious Manhattan sugar house prisons used to hold American soldiers during the Revolutionary War. It features a window and Dutch bricks salvaged from the Duane Street (Rhinelander) Sugar House when it was demolished in 1892 and set up in the park as a memorial to Patriot prisoners.

Near the museum is a 15-mile marker for the old Albany Post Road, which was relocated to its current position in 1934 after the road was rerouted. In 1938, officials at San Francisco's Golden Gate International Exposition gave a 4.5-foot (1.4 m) walnut tree to the City of New York, who then planted the tree outside the museum in the place of another tree that had died.

Vault Hill, the family burial ground, still exists. Located 169 feet (52 m) above sea level, it is northeast of the Parade Ground and west of Tibbetts Brook and the Van Cortlandt Golf Course. There may have been an unmarked graveyard for Native Americans and African slaves, which was likely destroyed when the New York and Putnam Railroad line was built. Another graveyard exists for the Berrian family, who lived nearby during the 18th century and were related by marriage to the Tippetts.

The Memorial Grove honors Bronxites who served in World War II and the Korean War. It is located by the road to the Van Cortlandt House, close to Broadway. Created in 1949, the grove contained a tree and a bronze plaque for each of the 39 soldiers who were memorialized. By the time the grove was renovated in 2011, there were only 18 plaques left. Restoration was completed in 2012.

=== Other structures ===
Van Cortlandt Park contains Citywide Nursery, one of three greenhouses operated by NYC Parks. It grows about 200,000 plants each year.

== Recreation ==
The Parade Ground is north of the museum, in the western part of the park. When the park was originally built, there was a law dictating that the Parade Ground should be vacated for National Guard use if required. The field was originally used by the National Guard for brigade practice, but this use was decommissioned by the 1930s, and the land near Broadway was converted to 17 multipurpose baseball, football or soccer fields and two additional fields solely for cricket. Today, it contains 10 of the borough's 19 total cricket fields and a Gaelic football field. The cricket fields were renovated from 2010 to 2013 for $13 million. During the renovation, the fields were relocated such that they did not overlap with each other or with the soccer and baseball fields. The Parade Ground also has other areas dedicated to various sports, including six baseball fields, four football fields, five soccer fields, and a 1.5-mile (2.4 km) course for cross-country running. The Rolling Stones commenced their Licks Tour here in 2002, getting into a blimp from the Parade Ground.

The park is home to a free public pool, along with numerous playgrounds for children and areas dedicated for barbecuing. The pool was added in 1970, though proposals for such a pool date back to 1907. It was designed by Heery & Heery architects and cost $1.6 million. The pool contains a 17,280-US-gallon (65,400 L; 14,390 imp gal) wading pool, a diving pool, and a 380,000-US-gallon (1,400,000 L; 320,000 imp gal) Olympic-sized pool.

The Van Cortlandt Stadium was built by Parks Commissioner Moses and Mayor Fiorello H. La Guardia during the Great Depression, and was funded by Works Progress Administration. It is located north of Van Cortlandt Park South near Broadway in the park's southwest corner. The stadium opened on September 22, 1939, to a day of track events and a football game between Manhattan University and Fordham University. It had 18 tennis courts, five basketball courts, six handball courts, three baseball fields, three football fields (including one in the stadium itself), three horseshoe pitching fields, a running track, and a bowling green, as well as water fountains and lockers. In 1994, Mayor Giuliani funded a $415,000 project for concrete repairs to the stadium, and in 1998, the 0.25-mile (0.40 km) running track was rebuilt for nearly a million dollars. Except for 2015 to 2021, the park has been the home of the Manhattan University Jaspers college baseball team.

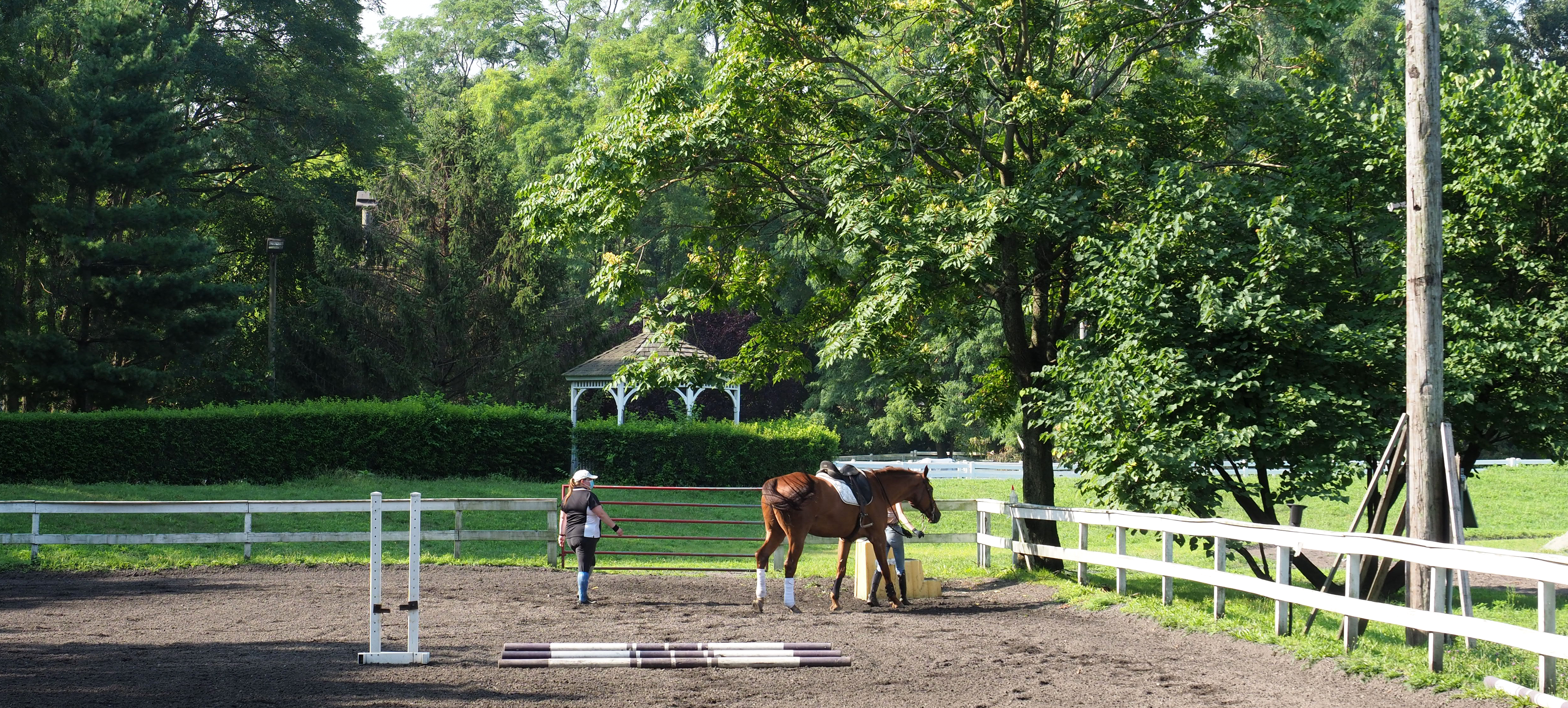
Riverdale Stables

Riverdale Stables, located on 21 acres (8.5 ha) of the park, offers horseback riding. In 1934, there were two stables: a larger one east of the Putnam Division near Van Cortlandt Avenue and 242nd Street, and a smaller one to the Van Cortlandt Course clubhouse's east.

The Indian Field has baseball and softball fields, a sandbox, picnic tables, tennis courts, horseshoes courts, and shuffleboard courts. The Allen Shandler Recreation Area, renamed from the Holly Park Recreation Area in 1966 after a neighborhood boy who was diagnosed with a brain tumor in the 1960s and died at age 15, has baseball fields, benches, picnic tables, barbecue grills, and a comfort station. Other activities available at the park include basketball, ice skating, and fishing.

=== Golf ===
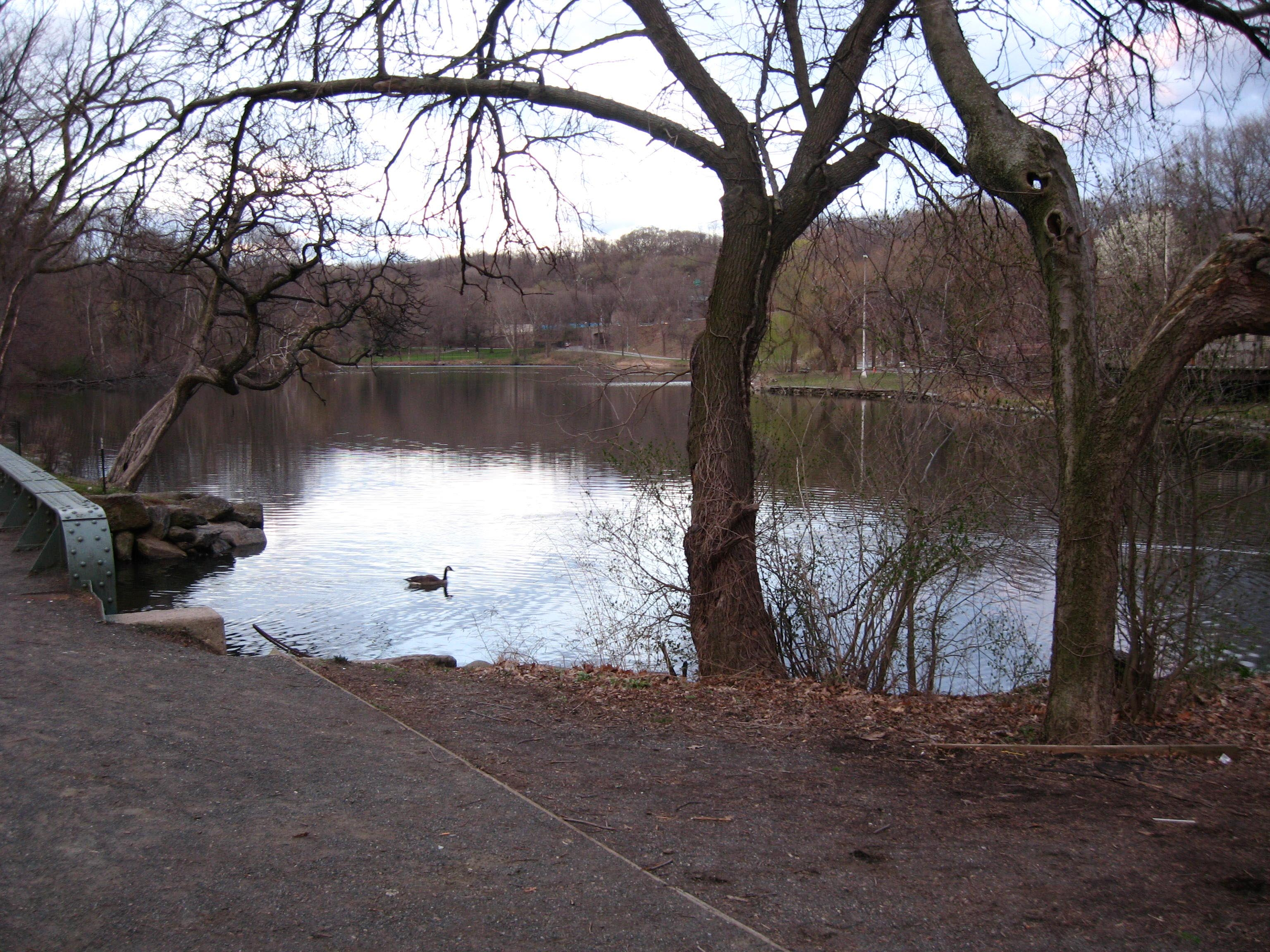
The lake and golf course at sunset; the former railroad bridge is at far left

The Van Cortlandt Golf Course, which opened on July 6, 1895, with nine holes, is located centrally on the park grounds. Within a year, the course became very crowded and disorganized, with crowds behaving poorly. Rules were set in 1896, with golfers paying caddies 15 cents per round or 25 cents per two rounds. Only caddies with badges could be hired, and bicycles, baby strollers, horse-riding, and horse-drawn carriages were banned from the course.

The course was upgraded to 18 holes in 1899, and the grounds gained a new clubhouse by 1902. The new Van Cortlandt Golf Course was supposed to be "experimental," and if the course was successful, similar courses would be laid around the country. Other American cities were interested in building such courses. The 1899 Bendelow reconstruction had rebuilt the course so that it now spanned 120 acres (49 ha), compared to the 55 acres (22 ha) of the previous course. The new course was now 6,060 yards (5,540 m) long, or about 3.44 miles (5.54 km). NYC Parks reconfigured the course again the following year so that "congestion would be prevented and accidents avoided." Boulders were relocated, greens were enlarged, and hazards were built in order to space out the holes. A clubhouse was added two years later. Plans to extend the clubhouse were rejected in 1917.

On July 13, 1905, Isaac Mackie won an Open Tournament at the Van Cortlandt Park course, shooting 152 and holding off joint second-place finishers Willie Anderson and Bernard Nicholls who finished at 157. It was the first ever professional tournament held on a public golf course in the United States.

In 1914, a second golf course, the Mosholu Golf Course, opened adjacent to the existing Van Cortlandt Park course. It is located at the southeast end of the park. By the 1930s, both courses were being intensively used, with restaurants located near both clubhouses. Around this time, six holes of the Van Cortlandt course were rebuilt as part of the Henry Hudson Parkway's construction. Due to the Major Deegan Expressway's construction in 1949, there were plans to fill in 7 acres (2.8 ha) of the nearby marshlands so new holes could be built. A third of the way into the filling-in project, conservationists and residents called for the rest of the marsh to be preserved. Two greens were eventually placed on the filled-in marshland.

In 2002, a First Tee course, for young golfers, opened at the Mosholu course. The Van Cortlandt Golf Course and its attached clubhouse were renovated from 2007 to 2014 for $5 million. Prior to the renovation, there was poor management, dirty grounds, and "a proliferation of prostitutes and drug dealers operating much too close for comfort plagued the grounds." The renovation overhauled the course with such improvements as seven new greens and a new drainage system. The clubhouse received an infusion of historic golf artifacts from NYC Parks, including "vintage photographs" and an exhibit about the history of the golf ball.

=== Running ===
Van Cortlandt Park is a popular site for cross-country running, owing to its miles of cinder trails and hills as well as its steep terrain. One legend has it that a cross-country coach thought that Van Cortlandt Park's tracks were too hard and instead went to the New Jersey Meadowlands to train. Its courses are some of the most utilized cross-country courses in the United States.

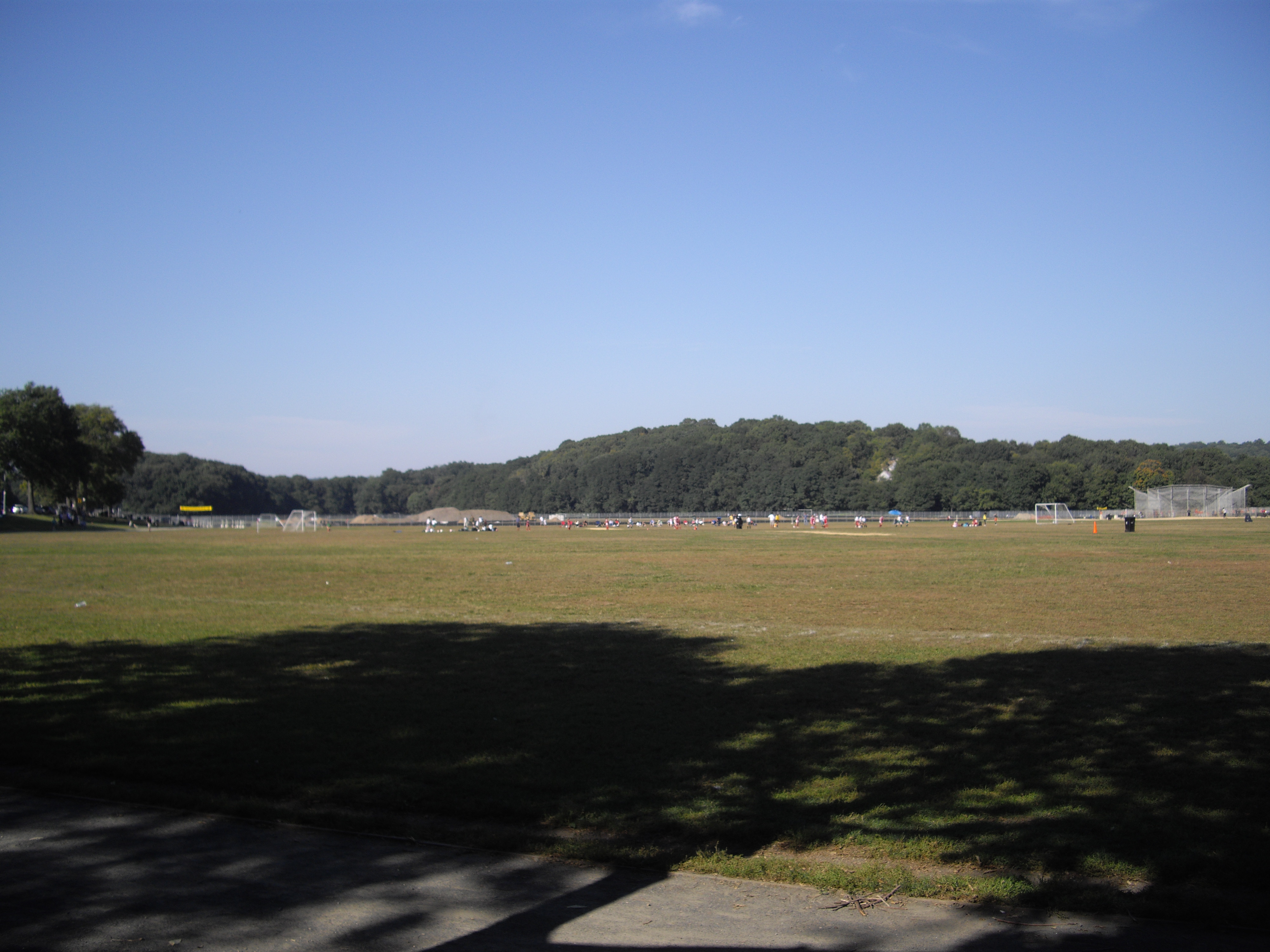
View of the Parade Ground from the starting line of the cross-country course

Around the Parade Ground, known to runners as "the flats," there is a track that circles for 1.5 miles (2.4 km). Another 1.25-mile (2.01 km) rubber trail and the 3.1-mile (5.0 km) cross-country trail supplement each other between 241st Street and the city border. Runners on the cross-country course typically run 6.2 miles (10.0 km). They start at the Parade Ground and passing through "the cowpath," "the runners' bridge," Cemetery Hill, and "the back hills," using the back hills to turn back at the city border. This trail, built in 1913 out of parts of existing trails, was renovated in 1997 for $2 million, receiving a new layer of asphalt and stone to cover a tangle of "muddy ruts and jutting roots and rocks" that were breaking runners' ankles. However, by 2013, the trail was starting to show signs of deterioration.

The park is used for the Northeast regional championships of the Foot Locker Cross-Country Championships. The cross-country trail is used for the Manhattan College Invitational, one of the largest high school cross-country meets in the nation. In 2006, the USA Cross-Country Championships were held at Van Cortlandt and organized by USATF and New York Road Runners. The Manhattan College Invitational is held at the park annually.

The tracks are used not only by local high schools, but also for many college races. It is the home course for Fordham University; Iona College; New York University; and Manhattan University, located across the street. The college course is five miles (8.0 km) long, crossing the Henry Hudson Parkway at one point. This course was renovated in 1997 for almost $1 million. The 1968 and 1969 NCAA Men's Division I Cross Country Championship was hosted by Manhattan University at the park. The events were attended by about 10,000 people, and the championship race was 6 miles (9.7 km) long. In addition, Van Cortlandt is the venue for the annual IC4A or Intercollegiate Association of Amateur Athletes of America (ICAAAA) cross country championships.

=== City's only Canadian football game ===
On December 11, 1909, the Hamilton Tigers and the Ottawa Rough Riders (later of the Canadian Football League), played an exhibition game at Van Cortlandt Park. Sponsored by the New York Herald, the game garnered between 5,000 and 30,000 spectators as Hamilton defeated Ottawa, 11–6. The Canadian Football League's influence in the U.S. did not change after the match, and no subsequent exhibition games were played in the city. However, it was notable for being the first elite Canadian football game to be played in the U.S.

== Management ==
Before 1992, there was no private maintenance of the park. The earliest efforts for such a thing date to 1983, when an administrator was appointed to oversee both Van Cortlandt and Pelham Bay Parks.

Though NYC Parks owns and operates the park, until 2019 maintenance was handled by two separate nonprofit organizations. Van Cortlandt Park Conservancy, a private nonprofit organization founded in 2009, managed educational and cultural programs, and maintains the recreational areas. The Friends of Van Cortlandt Park, an independent nonprofit established in 1992, provided educational programs and assists in the upkeep of the park's natural areas. However, the two organizations have not had the same amount of funding as similar private organizations who manage parks in wealthier areas of the city. In 2013, Friends of Van Cortlandt Park only raised $416,612—as opposed to the Central Park Conservancy, which in 2016 had an $81 million endowment to maintain Central Park, or the Four Freedoms Parks Conservancy, which raised $8 million in 2011 alone for the construction of the Four Freedoms Park. In 2019, it was announced that the two organizations would merge that June. The combined organization, the Van Cortlandt Park Alliance, would continue the programming and activities offered by the two organizations.

== Transportation ==
=== Roads ===
Map

Early in the park's history, there were calls for a direct route between Woodlawn and Riverdale. Property owners in Woodlawn were calling for such a route by 1893. A preliminary plan for the road was submitted to NYC Parks in 1894. The Woodland Path, built in the late 1890s, was linked in 1902 to a new 2,100-foot (640 m) path on the Van Cortlandt Golf Course's eastern perimeter that stretched east to Jerome Avenue. Another road was built in 1902, extending 5,960 feet (1,820 m) north from West Gun Hill Road to the city line on the park's north side (later Mosholu Avenue; now Mosholu Parkway). It was completed and planted with trees in 1905. A third, 1,800-foot-long (550 m) road linked Jerome Avenue and East 237th Street to give Woodlawn residents direct access to Jerome Avenue Line streetcars. There were also preparations for a fourth road, which would run north from Mosholu Avenue and then fork into two roads before entering Yonkers. This fourth road, a "driveway" called Rockwood Drive that ran from Mosholu Avenue to the city line at Yonkers, was completed in 1903. An additional spur from Rockwood Drive diverged from the intersection with Mosholu Avenue, terminating at the train station. A pedestrian passage from Jerome Avenue to Gun Hill Road, opened in 1905, also allowed more direct access into the park from Jerome Avenue. These roads allowed park visitors to access more of the park via automobile, but also had the effect of separating existing amenities, such as the golf course and Parade Ground, from each other.

By 1906, increased automotive traffic necessitated the widening of Grand Avenue, which adjoined the golf course. A year later in 1907, NYC Parks wanted permission to build a road from the Yonkers shuttle's Caryl Station to Broadway in order to alleviate traffic there. In addition, Rockwood Drive, needed to be rebuilt. There was also a third proposal to pave a trail along the Old Croton aqueduct, which had already received a coating of fill from the Jerome Park Reservoir five years beforehand. The New York City Board of Estimate received a proposal to connect Manhattan's Riverside Drive to the park in 1909, providing a direct route to the Upper West Side along what is now the Henry Hudson Parkway. No new roads were built until 1929. In the NYC Parks annual report for 1912, it was noted that the park's roads "stood the strain well," but that constant maintenance was needed to keep the roads in good shape.

In 1929, Bronx Borough President Harry Bruckner put forth plans for the Grand Concourse to be extended through the park as part of a proposed parkway system. The extension would go under Van Cortlandt Avenue, Jerome Avenue, and Gun Hill Road, going around Mosholu Avenue before taking the route of the Old Croton Aqueduct until it reached East 233rd Street. It would then turn northwest along Mosholu Avenue, crossing Tibbetts Brook and the Putnam Division before ending at the Saw Mill River Parkway. There was pushback from the New York Park Association, the Regional Plan of New York, environmentalists, city planners, and other figures such as former senator Nathan Straus, Jr. These parties' opinions on the proposed extension ranged from rerouting it elsewhere to canceling it completely. The New York State Legislature passed a law that would allow the Grand Concourse to be extended through the park. Following this, there were calls for Governor Franklin D. Roosevelt to veto the bill. Roosevelt vetoed the bill on April 17, 1929. However, there were some influential supporters of the bill, including the Bronx Board of Trade and the Bronx Chamber of Commerce. In 1931 they managed to get the extension built, albeit with a reduction in width from 182 to 80 feet (55 to 24 m).

By 1934, there was a large system of interconnected bridle paths along trails and park roads. One bridle path ran close by to the lake, intersecting with Mosholu Avenue, before looping around the Parade Ground and diverging in the Northwest Woods. The Van Cortlandt Golf Course also had trails, as did the Old Croton Aqueduct and near Jerome Avenue and Holly Lane. However, as the primary roads through the park such as Jerome, Grand, and Mosholu Avenues were constantly maintained and upgraded, secondary roads fell into a state of neglect. One such road was Rockwood Drive, which was closed in 1936 and became a bridle path.

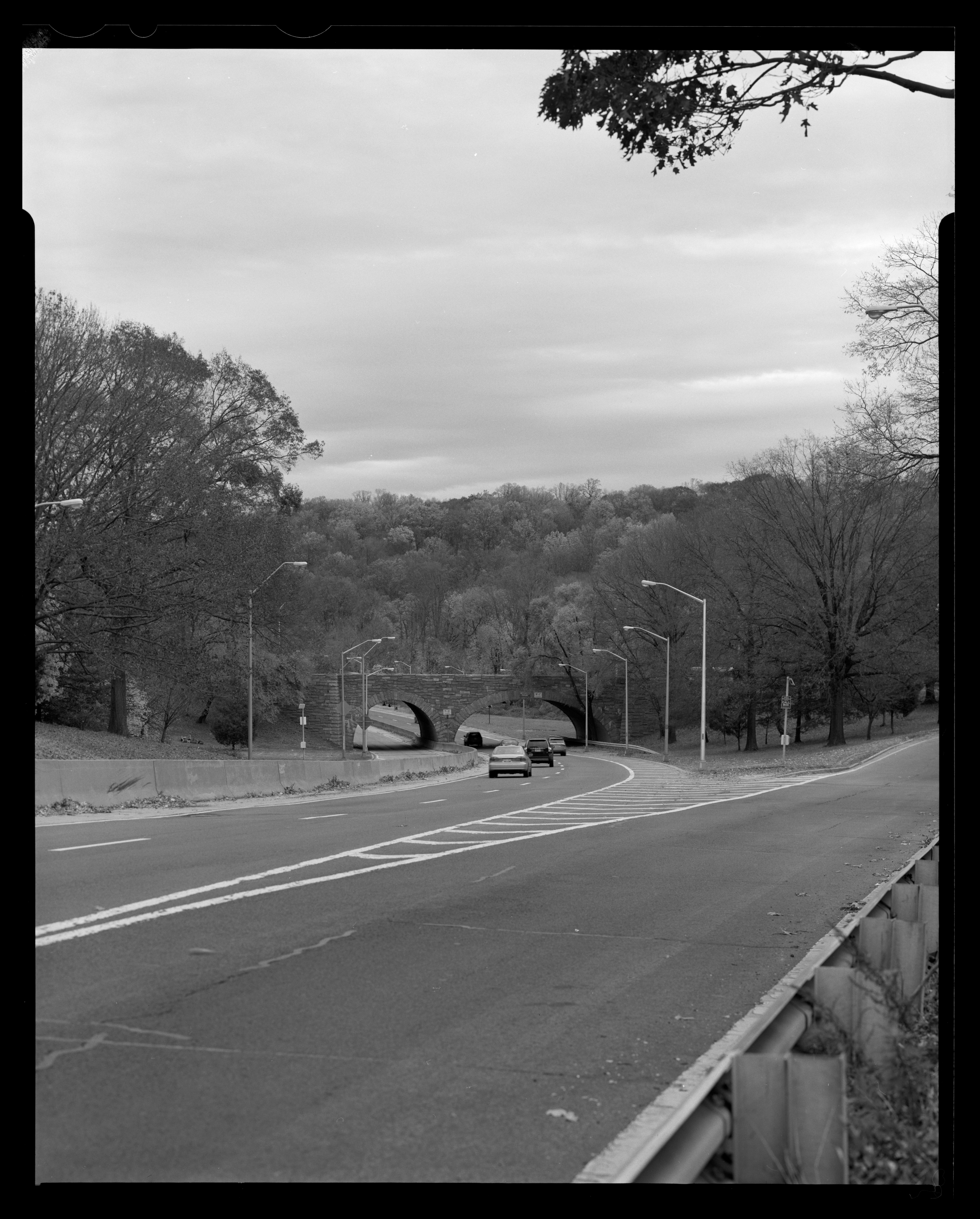
The interchange of Henry Hudson, Saw Mill, and Mosholu Parkways in the park

Highway construction in the mid-1930s further altered the park. The first of these proposals was the Grand Concourse Extension, later the Mosholu Parkway Extension, which was already being paved in 1934, when Robert Moses became Parks Commissioner. Moses immediately started planning for the Henry Hudson Parkway, which was originally envisioned as an extension of Riverside Drive. As proposed, the parkway would have only skirted the park's northwest corner in order to connect with the Saw Mill River Parkway in Westchester. However, due to that plan's high cost, the route was amended and the Henry Hudson Parkway became an extension of the West Side Elevated Highway, cutting straight through the park to intersect with the Saw Mill River Parkway. Unlike the Concourse extension, the Henry Hudson Parkway was minimally opposed by the community, as it was widely seen as an improvement. Work on the parkway began in 1935.

Simultaneously, work progressed on the Mosholu Parkway Extension, and Mosholu Avenue within the park was being modified so that it would be bisected by Henry Hudson Parkway. A bridge was constructed over the railroad in 1940, and a road linking the avenue and the new Mosholu Parkway was opened the next year. Mosholu Parkway was then extended to the Henry Hudson Parkway via a partial cloverleaf interchange built near the park's sole freshwater marsh. When biology teachers who used the marsh for their classes raised concerns about construction, an assistant to Moses said that the marsh would get a landscaping so that it looked like a series of lagoons surrounded by shrubbery.

World War II halted all highway construction. By the time the war ended, Moses had become a Construction Coordinator for the city, and in 1947, proposed the Major Deegan Expressway through the park. Since community leaders had some objections to the proposal, Moses held a public hearing to discuss it. Opponents of the plan stated that the expressway would carry heavy truck traffic, as opposed to the existing parkways, where trucks were banned. In response, Moses promised to place landscaping on the new expressway so it would fit with the park's character. This revised plan garnered the support of three prominent Bronx politicians. The expressway itself was widely endorsed, but there were five proposed routings for the highway through Van Cortlandt Park, most of which called for using the old Putnam railroad's right-of-way. The city ultimately selected Moses's plan in 1947. The 1-mile (1.6 km) link was projected to cost $30 million at the time (equivalent to $402,000,000 in 2025). Environmentalists protested the plan after finding out that this construction would demolish 32 acres (13 ha) of the marsh. Eventually, all except 7 acres (2.8 ha) were preserved, with the remaining 7 acres set aside for the Van Cortlandt golf course (see § Golf). The Major Deegan Expressway was finally opened through the park in 1955. The new expressway ran along the rights-of-way of Grand Avenue and Mosholu Avenue, causing these two roads to be demapped.

Since then, there has not been much alteration to the park's roads. As of 2014, there are five pedestrian crossings over the Major Deegan Expressway, mostly in the northern section. A sixth bridge near 233rd Street was proposed in a 2009 feasibility study, However, in 2014, plans to build the $7.5 million pedestrian bridge were deferred due to a lack of money. The next year, the city announced its intent to begin building the bridge at a cost of $12 million.

=== Former railroads ===
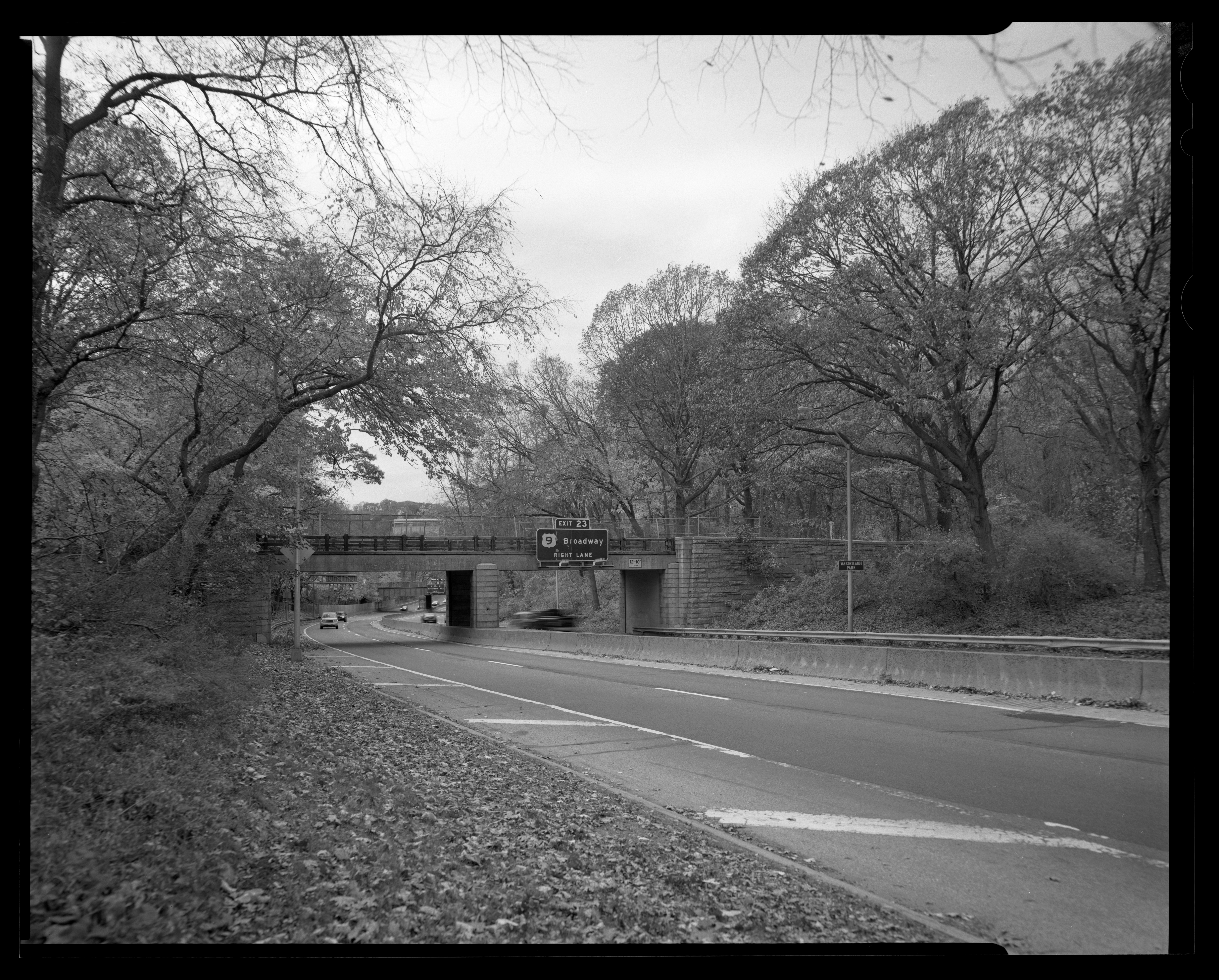
The abandoned Putnam Railroad bridge over the Henry Hudson Parkway

The New York City & Northern Railroad (later the Putnam Division of the New York Central Railroad) was built in 1880, effectively separating the park site into two parts. Its two stops in the Bronx were in the park itself, and at Kingsbridge to the south; after Kingsbridge, the railroad merged with the present-day Hudson Line of the Metro-North Railroad. The line had two tracks between the Hudson Line junction and the Van Cortlandt station, north of which the tracks merged into one. The company foreclosed in 1887, and the line went under the control of the New York and Northern Railroad Company.

Beginning in 1888, another railroad, a 2-mile (3.2 km) shuttle service operated by Yonkers Rapid Transit Railway, was built to connect Kingsbridge and Yonkers. It ran off the main New York and Putnam Railroad line immediately north of the Van Cortlandt station. There was an additional stop called Mosholu located in the northwest quadrant of the park site at Mosholu Avenue (now Mosholu Parkway). The Mosholu stop was designated as a request stop, wherein trains only stopped upon a passenger's request. A railroad crossing next to the Putnam Division's Van Cortlandt Station was replaced with an underground pedestrian passageway in 1904 to allow safe pedestrian travel in the park.

By 1942, the railroad was already seeing signs of decreased ridership: there were 600 daily riders on the Yonkers branch, down from 2,000 daily riders sixteen years prior. The Interstate Commerce Commission gave New York Central Railroad permission to abandon the branch on November 12, 1942. Subsequently, riders filed a lawsuit to keep the line open, and the federal lawsuit was heard by the United States District Court for the Southern District of New York, who ruled in favor of the railroad on June 21, 1943. Nine days later, the railroad abandoned the line. By December 1944, the rails were being removed. The main line also saw fewer riders as the years passed, and on March B, 1958, with daily ridership numbering between 400 and 500 commuters, the New York State Public Service Commission gave its approval for the railroad to stop passenger service on the line. The last day of service was June 1, 1958, and the station was abandoned, the line now only being used for freight. Conrail continued to operate the line for freight use, though by 1979 trains only ran twice a day, and hikers often utilized the underused train tracks.

=== Modern mass transit ===
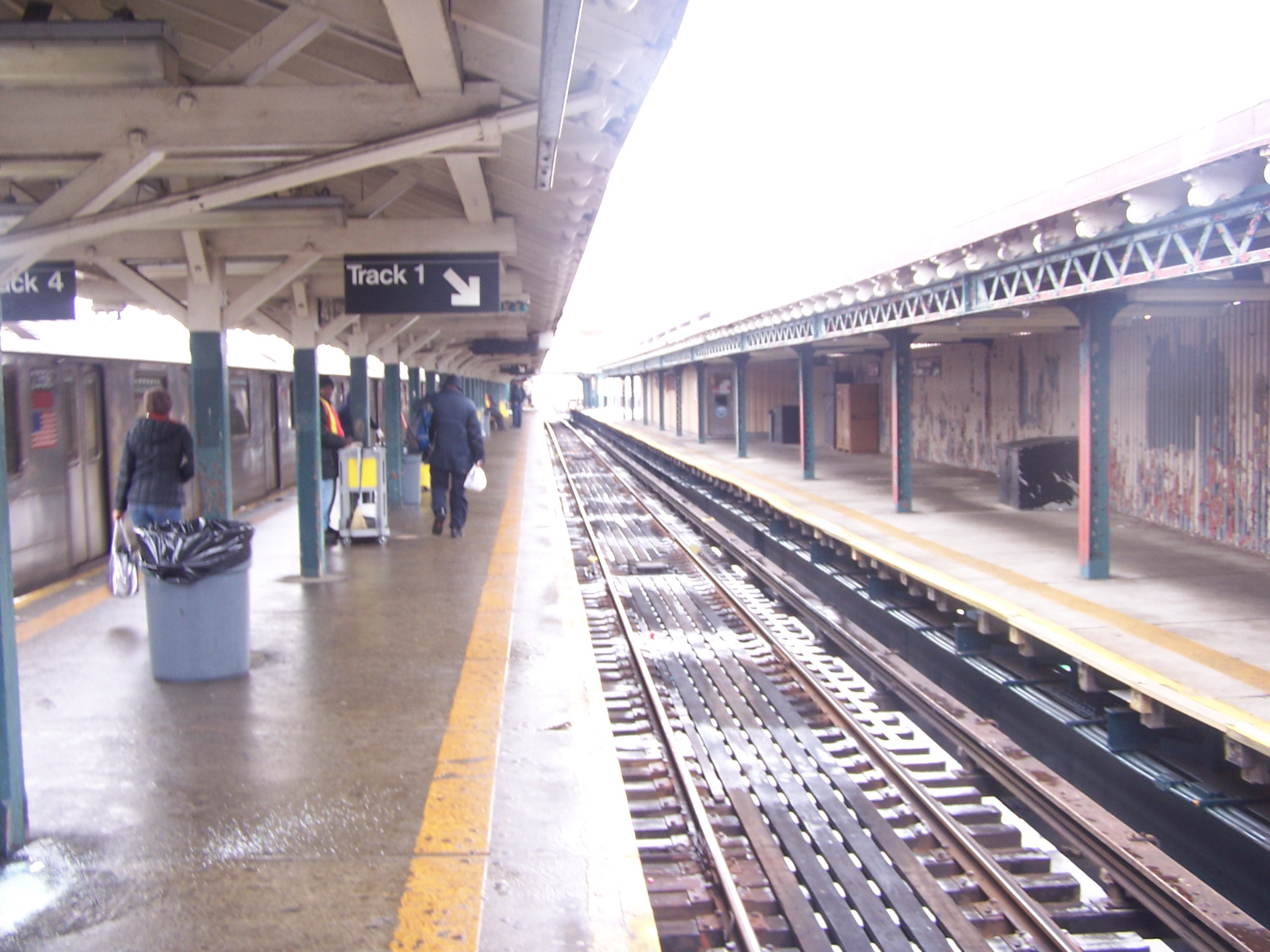
The Van Cortlandt Park–242nd Street station

There are two nearby New York City Subway stations. The eastern side of the park is served by Woodlawn (4 train), and the western side by 242nd Street (1 train). The 242nd Street station was part of the first subway line of the Interborough Rapid Transit Company, running along the current IRT Broadway–Seventh Avenue Line to City Hall and later South Ferry. The station, serving as the line's northern terminal, opened in 1908. The Woodlawn station was built later as part of the IRT Jerome Avenue Line, opening in April 1918 as the line's northern terminus.

Bus service is provided by New York City Bus's Bx9, Bx10, Bx16, and Bx34 local routes and its BxM3 and BxM4 express routes. Bee-Line Bus System's 1, 2, 3, 4, 20, and 21 routes also provide service to Westchester.

== In popular culture ==
Van Cortlandt Park appears in the Nero Wolfe detective stories by Rex Stout. It is where the bodies of several murder victims are found – Joan Wellman in Murder by the Book (1951) and Simon Jacobs in Plot It Yourself (1959). The park is also where the climactic scene of the 1944 novella Booby Trap takes place. The guilty Congressman Shattuck kills himself with a hand grenade after Nero Wolfe convinces him there is no chance of escaping justice.

In Sol Yurick's 1965 novel The Warriors, the meeting between New York street gangs called by Ismael Rivera, leader of the Delancey Thrones, takes place in Van Cortlandt Park. In the 1979 film adaptation of Yurick's novel, one of the gangs is called "The Van Cortlandt Rangers."

The park is also the place of many happy memories of Horse Badorties, protagonist of William Kotzwinkle's 1974 book The Fan Man. In Philip Kaufman's 1979 film The Wanderers, a football game between The Wanderers and rivals the Del Bombers occurs at Van Cortlandt Park. However, none of the scenes were filmed in the Bronx. Van Cortlandt Park was referenced in José Rivera's play Marisol as a place where neo-Nazis burn homeless people alive in the apocalyptic world of the play.

== See also ==
- List of NCAA Division I baseball venues
- Delaware Tribe of Indians

== Notes and references ==
=== Sources ===
- "1899 New York City Department of Public Parks Annual Report" (PDF). nyc.gov. New York City Department of Parks and Recreation. December 31, 1899. Archived (PDF) from the original on February 11, 2017.
- "1900 New York City Department of Public Parks Annual Report" (PDF). nyc.gov. New York City Department of Parks and Recreation. 1900. Archived (PDF) from the original on February 1, 2017.
- "1901 New York City Department of Public Parks Annual Report" (PDF). nyc.gov. New York City Department of Parks and Recreation. 1901. Archived (PDF) from the original on January 18, 2017.
- "1902 New York City Department of Public Parks Annual Report (Part 2)" (PDF). nyc.gov. New York City Department of Parks and Recreation. 1902. Archived from the original (PDF) on January 16, 2017.
- "1903 New York City Department of Public Parks Annual Report" (PDF). nyc.gov. New York City Department of Parks and Recreation. 1903. Archived from the original (PDF) on January 16, 2017.
- "1904 New York City Department of Public Parks Annual Report" (PDF). nyc.gov. New York City Department of Parks and Recreation. 1904. Archived (PDF) from the original on February 3, 2017.
- "1905 New York City Department of Public Parks Annual Report" (PDF). nyc.gov. New York City Department of Parks and Recreation. 1905. Archived (PDF) from the original on February 11, 2017.
- "1906 New York City Department of Public Parks Annual Report" (PDF). nyc.gov. New York City Department of Parks and Recreation. December 31, 1906. Archived (PDF) from the original on February 11, 2017.
- "1907 New York City Department of Public Parks Annual Report" (PDF). nyc.gov. New York City Department of Parks and Recreation. December 31, 1907. Archived (PDF) from the original on January 16, 2017.
- "1909 New York City Department of Public Parks Annual Report" (PDF). nyc.gov. New York City Department of Parks and Recreation. 1909. Archived (PDF) from the original on January 16, 2017.
- "1911 New York City Department of Public Parks Annual Report" (PDF). nyc.gov. New York City Department of Parks and Recreation. 1911. Archived (PDF) from the original on January 16, 2017.
- "1912 New York City Department of Public Parks Annual Report (Part 2)" (PDF). nyc.gov. New York City Department of Parks and Recreation. 1912. Archived from the original (PDF) on January 16, 2017.
- "1914 New York City Department of Public Parks Annual Report (Part 3)" (PDF). nyc.gov. New York City Department of Parks and Recreation. 1914. Archived (PDF) from the original on January 13, 2017.
- "1916 New York City Department of Public Parks Annual Report". New York City Parks Department. 1916. Archived from the original on February 14, 2017.
- "Board of Commissioners of the NYC Dept of Public Parks – Minutes and Documents: May 4, 1892 – April 26, 1893" (PDF). New York City Department of Parks and Recreation. April 30, 1894. Archived (PDF) from the original on February 3, 2018.
- "Board of Commissioners of the NYC Dept of Public Parks – Minutes and Documents: May 1, 1893 – April 25, 1894" (PDF). New York City Department of Parks and Recreation. April 30, 1894. Archived (PDF) from the original on February 3, 2018.
- "Board of Commissioners of the NYC Dept of Public Parks – Minutes and Documents: May 3, 1897 – April 28, 1898" (PDF). nyc.gov. New York City Department of Parks and Recreation. April 28, 1898. Archived (PDF) from the original on February 3, 2018.
- "Board of Commissioners of the NYC Dept of Public Parks – Minutes: January 4, 1917 – December 27, 1917" (PDF). nyc.gov. New York City Department of Parks and Recreation. December 27, 1917. Archived (PDF) from the original on February 3, 2018.
- Caro, Robert (1974). The Power Broker: Robert Moses and the Fall of New York. New York: Knopf. ISBN 978-0-394-48076-3.
- Ferris, Morris Patterson (1897). Van Cortlandt Mansion: Erected 1748, Now in the Custody of the Colonial Dames of the State of New York. De Vinne Press.
- Gallo, Daniel; Kramer, Frederick (1981). The Putnam division: New York Central's bygone route through Westchester County (1st ed.). New York, N.Y.: Quadrant Press. ISBN 978-0-915276-29-5.
- Gonzalez, Evelyn (2004). The Bronx. Columbia University Press. ISBN 978-0-231-50835-3.
- Hennessy, Joseph P. (1921). "1921 Bronx Borough Parks Department Annual Report" (PDF). nyc.gov. New York City Department of Parks and Recreation. Archived from the original (PDF) on January 13, 2017.
- Hennessy, Joseph P. (1922). "1922 Bronx Borough Parks Department Annual Report" (PDF). nyc.gov. New York City Department of Parks and Recreation. Archived (PDF) from the original on February 21, 2017.
- Jackson, Kenneth T., ed. (2010). The Encyclopedia of New York City (2nd ed.). New Haven: Yale University Press. ISBN 978-0-300-11465-2.
- O'Hea Anderson, Marianne (June 1996). "Native Americans" (PDF). Administrator's Office, Van Cortlandt & Pelham Bay Parks, City of New York Parks & Recreation. Archived from the original (PDF) on September 2, 2016.
- "Van Cortlandt Park, Borough of the Bronx: Restoration Master Plan, Part 1" (PDF). New York City Parks Department, Storch Associates. 1986. Archived (PDF) from the original on December 27, 2016.
- "Van Cortlandt Park, Borough of the Bronx: Restoration Master Plan, Part 2" (PDF). New York City Parks Department, Storch Associates. 1986. Archived (PDF) from the original on December 27, 2016.
- "Van Cortlandt Park History" (PDF). the Administrator's Office Van Cortlandt & Pelham Bay Parks, City of New York Parks & Recreation. June 1986. Archived from the original (PDF) on January 4, 2016.
- "Van Cortlandt Park Master Plan 2030". New York City Parks Department. July 15, 2014. Archived from the original on January 7, 2017.
- "Van Cortlandt Park Parade Ground; Phase 1A Archaeological Investigation; Borough of the Bronx, New York" (PDF). New York City Parks Department. November 2007. Archived (PDF) from the original on December 27, 2016.
- "Van Cortlandt Park Woodland Trail Master Plan Prepared for The Friends of Van Cortlandt Park" (PDF). New York-New Jersey Trail Conference. December 2009. Archived (PDF) from the original on August 26, 2016.

=== Further reading ===
- Ultan, Lloyd (1983). A history of Van Cortlandt Park. New York: Storch Associates. Archived from the original on January 10, 2017.
