= Mosholu Golf Course =

Golf course in the Bronx, New York

Coordinates: 40°53′21″N 73°52′53″W

Mosholu Golf Course is a public, nine-hole golf course at Van Cortlandt Park in the Woodlawn neighborhood of The Bronx, New York, US. It is one of New York City's municipal courses and located adjacent to the Woodlawn station on the IRT Jerome Avenue Line (served by the New York City Subway's 4 train). The course was built in 1914 and also features a driving range and putting green which also function as a water treatment plant.

It was originally designed as an eighteen-hole course, but is now nine due to road construction in the neighborhood.
