= Croton Aqueduct =

Aqueduct in New York (1842–1955)

- Old Croton Aqueduct
- U.S. National Register of Historic Places
- U.S. National Historic Landmark
- New York State Register of Historic Places
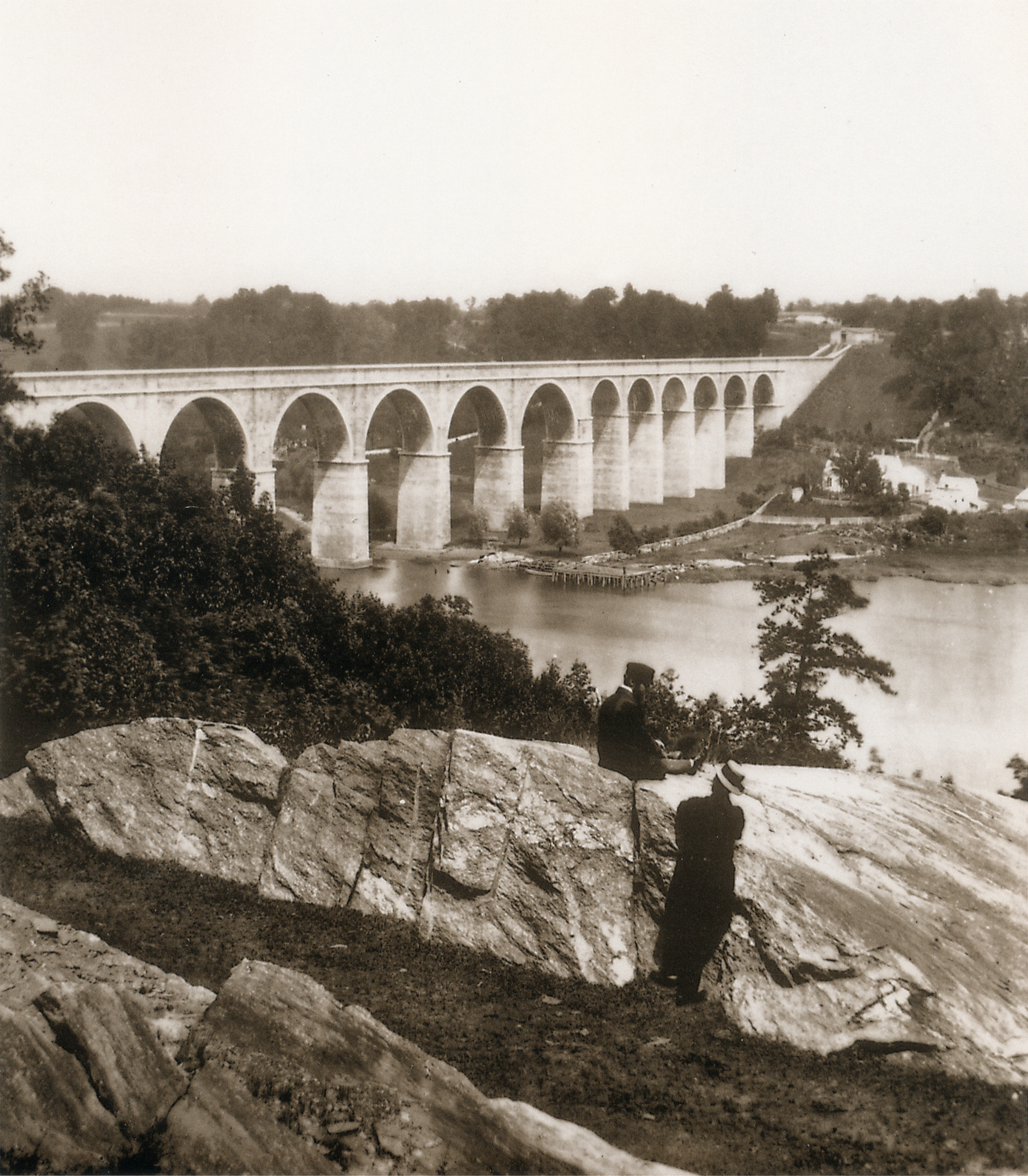
- The Croton Aqueduct at High Bridge in 1859

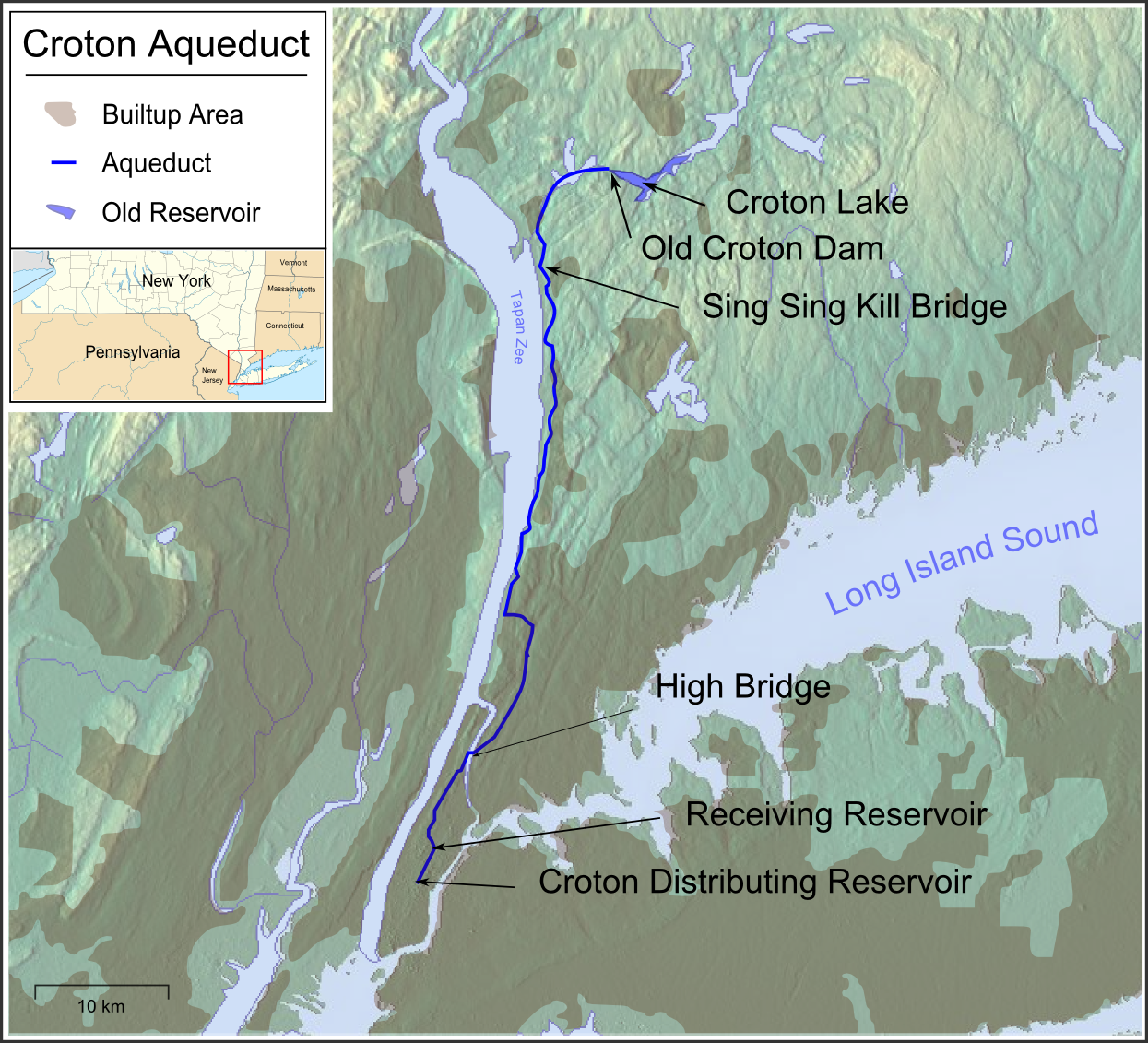
- Location of Croton Aqueduct
- Nearest city: New York City, New York
- Built: 1837–1842
- Architect: John B. Jervis; David Douglass; James Renwick Jr.
- NRHP reference No.: 74001324
- NYSRHP No.: 11912.000082

Significant dates
- Added to NRHP: December 2, 1974
- Designated NHL: April 27, 1992
- Designated NYSRHP: June 23, 1980

The Croton Aqueduct or Old Croton Aqueduct was a large and complex water distribution system constructed as part of the New York City water supply system between 1837 and 1842. The aqueducts, which were among the first in the United States, carried water by gravity 41 miles (66 km) from the Croton River in Westchester County to reservoirs in Manhattan. It was built because local water resources had become polluted and inadequate for the growing population of New York City. Although the aqueduct was largely superseded by the New Croton Aqueduct, which was built in 1885-1890, the Old Croton Aqueduct remained in service until 1955.

== Background ==
The island of Manhattan, surrounded by brackish rivers, had a limited supply of freshwater available. It dwindled as the city grew rapidly after the American Revolutionary War, and freshwater sources became polluted by effluent. Before the aqueduct was constructed, residents of New York obtained water from cisterns, wells, natural springs, and other bodies of water. Rapid population growth in the 19th century and encroachment on these areas as Manhattan moved further north of Wall Street, led to the pollution of many local fresh water sources. Below Grand Street, a small number of well-off customers of the Manhattan Company had fresh water delivered to them, but that company was actually more focused on banking—it eventually became Chase Manhattan—and only paid as much attention to its water activities as it needed to avoid losing the state charter that allowed it to bank. The poor and the rest of the city were forced to rely on well water, often made palatable by adding alcoholic spirits, prompting temperance campaigners to call for the municipal provision of water.

The unsanitary conditions caused an increase in disease. Epidemics of yellow fever ravaged the city. A polluted aquifer, overcrowded housing, the lack of sewers, public ignorance of basic sanitary conditions, and the existence of polluting industries near wells and residential areas contributed to an unprecedented mortality rate of 2.6% (1 death per 39 inhabitants) in 1830. Then in 1832 cholera first reached New York in the deadliest epidemic to that date. The need for a new supply of fresh water was crucial.

== Construction ==
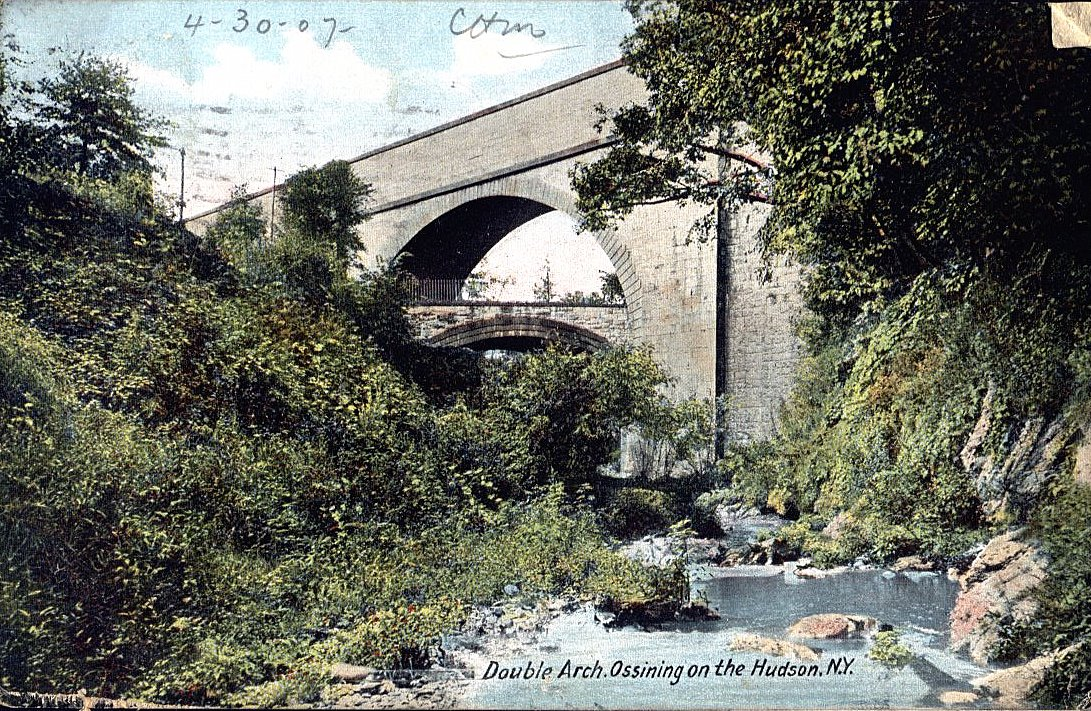
Double Arch over Sing Sing Kill, Ossining, from a 1907 postcard; upper arch carries the aqueduct, the lower one carries a local street

In March 1833, Major David Bates Douglass, engineering professor at West Point Military Academy, was appointed to survey and estimate the proposed route. In 1837, construction began on a massive engineering project, to divert water from sources upstate, following a route surveyed by Douglass and supervised by Douglass' successor, Chief Engineer John B. Jervis. Jervis had exacting specifications for each segment of the route; he strictly guided progress and discouraged liquor consumption by workers anywhere near the construction sites. The Croton River was dammed, aqueducts were built, tunnels dug, piping laid, and reservoirs created.

The gravity-fed aqueduct dropped 13 inches per mile, 1/4" per 100' (~0.02%). An elliptical tube, 8.5 feet (2.6m) high by 7.5 feet (2.3m) wide, of iron piping encased in brick masonry was laid, sometimes in cuts. Conical ventilating towers, also called shafts, 10 to 20 feet high, were placed every mile or so to relieve pressure and keep the water fresh. Every third ventilator (e.g., #3, #6, #9) was built with a door at the base to allow workers to enter the tunnel for maintenance. Hydraulic cement was added where the aqueduct crossed rivers. It extended from the Old Croton Dam in northern Westchester County to the Harlem River, where it continued over the High Bridge at 173rd Street and down the West Side of Manhattan and finally into a Receiving Reservoir located between 79th and 86th streets and Sixth and Seventh Avenues; the site is now the Great Lawn and Turtle Pond in Central Park. The Receiving Reservoir was a rectangular tank within fortress-like rusticated retaining walls, 1,826 feet (557 m) long and 836 feet (255 m) wide; it held up to 180 million US gallons (680,000 m^{3}) of water. 35 million US gallons (130,000 m^{3}) flowed into it daily from northern Westchester.

From the Receiving Reservoir, water flowed down to the Croton Distributing Reservoir, better known simply as the Croton Reservoir, a similar fortified tank located on Fifth Avenue between 40th Street and 42nd Street, where the New York Public Library Main Branch and Bryant Park are located today. This reservoir was built to resemble ancient Egyptian architecture. New Yorkers came uptown for the fine view of the city obtained from atop its walls.

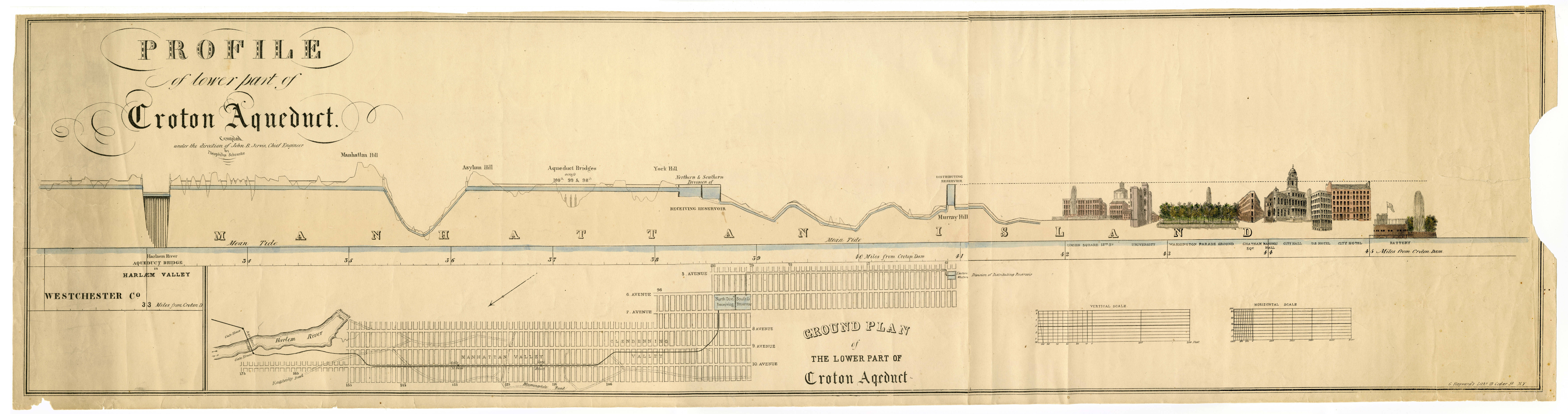
Profile and ground plan of the lower part of Croton Aqueduct

== Operation ==
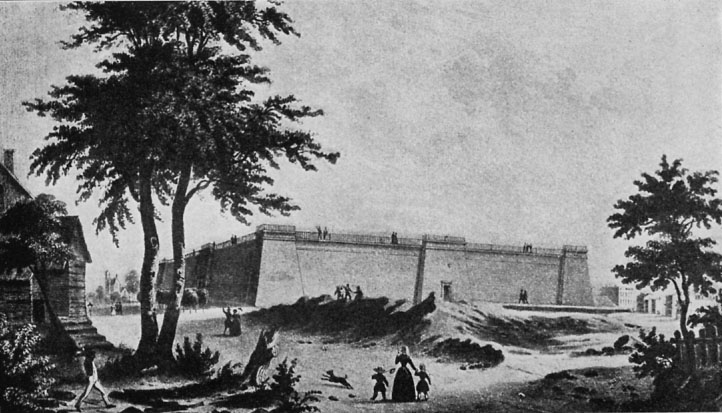
Croton Distributing Reservoir (1842)

Water started flowing through the aqueduct on June 22, 1842, taking 22 hours for gravity to take the water the 41 miles (66 km) (at a velocity of 1.86 miles per hour [2.99 km/h; 2.73 ft/s]) to reach Manhattan. The Croton Aqueduct opened to public use with great fanfare on October 14, 1842. The day-long celebration culminated in a fountain of water that spouted to a height of 50 feet (15 m) from the beautifully decorated cast iron Croton Fountain in City Hall Park. The famous Bethesda Fountain in New York's Central Park, unveiled in 1873, is another tribute to the Croton Aqueduct.

Even though only 6,175 houses had been connected to the system by 1844, the Croton water had already dramatically improved both domestic hygiene and interior design. Baths and running water were being built in the private homes of wealthy New Yorkers, and public bathing facilities were constructed for the masses. The water system had another inadvertent consequence. The decline in the number of residents drawing water from the city's wells resulted in a rise in the water table, which flooded many cellars. To address this problem, the city built sewers in many residential streets. By 1852, 148 miles (238 km) of sewers had already been constructed.

About this time the German cockroach attracted attention and was called the "Croton bug" in the mistaken belief that the aqueduct brought the insects into the homes being connected to the new water supply system.

Despite its size, the capacity of the Old Croton Aqueduct could not keep up with the growth of New York City, and construction on a New Croton Aqueduct began in 1885 a few miles east. The new aqueduct, buried much deeper than the old one, went into service in 1890, with three times the capacity of the Old Croton Aqueduct. It currently supplies 10 percent of New York City's water. The Croton Receiving Reservoir continued to supply New York City with drinking water until 1940, when Commissioner of Parks and Recreation Robert Moses ordered it drained and filled to create the Great Lawn and Turtle Pond in Central Park. The old aqueduct remained in service until 1955. In 1987 the northernmost portion was reopened to provide water to Ossining.

== Reused portions ==
=== Old Croton Trail ===
Old Croton Trail
- Length: 26.2 mi (42.2 km)
- Location: Westchester County, New York, U.S.
- Trailheads: Van Cortlandt Park, New York; Croton Gorge Park, New York
- Use: Hiking, Biking, Jogging
- Difficulty: Easy
- Season: Year round
- Sights: Lyndhurst
- Hazards: Poison ivy, uneven grades, rough or muddy trail surface, at-grade road intersections.

The linear Old Croton Trail extends for 26.2 miles (42.2 km) in Westchester County, providing public access along all but four segments—in the Getty Square neighborhood of downtown Yonkers, Tarrytown, Scarborough and Ossining—along the route of the aqueduct. It crosses the lawn of the Lyndhurst estate, following the aqueduct's easement. The trail enters New York City on the eastern side of Van Cortlandt Park; the aqueduct runs through the Bronx under Aqueduct Walk and alongside Aqueduct Avenue, and it continues under the southern part of University Avenue.

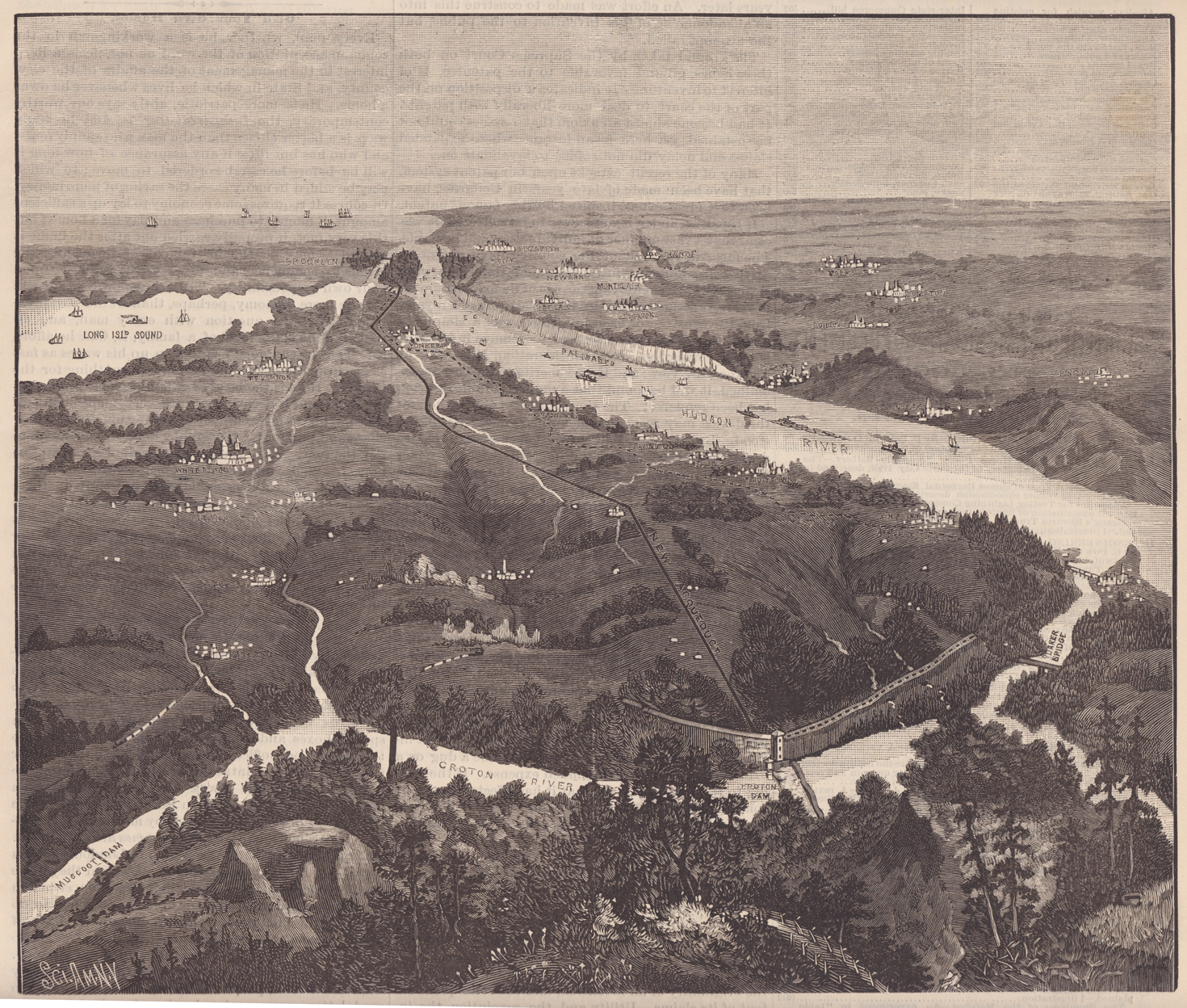
1887 engraving from Scientific American shows Old Croton Aqueduct in dotted line looking south from Putnam County. Croton Reservoir in foreground; Manhattan in far background.

Both the trail and the tunnel are part of the Old Croton Aqueduct State Historic Park, which was created in 1968 and encompasses the northernmost 26 miles (42 km) of the aqueduct and its right-of-way, from Croton Gorge Park to the Yonkers-New York City line. It lies wholly within Westchester County but is under the jurisdiction of the Taconic Region of the New York State Office of Parks, Recreation and Historic Preservation.

The trail runs roughly parallel to Metro North's Hudson Line from northern Yonkers to Scarborough and is accessible from numerous stations on that line. The trail briefly parallels the Rockefeller State Park Preserve and its trails. Access to the trail is easiest where it crosses Route 9, known variously as Albany Post Road, Broadway, or Highland Avenue.

Heading southbound into downtown Yonkers, the trail goes on-street at Bishop William J. Walls Place and N. Broadway, where it follows the sidewalk on N. Broadway for one block, and then makes a left onto Ashburton Avenue going east. At Palisades Avenue, it makes a right and the trail bed restarts.

Remnants of the aqueduct still exist and can be seen along the trail, including 21 of the original 33 stone ventilating towers (shafts), three stone weirs (chambers which were used to empty the aqueduct for maintenance), and one "Keeper's House" located in Dobbs Ferry. The locations of ventilating towers along the trail within the Old Croton Aqueduct State Historic Park are:

- #1-#3: near New Croton Dam (these are largely submerged or modified due to the construction of the dam)
- #4-#8: Croton-on-Hudson to Ossining (some of them in wooded sections of the trail)
- #9: Ossining (Spring & Everett St.; one of the most notable, it is more ornate than others and has the builder's name and year "1840" engraved on the base)
- #10-#12: Ossining to Briarcliff Manor to Archville
- #13-#15: Sleepy Hollow/Tarrytown (in residential areas near the Rockefeller State Park Preserve)
- #16-#17: Tarrytown/Irvington (between Lyndhurst and Sunnyside)
- #18: Irvington (notable for its distinct shape and colorful stone base)
- #19: Dobbs Ferry (near the Keeper's House)
- #20-#21: Hastings-on-Hudson (in a wooded section of the trail)
- #22-#24: Yonkers (including one near Untermyer Park and Gardens)
- #25-#33: The Bronx and Manhattan (all demolished as the city developed, though the site of #33 was rediscovered on St. Nicholas Avenue in Manhattan in 2011)

The hamlet of Archville along the aqueduct route was founded as a community of laborers building the Croton Aqueduct. It was named after an arched bridge that carried the aqueduct over the highway, present-day U.S. Route 9. Built in 1839 and demolished in 1924 as a traffic hazard, the Archville Bridge is commemorated on two plaques on the western end of the pedestrian, trail-walking bridge that later replaced it. South of Archville, the trail runs over the Mill River Culvert, which looks like a towering masonry wall. It is an 80-feet-high earthen and stone embankment designed to keep the aqueduct at a consistent, gentle slope (13 inches per mile) as it crosses the deep valley of the Pocantico River near Sleepy Hollow Cemetery.

The Keeper's House in Dobbs Ferry was built in 1857 and is the only remaining of four Keeper's Houses that is both on the aqueduct and open to the public. The only other remaining Keeper's House is located in Ossining, but it was moved off the aqueduct, is privately owned, and is not open to visitors. The portion of the Old Croton Aqueduct in Westchester County was added to the National Register of Historic Places in 1974. When the aqueduct was listed as a National Historic Landmark in 1992, the NRHP designation was extended to cover the aqueduct's route in the Bronx and in Highbridge Park, Manhattan. The Croton Water Supply System was also designated as a National Historic Civil Engineering Landmark by the American Society of Civil Engineers in 1975.

The interior of the Old Croton Aqueduct has been documented by explorers including Miru Kim and historian Steve Duncan.

=== Aqueduct Walk ===
Aqueduct Walk is a community park in the Bronx, New York City, running between Kingsbridge Road and Tremont Avenue. Aqueduct Walk is designated as an official New York City scenic landmark.

== Gallery ==
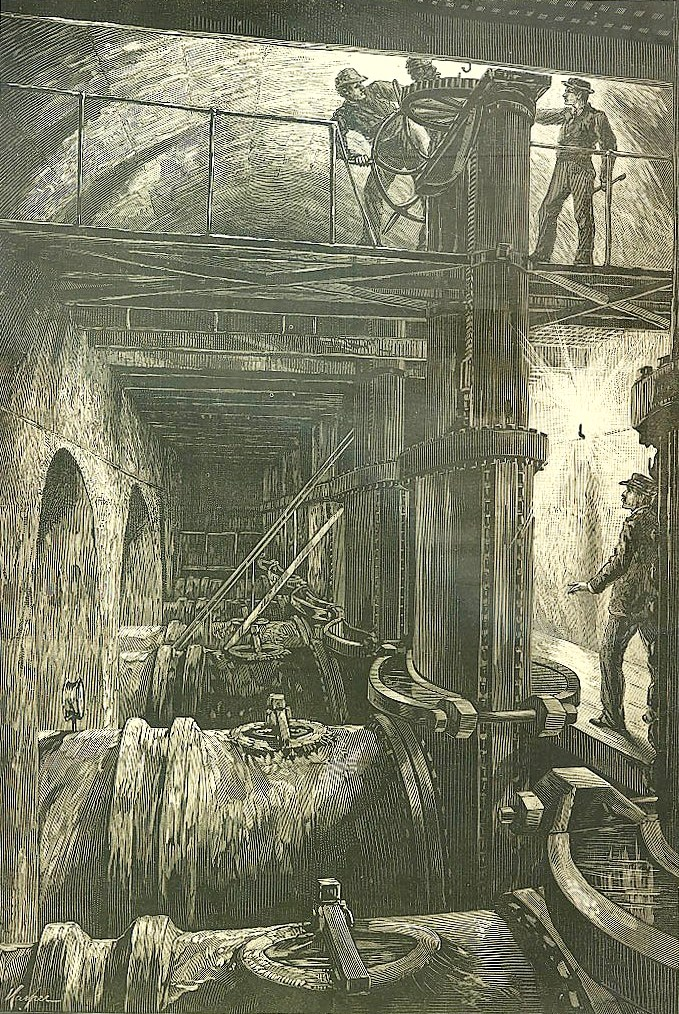
"Shutting off the Croton", from Harper's Weekly (November 12, 1881)

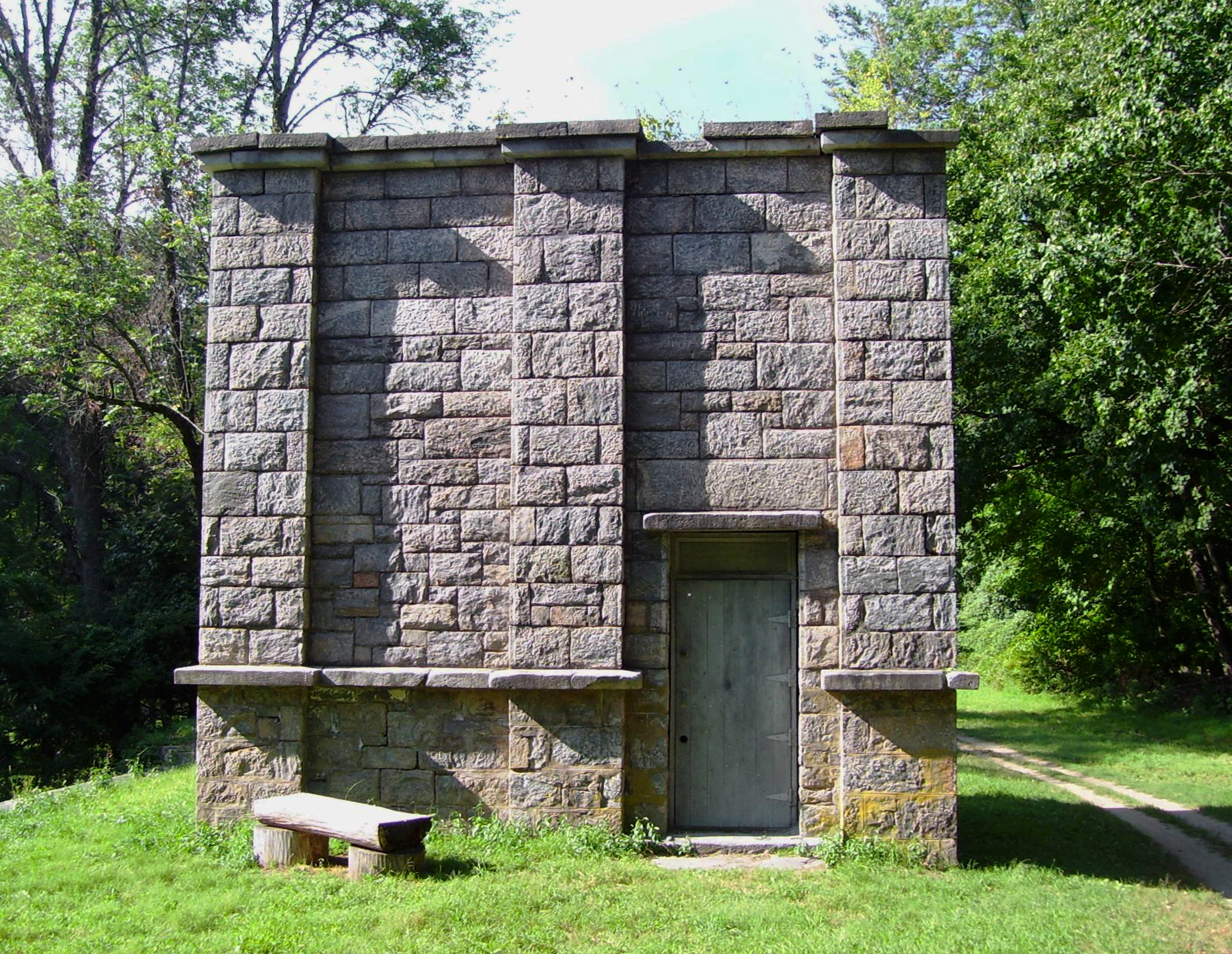
A weir in Sleepy Hollow. The weir chambers were used to empty the aqueduct for maintenance by diverting the waters to a nearby waterway. The line could be emptied in two hours.

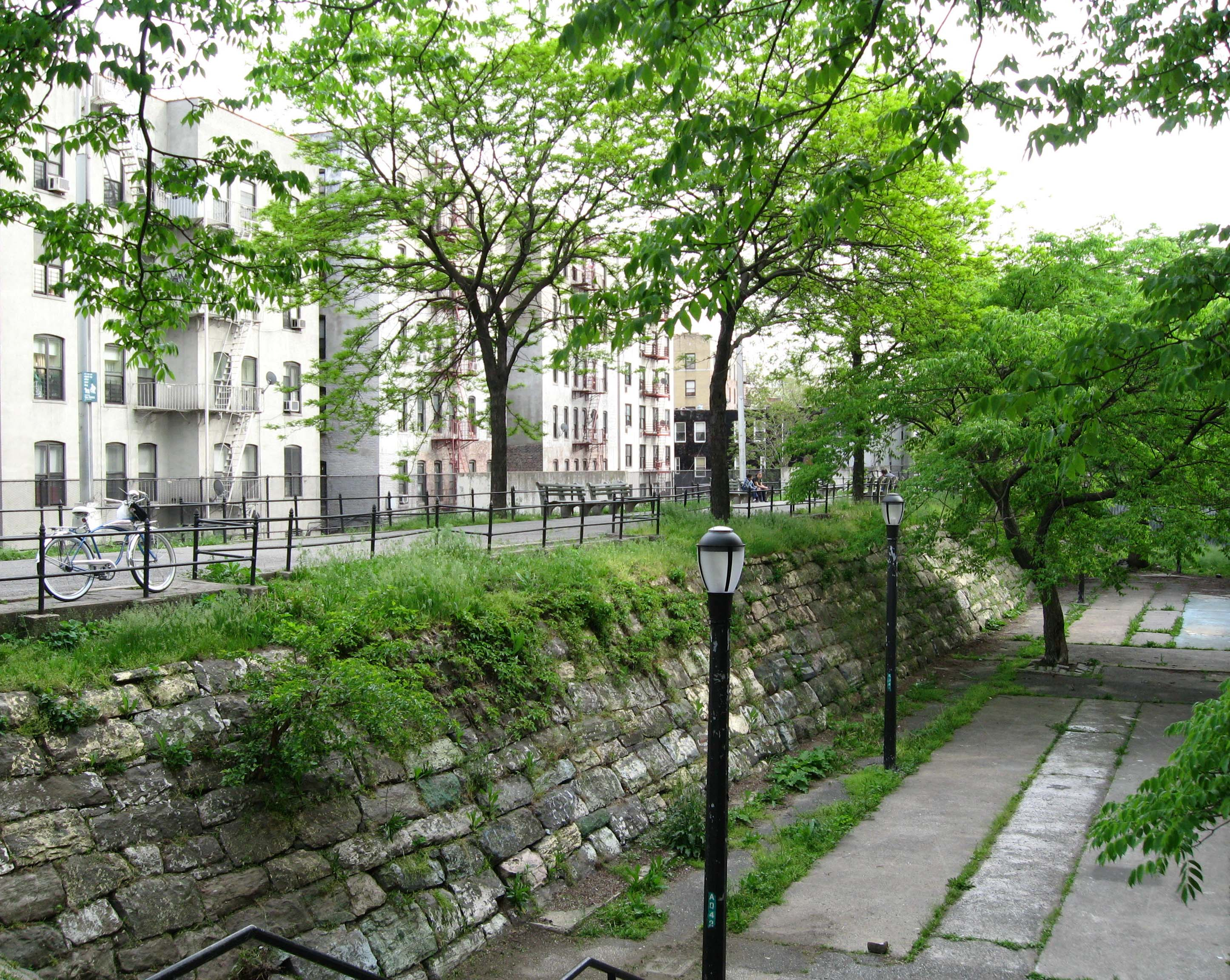
Croton Walk, south of Kingsbridge Road, Bronx

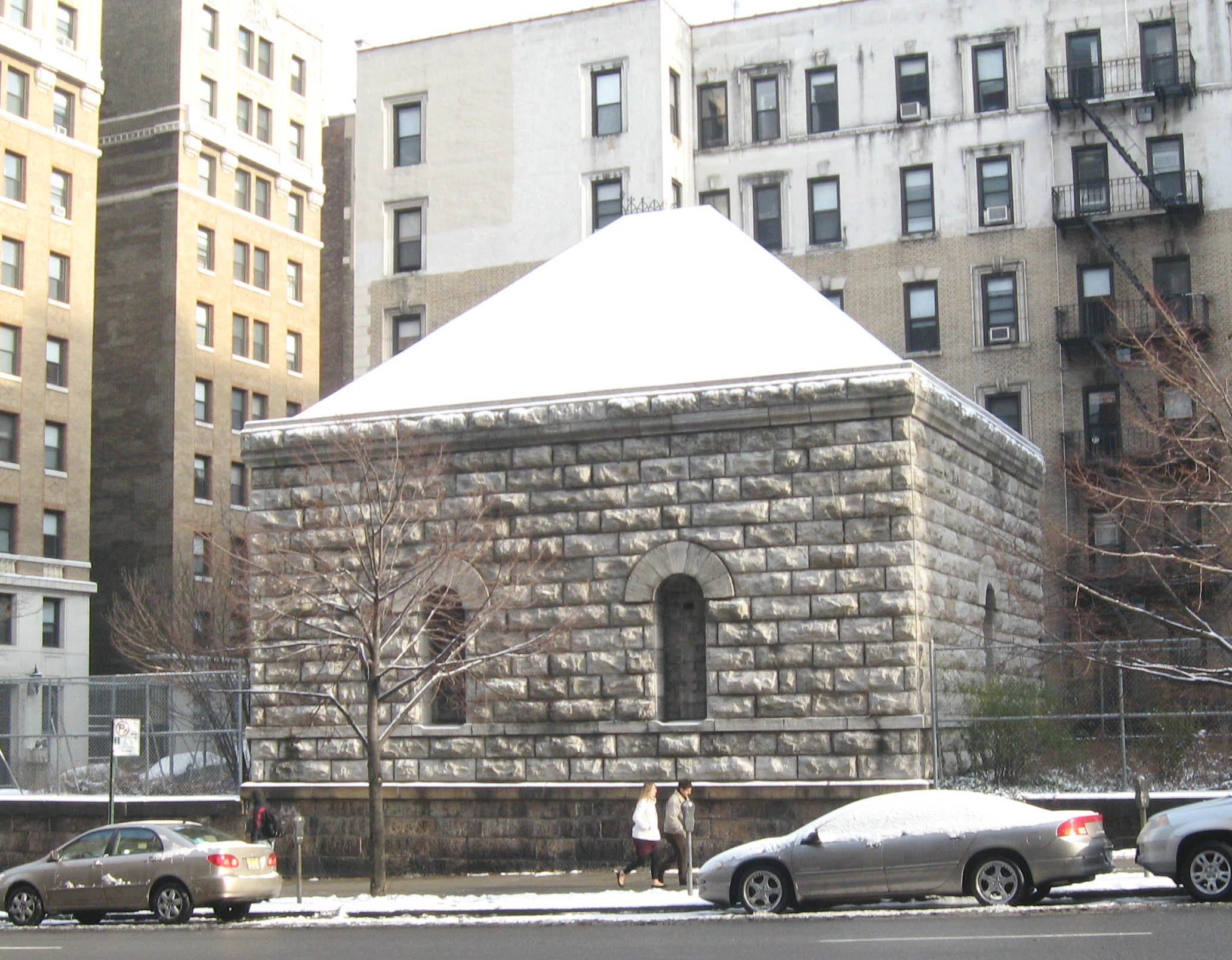
119th Street gatehouse, Manhattan

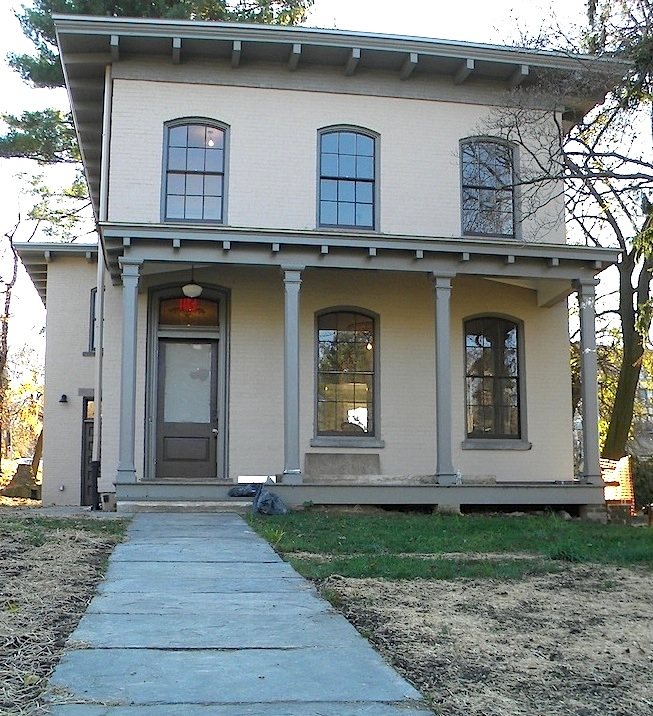
1857 Keeper's House in Dobbs Ferry; open to the public.

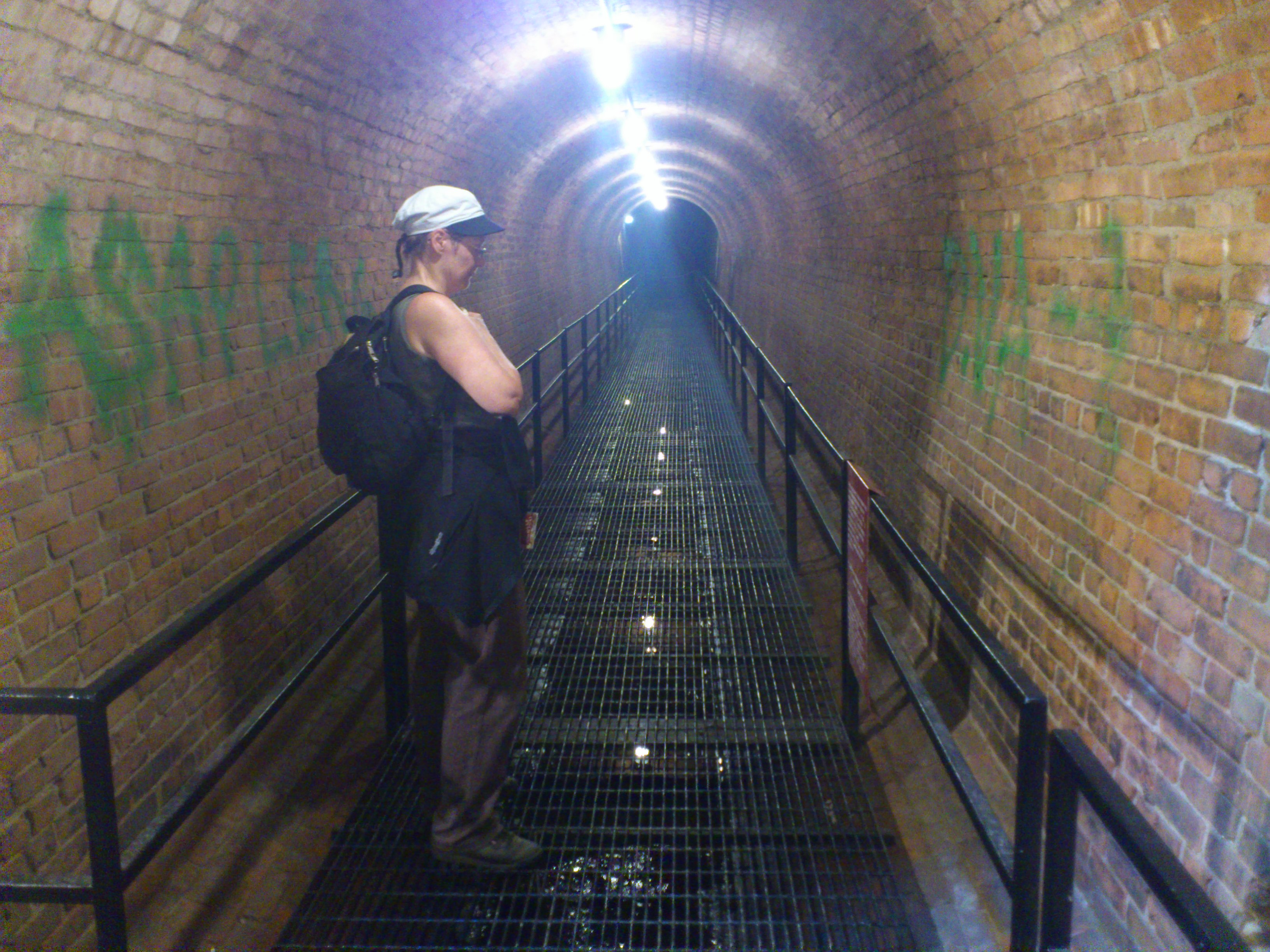
Inside the Old Croton Aqueduct at the weir in Ossining

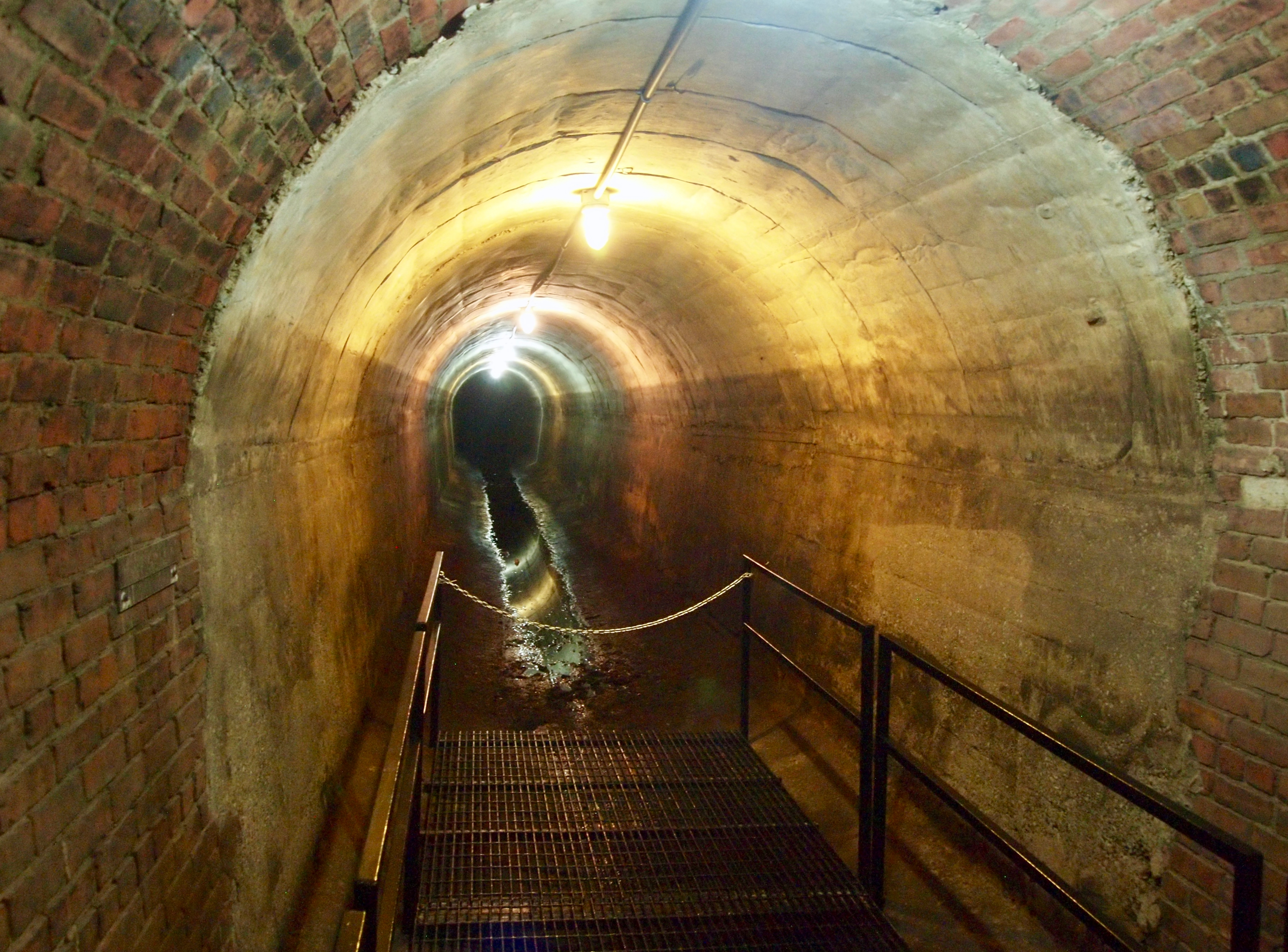
A section of aqueduct inside a viaduct with hydraulic cement lining

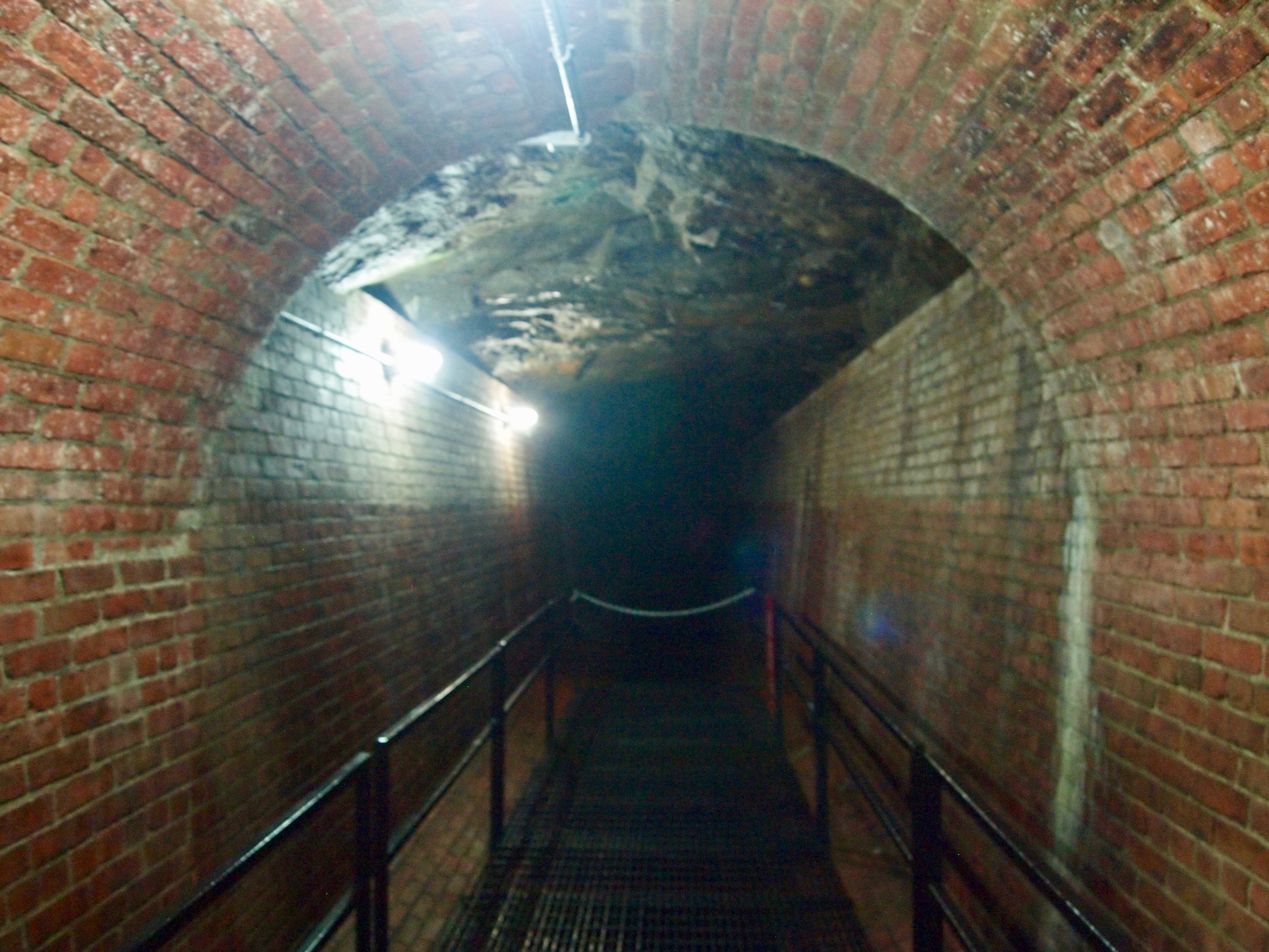
A section of aqueduct with brick walls and exposed ceiling

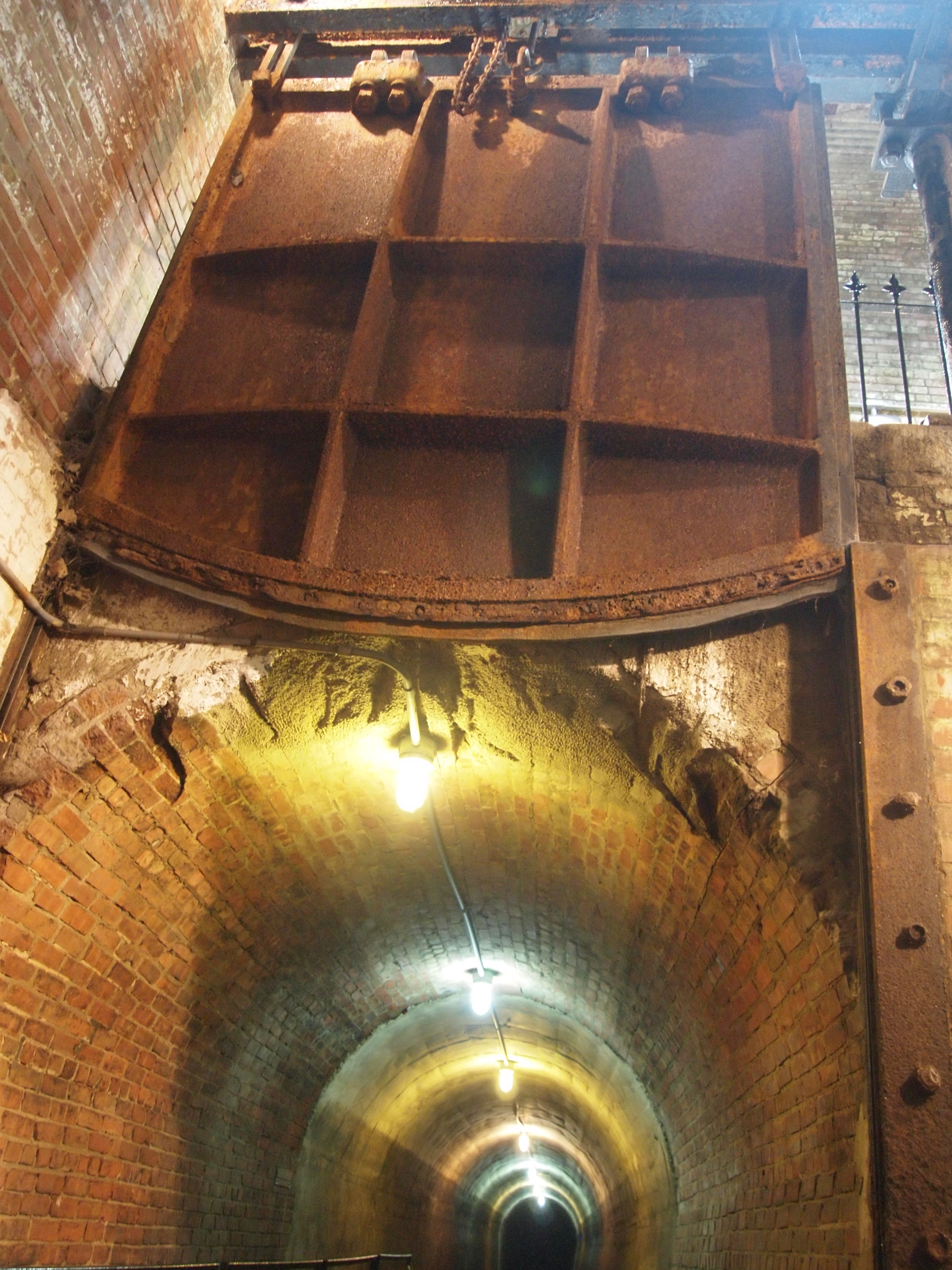
A gate at Ossining Weir to close the aqueduct off for maintenance

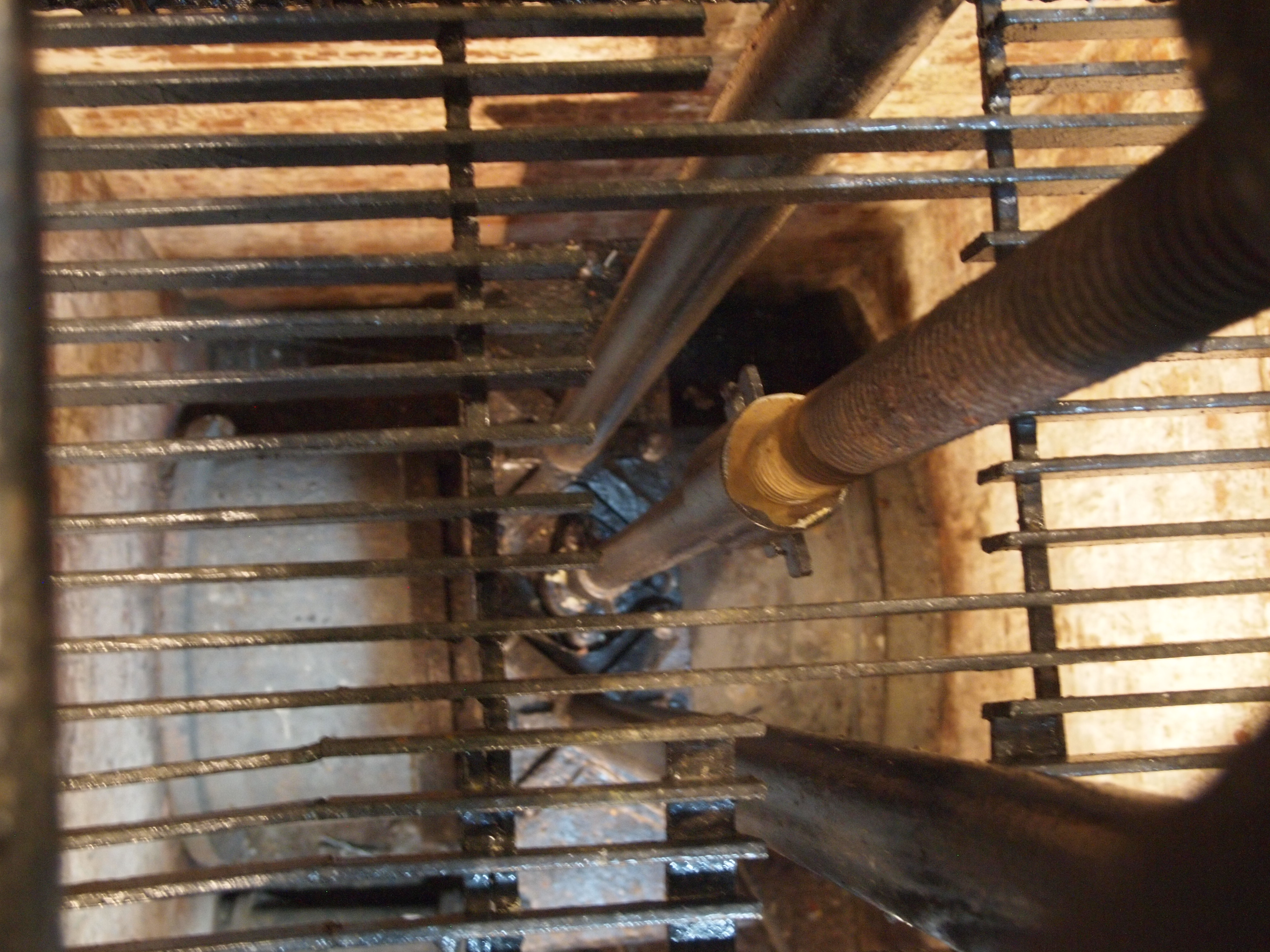
A valve at Ossining Weir to redirect water out of the aqueduct

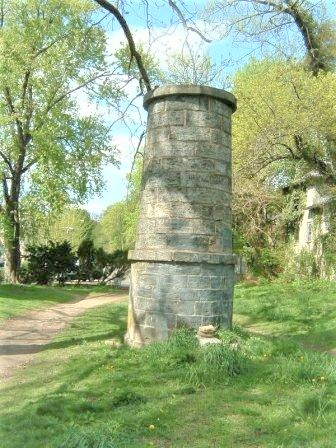
Ventilating tower No. 16, Irvington (May 2005)

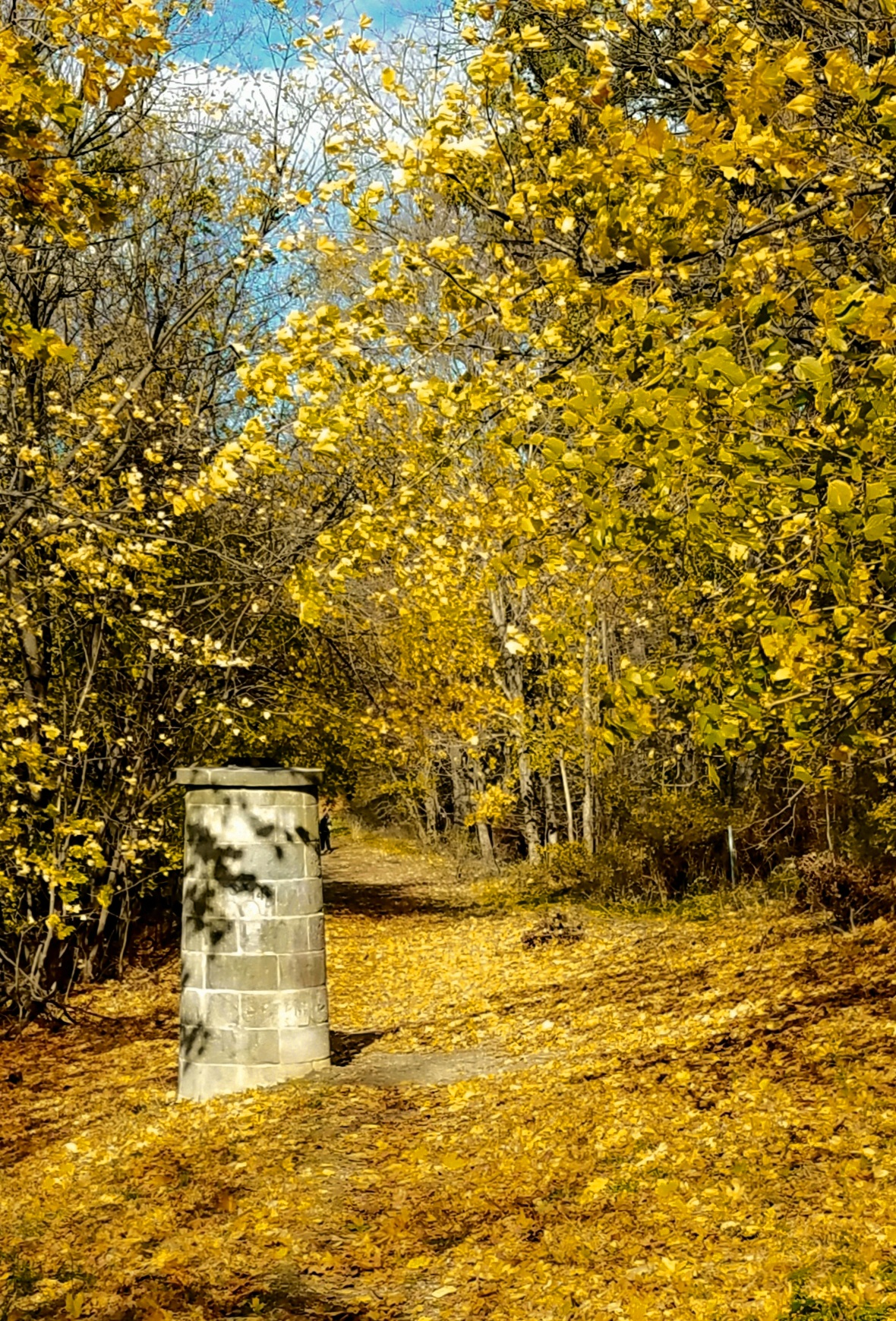
Ventilating tower No. 15, Tarrytown (November 2020)

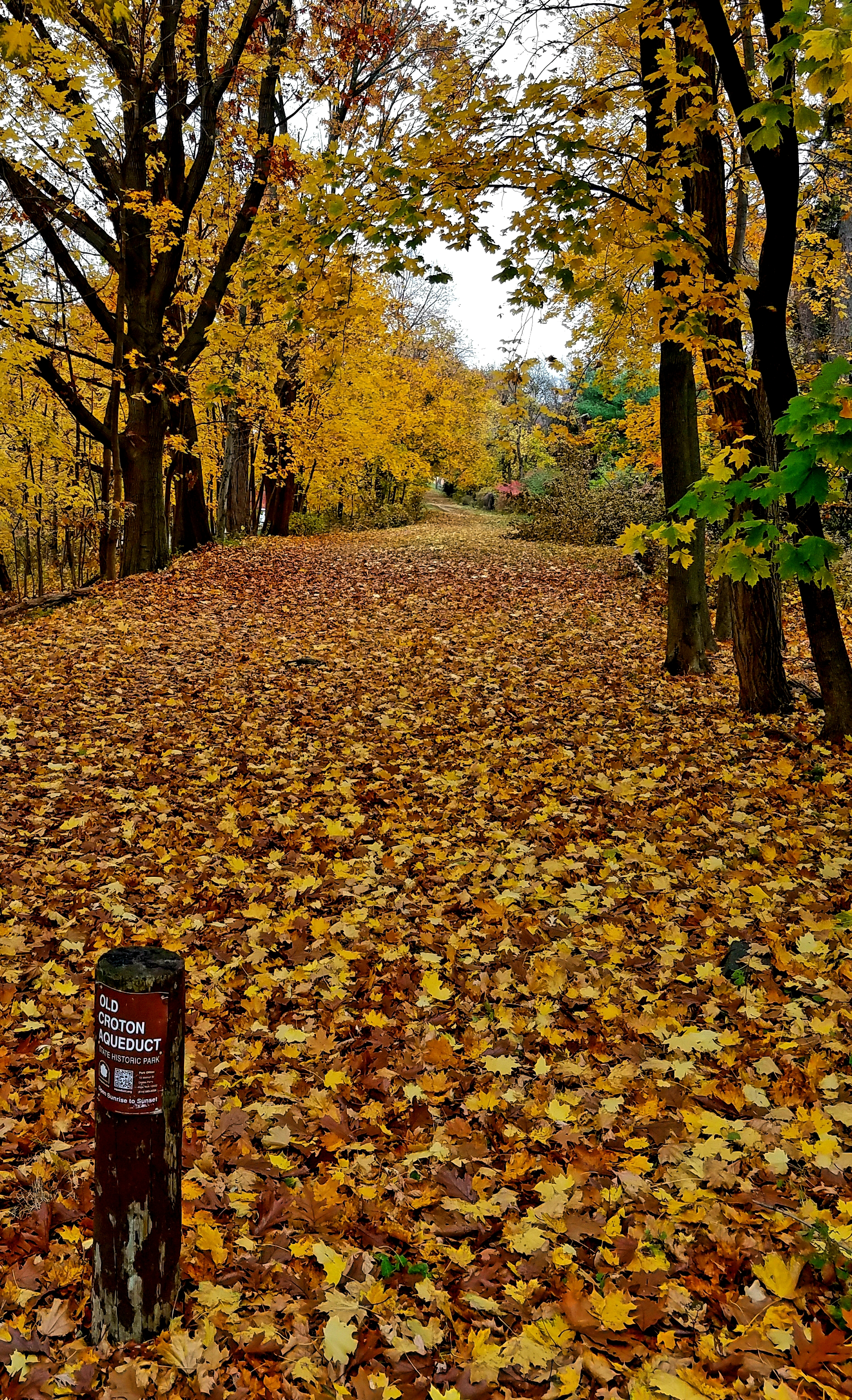
Trail sign marking the Old Croton Aqueduct State Historic Park in Tarrytown

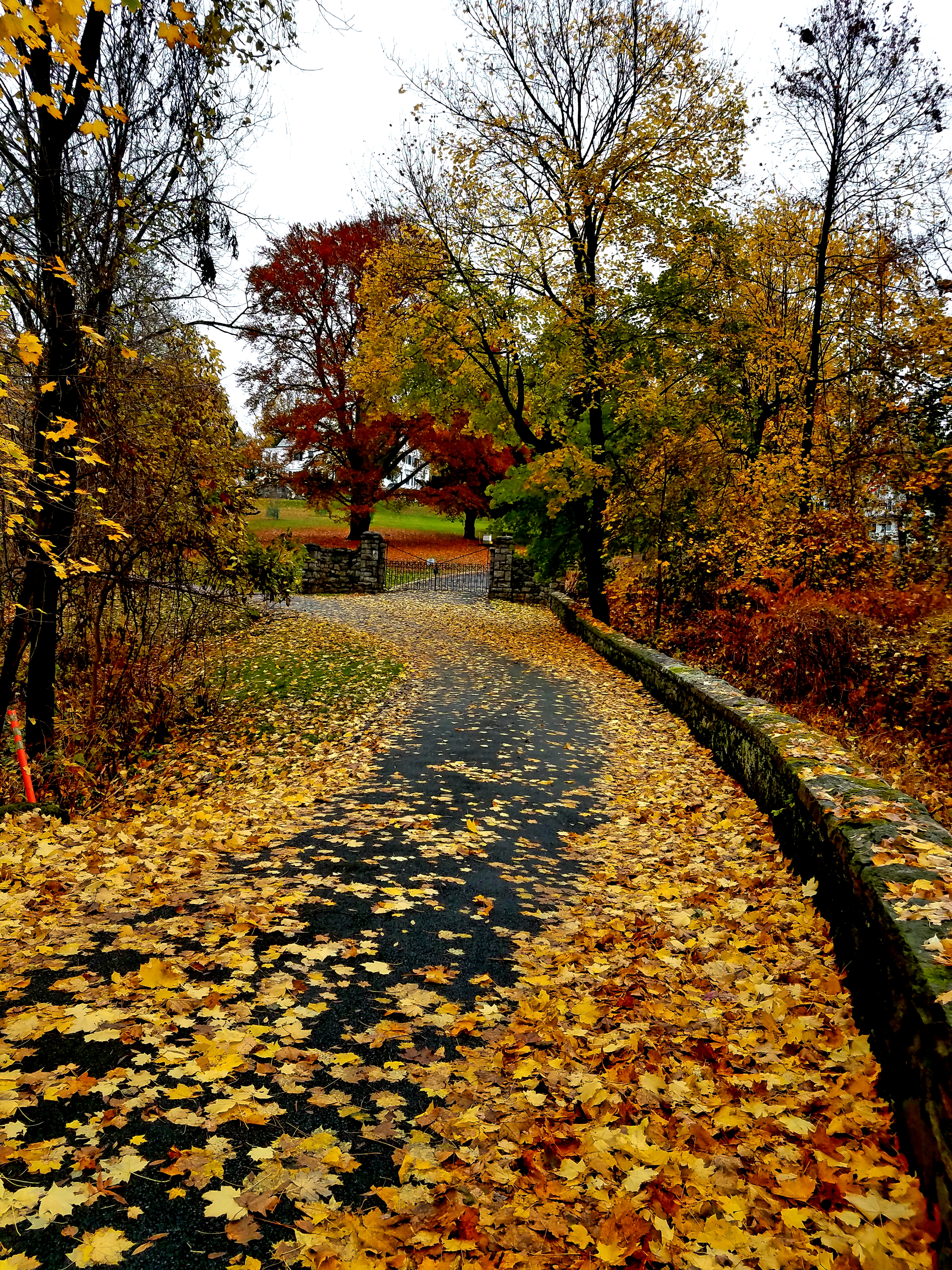
Section of the Old Croton Aqueduct State Historic Park in Sleepy Hollow

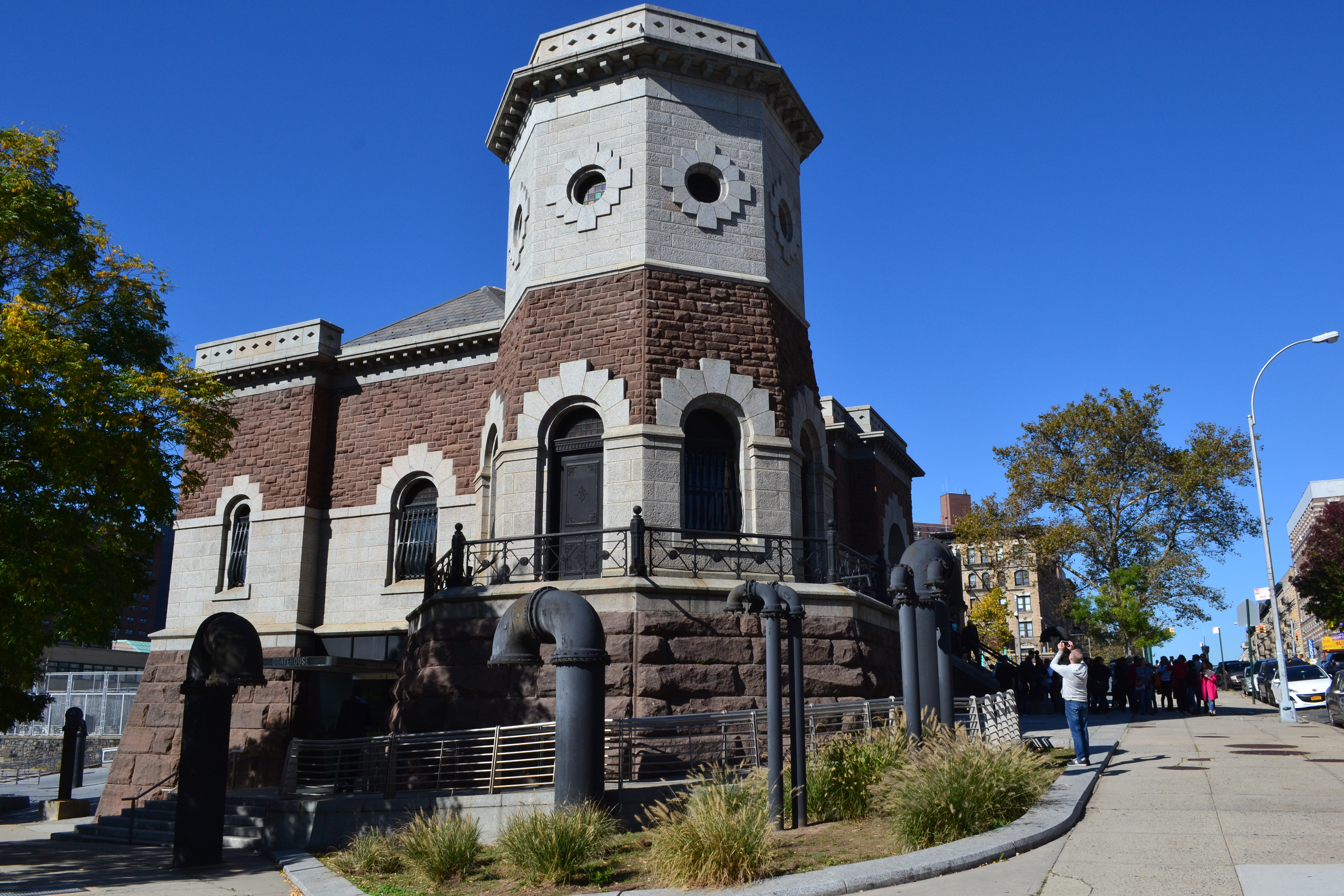
135th St Croton Aqueduct Gatehouse in New York City is listed on the National Register of Historic Places

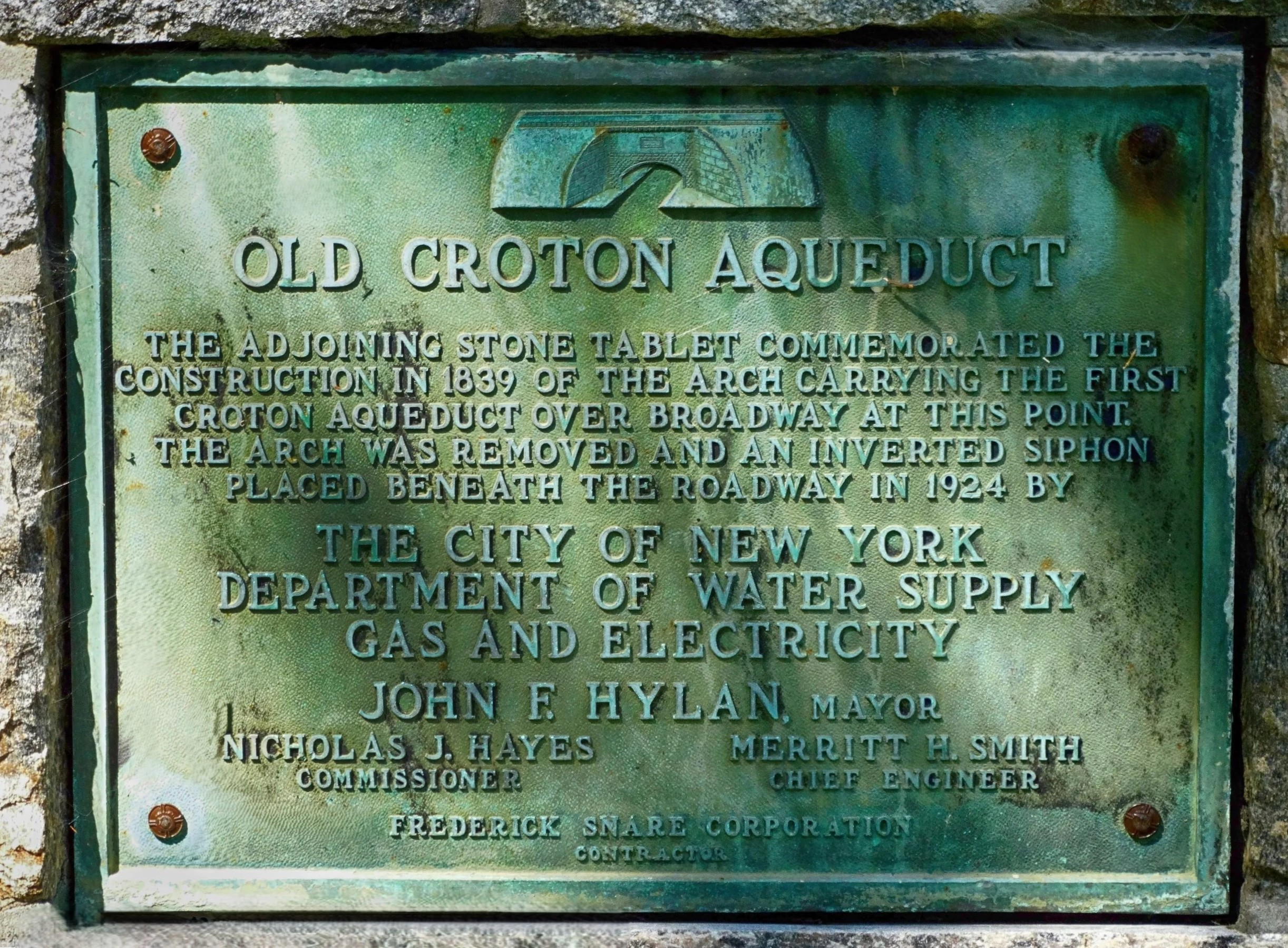
Plaque commemorating the Archville Bridge that carried the Croton Aqueduct over the highway

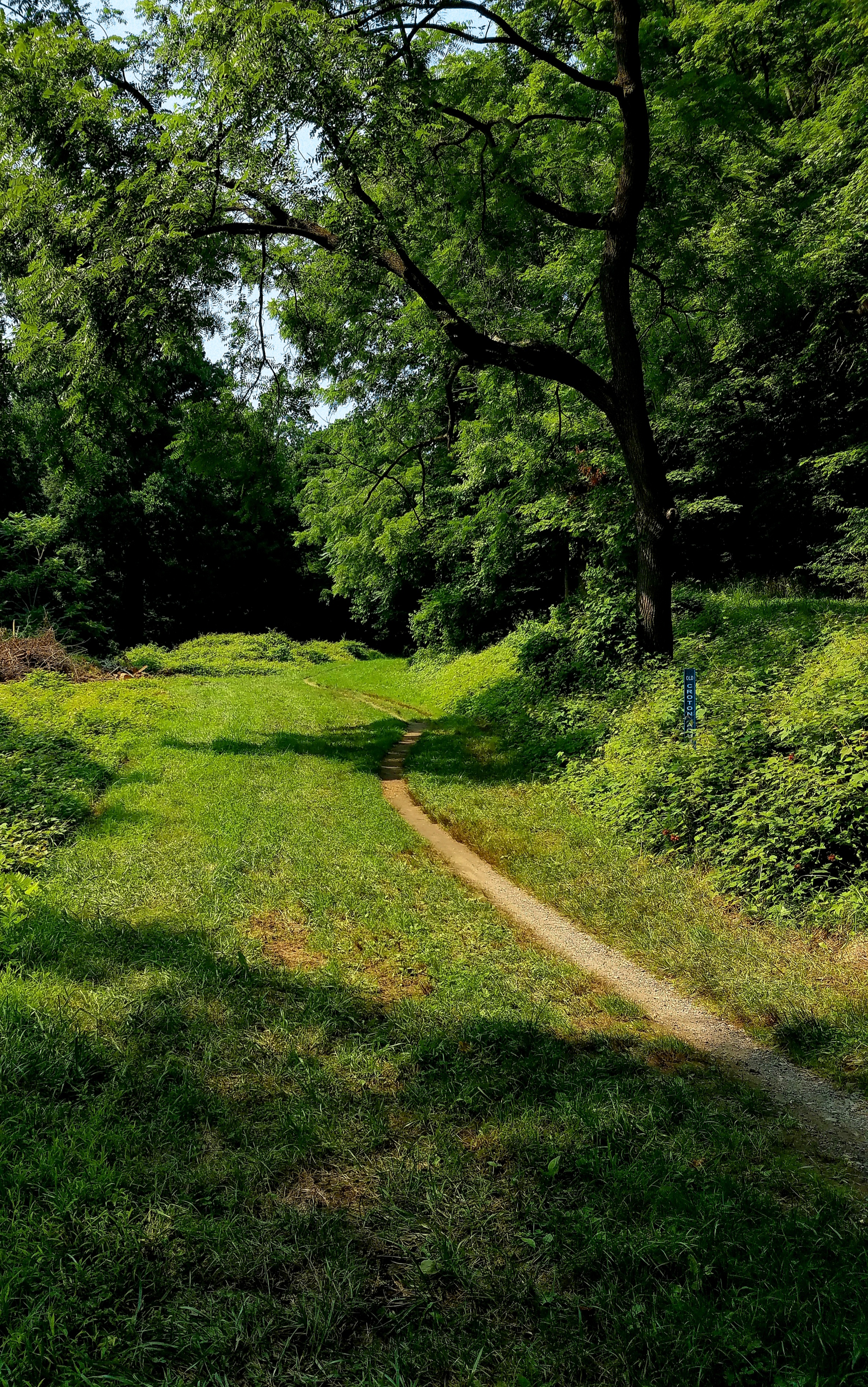
Segment of the Old Croton Trail between Briarcliff Manor and Archville, one of the trail's wooded sections

== See also ==
- Croton Aqueduct Gate House
- List of National Historic Landmarks in New York
- National Register of Historic Places listings in northern Westchester County, New York
- National Register of Historic Places listings in southern Westchester County, New York
- National Register of Historic Places listings in the Bronx
