= Aaron Davis Hall =

Performing arts center

Coordinates: 40°49′03″N 73°57′05″W

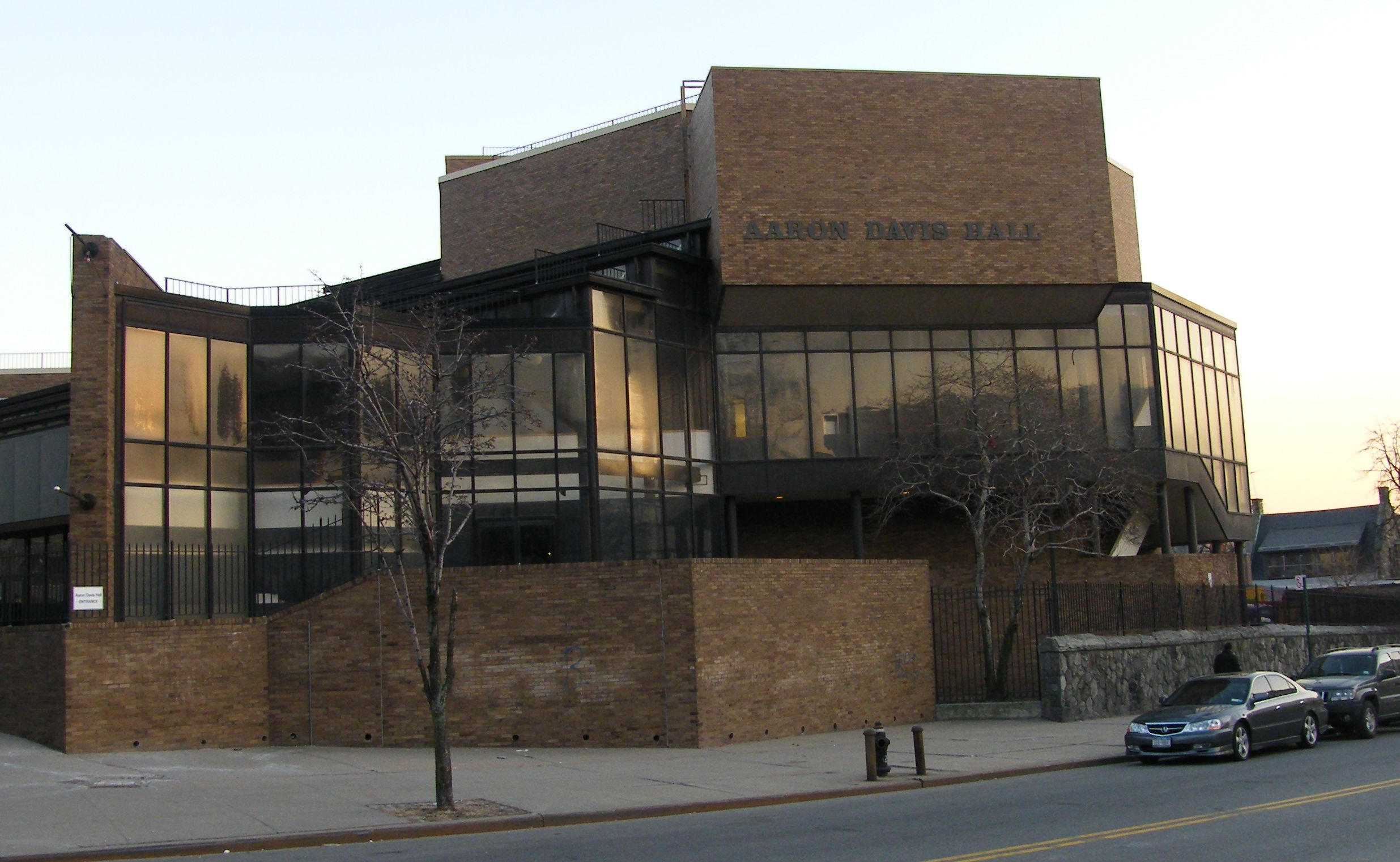
- Interactive map of Aaron Davis Hall
- Address: 160 Convent Ave.
- Location: New York City
- Owner: City College of New York
- Capacity: Marian Anderson Theatre: 750; Theatre B: 250
- Type: Performing arts center
- Public transit: Subway: 135th Street–St. Nicholas Avenue

Construction
- Built: 1974–1979
- Opened: October 24, 1979
- Cost: $5.3 million

Website
- adhatccny.org

Aaron Davis Hall is a performing arts center in Harlem, Manhattan, New York City. It opened in 1979 and is located on the campus of the City College of New York, between West 133rd and 135th Streets on Convent Avenue, one block east of Amsterdam Avenue. It consists of the Marian Anderson Theatre, named after the American contralto, and Theatre B, a black box theater.

== History ==
In 1974, the City College announced plans for the $5.3 million Aaron Davis Hall, which would house the school's Leonard Davis Center for the Performing Arts. The Aaron Davis Hall was opened in 1979 with a concert by many notable artists, such as Mikhail Baryshnikov and Ella Fitzgerald. The architecture received acclaim for its verve and "dignified" style.

In December 1992, the hall underwent a $250,000 renovation, which involved replacing torn carpet, repainting and sprucing up the lobby and backstage areas, and installing a new computerized lighting system and a 40-channel audio system, compared to the old system which only allowed four microphones.

In 2007, it was among over 530 New York City arts and social service institutions to receive part of a $20 million grant from the Carnegie Corporation, which was made possible through a donation by New York City mayor Michael Bloomberg.

== Notable performers and visitors ==
- American Symphony Orchestra
- Mikhail Baryshnikov
- Harry Belafonte
- Ornette Coleman
- Gil Evans
- Suzanne Farrell
- Ella Fitzgerald
- Freddie Hubbard
- Bill T. Jones
- Alicia Keys
- Ted Koppel
- David Letterman
- Nelson Mandela
- Patricia McBride
- Barack Obama
- Paul Smith Trio
- Max Roach
- Carl Hancock Rux
- Nancy Wilson
- Lillias White

== See also ==
- Music of New York City
- List of museums and cultural institutions in New York City
- Croton Aqueduct Gate House
