= Croton Distributing Reservoir =

Former reservoir in New York City

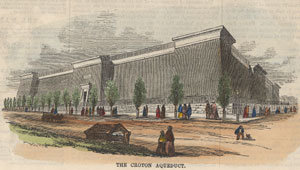
- Granite walls surrounded the above-ground reservoir

- Location within Manhattan Location within New York City Location within New York
- Interactive map of Croton Distributing Reservoir
- Location: 42nd Street and Fifth Avenue; Manhattan, New York
- Coordinates: 40°45′12″N 73°58′57″W
- Type: Reservoir
- Etymology: Croton River
- River sources: Croton River
- Basin countries: United States
- Built: May 1837
- Construction engineer: James Renwick Jr. John B. Jervis; Thomas Price & Son
- First flooded: July 4, 1842
- Surface area: 4 acres (16,000 m^{2})
- Water volume: 20 million US gallons (76,000 m^{3})

The Croton Distributing Reservoir, also known as the Murray Hill Reservoir, was an above-ground reservoir at 42nd Street and Fifth Avenue in the New York City borough of Manhattan. Covering 4 acres (16,000 m^{2}) and holding 20 million US gallons (76,000 m^{3}), it supplied the city with drinking water during the 19th century. Its massive 50-foot-high (15 m) granite walls, which presented a vaguely Egyptian-style facade, were 25 feet (7.6 m) thick. Atop the walls was a public promenade offering panoramic views; Edgar Allan Poe enjoyed walking there.

== History ==
The Croton Aqueduct was New York City's foremost water source when it was established. Construction began in May 1837, and filling began July 4, 1842, amidst great fanfare. Prior to the aqueduct's construction, water had been obtained from cisterns, wells and barrels from rain. The aqueduct and reservoir obtained their names from the water's source, a series of mostly underground conduits that brought water from the Croton River in northern Westchester County to New York City's spigots.

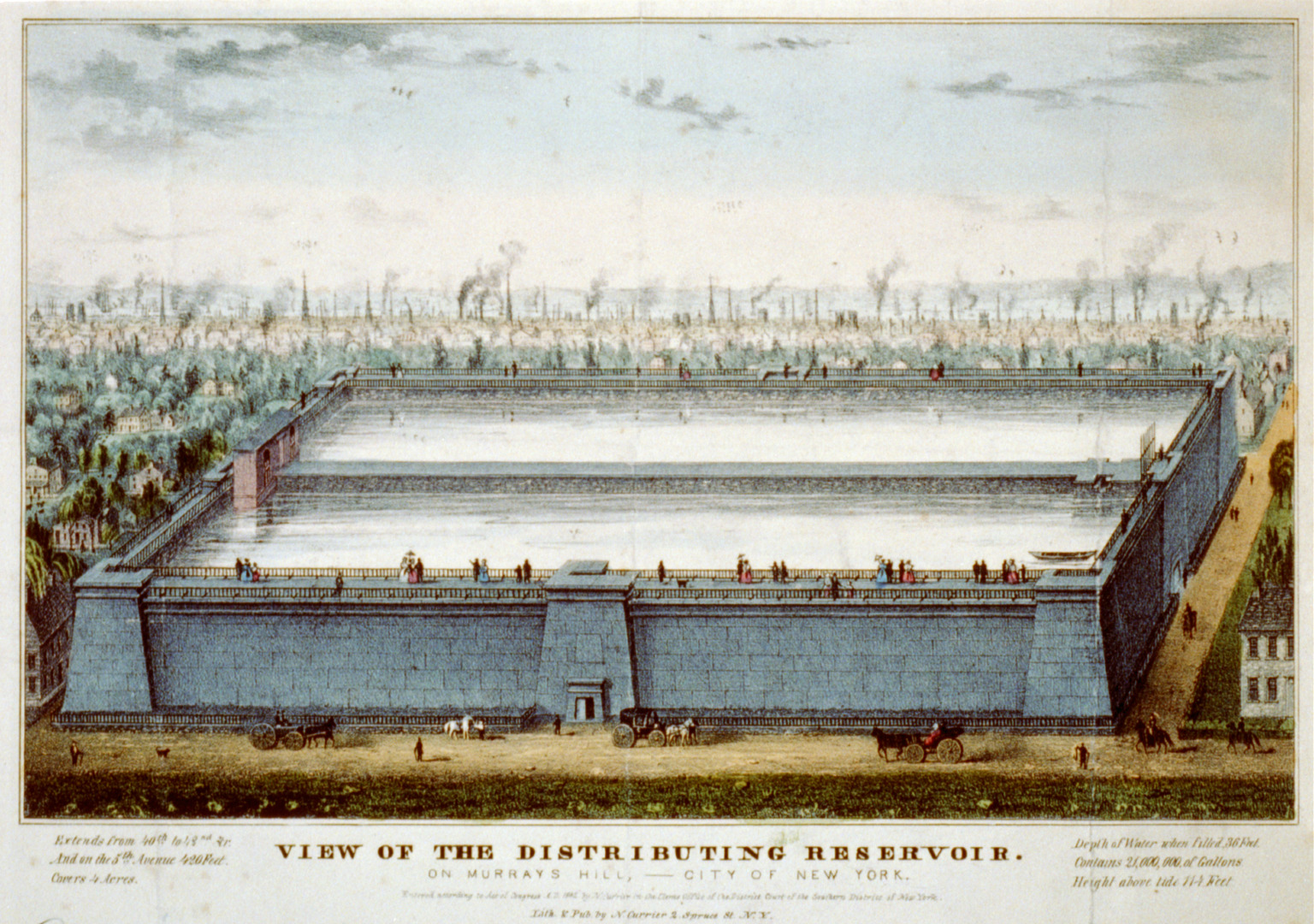
A lithograph of the reservoir, 1842

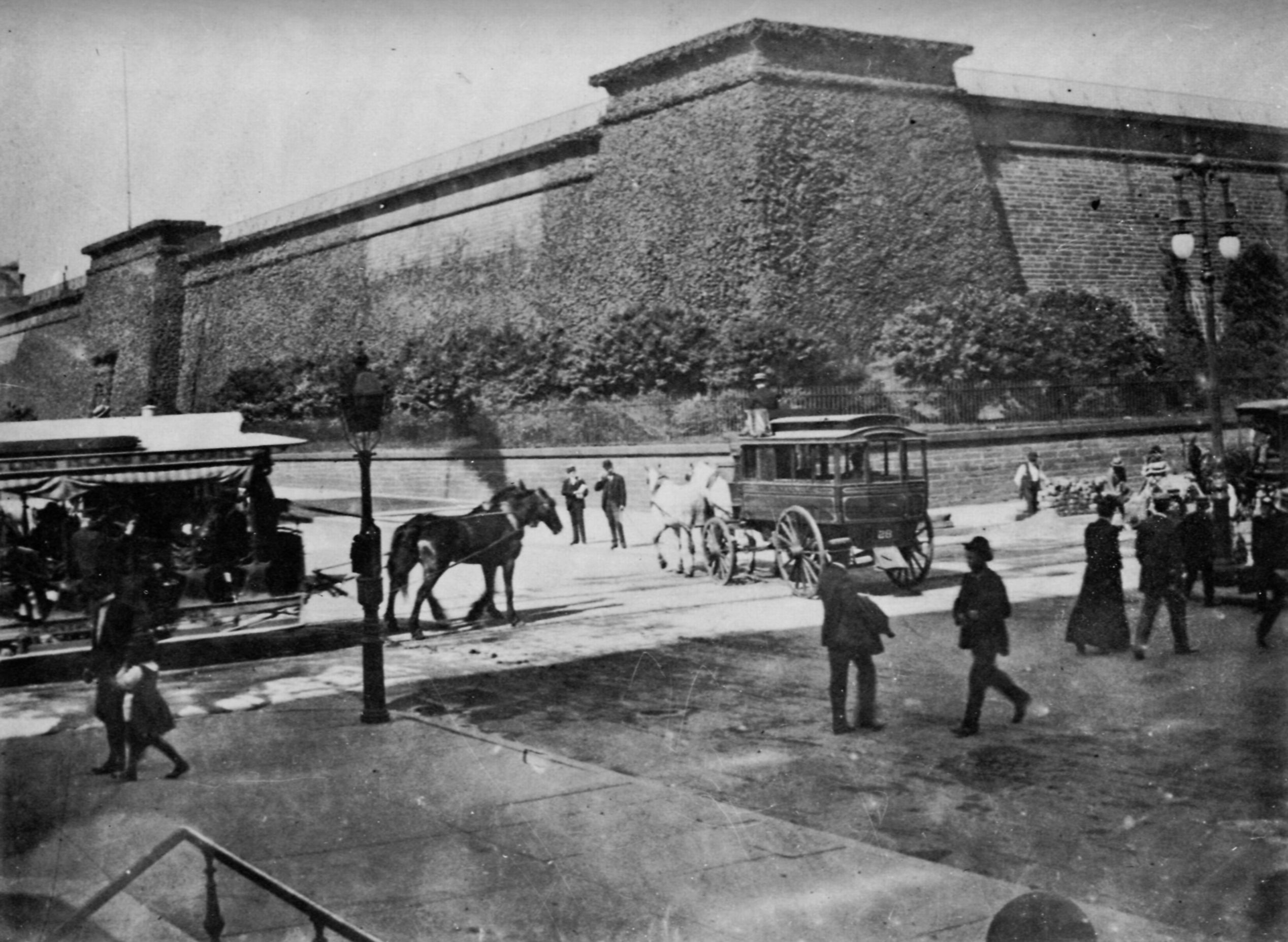
The reservoir, 1875

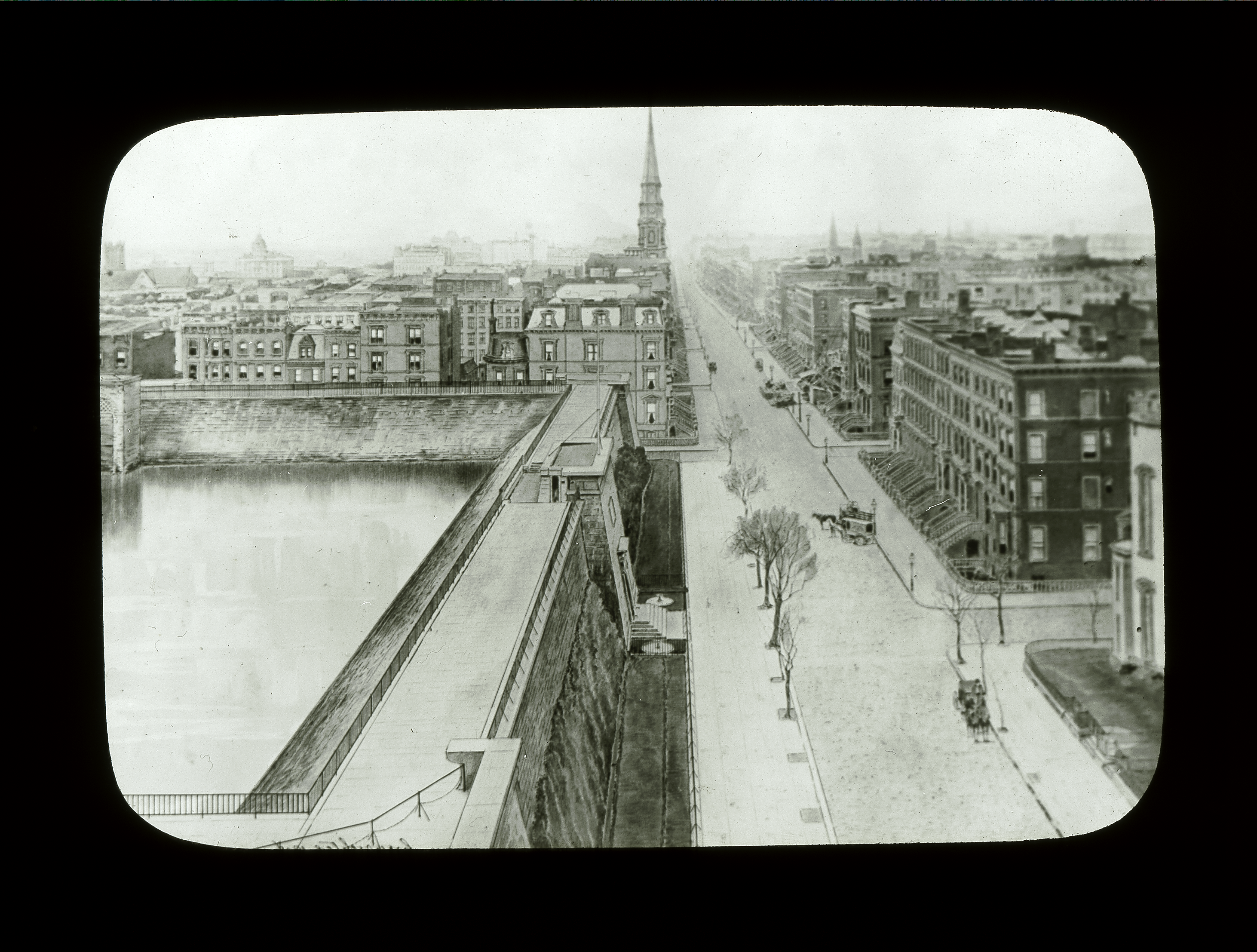
The reservoir, Fifth Avenue, 1879, looking north

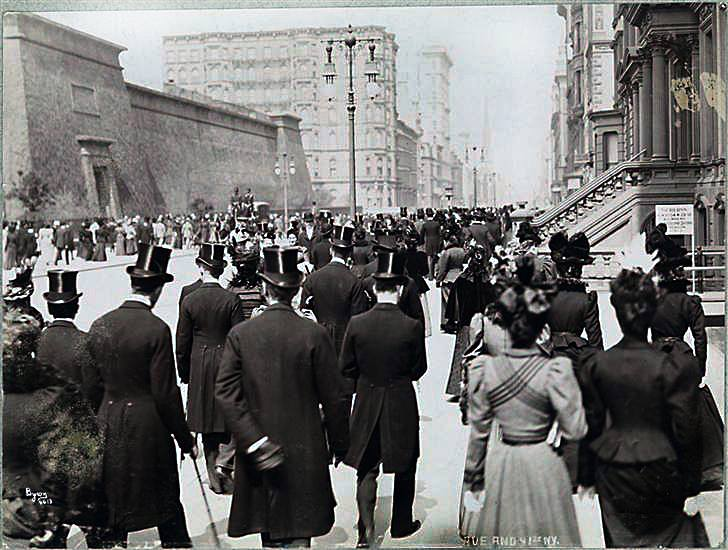
The reservoir, in a photo of the Easter Parade on Fifth Avenue, 1897

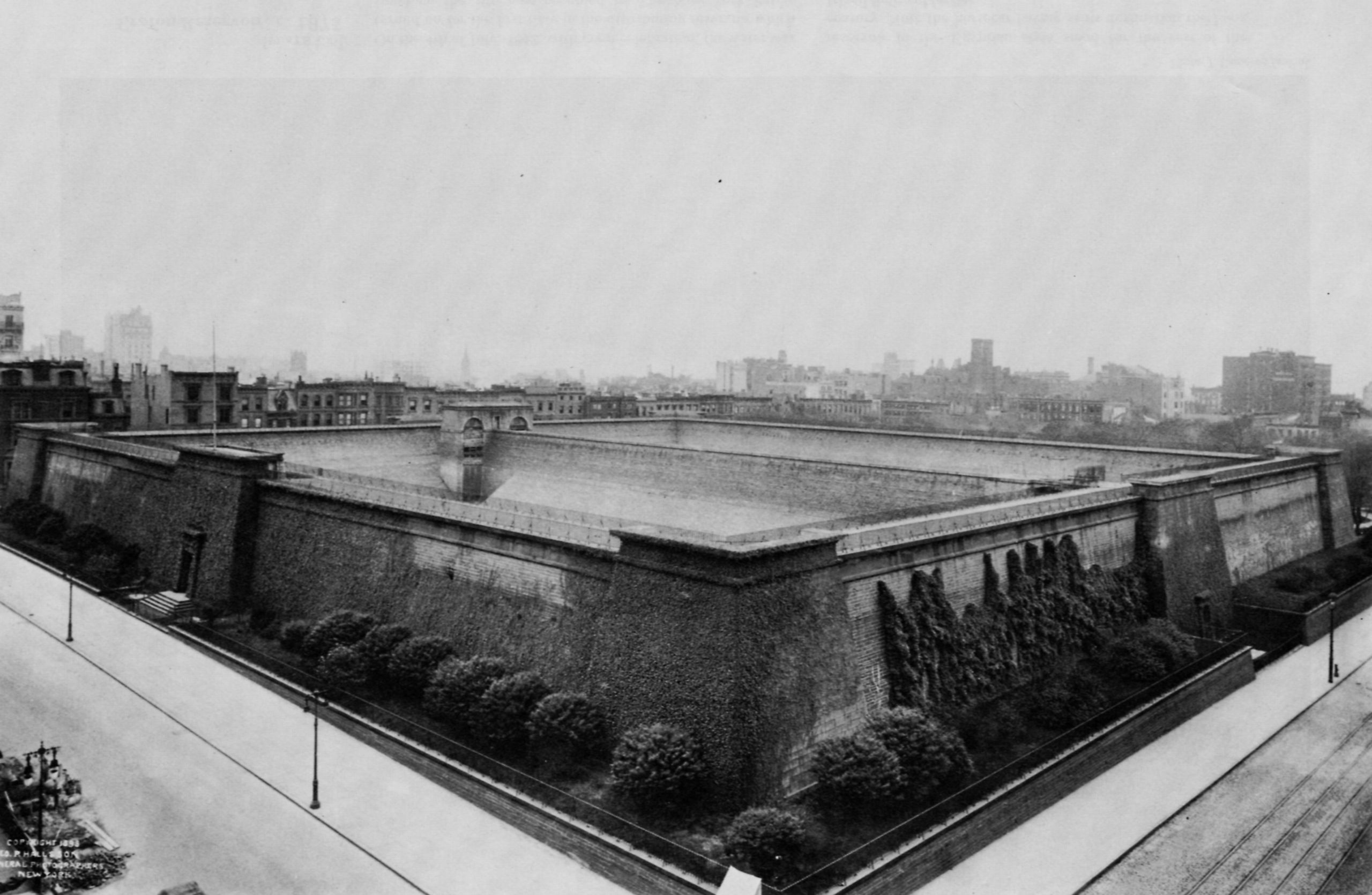
The reservoir, 1898

=== Demolition ===
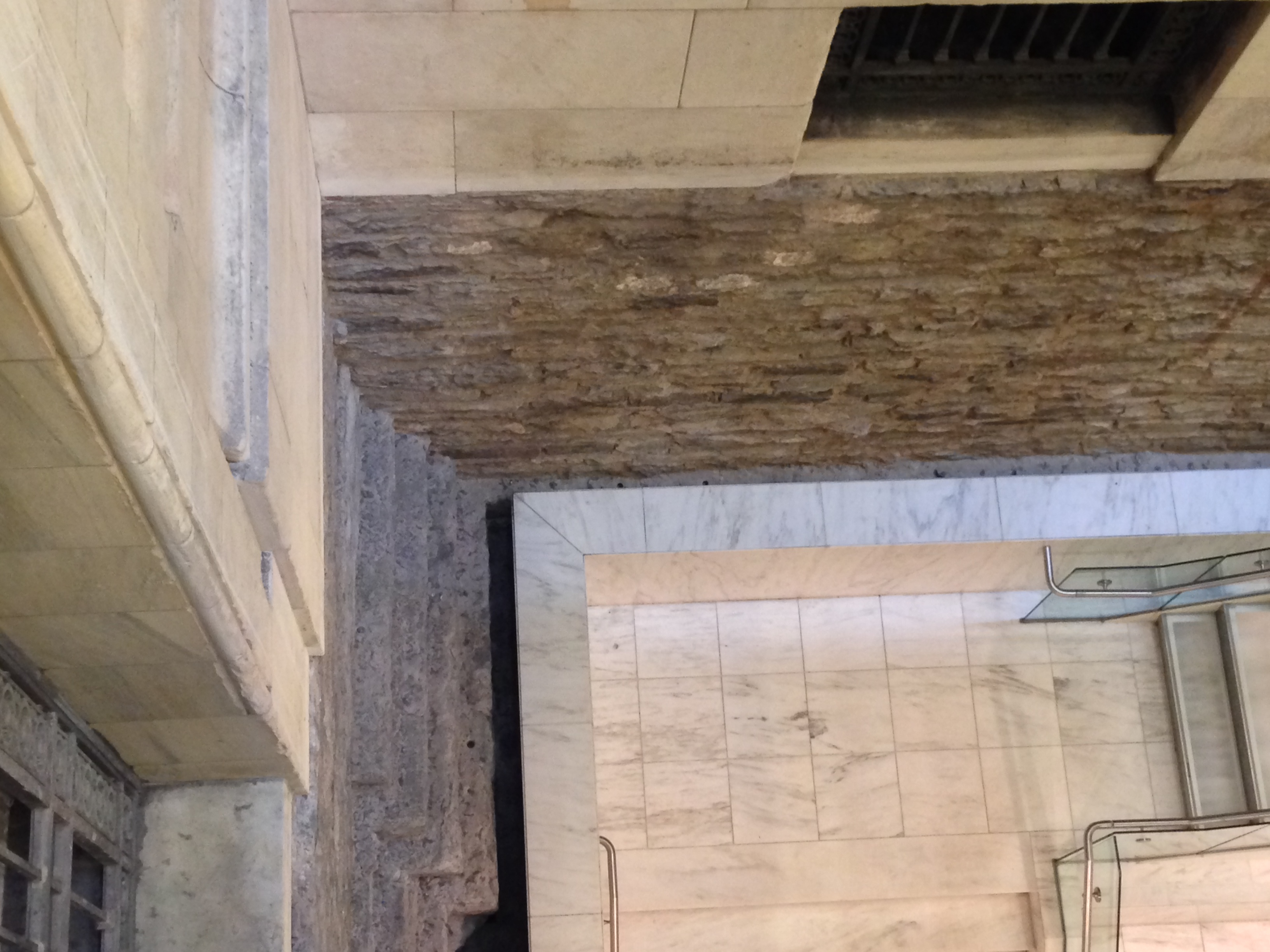
A remnant of the reservoir can be seen today in the foundation of the South Court of the New York Public Library Main Branch.

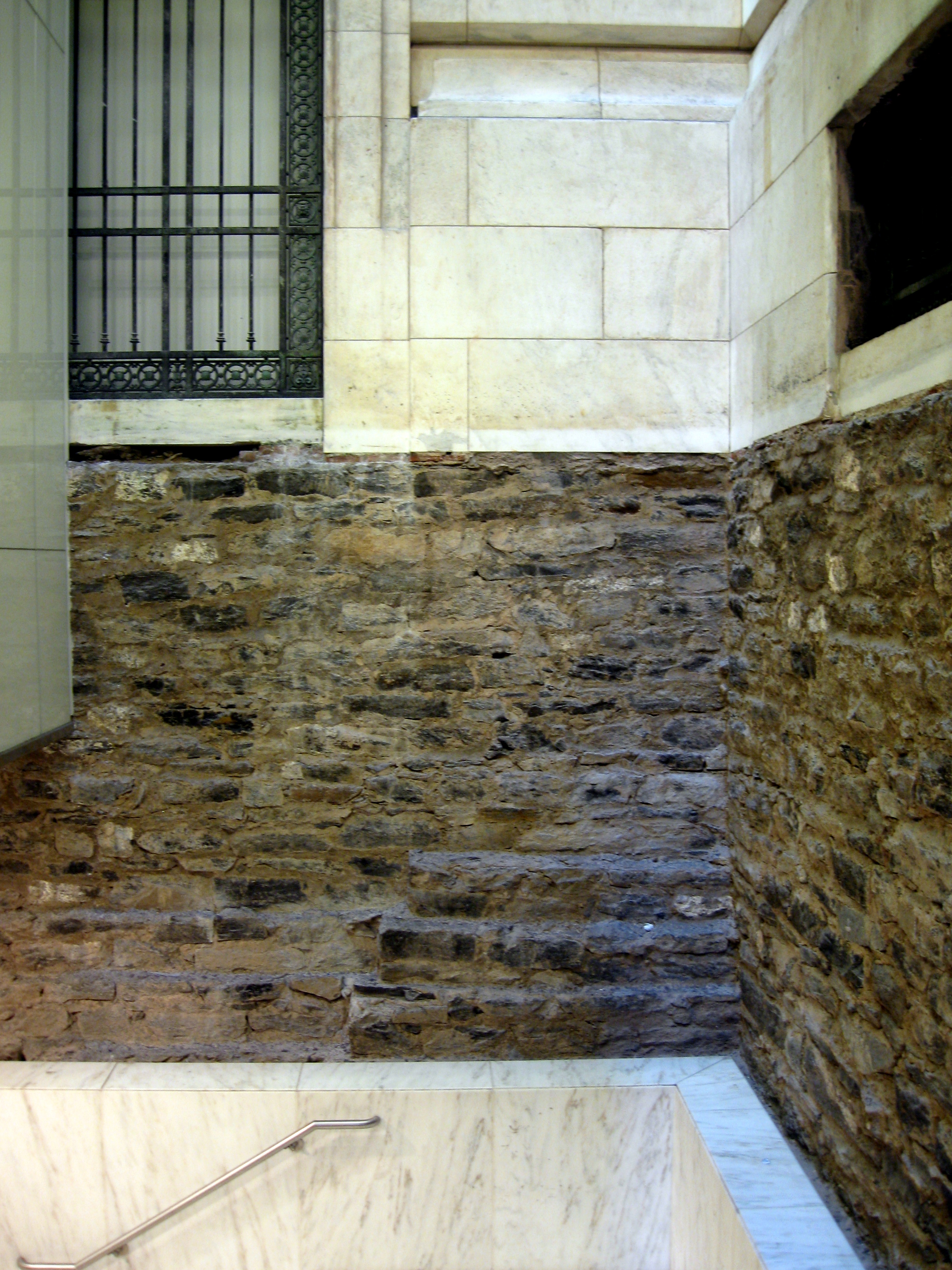
Vestiges of the Croton Distributing Reservoir embedded in the foundation of the New York Public Library Main Branch

The reservoir was torn down in the 1890s. Today, the Main Branch of the New York Public Library, located in the eastern portion of Bryant Park, stands at that location. Some of the reservoir's original foundation can still be found in the South Court at the Main Branch. Today water is primarily supplied to New York City via its three city water tunnels. The decommissioned Central Park Reservoir still remains, but has not operated as part of the Croton Aqueduct system since 1993.

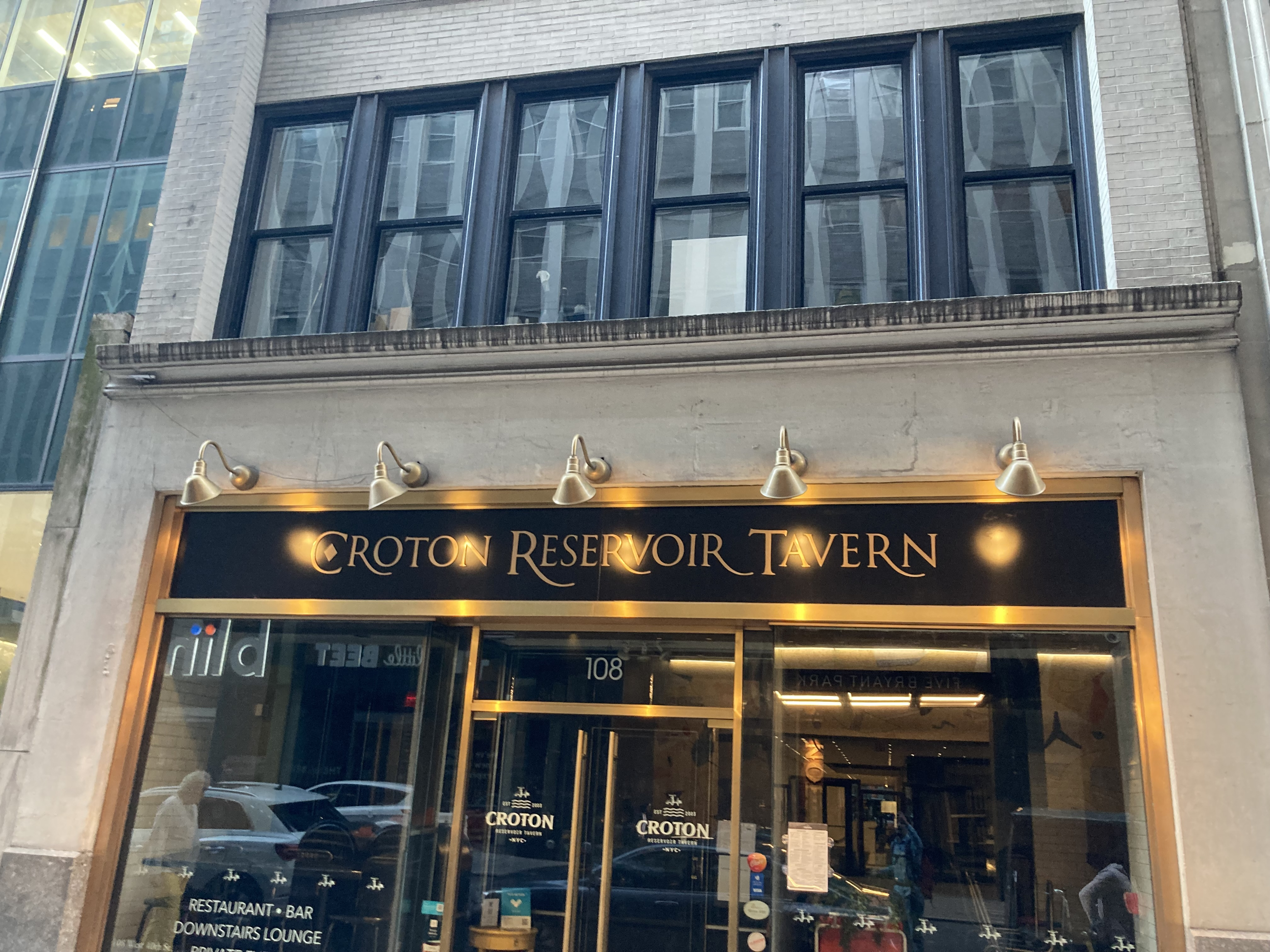
Croton Reservoir Tavern near Bryant Park referencing the reservoir’s history.

Subway commuters can see historical photographs showing the former reservoir. The display is located on the wall in the underground passageway that connects the Fifth Avenue station on the New York City Subway's IRT Flushing Line (7 and <7> trains) and the 42nd Street–Bryant Park station on the IND Sixth Avenue Line (B, D, F, <F>, and M trains). A few years before the reservoir was torn down, there were two tablets affixed to the Reservoir. The inscription was:

HISTORICAL AND DESCRIPTIVE ACCOUNT OF THE CROTON AQUEDUCT – The Law authorizing the construction of the work, passed May 2nd, 1834. Stephen Allen, William W. Fox, Saul Alley, Charles Dusenberry and Benjamin M. Brown were appointed Commissioners. During the year 1834, two surveys were made—one by DAVID B. DOUGLASS and the other by JOHN MARTINEAU. In April, 1835, a majority of the Electors of the City voted in favour of constructing the Aqueduct. On the 7th May following, the _Common Council_ "instructed the Commissioners to proceed with the work." David B. Douglass was employed as Chief Engineer until October, 1836; when he was succeeded by John B. Jervis. In March, 1837, Benjamin M. Brown resigned, and was succeeded by Thomas T. Woodruff. In March, 1840, the before mentioned Commissioners were succeeded by Samuel Stevens, John D. Ward, Zevedee Ring, Benjamin Birdsall and Samuel R. Childs. The work was commenced in May, 1837. On the 22nd June, 1842, the Aqueduct was so far completed that it received the Water from the Croton River Lake; on the 27th the Water entered the Receiving Reservoir and was admitted into this Reservoir on the succeeding 4th of July. The DAM at the Croton River is 40 feet high, and the overfall 251 feet in length. The CROTON RIVER LAKE is five miles long, and covers an area of 400 acres. The AQUEDUCT, from the DAM to this Reservoir, is 40½ miles long, and will deliver in twenty-four hours 60,000,000 imperial gallons. The capacity of the Receiving Reservoir is 150,000,000 gallons, and of this reservoir 20,000,000. The cost, to and including this Reservoir, nearly $9,000,000.

The second tablet stated:

CROTON AQUEDUCT – DISTRIBUTING RESERVOIR – COMMISSIONERS:

SAMUEL STEVENS
ZEBEDEE RING
JOHN D. WARD
BENJ^{n} BIRDSALL
SAMUEL R. CHILDS

ENGINEERS:

JOHN B. JERVIS. CHIEF.
H^{o} ALLEN, PRIN^{l} ASSIST.
P. HASTIE, RESIDENT.

BUILDERS:

THOMSON PRICE & SON.

COMMENCED A. D. MDCCCXXXVIII.

COMPLETED A. D. MDCCCXLII.
