= Croton Aqueduct Gate House =

- U.S. National Register of Historic Places
- New York City Landmark
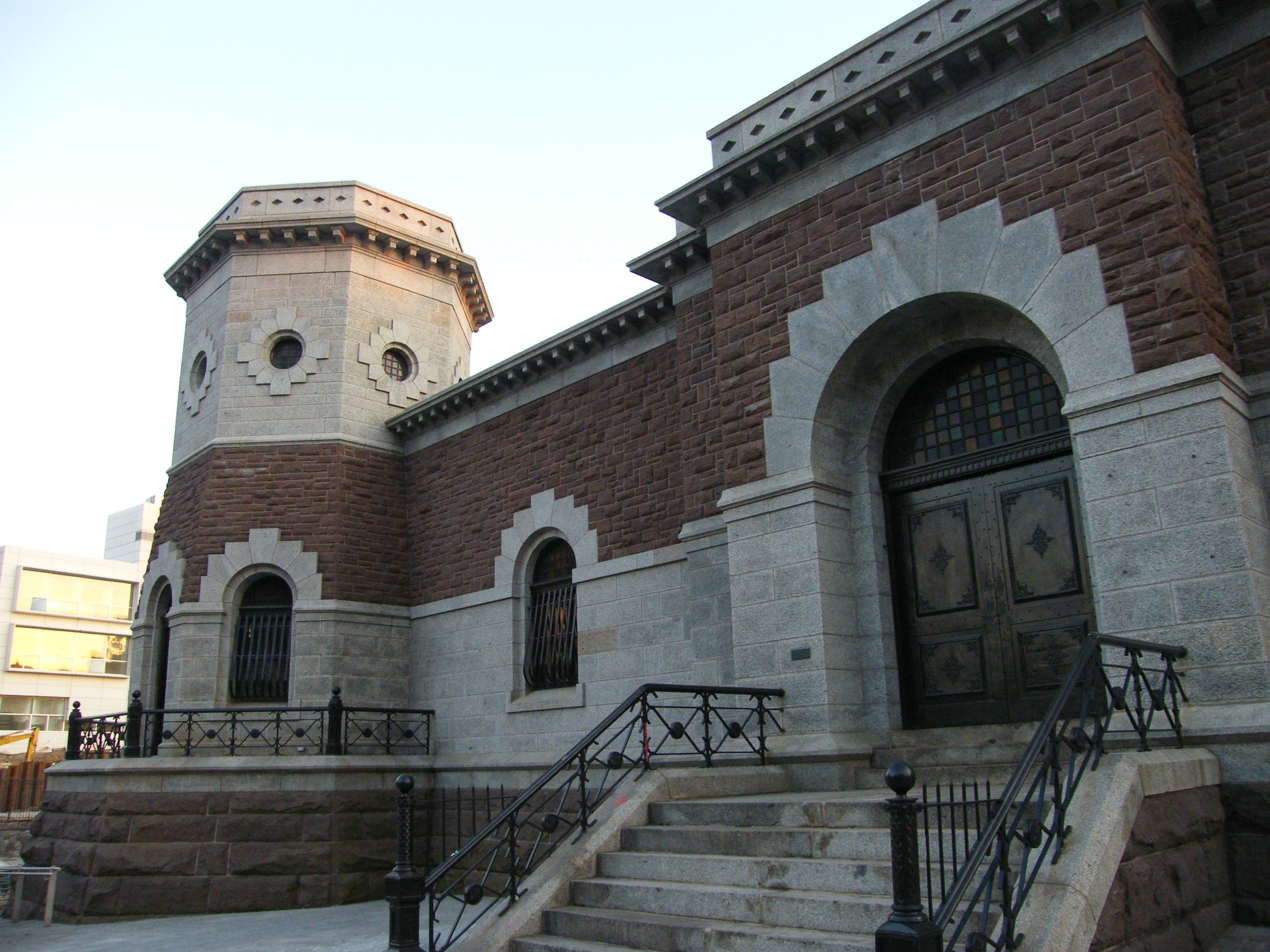
- Croton Aqueduct Gate House in 2009.

- Location within New York City Location within New York Location within the United States
- Location: 135th Street and Convent Avenue, New York, New York
- Coordinates: 40°49′6″N 73°57′6″W
- Area: less than one acre
- Built: 1884
- Architect: Cook, Frederick S.
- Architectural style: Romanesque, Romanesque Revival
- NRHP reference No.: 83001721
- NYCL No.: 1035

Significant dates
- Added to NRHP: September 22, 1983
- Designated NYCL: March 23, 1981

The Croton Aqueduct Gate House is located in Manhattanville, Manhattan, New York City, New York. The building was built in 1884 and was added to the National Register of Historic Places on September 22, 1983. After being decommissioned in 1984, the below-grade valve chambers were filled and the building sat empty for nearly two decades. Between 2004 and 2006, Ohlhausen DuBois Architects oversaw an adaptive reuse project converting the gate house into theater space for Harlem Stage/Aaron Davis Hall.

== See also ==
- National Register of Historic Places listings in Manhattan above 110th Street
- List of New York City Designated Landmarks in Manhattan above 110th Street
