= North American Trust Company =

One of a succession of large New York trust companies (1896–1905)

- Type: Trust company
- Founded: 1896
- Fate: Acquired by Trust Company of America in 1905
- Successor: Trust Company of America
- Headquarters: Corner of Broadway and Cedar Street, Manhattan, New York City, United States
- Key people: Oakleigh Thorne (president)

The North American Trust Company was a trust company based in New York City. It was organized in early 1896. At the start of 1898, the company was located in the American Surety Building at 100 Broadway. On April 3, 1900, the directors of the International Banking and Trust Company and the North American Trust Company unanimously voted to merge the two organizations under the new name the North American Trust Company. Other organizations were acquired in 1901, and in 1905 the City Trust, the North American Trust, and the Trust Company of America merged in what the Times called "the most important trust company consolidation of recent years." The new company was named the Trust Company of America.

== History ==
=== 1886–1899: Founding and branches ===
There was a North American Trust Company involved in litigation as of 1852 in Albany, New York.

The North American Trust Company was organized in early 1886, with a capital of $1 million. At the end of 1897, the company report announced that it had resources of about $5.5 million, an increase from about $5.1 at the end of 1896. At the start of 1898, the company was located in the American Surety Building at 100 Broadway. On January 19, 1898, Colonel William L. Trenholm was elected president of the North American Trust Company. Former president Samuel M. Jarvis resigned and it was announced he would "devote himself more especially to the international business of the company." The company at large announced it would be more active with expansion, both in the United States and Europe.

In July 1898 the North American Trust Company agreed to advance money for individuals connected with the New York Soldiers’ and Sailors’ Families’ Protective Association to buy up to $500 worth of United States war bonds, the families being paid the interest on the bonds. The company obtained about 1,000 subscriptions amounting to $500,000 and paid the families nearly $24,000 in interest. A later government inquiry discovered that the company had falsified hundreds of the subscription forms in order to draw interest for itself. This fact was made public in the autumn of 1898, even though neither Samuel M. Jarvis nor any of the company's directors were directly blamed. Prior to the irregularities coming to light, the subscription scheme had earned favourable publicity because of its apparent support of military families. As historian Peter James Hudson has pointed out, this activity led U.S. President William McKinley to offer Jarvis the post of United States fiscal agent in Cuba.

In July 1898, Samuel M. Jarvis set up a bank branch in Santiago de Cuba and opened another one in Havana that autumn. Most of the company's early activities in Cuba concerned government business, including receiving deposits of customs revenue, paying military expenses, and collecting taxes. The company also offered foreign exchange and remittance services, but at first followed a cautious policy with regard to lending and did not grant loans secured by real estate. Jarvis obtained more government business by appealing to Wager Swayne, one of the company's directors, and to Abner McKinley, the president's brother. An investigation launched by the U.S. Comptroller of the Currency in March 1899 discovered that the company had been charging unauthorized fees for discounting government bills. The comptroller then instructed the company to stop this practice and to reimburse the people who had paid the extra charges.

By May 1899, vice presidents Jarvis and Roland R. Conklin were the primary stockholders of the company. The company also had a branch in London.

=== 1900–1904: Acquisition spree ===
On April 3, 1900, the directors of the International Banking and Trust Company and the North American Trust Company met separately. Both groups unanimously voted to merge the two organizations under the new name the North American Trust Company. The new North American Trust Company would be based in the corner of Broadway and Cedar Street, formerly secured by the International Company. At the time of the vote, North American had a capital of $2 million and a surplus of $1 million. International, on the other hand, had capital of $1 million and a surplus of $500,000. In the merger, the International Company surrendered its charter and all its assets to North American, with the new capital stock of the company to be $2 million, with entire assets of something over $4,500,000. A date was set for two weeks later, to ratify the director vote. On April 3, seven men from the International Banking and Trust Company were elected as directors of the North American company. They included president Oakleigh Thorne of the International.

On May 22, 1900, the Senate adopted a resolution brought by Jones of Arkansas directing the Secretary of War to investigate the North American Trust Company's operations in Havana, and its relation to the United States government.

In late February 1901, the North American Trust Company "practically absorbed eight other companies." By February 27, 1901, negotiations were taking place for the North American to take control of two other trust companies, with plans to liquidate their businesses: the Holland Trust Company and the Century Trust Company. Oakleigh Thorne was serving as president of the North American.

=== 1905: Acquisition by Trust Company of America ===
On April 12, 1905, it was reported that the City Trust, the North American Trust, and the Trust Company of America were merging in the near future, in what the Times called "the most important trust company consolidation of recent years." It was announced the new company would be named the Trust Company of America, with capital of $2 million, a surplus of $9 million, and deposits over $50 million, "putting it among the strongest trust companies in New York." Thorne, then president of the North American Trust Company, was announced as the architect of the merger.

To facilitate the merger, Thorne employed a corporation to hold a majority of the stocks, with the Times writing that "Wall Street had never seen the idea applied to the control of banking institutions." Thorne and his associates formed the Broadway Securities Company to hold a majority of the stocks from the North American and the Trust Company of America "against the efforts of the minority interests" endeavoring to block the consolidation. Stock in all three companies was also placed under the control of a committee, consisting of Charles T. Barney, George R. Sheldon, Hosmer B. Parsons, Emerson McMillin, Oakleigh Thorne, and William H. Leupp. A vote to ratify the merger was called for April 18, 1905.

== Directors and executives ==
On January 19, 1898, Colonel William L. Trenholm was elected president of the North American Trust Company, succeeding Samuel M. Jarvis. Vice presidents elected included Henry D. Lyman, David B. Sickels, and R. A. C. Smith. Former president resigned. At the same election, the elected members of the executive committee included Wiliam A. Wheelock, Henry H. Cook, Thomas F. Ryan, James A. Hayden, Marcellus Hartley, John C. Bullitt, John J. McCook, Elihu Root, and W. B. Kendall.

By May 1899, vice presidents Samuel M. Jarvis and Roland R. Conklin were also serving on the board. The company also had directors such as John G. Carlisle, Adlai E. Stevenson, and Wager Swayne.

In 1899, William Lee Trenholm desired to be "free of business cares" and retire, and an election was held for a new president at 100 Broadway. On May 26, 1899, Alvah Trowbridge was elected as the new president of the company, succeeding Trenholm. Trowbridge to that point had been vice president of the National Bank of North America.

On April 3, seven men from the International Banking and Trust Company were elected as directors of the North American company. They included president Oakleigh Thorne of the International, as well as Benjamin F. Tracy, H. B. Hollins, Edward W. Scott, Jone Hone, John C. Tomlinson, and Ernst Thalmann.

== See also ==
- List of bank mergers
