= Ashbel P. Fitch =

American politician (1848–1904)

Ashbel Parmelee Fitch
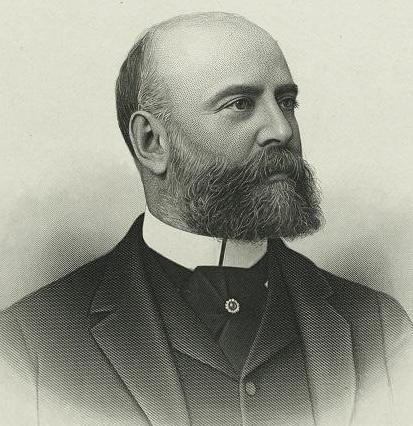

Member of the U.S. House of Representatives from New York
- In office March 4, 1887 – December 26, 1893
- Preceded by: Egbert L. Viele
- Succeeded by: Isidor Straus
- Constituency: 13th district (1887–1893); 15th district (1893)

Personal details
- Born: October 8, 1848 Mooers, New York
- Died: May 4, 1904 (aged 55) New York City
- Resting place: Woodlawn Cemetery
- Party: Republican Democratic
- Occupation: Politician, businessperson

Ashbel Parmelee Fitch (October 8, 1848 – May 4, 1904) was an American lawyer, financier, and politician. He was a four-term Congressman, and a one-term Comptroller of New York City.

From March 4, 1887, until January 30, 1894, he served as U.S. Representative from New York. In Congress, he worked to have New York City selected for the 1892 World Exposition. He also defended immigrant rights and supported tariff reform, urging the passage of the Mills Tariff Reform Bill. He served as chairman of the Committee on Private Land Claims and the Committee on Election of President, Vice President, and Representatives.

Founding president of the Trust Company of America in 1899, he remained president upon his death in May 1904. He was also a director of companies such as the American Light and Traction Company and the Lion Brewery.

== Early life and education ==
Ashbel Parmelee Fitch was born in Mooers, New York. On both his father's and mother's side, he was descended from Revolutionary ancestors and was also a descendant of William Bradford. He moved to New York City with his parents while young. He attended the public schools of New York, including Grammar School No. 35, a public school in Lower Manhattan. He prepared for college at Williston Seminary in Easthampton, Massachusetts, before spending several years at the Universities of Jena and Berlin in Germany. At the University of Jena, he joined the prestigious student society Corps Franconia Jena. Afterwards he took a course at Columbia Law School in New York City.

== Career ==
=== 1869-1880s: Early litigation ===
At the age of 21, he was admitted to the bar in November 1869, initially practicing law in New York City.

=== 1884-1893: Public life and Congress ===
He entered public life in 1884, when the Republicans offered him the nomination for Congress for his home district. However, he declined, as he was not in agreement with the high-tariff doctrines of his party. After accepting the Republican nomination in 1887, Fitch was elected as a Republican to the Fiftieth Congress and served from March 4, 1887. In the House, he supported New York City and tariff reform, and worked to have New York City selected for the 1892 World Exposition. He also defended immigrant rights. In May 1888, he gave a speech "which attracted national attention" when he urged for the passage of the Mills Tariff Reform Bill. He afterwards received the joint nomination of Tamany Hall and the County Democracy.

He was elected as a Democrat to the Fifty-first, Fifty-second, and Fifty-third Congresses. He served as chairman of the Committee on Private Land Claims (Fifty-second Congress) and the Committee on Election of President, Vice President, and Representatives (Fifty-third Congress). After four terms in Congress, he resigned on December 26, 1893.

=== 1893-1897: Comptroller of New York ===
Fitch resigned from Congress to accept Tammany Hall's nomination for Comptroller of New York City in 1893. He was elected on the Tammany Ticket and served in that office from 1893 until 1897. Writes historian David Remington, as comptroller Fitch "oversaw the city's finances during a time of terrible economic distress, withstanding threats from Tammany Hall on one side and from Mayor William L. Strong's misguided reform administration on the other."

In 1897, Tammany refused to renominate him. Chauncey Depew placed his name in nomination at the Republican convention to become the first Comptroller of the Consolidated New York. He was defeated. Wrote The New York Times, "at the first election for Greater New York the Republicans placed him in nomination [for Controller of the city] and he was swept out of power by the Tammany tidal wave."

=== Business career and memberships ===
He served as the founding president of the Trust Company of America in 1899. He remained president upon his death in May 1904. He was also a director of the American Light and Traction Company, the Bowling Green Trust Company, the Germania Bank, the Lion Brewery, and the Title Insurance Company of America.

He was a member of various social clubs, including the Metropolitan Club of Manhattan, the Lawyers' Club, the New York Yacht Club, the St. Nicholas Club, the Ardsley Country Club, the Germania Club, the Press Club, the Liederkranz Club, the Arion Society, and the Metropolitan Club of Washington. He was also president of the Franklin County Society. Further memberships included the Metropolitan Museum of Art, Sons of the Revolution, Military Order of Foreign Wars, New England Society, Municipal Art Society, New York Genealogical and Biographical Society, the Dunlap Society, and the New York Chamber of Commerce.

== Personal life ==
Fitch married Elizabeth Cross Fitch of Morrisville, New York in 1874. The couple had six children - three sons and three daughters. Ashbel Fitch died in New York City on May 4, 1904 in his home at 16 East 80th Street in Manhattan. The papers reported that he died by a stroke of apoplexy, and that he had been in poor health for some time. The service was held on May 6 at his home, and he was interred in Woodlawn Cemetery. His widow died suddenly in May 1913 at her home at 759 West End Avenue.

His son Ashbel P. Fitch also became a lawyer, at Fitch & Grant in New York at 67 Wall Street. A prominent member of the Manhattan Club, he was involved in several major cases, including a 1923 judgement to Richard Croker concerning loans to his father. He died on May 21, 1926, at the age of 49.

== See also ==
- Tariffs in United States history

U.S. House of Representatives
Preceded by Egbert L. Viele	Member of the U.S. House of Representatives from New York's 13th congressional district 1887–1893	Succeeded by John De Witt Warner
Preceded by Henry Bacon	Member of the U.S. House of Representatives from New York's 15th congressional district 1893	Succeeded by Isidor Straus
