= Trust Company of America =

Financial company (1899–1912)

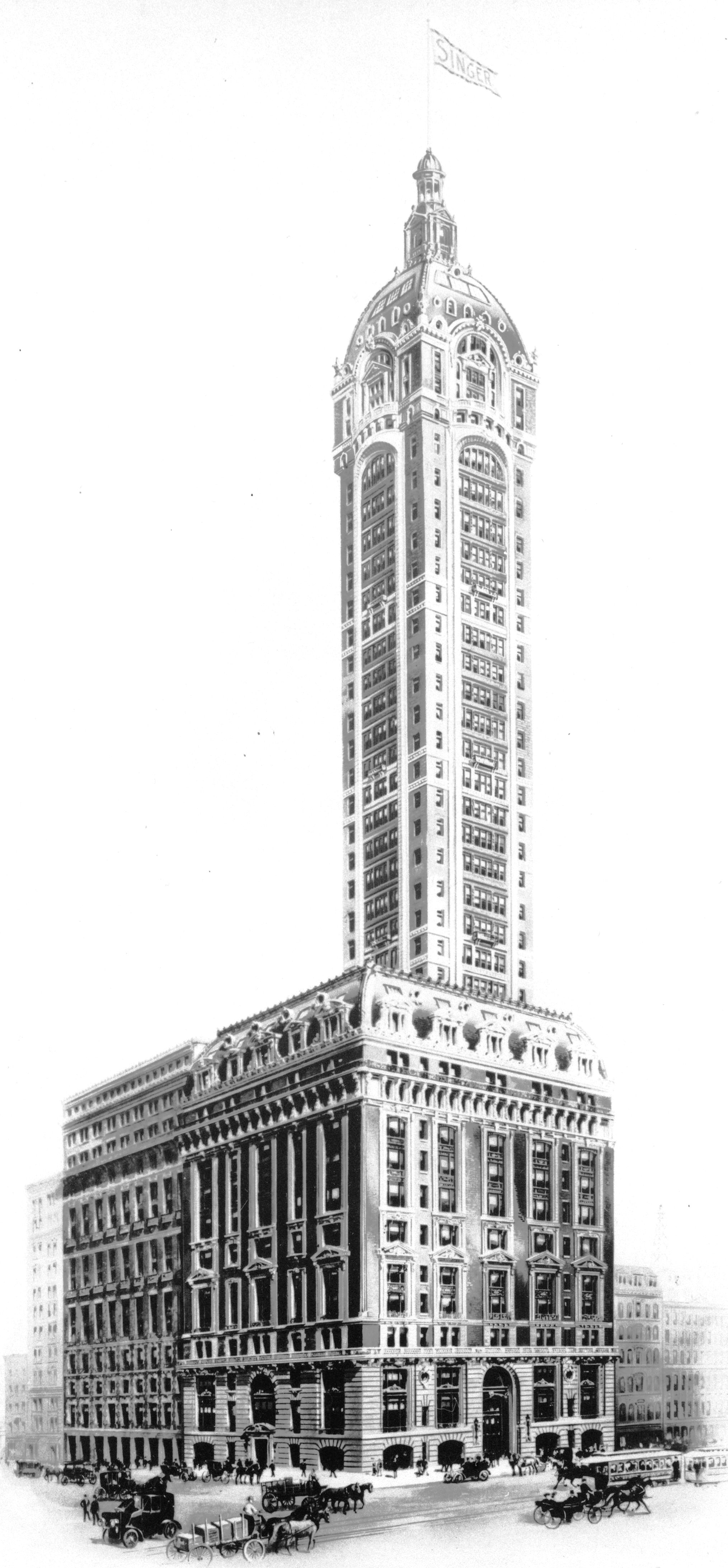
- Industry: Financial
- Genre: Trust company
- Founded: May 23, 1899; 127 years ago in Albany, New York, United States
- Founder: Ashbel P. Fitch
- Defunct: 1912
- Fate: Absorbed by the Equitable Trust Company in the spring of 1912
- Successor: Equitable Trust Company
- Headquarters: Singer Building, Manhattan; 37 Wall Street, Manhattan, New York City, United States

The Trust Company of America was a large company in New York City. Founded on May 23, 1899 in Albany, New York, its founding president was Ashbel P. Fitch and it was initially located in the Singer Building in Manhattan's Financial District. In 1907 the company absorbed the Colonial Trust Company, a commercial bank. During the Panic of 1907 it was the target of a bank run starting on October 23, 1907, which it survived with the backing of J. Pierpont Morgan and an infusion of gold from the Bank of England and other European sources. The company ultimately represented a consolidation of the North American Trust Company, the former Trust Company of America, the City Trust Company and the Colonial Trust Company. The Trust Company of America was absorbed by the Equitable Trust Company in the spring of 1912.

== History ==
=== 1899-1903: Formation ===
The Trust Company of America commenced business in 1895. Later on it represented a consolidation of the North American Trust Company, the former Trust Company of America, the City Trust Company and the Colonial Trust Company.

The company was incorporated in Albany, New York on May 23, 1899. It had been promoted by Edward F. Cragin, James M. Donald of Hanover National Bank, and Alvah Trowbridge of the National Bank of North America. New York Representative Ashbel P. Fitch was founding president. To start, the company had $2,500,000 in capital stock, with a paid-up surplus of the same amount. However, its structure was not fully outlined, with the general belief that it would be a trust company of trust companies, "and as such, a Clearing House for them." It was initially located in the Singer Building at Liberty Street and Broadway in Lower Manhattan's Financial District.

=== 1904-1905: Merger ===
In 1904 the North American Trust Company merged into the Trust Company of America. At the time, Oakleigh Thorne was president of the North American Trust Company.

On April 12, 1905, it was reported that the City Trust, the North American Trust, and the Trust Company of America were merging in the near future, in what the Times called "the most important trust company consolidation of recent years." It was announced the new company would be named the Trust Company of America, with capital of $2 million, a surplus of $9 million, and deposits over $50 million, "putting it among the strongest trust companies in New York." Thorne, then president of the North American Trust Company, was announced as the architect of the merger.

To facilitate the merger, Thorne employed a corporation to hold a majority of the stocks, with the Times writing that "Wall Street had never seen the idea applied to the control of banking institutions." Thorne and his associates formed the Broadway Securities Company to hold a majority of the stocks from the North American and the Trust Company of America "against the efforts of the minority interests" endeavoring to block the consolidation. Stock in all three companies was also placed under the control of a committee, consisting of Charles T. Barney, George R. Sheldon, Hosmer B. Parsons, Emerson McMillin, Oakleigh Thorne, and William H. Leupp. A vote to ratify the merger was called for April 18, 1905.

=== 1907: Colonial merger ===
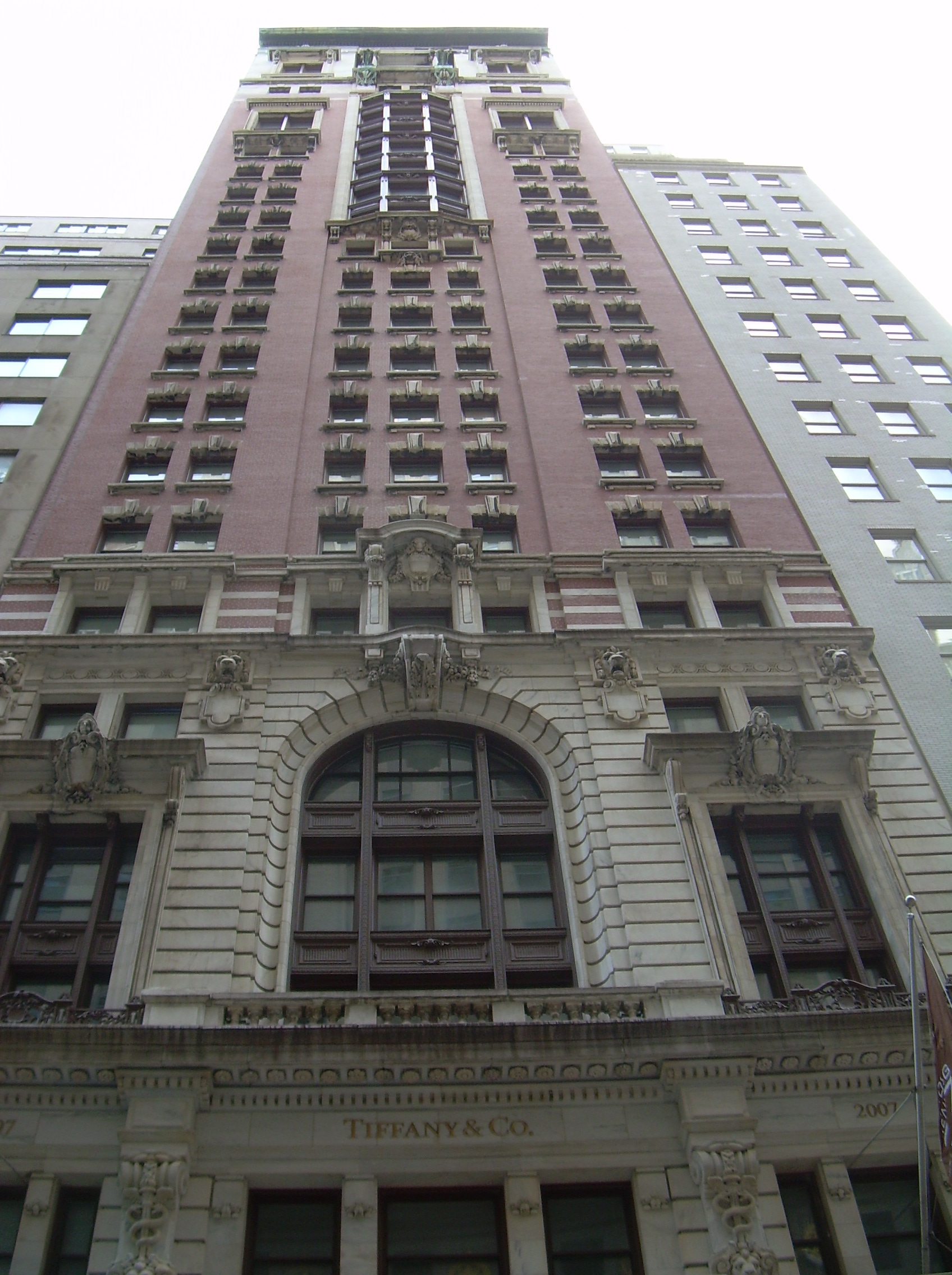
37 Wall Street

The company's second location was the ground floor of 37 Wall Street, a building which was designed by Francis Kimball and constructed during 1906 and 1907 for The Trust Company of America. The building, completed in 1907, stands at 25 floors. ′

On January 11, 1907, a plan was announced for a merger and consolidation of the Trust Company of America and the Colonial Trust Company, with Colonial to be absorbed. On January 16, 1907, meetings were held concerning the absorption of the Colonial Trust Company, with directors added to the board. Oakleigh Thorne was elected president, and John E. Borne was named chairman. The former quarters of the Colonial Trust Company continued to be maintained, in the St. Paul Building as the Colonial Branch. By October 1907, Colonial Trust Company operated as a branch of the Trust Company of America.

=== Panic of 1907 ===
As news spread of the Panic of 1907 in October, banks and trust companies were reluctant to lend any money. The interest rates on loans to brokers at the stock exchange soared to 70% and, with brokers unable to get money, stock prices fell to a low not seen since December 1900. The panic quickly spread to large trusts, including the Trust Company of America, the Lincoln Trust Company and Knickerbocker Trust.

On the afternoon of Tuesday, October 22, the president of the Trust Company of America asked J.P. Morgan for assistance. That evening Morgan conferred with George F. Baker, the president of First National Bank, James Stillman of the National City Bank of New York (the ancestor of Citibank), and the United States Secretary of the Treasury, George B. Cortelyou. Cortelyou said that he was ready to deposit government money in the banks to help shore up their deposits, and the group prepared to audit the Trust Company of America. President Oakleigh Thorne believed his Trust Company of America bank was in sound financial condition until a New York Times article stated otherwise. Thorne told reporters that if he paid off every depositor, he would still have US$4 million in assets. According to 1912 witness testimony by Oakleigh Thorne, the run was caused when on October 23, 1907, the New York Times reported that George W. Perkins had made a statement that help was to be extended to the company. He asserted the trust's finances had been of a normal state beforehand. The Times later acknowledged this argument, and denied they were the cause, calling the assertion "perversions of fact" and stating Thorne's comment had been published in seven other newspapers as well. The Times also asserted that the run had begun the day before the reporting, on October 22.

When the clearing house run by J. P. Morgan audited the bank's books, they found the bank was sound. After the overnight audit of the Trust Company of America showed the institution to be sound, on Wednesday afternoon October 23 Morgan declared, "This is the place to stop the trouble, then." As a run began on the Trust Company of America, Morgan worked with Stillman and Baker to liquidate the company's assets to allow the bank to pay depositors. The bank survived to the close of business, but Morgan knew that additional money would be needed to keep it solvent through the following day. That night he assembled the presidents of the other trust companies and held them in a meeting until midnight when they agreed to provide loans of $8.25 million to allow the Trust Company of America to stay open the next day. The run on the bank continued on October 25, with a long line preventing some clients from withdrawing their funds. Ultimately, the trust withstood a run on its deposits lasting several days. On November 6, 1907, Trust Company of America president Oakleigh Thorne met with J. P. Morgan and others in a conference. Directly afterwards, Thorne announced the company was again "absolutely sound," and had paid out $34,000,000 in banking since the start of the run. No changes in management were intended, with "ample" cash available.

=== 1908-1912: After the panic and merger ===
On December 21, 1911, the trust reported total resources of $34,220,982. By early 1912, the trust continued to have a "large building advantageously situated in the financial district," owning the skyscraper at 37 to 43 Wall Street. Its banking rooms were described as "perfectly equipped" and "among the most spacious in the city."

On January 17, 1912, it was reported that president Alvin Krech of the Equitable Trust Company had made an offer of $375 per share for the stock of the Trust Company of America. Thorne approved, with the offer to stand open until February 15 pending a shareholder vote on the issue. The merged company would be named Equitable Trust Company, with the Trust Company of America eliminated. It was reported that if the merger went through, Equitable would have deposits of around $70 million. At the time, the Trust Company of America had capital of $2 million and a surplus of $6 million. It had deposits of $27 million. Thorne remained president until the Trust Company of America was absorbed by the Equitable Trust Company in the spring of 1912. The deal was accepted by the shareholders in early February 1912, and closed the first week of that month.

=== Post-absorption and legacy ===
As Equitable's skyscraper had recently burned down, Equitable moved itself into the banking rooms that the Trust Company of America owned on the bottom floor of their 37 Wall Street skyscraper. Equitable also obtained ownership of the entire skyscraper. Equitable later merged with Chase Manhattan Bank.

As of January 1941, Arthur S. Kleeman was president of the Colonial Trust Company, which remained a commercial bank in New York. In August 1955, the Colonial Trust Company remained active, electing a new director James C. Olson.

== Directors ==
Directors for the new company were selected on May 22, 1899, and included Ashbel P. Fitch, William Barbour, Charles F. Cutler, John R. Hegeman, Henry O. Havemeyer, Myron T. Herrick, Henry S. Manning, Emerson McMillin, E. C. Converse, James M. Donald, Alvah Trowbridge, Samuel A. Maxwell, J. William Clark, Joel Francis Freeman, William E. Spier, Anson R. Flower, George Blumenthal, Henry S. Redmond, C. I. Hudson, S. C. T. Dodd, Willard Brown, Philip Lehman, and Edward F. Cragin. Among others, George Crocker (February 10, 1856 – December 4, 1909) served as a director.

By early 1912, directors included Ashbel P. Fitch, Oakleigh Thorne, Albert B. Boardman, William H. Chesebrough, Charles D. Frecman, H. B. Hollins, Frank P. Lawrence, Charles C. Meyer, Seth M. Milliken, Morgan J. O'Brien, Joseph J. O'Donohoue Jr., Lowell M. Palmer, Stephen Peabody, E. Clifford Potter, William F. Sheehan, George R. Sheldon, P. F. Shoemaker, and W. K. Vanderbilt Jr.

== See also ==
- Charles E. Mitchell
- John Warne Gates
