= Ewington =

Ewington may refer to:

== People ==
- John Ewington (1936 –2015), British organist
- Julie Ewington, specialist in contemporary art, chair of the board of the 4A Centre for Contemporary Asian Art, Sydney, Australia

== Places ==
- Ewington Township, Minnesota
- Ewington, Ohio
