= CCH (company) =

American financial publisher and software company

- Formerly: Commerce Clearing House
- Type: Subsidiary
- Industry: Tax & Accounting
- Founded: 1892; 134 years ago
- Headquarters: 2700 Lake Cook Road, Riverwoods, Illinois, U.S.,
- Key people: Jason Marx (CEO)
- Number of employees: 3,600
- Parent: Wolters Kluwer
- Website: cchgroup.com

CCH, formerly Commerce Clearing House, is a provider of software and information services for tax, accounting and audit workers. Since 1995 it has been a subsidiary of Wolters Kluwer.

== History ==
Commerce Clearing House was founded in 1892 and was acquired by Oakleigh Thorne in 1907.

CCH has been publishing materials on U.S. tax law and tax compliance since the inception of the modern U.S. federal income tax in 1913. CCH owned the publisher Facts on File from 1965 to 1993. Wolters Kluwer bought CCH in 1995.

Today, CCH is also recognized for its software and integrated workflow tools. CCH operates on a global scale and includes operations in the United States, Europe, Asia-Pacific and Canada.

== Case law reporters ==
The following is a list of case law reporters published by CCH:

- Bankruptcy Law Reporter (Bankr. L. Rep.)
- Copyright Law Reporter (Copy. L. Rep.)
- Employment Practice Decisions (Empl. Prac. Dec.)
- Federal Contracting Cases (Cont. Cas. Fed.)
- Federal Estate & Gift Tax Law Reporter
- Federal Securities Law Reporter (Fed. Sec. L. Rep.)
- Labor Cases (Lab. Cas.)
- Products Liability Reporter (Prod. Liab. Rep.)
- Standard Federal Tax Reporter
- Trade Cases (Trade Cas.)
- U.S. Tax Cases (U.S. Tax Cas.)
- Unemployment Insurance Reporter (Unemployment Ins. Rep.)
- Utilities Law Reporter
