= Wager Swayne =

American general and politician (1834–1902)

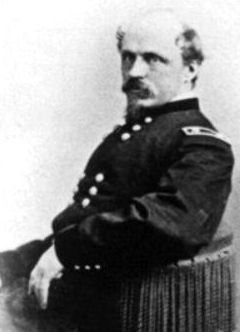
- Medal of Honor recipient
- Born: November 10, 1834; Columbus, Ohio, United States
- Died: December 18, 1902 (aged 68); New York City, New York, United States
- Burial place: Arlington National Cemetery
- Alma mater: Yale University
- Relatives: Noah Haynes Swayne
- Military career
- Allegiance: United States of America; Union
- Branch: United States Army; Union Army
- Service years: 1861–1870
- Rank: Major General
- Commands: 43rd Ohio Infantry; 45th U.S. Infantry Regiment
- Conflicts: American Civil War: Battle of Iuka; Second Battle of Corinth; Atlanta campaign
- Awards: Medal of Honor

Wager Swayne (November 10, 1834 – December 18, 1902) was a Union Army colonel during the American Civil War and was appointed as the last major general of volunteers of the Union Army. Swayne received America's highest military decoration, the Medal of Honor for his actions at the Second Battle of Corinth. He was also effectively the military governor of Alabama from March 2, 1867, to July 14, 1868, after the passage of the first Reconstruction Act by the U.S. Congress until Alabama was readmitted to the Union. Robert M. Patton remained the nominal governor during this period, but as the local army commander, Swayne controlled the State government. During the Reconstruction era, Swayne oversaw the Freedmen's Bureau in Alabama and helped establish schools for African Americans in the state. He was the first person born after Alabama statehood to govern the state.

== Biography ==
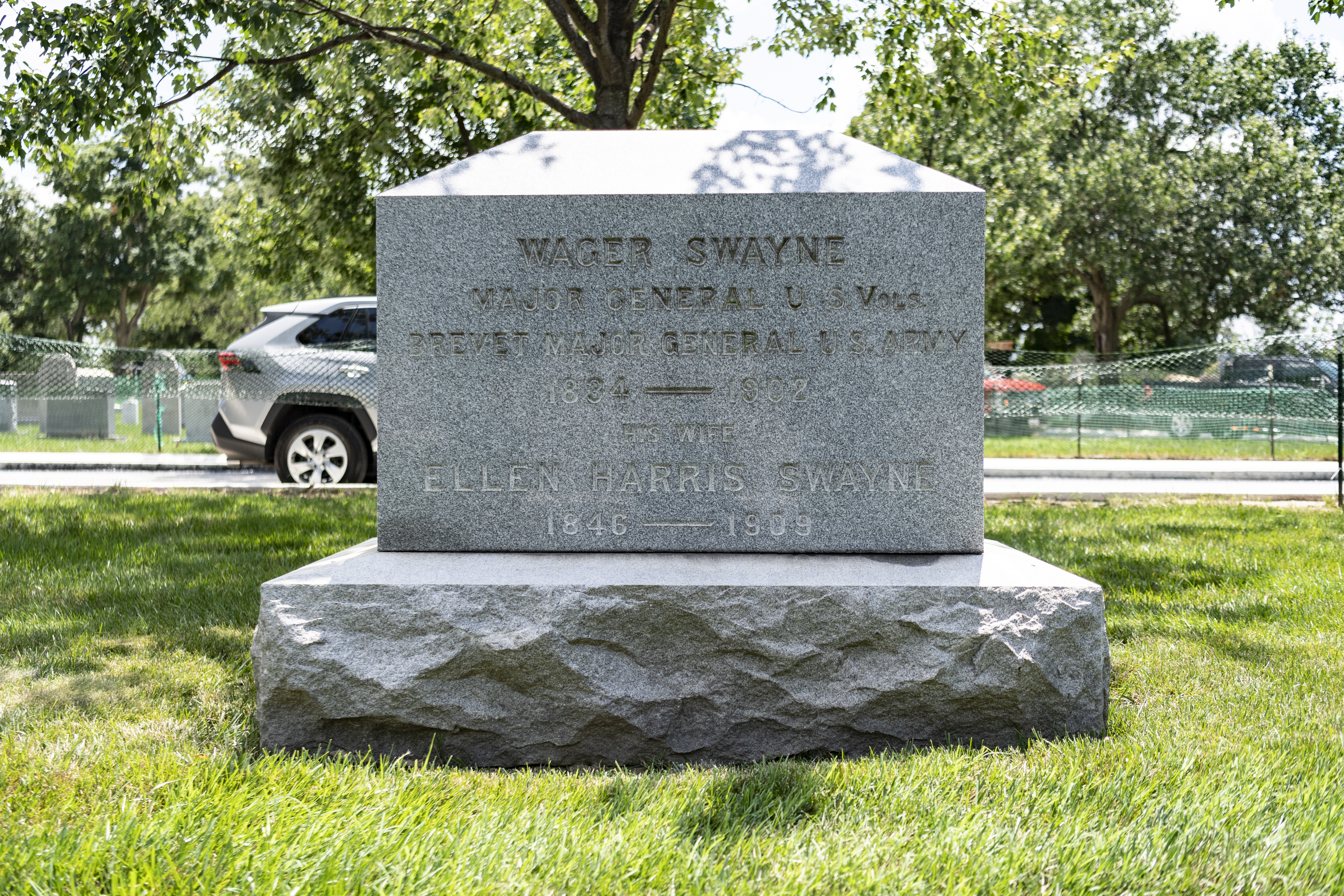
Grave at Arlington National Cemetery

Born in Columbus, Ohio, on November 10, 1834, Swayne was the son of Noah Haynes Swayne, associate justice of the United States Supreme Court. He graduated from Yale University in 1856, was a member of the Scroll & Key Secret Society, and became a lawyer in Ohio.

He served in the Union Army during the Civil War as a field officer in one of Ohio's three-year infantry regiments. In August 1861, Governor William Dennison appointed Swayne as major of the 43rd Ohio Volunteer Infantry Regiment, which was being organized in Mount Vernon, Ohio. He fought at the battles of Iuka and Corinth, and was promoted to fill the vacancy caused by the death of the regiment's colonel.

Swayne led the 43rd Ohio Volunteer Infantry with distinction during the Atlanta campaign and in the Carolinas campaign until February 2, 1865, when he suffered a severe wound at the Battle of Rivers' Bridge (site now part of Rivers Bridge State Historic Site) in South Carolina by the Salkehatchie River, which resulted in the amputation of his right leg.

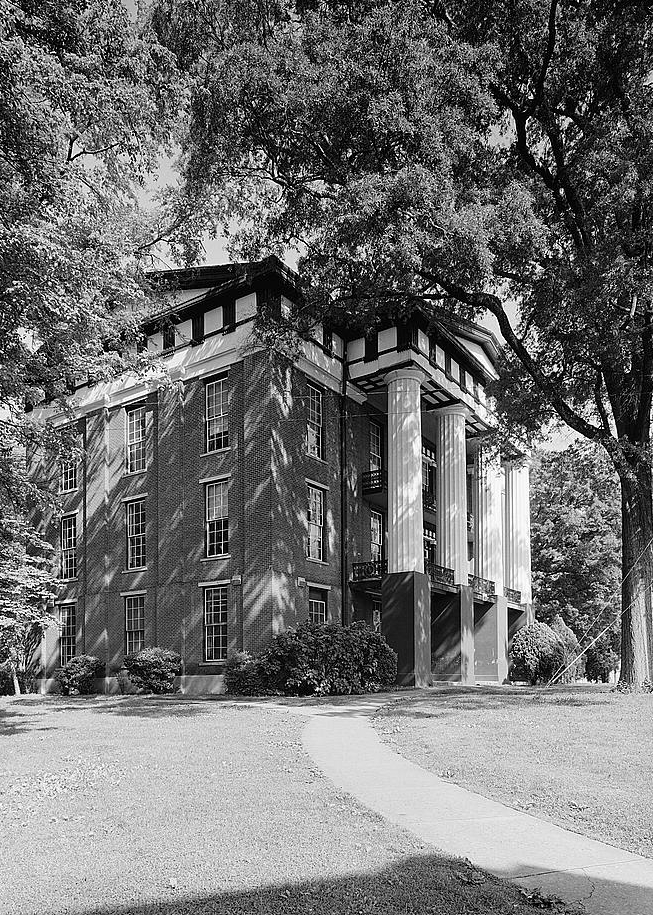
Built in 1852, and eventually named for Wager Swayne, Swayne Hall is the oldest building on the campus of Talladega College, Alabama's oldest private historically black college located in Talladega, Alabama. The building was placed on the National Register of Historic Places on December 2, 1974

On March 13, 1865, President Abraham Lincoln appointed Swayne brigadier general of volunteers to rank from March 8, 1865. President Lincoln submitted the nomination to the U.S. Senate on that date and the Senate confirmed the appointment on March 10, 1865.

On May 1, 1866, President Andrew Johnson appointed Swayne as major general of volunteers to rank from June 20, 1865. The President nominated Swayne for the promotion on March 21, 1866, and the U.S. Senate confirmed the appointment on April 26, 1866. This appointment took precedence over his appointment as a brevet major general of volunteers to which grade he had been appointed by President Johnson on January 13, 1866, to rank from October 13, 1865. The U.S. Senate confirmed this appointment on March 12, 1866. He was the last major general of volunteers appointed during the American Civil War period. He also was commissioned colonel of the 45th United States Infantry Regiment. Later, on April 10, 1867, President Johnson appointed Swayne to the grade of brevet major general in the Regular Army to rank from March 2, 1867. The Senate approved this nomination on April 15, 1867. Swayne was mustered out of the volunteer army on September 1, 1867, but stayed in the Regular Army.

After the war, he served as head of the Freedmen's Bureau for Alabama from July 26, 1865, to January 14, 1868. From March 2, 1867, to July 14, 1868, as local army commander, Swayne effectively controlled the State government, although Robert M. Patton remained the nominal governor during this period.

Swayne was unassigned as of March 15, 1869, when the army was reorganized and his regiment was consolidated with the 14th U.S. Infantry Regiment. Swayne retired from the army on July 1, 1870. He then moved to Toledo, Ohio, where he established a law practice. He moved in 1881 to New York City, where he set up another law practice, specializing in representing telegraph and railroad companies.

In 1893, he was awarded a Medal of Honor for "conspicuous gallantry in restoring order at a critical moment and leading his regiment in a charge" at Corinth.

By May 1899, the North American Trust Company had directors such as John G. Carlisle, Adlai E. Stevenson, and Wager Swayne.

He died in New York City on December 18, 1902, and was buried at Arlington National Cemetery Arlington County, Virginia, Plot: Section 3, Lot 1406.

== Medal of Honor citation ==

Rank and Organization:

Rank and organization: Lieutenant Colonel, 43d Ohio Infantry. Place and date: At Corinth, Miss., October 4, 1862. Entered service at: Columbus, Ohio. Born: November 10, 1834, Columbus, Ohio. Date of issue: August 19, 1893.

Citation: Conspicuous gallantry in restoring order at a critical moment and leading his regiment in a charge.

== See also ==
- List of American Civil War Medal of Honor recipients: Q–S
- List of American Civil War generals (Union)
- List of Ohio's American Civil War generals
- Bibliography of the American Civil War

== Notes ==
Political offices
Preceded by Robert M. Patton	Governor of Alabama; 1867–1868	Succeeded by William H. Smith
