= Oakleigh Thorne =

American businessperson

- Born: July 31, 1866; New Hamburg, New York
- Died: May 23, 1948 (aged 81); New York's Doctors Hospital
- Other name: W.O.S. Thorne
- Occupations: Businessperson, publisher, cattle breeder
- Years active: 1890s-1940s
- Known for: Pulling Trust Company of America through Panic of 1907
- Political party: Republican
- Spouse: Helen Seymour Stafford (m. 1889)
- Children: 3
- Parent(s): Charlotte (Pearsall) Thorne, Edward Thomas Thorne
- Awards: Two Grand Championships at the International Live Stock Exposition

W.O.S. Thorne, more generally known as Oakleigh Thorne (July 31, 1866 − May 23, 1948), was an American businessperson, a publisher of tax guides, a banker, and a philanthropist. Among his early ventures were the consolidation of brickyards on the Hudson River, and later he was president of the National Switch and Signal Company and Westinghouse Electric's vice president.

In 1900, he came to New York City as vice president of the International Banking and Trust Company, becoming president. That company became the Trust Company of America, of which Thorne was serving as president. He helped the company survive a bank run during the Panic of 1907, securing the backing of J. Pierpont Morgan and European sources. He served as a director of Wells Fargo & Company from 1902 to 1918.

In addition to his connection with Commerce Clearing House, Wells Fargo, and the Trust Company of America, Thorne was a director of the Corporation Trust Company and of the Bank of Millbrook. After purchasing Briarcliff Farms in 1918, he became a breeder of champion Angus cattle. He was inducted into the Angus Heritage Foundation Hall of Fame in 1934.

== Early life and education ==
Oakleigh Thorne was born on July 31, 1866, in New Hamburg, New York, the son of Edward Thomas Thorne and Charlotte (Pearsall) Thorne. He is of the fourth generation of a family that settled in Dutchess County in 1785, making his family's ancestors "among the earliest settlers within the [state of New York]." The founder of the American branch of Thorne's family had settled first in Massachusetts and then in Long Island. Inheriting a considerable fortune from his parents, Thorne was educated in the schools of Poughkeepsie, New York. While studying he took in active interest in the politics of Poughkeepsie, and at one time was the president of the village of Millbrook, New York.

== Career ==
=== 1890s-1911: Early ventures ===
In 1892, Thorne purchased a small printing company that under his management became Commerce Clearing House, a major publisher of tax guides for lawyers and accountants. One of Thorne's early ventures was the consolidation of several brickyards on the Hudson River. Later he was president of the Easton, Pennsylvania, company National Switch and Signal Company. As of January 1894, Thorne remained president of the National Switch and Signal Company. When that company was acquired by the Union Switch and Signal Company of Westinghouse Electric, he became Westinghouse Electric's vice president.

Thorne was elected a director of Wells Fargo & Company on January 2, 1902. This was at the time control of the express company passed to E.H. Harriman; the company headquarters moved from San Francisco to New York City in 1904. Thorne remained a director of Wells Fargo until the company ceased express service in 1918. In addition to his connection with Commerce Clearing House, Wells Fargo, and Trust Company of America, Thorne was a director of the Corporation Trust Company and of the Bank of Millbrook. In September 1911, Thorne did not deny reports that he wanted to run for Congress in the 21st District as a Republican in the fall, possibly running against Hamilton Fish.

On November 5, 1908, a court case commenced in which Thorne was sued by lawyer John W. Herbert over $83,400, who alleged that Thorne had presented false and fraudulent information about stock value, leading to Herbert's investment in the International Fire Engine Company. The case was dismissed on November 13, with the judge noting that there was no evidence to show that Thorne's earlier assessment of value had been incorrect.

=== 1900-1912: Trust Company of America ===
He was 34 years old when he came to New York at vice president of the International Banking and Trust Company, in 1900. Several months later the company appointed him president. When that company was merged with the North American Trust Company, Thorne became the latter's vice president and later president. He was president of the North American Trust Company until it merged in 1904, becoming part of the Trust Company of America. Thorne was serving as president of Trust Company of America when its main office on Wall Street was the target of a bank run starting on Wednesday, October 23, 1907, during the Panic of 1907. It survived, with the backing of J. Pierpont Morgan and an infusion of gold from the Bank of England and other European sources. Thorne remained president until the Trust Company of America was absorbed by the Equitable Trust Company in the spring of 1912. When he retired from the Trust Company of America, Thorne spent $500,000 purchasing the Corporation Trust Company of New Jersey. He explained he made the purchase to provide employment to the men who had stood by him during the 1907 run on the bank, as many of them lost their jobs when the Trust Company of America merged with the Equitable Trust.

=== 1906-1914: Railroad and real estate speculation ===
Expanding into the realm of railroad speculation, Thorne and his partner Marsden J. Perry bought up a controlling interest in the failing New York, Westchester and Boston Railway in 1906. In November 1906, after a long franchise fight, the New York & Port Chester Railroad and the New York, Westchester & Boston Railroad agreed to consolidate. "Absolute" control of both roads passed to Thorne and Marsden J. Perry. The Times reported that both had been directors in Westchester with controlling interests, and that Thorne had possibly secured a directorship with the opposition with the goal of securing the merger. Thorne was president of the Milbrook Company, which was organized as the holding company of the New York, New Haven & Hartford Railroad. The Milbrook Company then sold on October 29, 1907, by Thorne and Marsden. The merger resulted in a lawsuit by a banker with interest in the companies, seeking an injunction against the merger in late 1906. On January 10, 1908, after New Haven took over the holdings in the Westchester and Port Chester Railroads owned by Perry and Thorne, an injunction was uphold stalling Port Chester's purchase. In a formal statement issued on March 9, 1914, Thorne confirmed that he had accepted $8,250,000 from J. P. Morgan & Co. to purchase the New Haven Road, with the money used to purchase the securities of the New York, Westchester & Boston and New York & Port Chester Railroads. He had also purchased their construction companies and the developments, and upon the cancellation of his contract, Thorne turned over all the acquired assets to J. P. Morgan & Co.

In March 1913, Thorne and William H. Chesebrough purchased the corners at the northwest corner of State and Whitehall Streets on Long Island, with plans to build a skyscraper for use as an office building.

=== 1918-1930s: Agricultural career ===
On October 9, 1918, it was announced that Thorne had purchased Briarcliff Farms at Pine Plains, New York At the time, the property had 4,200 acres and had a herd of around 1,000 cows. That year Thorne changed careers to focus on developing Briarcliff, which was originally a dairy farm that used for beef cattle production. He then served as chairman of the Better Beef Association, leading efforts to establish grades on market beef in 1927. He became president of the American Angus Association, from 1929 to 1931.

He started winning various divisional awards for his steer at the International Live Stock Exposition in 1924. He became the first to win the grand championship at the International Live Stock Exposition twice, in 1931 and 1933 in the Chicago stock yards. His winning steer the first time was a black Aberdeen Angus steer named Briarcliff Thickset. He was inducted into the Angus Heritage Foundation Hall of Fame in 1934.

== Philanthropy ==
Thorne dedicated the garden and village green of Millbrook, landscaped by his wife, as a memorial to the men of Washington, New York, who died in the World Wars. Although not Catholic, Thorne was a close friend of Patrick Cardinal Hayes, and in 1940 he gave the Chancellor Estate in Millbrook to the Archdiocese of New York to serve as a memorial to Hayes and a convalescent home for children. On May 16, 1947, it became public that Thorne had contributed $50,000 to the St. Francis Hospital building fund, of which he was general chairman. Thorne had long been a contributor to the hospital, having contributed to the addition of the Thorne wing in 1919.

== Personal life ==
A "crack shot" in pigeon shooting, he won the international pigeon-shooting match for the Gun Club International Cup in England in July 1892, as one of three Americans out of 69 competitors. On February 26, 1889, he married Helen Seymour Stafford (1866–1952). His marriage ceremony was described by the Times as "brilliant," taking place at Christ Church in St. Louis with many New Yorkers in attendance. Thorne's brother, Thomas Thorne, served as best man. The couple went on to have three daughters. In February 1909, he entertained for 24 friends at Delmonico's in New York, with professional vaudeville entertainment for the dinner. The Times reported that "it was said that [the event] was one of the most elaborate small affairs that had been given [at Delmonico's] this season."

In 1916, Thorne ceased living at his town home at Park Avenue and 73 Street to live full-time in Millbrook, New York, at his Thornedale estate with his family, which remained the family's principal place of residence as of 1950. A number of incidents at Thornedale reached the press, and in July 1916, Thorne was rushed from Thornedale to a hospital in Poughkeepsie to have an operation for appendicitis. With Thorne recovering from his operation at Thornedale, in early August 1916, two large barns on the Thornedale estate were burned, with the fires put out by the Millbrook Fire Department. When Mrs. Thorne received information that new fires were to be started, she hired a force of detectives to guard every building on the estate. In August 1919, Thorne had his ex-butler arrested on the charge of writing annoying letters to his daughter. Thornedale was robbed of silverware in July 1922 while the Thorne family slept, the second time it was robbed that year. On October 21, 1922, residents of Millbrook held a hunt ball at the Sunny Croft estate of Frederick Chesebrough, in honor of Thorne and his wife, with Thorne dubbed master of hounds. The event marked the official opening of the hunting season.

Thorne died on May 23, 1948, in New York's Doctors Hospital at the age of 81. His death was attributed to shock, after he broke his leg a week earlier at a fall at Thornedale. The funeral service was held on May 25 at Thornedale. He was survived by his wife Helen and two daughters; Mrs. Philip S. Chancellor and Mrs. Daryl Parshall. Helen Thorne died in California in November 1952. Thorne has a number of grandchildren and great-grandchildren, and his great-grandson Oakleigh Thorne was #1014 on Forbes' 2008 list of the world's billionaires.

In honor of Helen Thorne, the Garden Club of America established in the 1950s the Mrs. Oakleigh Thorne Medal for outstanding work in garden landscaping, design, architecture, or art. She designed outstanding gardens, both civic and private, for the communities where she lived in New York state and, later, in California.
