= Roland R. Conklin =

American financier (1858–1938)

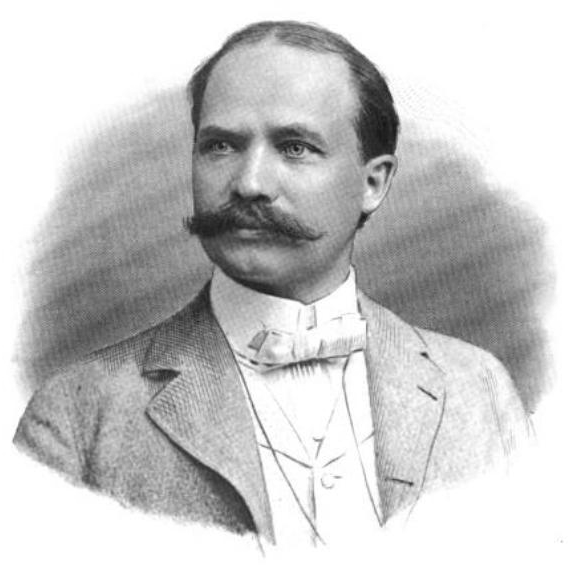
- Born: Roland Ray Conklin; February 1, 1858; Urbana, Illinois
- Died: January 2, 1938 (aged 79); New York, New York
- Education: University of Illinois
- Occupation: Financier

Signature
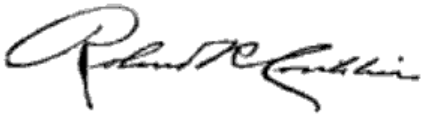

Roland Ray Conklin (February 1, 1858 – January 2, 1938) was an American financier and real estate mogul from Illinois. After graduating from the University of Illinois, Conklin formed a real estate partnership with Samuel M. Jarvis. The Jarvis-Conklin Mortgage and Trust Company developed neighborhoods in Kansas City, Cleveland, and Baltimore. After dissolving following the Panic of 1893, Conklin re-organized the company into the North American Trust Company. The new company was appointed the official bank of the United States in Cuba. Conklin founded several corporations there. He donated the funds for the Alma Mater at the University of Illinois in the 1910s.

== Biography ==
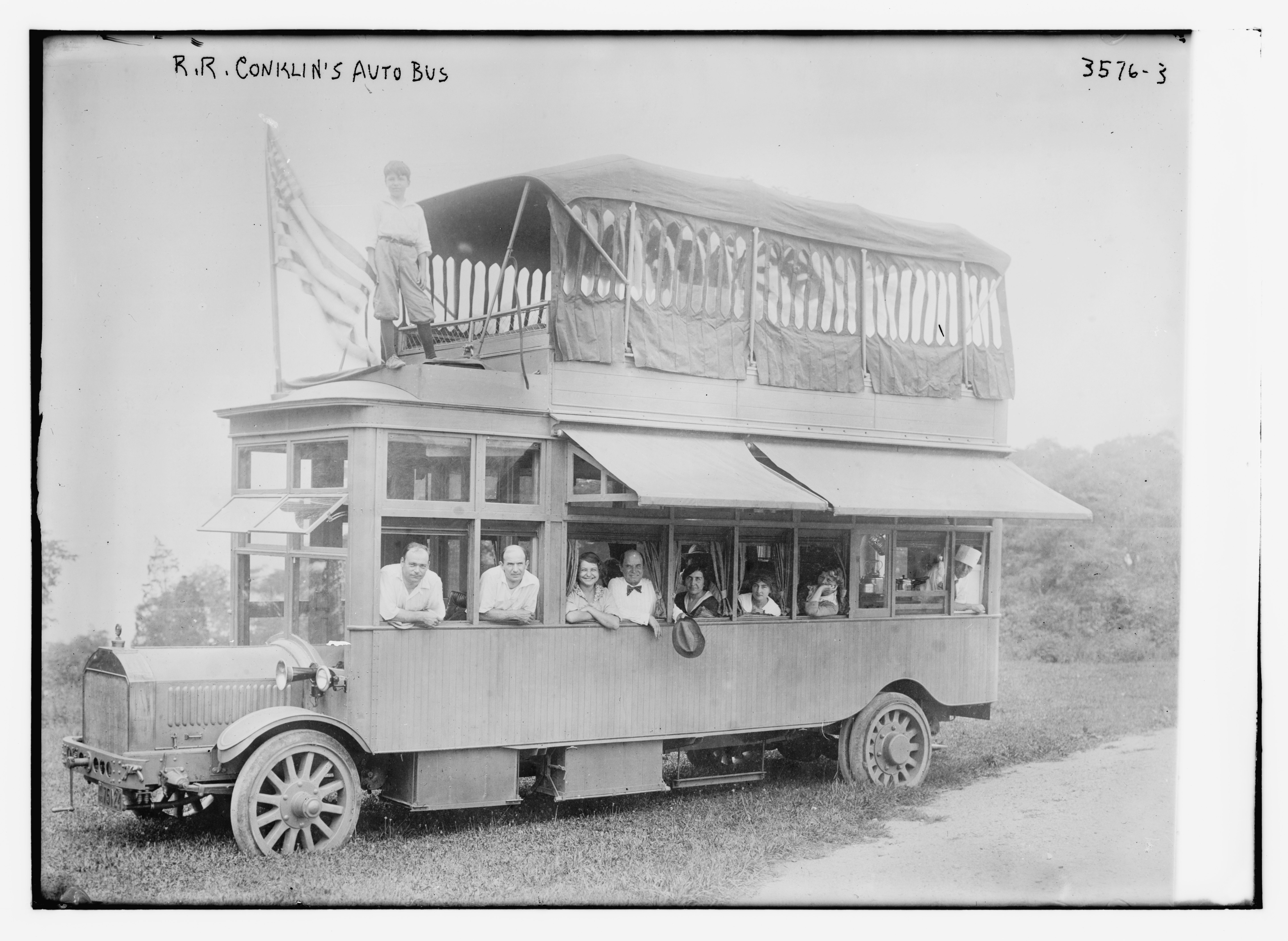
R. R. Conklin's motor bus (1915)

Roland Ray Conklin was born in Urbana, Illinois, on February 1, 1858. He attended schools there, then graduated from the University of Illinois in 1880. He joined a real estate firm Kansas City, Missouri, in 1880, which incorporated in 1886 as the Jarvis-Conklin Mortgage and Trust Company. The firm became very successful and is credited with developing the Hyde Park and Rowland Park neighborhoods of Kansas City. They also founded the neighborhoods of Roland Park in Baltimore, Maryland, and Euclid Park in Cleveland, Ohio. They became the first bank to establish an international branch when they opened one in London in 1889. In 1893, the company moved its headquarters to New York City, but dissolved only months later following the Panic of 1893. Conklin reorganized the business as the North American Trust Company (NATC).

After the financial collapse of the Jarvis-Conklin Mortgage Trust Company in 1893, Conklin and his business partner, Samuel M. Jarvis, were made receivers of the company. British investors objected to their appointment, charging that the partners had transferred money meant for payment to investors into their other speculative ventures. They also claimed that the partners had used associates to buy up mortgages at low prices before selling them at greatly increased values. Attempts to get the two men removed as receivers failed; Jarvis then resigned, but Conklin stayed on in the role. On December 13, 1895, the company's assets and securities were sold to the North American Trust Company, which had been set up by Jarvis and Conklin. The securities had a face value of $1,775,000, but the sale brought in only $236,000 (approximately $70.8 million and $9.4 million in 2026 dollars, respectively).

In 1896, the North American Trust Company was named the fiscal agent for the United States consul in Cuba. Conklin oversaw many operations in his new country: he founded the National Bank of Cuba, the Havana Telephone Company, the Cuban Telephone Company, and several publishing houses. Conklin was also named a vice president of the Jucaro & Moron Railway Company and co-founded the National Railways Company of Cuba. By May 1899, vice presidents Samuel M. Jarvis and Conklin were the primary stockholders of the North American Trust Company, also serving on the board.

Conklin later returned to the United States, purchasing the vast Rosemary Farm in Lloyd Harbor, New York. He served as president of the Chicago Motorbus Company. In the 1910s, he provided the capital for the Alma Mater at the University of Illinois, designed by classmate Lorado Taft. In 1915, Conklin designed a motorhome and drove it to the Panama–Pacific International Exposition in San Francisco, California. NATC was merged into the Chase Manhattan Bank.

Conklin was a member of the Metropolitan Museum of Art, American Museum of Natural History, New York Botanical Gardens, and the National Arts Club. He married Mary MacFadden on May 4, 1898. They had three children: Julia Cecilia, Roland Hunt, and Rosemary. He died in New York City on January 2, 1938.
