= William L. Trenholm =

Comptroller of the United States

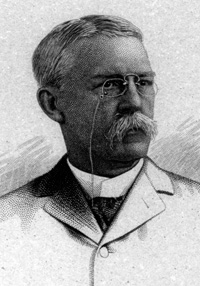

6th Comptroller of the Currency
- In office April 20, 1886 - April 30, 1889
- President: Grover Cleveland; Benjamin Harrison
- Preceded by: Henry W. Cannon
- Succeeded by: Edward S. Lacey

Personal details
- Party: Democratic
- Occupation: Financier, business executive

William L. Trenholm (1836–1901) was a United States Comptroller of the Currency from 1886 to 1889. In 1898, Trenholm (then president of the American Surety Company) was elected president of the North American Trust Company.

== Biography ==
Trenholm attended South Carolina College, where he was a member of the Delta Kappa Epsilon fraternity, graduating in 1855.

Comptroller of the Currency from 1886 to 1889, Trenholm, a Confederate Army veteran, was the first Democrat and first Southerner to be appointed Comptroller. Appointed to office by President Grover Cleveland, he was known for the large number of changes he recommended in the banking laws. Some, such as the provision that banks could change name and location without an act of Congress, were adopted. Other recommendations influenced later legislation, including the Federal Reserve Act of 1913. Trenholm resigned to become president of a large insurance company and later served as president of a trust company.

On January 19, 1898, Trenholm (then president of the American Surety Company) was elected president of the North American Trust Company. He succeeded Samuel M. Jarvis, who stayed on as a director of the North American Trust Company and focused on its international operations. Other members of the company's leadership were former Treasury Secretary John G. Carlisle and diplomat William I. Buchanan, and former U.S. Vice President Adlai Stevenson acted as legal counsel. While Trenholm was president, the company expanded its activities to Cuba by becoming the United States' fiscal agent there in July 1898 and by opening branches in Santiago de Cuba and Havana.

In 1899, Trenholm desired to be "free of business cares" and retire, and an election was held for a new president at 100 Broadway. On May 26, 1899, Alvah Trowbridge was elected as the new president of the company, succeeding Trenholm.

== See also ==
- Bank regulation in the United States
