= 43rd Ohio Infantry Regiment =

- Active: September 28, 1861, to July 13, 1865
- Country: United States
- Allegiance: Union
- Branch: Union Army
- Type: Infantry
- Engagements: Battle of Island No. 10; Siege of Corinth; Battle of Iuka; Second Battle of Corinth; Atlanta campaign; Battle of Resaca; Battle of Dallas; Battle of New Hope Church; Battle of Allatoona; Battle of Kennesaw Mountain; Battle of Atlanta; Siege of Atlanta; Battle of Jonesboro; Battle of Lovejoy's Station; Sherman's March to the Sea; Carolinas campaign; Battle of Bentonville

The 43rd Ohio Infantry Regiment was an infantry regiment in the Union Army during the American Civil War.

== Service ==
The 43rd Ohio Infantry Regiment was organized in Mount Vernon, Ohio September 28, 1861, through February 1, 1862, and mustered in for three years service under the command of Colonel Joseph L. Kirby Smith.

The regiment was attached to 1st Brigade, 1st Division, Army of the Mississippi, to March 1862. 2nd Brigade, 1st Division, Army of the Mississippi, to April 1862. 1st Brigade, 2nd Division, Army of the Mississippi, to November 1862. 1st Brigade, 8th Division, Left Wing, XIII Corps, Department of the Tennessee, to December 1862. 1st Brigade, 8th Division, XVI Corps, to March 1863. 4th Brigade, District of Corinth, Mississippi, 2nd Division, XVI Corps, to May 1863. 3rd Brigade, District of Memphis, Tennessee, 5th Division, XVI Corps, to November 1863. Fuller's Brigade, 2nd Division, XVI Corps, to March 1864. 2nd Brigade, 4th Division, XVI Corps, to September 1864. 2nd Brigade, 1st Division, XVII Corps, to July 1865.

The 43rd Ohio Infantry mustered out of service at Louisville, Kentucky, on July 13, 1865.

== Detailed service ==
Left Ohio for Commerce, Mo., February 21, 1862. Siege operations against New Madrid, Mo., March 3–14, 1862. Siege and capture of Island No. 10, Mississippi River, and capture of McCall's forces at Tiptonville, Mo., March 15-April 8. Expedition to Fort Pillow, Tenn., April 13–17. Moved to Hamburg Landing, Tenn., April 18–22. Action at Monterey April 29. Advance on and siege of Corinth, Miss., April 29-May 30. Reconnaissance toward Corinth May 8. Occupation of Corinth and pursuit to Booneville May 30-June 12. Duty at Clear Creek until August 20, and at Bear Creek until September 11. Battle of Iuka, Miss., September 19. Battle of Corinth October 3–4. Pursuit to Ripley October 5–12. Grant's Central Mississippi Campaign November 2, 1862, to January 12, 1863. Duty at Corinth until April 1863. Dodge's Expedition to northern Alabama April 15-May 8. Rock Cut, near Tuscumbia, April 22. Tuscumbia April 23. Town Creek April 28. Duty at Memphis, Tenn., until October, and at Prospect, Tenn., until February 1864. Atlanta Campaign May 1 to September 1864. Demonstrations on Resaca May 8–13. Sugar Valley, near Resaca, May 9. Near Resaca May 13. Battle of Resaca May 14–15. Advance on Dallas May 18–25. Operations on line of Pumpkin Vine Creek and battles about Dallas, New Hope Church, and Allatoona Hills May 25-June 5. Operations about Marietta and against Kennesaw Mountain June 10-July 2. Assault on Kennesaw June 27. Nickajack Creek July 2–5. Ruff's Mills July 3–4. Chattahoochie River July 6–17. Battle of Atlanta July 22. Siege of Atlanta July 22-August 25. Flank movement on Jonesboro August 25–30. Battle of Jonesboro August 31-September 1. Lovejoy's Station September 2–6. Operations against Hood in northern Georgia and northern Alabama September 29-November 3. March to the sea November 15-December 10. Montieth Swamp December 9. Siege of Savannah December 10–21. Campaign of the Carolinas January to April, 1865. Reconnaissance to the Salkehatchie River, S. C., January 20. Skirmishes at Rivers and Broxton Bridges, Salkehatchie River, February 2. Actions at Rivers Bridge, Salkehatchie River, February 3. Binnaker's Bridge, South Edisto River, February 9. Orangeburg, North Edisto River, February 12–13. Columbia February 16–17. Juniper Creek, near Cheraw, March 3. Battle of Bentonville, N.C., March 19–20. Occupation of Goldsboro March 24. Advance on Raleigh April 10–14. Occupation of Raleigh April 14. Bennett's House April 26. Surrender of Johnston and his army. March to Washington, D.C., via Richmond, Va., April 29-May 30. Grand Review of the Armies May 24. Moved to Louisville, Ky., June.

== Casualties ==
The regiment lost a total of 256 men during service; 4 officers and 61 enlisted men killed or mortally wounded, 2 officers and 189 enlisted men died of disease.

== Commanders ==
- Colonel Joseph L. Kirby Smith - mortally wounded at the Second Battle of Corinth; died October 12, 1862 (nephew of Edmund Kirby Smith)
- Colonel Wager Swayne - commanded the regiment following Kirby Smith's death.

== Notable members ==
- Colonel Wager Swayne - Medal of Honor recipient for action at the Battle of Corinth (rank at the time was lieutenant colonel)

== See also ==
- List of Ohio Civil War units
- Ohio in the Civil War
