= Alma Mater (New York sculpture) =

Sculpture by Daniel Chester French

Coordinates: 40°48′28.2″N 73°57′43.7″W

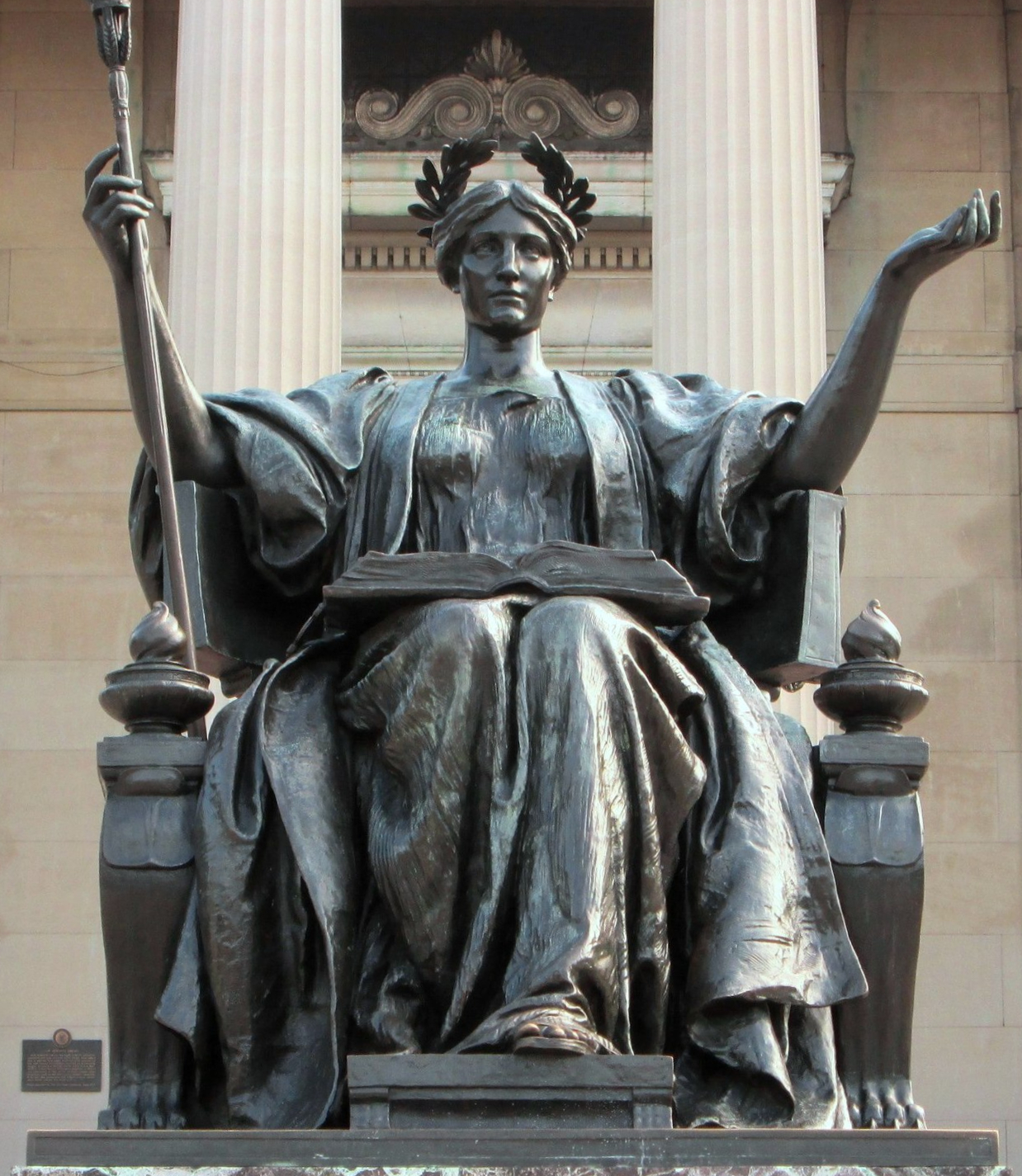
- Alma Mater in 2014
- Artist: Daniel Chester French
- Year: 1903
- Medium: Bronze
- Dimensions: 2.6 m × 1.7 m × 1.9 m (8.5 ft × 5.7 ft × 6.2 ft)
- Location: Manhattan, New York City, U.S.
- Owner: Columbia University

Alma Mater is a bronze sculpture by Daniel Chester French which is located on the steps of the Low Memorial Library on the campus of Columbia University, in the Morningside Heights neighborhood of Manhattan, New York City. French designed the statue in 1901, and it was installed in September 1903. It is a personification of the alma mater, which represents Columbia in its role as an educational institution; since its installation, the statue has become closely associated with the image of the university.

== History ==
=== Commission and installation ===
A plaster model of the first design of Alma Mater in 1900

Plans for a statue in front of Low Memorial Library began upon the completion of the building in 1897. When Charles Follen McKim, the building's main architect, designed a set of stairs that would lead up to the building, he included an empty granite pedestal in the middle on which a statue might sit. Only three years later, Harriette W. Goelet offered the Trustees of Columbia, on behalf of herself and her children, up to $25,000 ($967,500 in 2025) to install "a bronze statue representing 'Alma Mater,' to be placed upon [said] pedestal" in memory of her husband, Columbia College alumnus Robert Goelet, who had died in 1899.

The Trustees accepted her proposition, and with McKim's recommendation commissioned Daniel Chester French to create the statue. Until this point, notable works of French's had included The Minute Man (1874) in Concord, Massachusetts and John Harvard (1884) at Harvard University. He also sculpted The Republic for the World's Columbian Exposition, a statue which would come to bear a strong resemblance to Alma Mater. It has been speculated that Audrey Munson, who was a prolific artist's model during the early 20th century, may have been the basis for the statue, though it is more likely that the model for Alma Mater was actually Mary Lawton, an actress and a friend of French. Given the commission, French's stated aim was to create "a figure that should be gracious in the impression that it should make, with an attitude of welcome to the youths who should choose Columbia as their College."

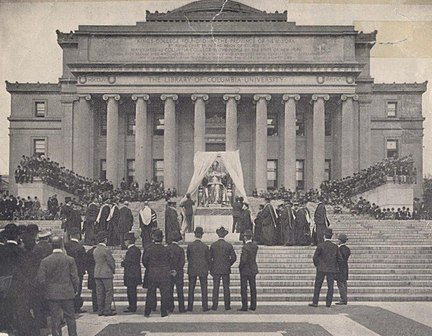
The unveiling of Alma Mater in September 1903

French went through several designs: the original plaster model he made for Alma Mater showed her with her hands in her lap, with her left hand holding the book that lay on it, and her heels touching. Though Goelet and President Seth Low were "greatly delighted" by French's first draft, their critiques led French to change her arms to be outstretched and holding a scepter.

His final design for the statue was approved on March 4, 1901, by the Trustees, and the price to be paid by the Goelets was determined to be $20,000 ($774,000 in 2025). McKim, who was greatly worried about the quality of the statue given its prominent location in front of Low Library, was reportedly "delighted", describing the statue as "dignified, classic and stately... exhibiting as much perception of the spirit and freedom of the Greek as any modern can."

Despite expectations that the statue might be completed in time for the university's 1902 commencement ceremony, delays in French's work (in part due to critiques from Augustus Saint-Gaudens, but largely due to strikes at the Jno. Williams, Inc. foundry) postponed the unveiling until September 23, 1903, the first day of classes for the 1903–1904 school year. At the ceremony, a prayer was given by Henry C. Potter, the 7th Bishop of New York and a trustee of the university, before the statue was formally presented to President Nicholas Murray Butler by Dean John Howard Van Amringe. The Goelets were not in attendance, having departed for Europe earlier.

In 1904, a four-foot plaster reproduction of Alma Mater was borrowed by the university from French to be displayed at the Grand Sculpture Court of the St. Louis World's Fair. However, the university neglected to return it until it was rediscovered in the basement of Low Library and sent to French's daughter, Margaret French Cresson, in 1950.

=== Later history ===
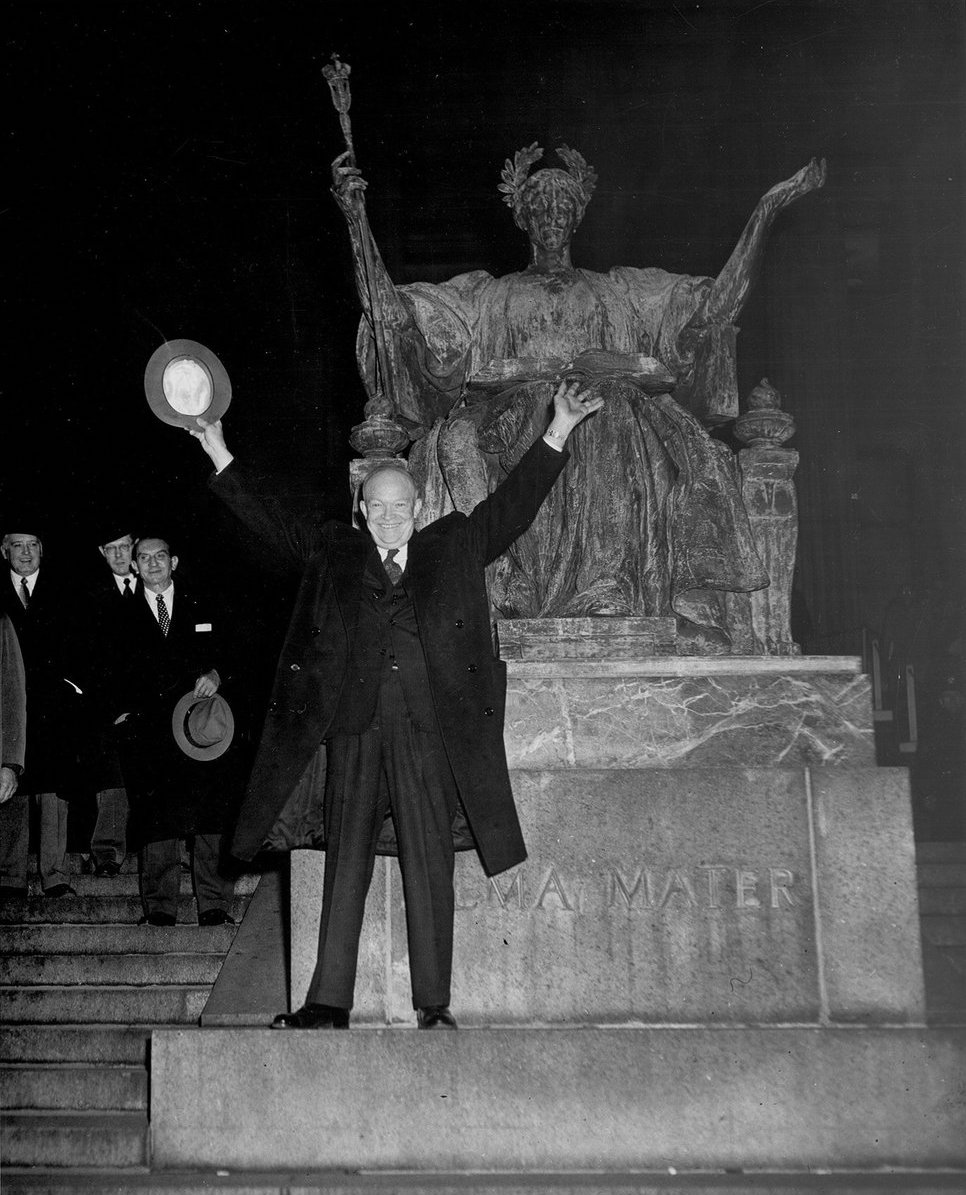
U.S. president-elect Dwight D. Eisenhower posing in front of Alma Mater in January 1953

Alma Mater, given its symbolic connection with the university, has been at the center of many protests at Columbia. During the student protests in 1970 in reaction to the Cambodian campaign and the Kent State shootings, the statue came to represent the failures of the university's administration, which included the continued gentrification of the Morningside Heights neighborhood. In the early morning hours of May 15, 1970, a bomb was planted on the statue. The resulting explosion caused significant damage to Alma Mater's throne. The damage remained until 1978, when the statue was removed from Columbia, the throne was recast, and the sculpture was cleaned, refinished with a new patina, and returned to the Low steps.

Other noteworthy instances of protest involving Alma Mater include during the Columbia University protests of 1968, when the statue was routinely vandalized and a sign which read "Raped by the cops" was placed on Alma Mater's lap, and during the protests against the Iraq War, when students draped a black shroud over Alma Mater's head and connected wires from her hands to the ground in reference to the Abu Ghraib torture and prisoner abuse scandal.

Alma Mater has also been at the center of many pranks, including one instance in 1928 when the crown atop her scepter was stolen (and later returned), as well as in October 1984, when the scepter was removed in its entirety by Cornell students. It appeared on the doorstep of the Dean of Students of Cornell in a shoebox two months later, and was returned to the university by hand by a Cornell professor the next day. In retaliation for the theft, the Ezra Cornell statue on Cornell's campus was doused in Columbia blue paint soon after the return of the scepter.

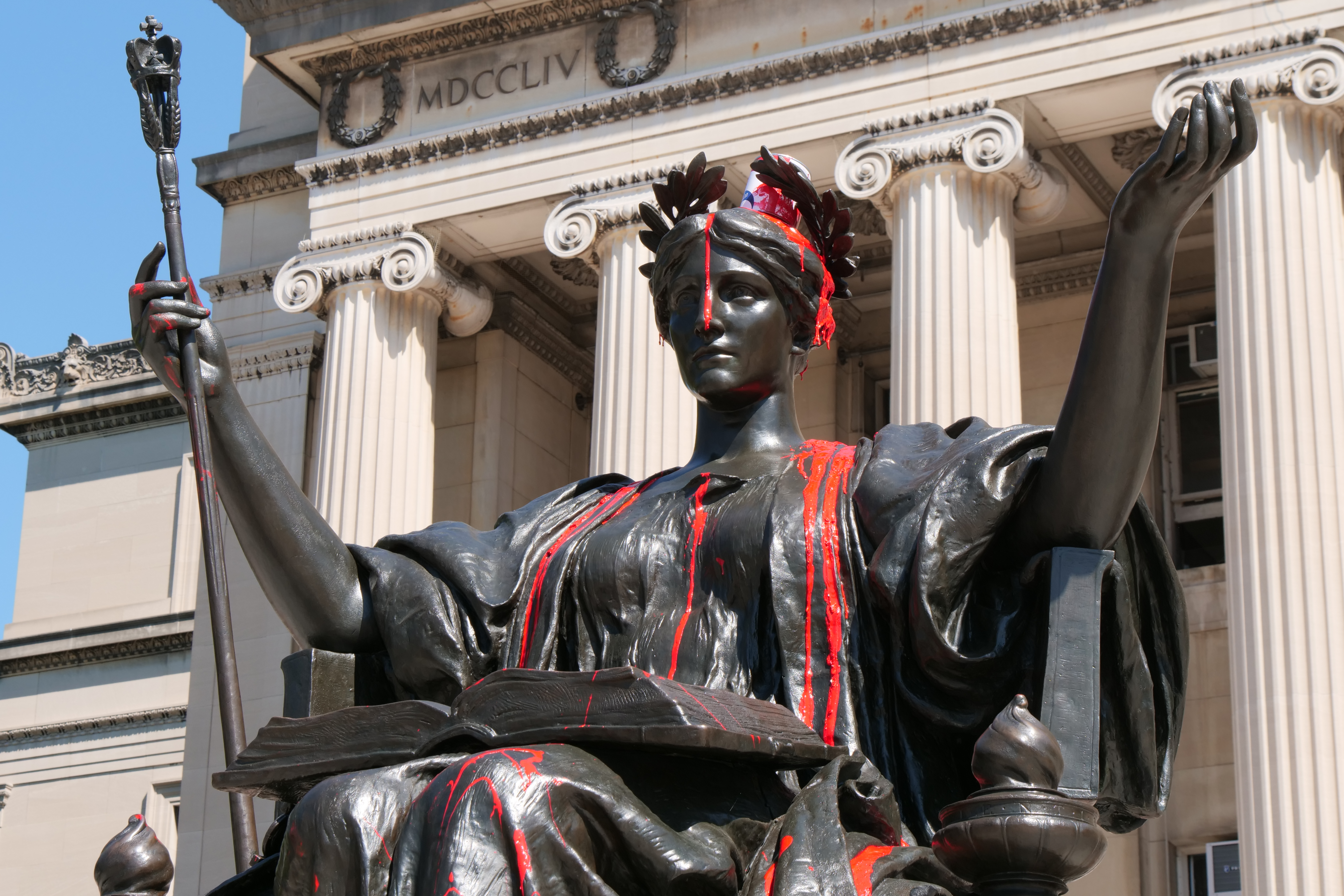
Alma Mater covered with red paint on the first day of classes of the fall 2024 semester, in the context of the protest movement at the university during the Gaza war and genocide.

On September 3, 2024, on the first day of classes after a semester of the Gaza Solidarity Encampment of 2023 and the ongoing protests movement during the Gaza war and genocide, the Alma Mater statue was doused with red paint.

== Reception ==
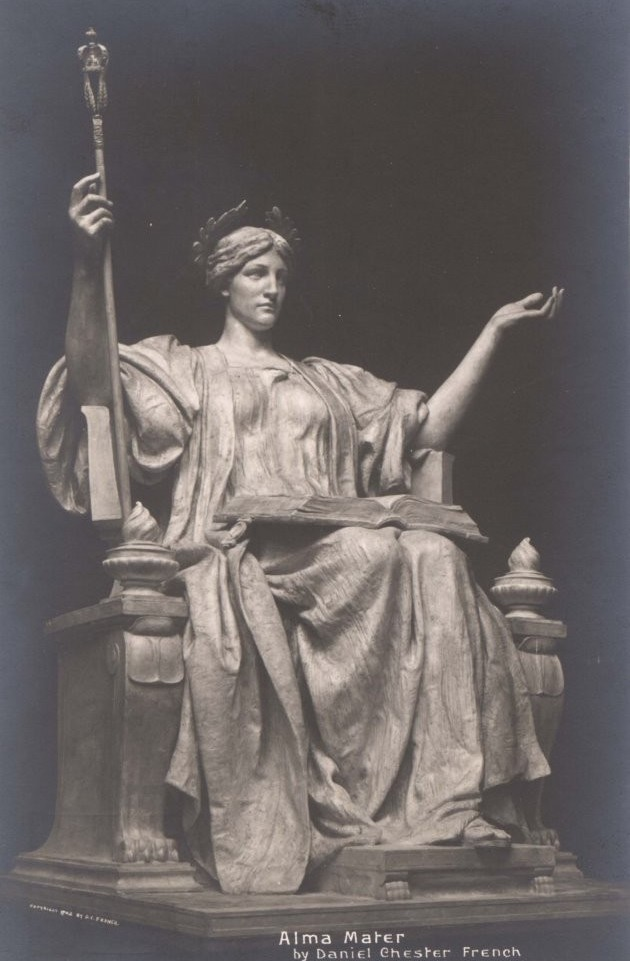
Photogravure of Alma Mater, 1907

Alma Mater was largely praised upon its unveiling. The Columbia Daily Spectator described the statue as "characterized by a queenly dignity and repose", and stated that it "expresses the highest type of intellectual womanhood. In pose and gesture she invites the student of the University and gives him the welcome of Alma Mater." The New York Times, though it did not comment directly on the artistic merits of the work, recognized that the sculpture was "for technical reasons an extraordinarily difficult piece of work."

Frank Leslie's Illustrated Newspaper called the work "French's masterpiece of sculpture", while The Catholic Union compared the figure of Alma Mater to the Virgin Mary, incorrectly claiming that the work was an imitation of a "Mother of Christ" statue in Bonn, Germany, exclaiming, "How closely is not the Catholic Church associated with all that is noble and tender in the mind and heart of man!" However, French was reportedly unsatisfied with the amount of attention the sculpture initially received, stating that it did not make a "ripple on the surface of New York".

In 1903, Charles Henry Caffin praised Alma Mater as "beautiful... unquestionably", though not necessarily one of French's best works. He described her as follows:

The face is of a familiar type of American beauty, corresponding with the very modern suggestion of the whole figure. Yet the sculptor has invested the head with an air of dispassionate refinement which gives it a certain aloofness; scarcely more, however, than the self-possession, consciously unconscious, with which the American woman can carry her beauty. It is almost as if one of them had mounted the pedestal and, with a ready wit embracing the situation, were enacting the part of patroness to the university. Every student will love her and her influence will be altogether one of sweet nobility... [Alma Mater] is distinguished by a pure and poignant serenity, by a monumental feeling penetrated with a sort of gentle sprightliness; for the expression which he puts into the modeling of the limbs can scarcely be characterized by a word of more sensitive application.

More recently, The New York Times has dubbed Alma Mater the "grand old lady" of Columbia University, who "reigns in queenly splendor in front of Low Library." The AIA Guide to New York City described it as "an evocative statue" where "the enthroned figure extends her hand in welcome as she looks up from the mighty tome of knowledge lying open in her lap." Alma Mater's placement in front of Low Library in particular has been praised for its role in welcoming students to the university and highlighting the university's relationship with the city of New York. As Professor of Historic Preservation Andrew Dolkart notes:

After passing Alma Mater and reaching the campus level, the seeker must climb an even longer stairway, symbolically a "stairway to knowledge," to reach the entrance to the library. From the top of the stairs, members of the select Columbia community could turn and look out over New York, secure in the belief that they were contributing to the rapid transformation of their city into a world center of intellectual and professional endeavor.

== Design ==
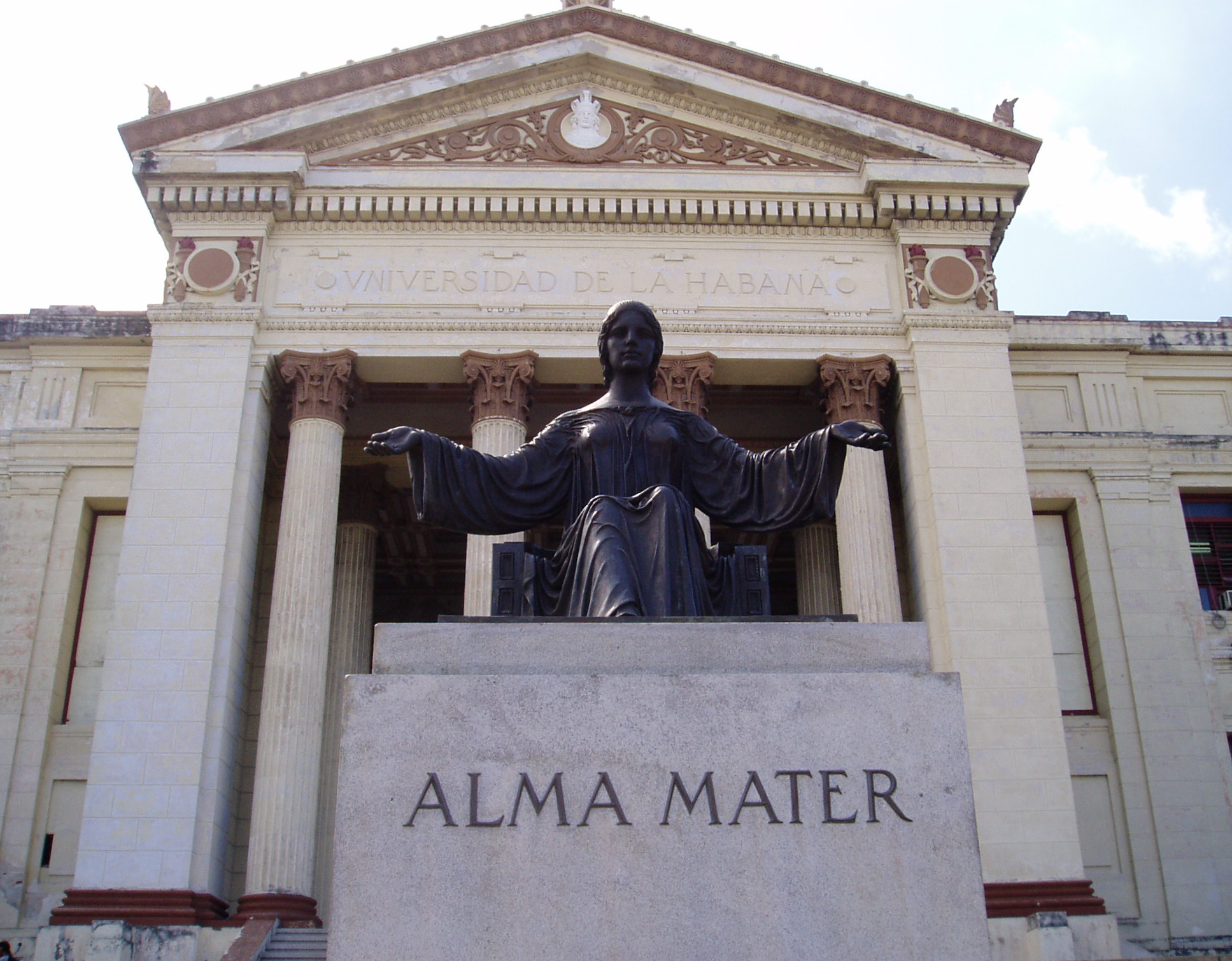
The Alma Mater statue of the University of Havana in Cuba, which was modeled off of the one at Columbia

The statue represents a personification of the traditional image of the university as an alma mater, or "nourishing mother", draped in an academic gown and seated on a throne. She wears a laurel wreath on her head and holds in her right hand a scepter made of four sprays of wheat which are capped by a King's Crown, a traditional symbol of the university. A book, representing learning, rests on her lap. The arms of her throne end in lamps, representing "Sapientia et Doctrina", or "Wisdom and Learning"; on the back of the throne is embossed an image of the seal of the university.

An owl, a symbol of knowledge and learning, is hidden in the folds of Alma Mater's cloak near her left leg. There has been some speculation on the exact meaning of the owl, including by history professor Dwight C. Miner, who believed that the owl was a reference to the Psi Upsilon fraternity, of which Miner believed French to have been a member.

In 1953, French's daughter, Margaret French Cresson, clarified in a letter to The New York Times that it "represents no fraternity and poses no labyrinthine riddle. The owl is the age-old symbol of wisdom and was used by the sculptor to convey that interpretation." She also clarified that the statue was not a depiction of Pallas Athena or Minerva, but simply a personification of the university.

When Alma Mater was originally installed it was gilded, although the original gilding wore away with time. In the late 1920s, French suggested re-gilding the statue, though this was not done; the few remaining flakes of gold were removed in 1950 in order to catalyze the statue's patina. In 1962, the university made the decision to apply a new bronze veneer. However, after protests, including by President Grayson L. Kirk, the new finish was removed and the patina restored. In 2002, the statue was restored again, changing her more uniform green patina hue to the green and brown mix that is seen today.

The design of Alma Mater inspired a 1919 statue of the same name at the University of Havana in Cuba by Mario Korbel, who had lived in New York City from 1913 to 1917. The Alma Mater statue at the University of Illinois Urbana-Champaign may have been inspired by Columbia's Alma Mater, according to its sculptor, Lorado Taft.

== See also ==
- Public sculptures by Daniel Chester French
