= 37 Wall Street =

Residential skyscraper in Manhattan, New York

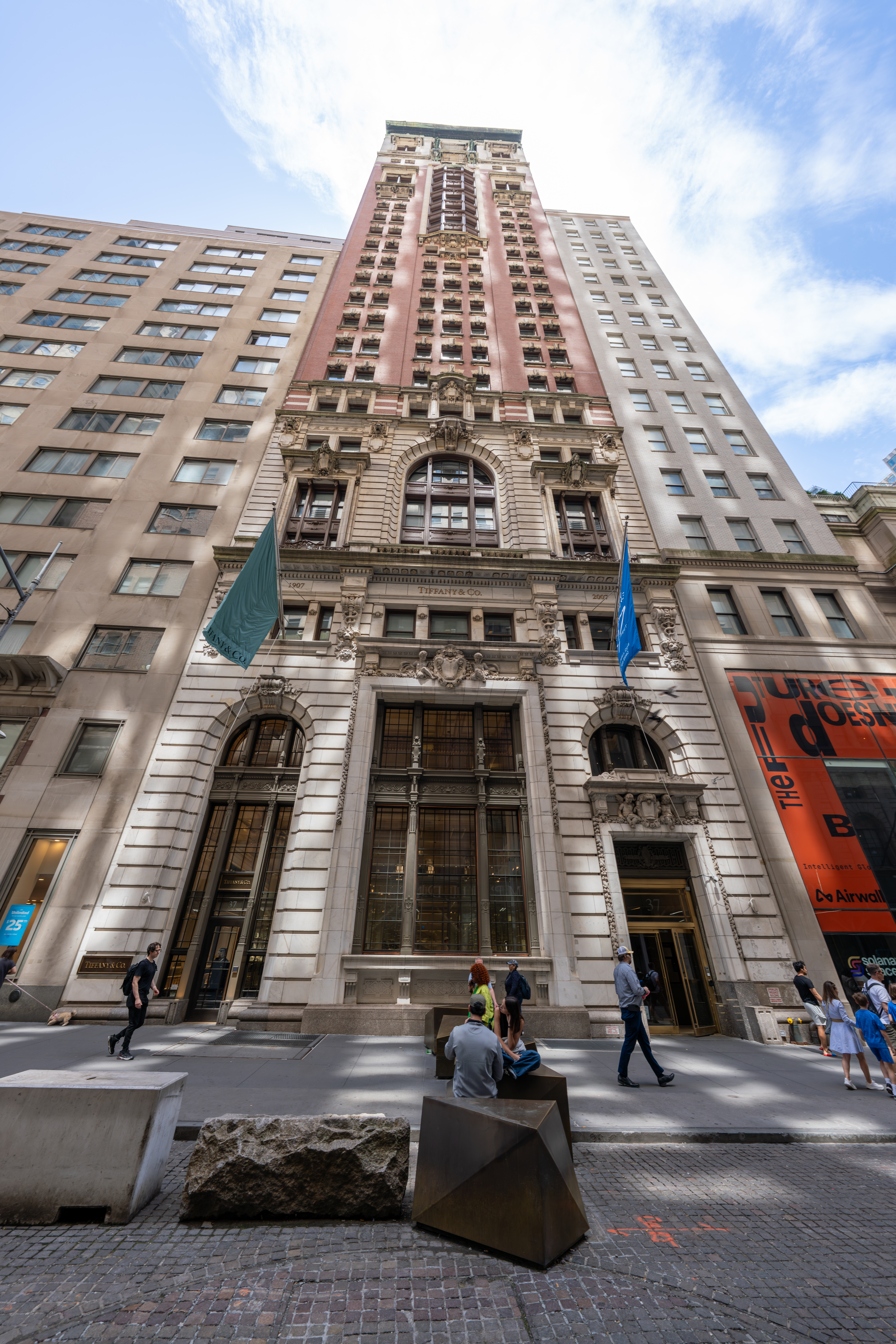
- Interactive map of the 37 Wall Street area

General information
- Location: Manhattan, New York City
- Coordinates: 40.706565°N 74.010301°W
- Construction started: 1906
- Opened: 1907

Design and construction
- Architect: Francis Kimball

37 Wall Street is a luxury apartment building on Wall Street in the heart of the Financial District in Lower Manhattan, New York City.

== History ==
It was designed by Francis Kimball and constructed during 1906–1907 for The Trust Company of America, which occupied the ground floor. The building, completed in 1907, stands at 25 floors, plus a penthouse level that includes apartments and a terrace. No longer offices, the building has been converted/restored by Costas Kondylis. It is now 373 rental apartments and a 7,700-square-foot (720 m^{2}) commercial space for Tiffany & Co's return to Lower Manhattan. The amenities for its residents include a well-equipped gym, a lounge with pool tables and a screening room, as well as the roof-top terrace.

== Gallery ==
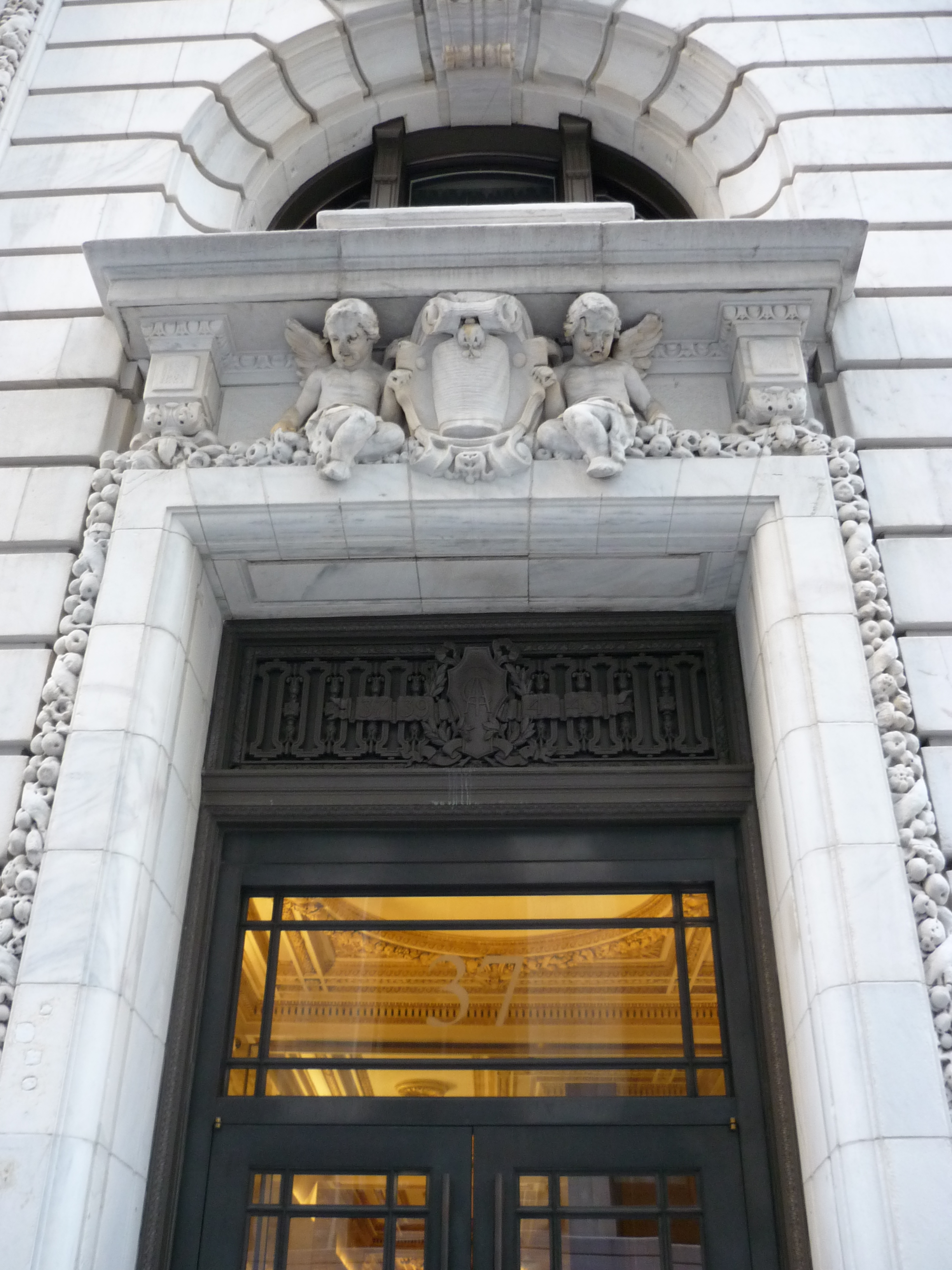

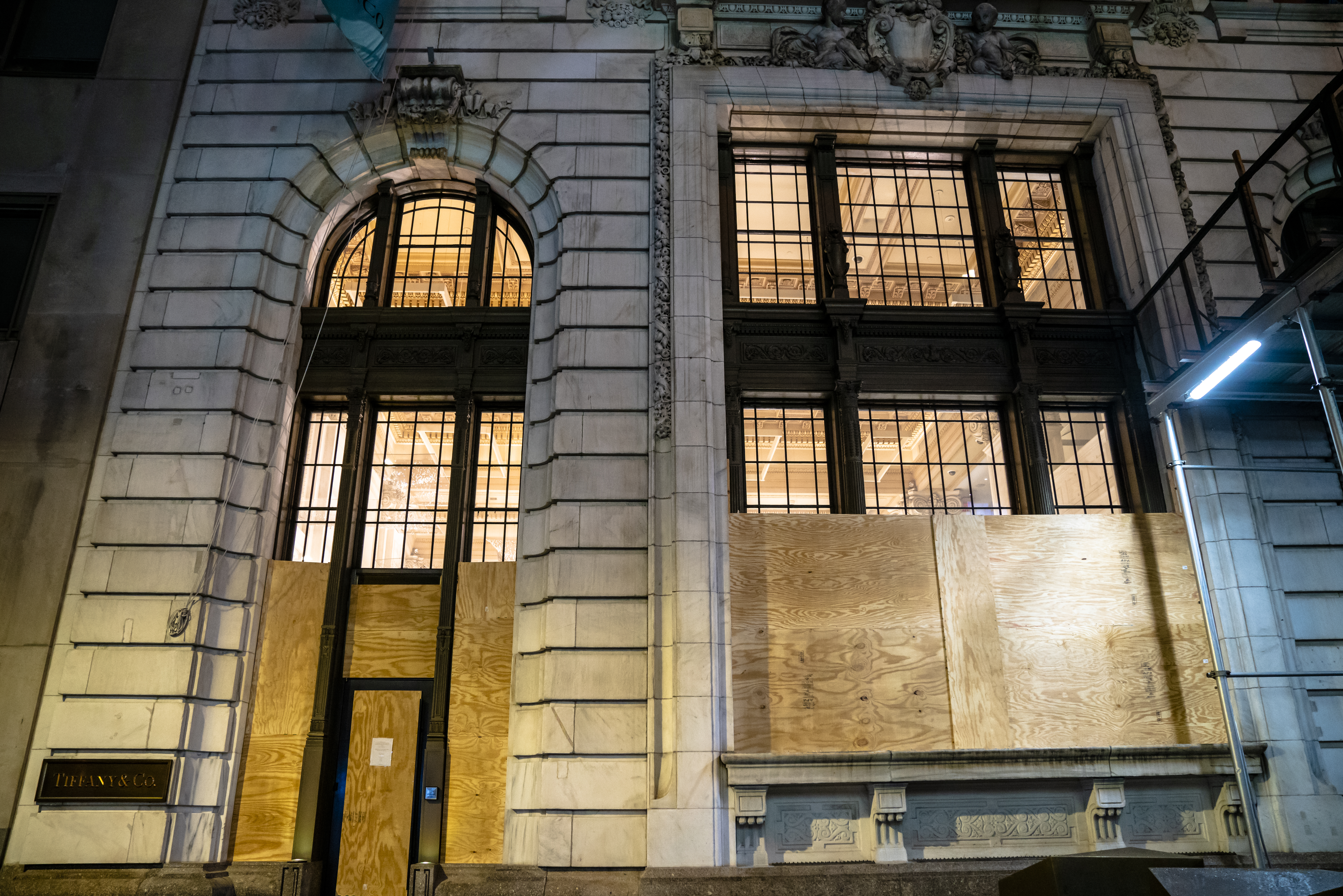

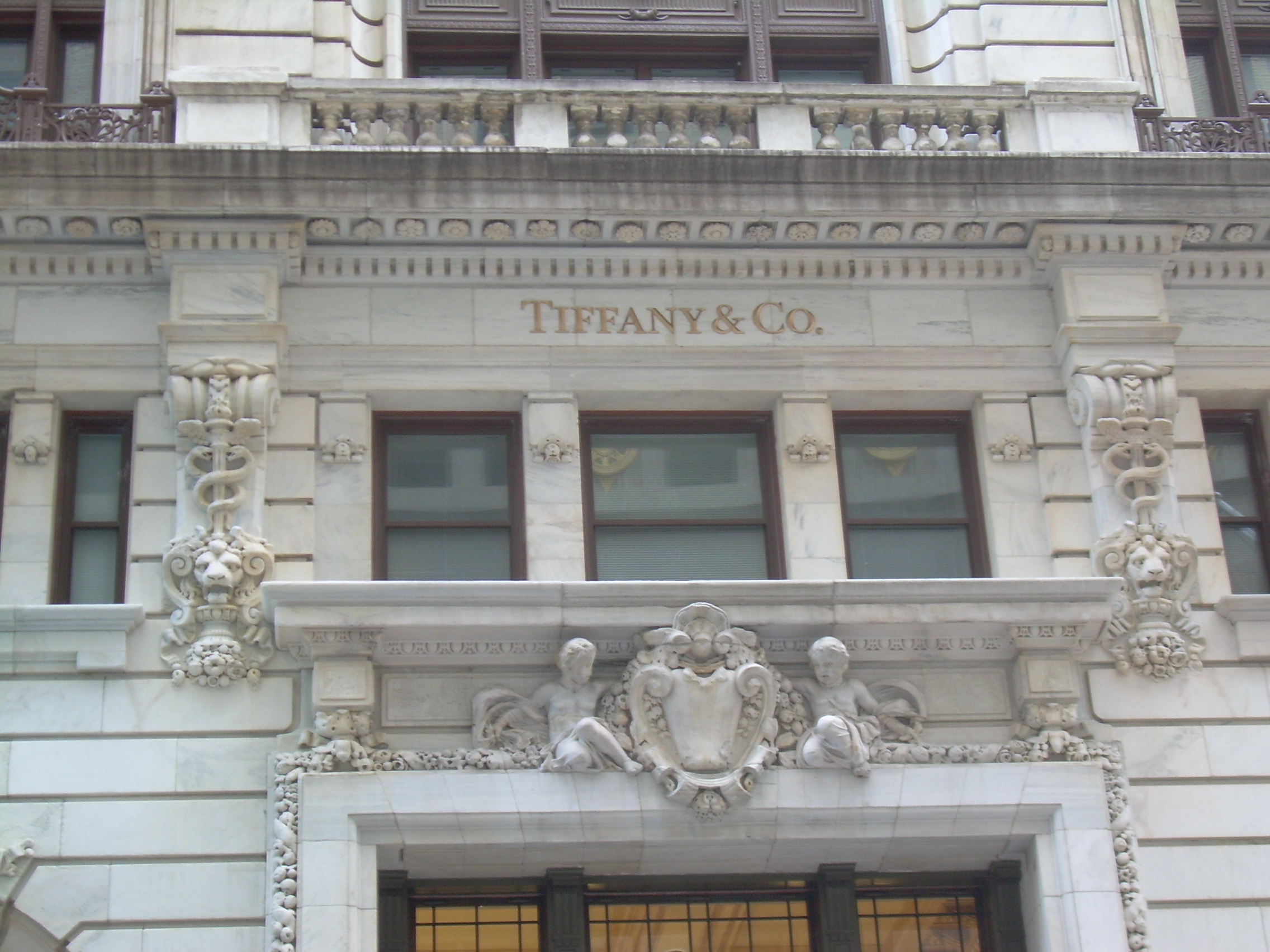

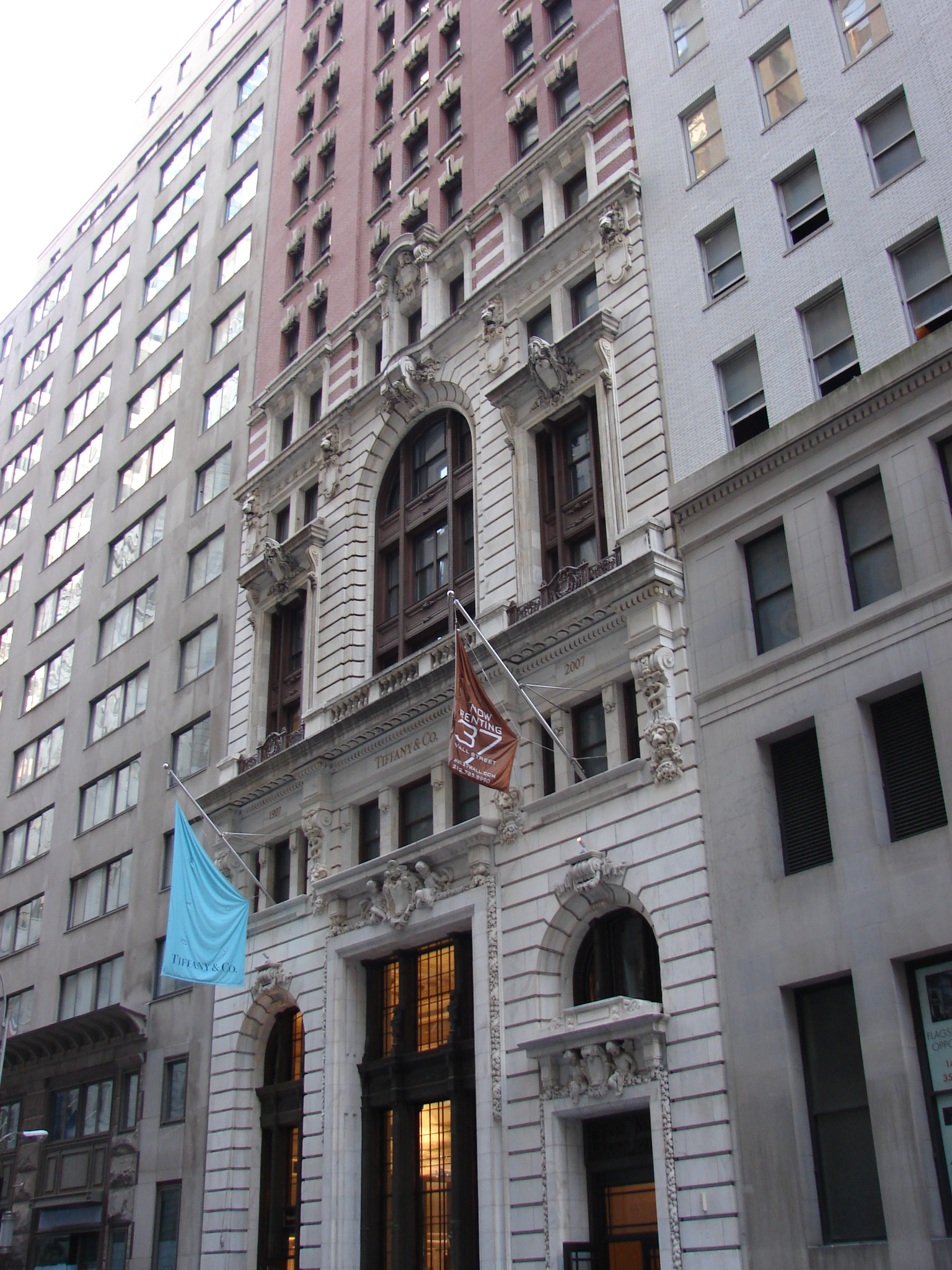

== Sources ==
- "Wilf brings Tiffany to 7,700 s/f space at 37 Wall Street". Real Estate Weekly. 52 (46). June 28, 2006. Archived from the original on October 14, 2007 – via FindArticles.
- Leasing website
