= American Light and Traction =

- Type: Defunct Corporation
- Industry: Energy
- Founded: 1900
- Headquarters: Detroit, Michigan
- Key people: Emerson McMillin (founder and president)
- Products: Electricity and natural gas

American Light and Traction was founded in 1900 for the purpose for consolidating the utility industry's small, local power suppliers. By 1901, American Light and Traction owned and controlled over 40 gas producing plants, electric light and traction (streetcar) properties.

== History ==
- 1900 - founded by Emerson McMillin as president
- 1935 - enactment of Public Utility Holding Act forced break-up of company due to antitrust provisions regulating integrated utility companies
- 1938 - Michigan Consolidated Gas (MichCon) formed
- 1949 - Michigan Consolidated Gas, the Milwaukee Gas Company, the Michigan-Wisconsin Gas Company, the Austin Field Pipeline Company and the Milwaukee Solvay Company merge to become American Natural Gas Company
- 1981 - MichCon becomes wholly owned subsidiary of Primark
- 1988 - spun off
- 2001 - merger with DTE Energy
