= Emerson McMillin =

American financier and banker

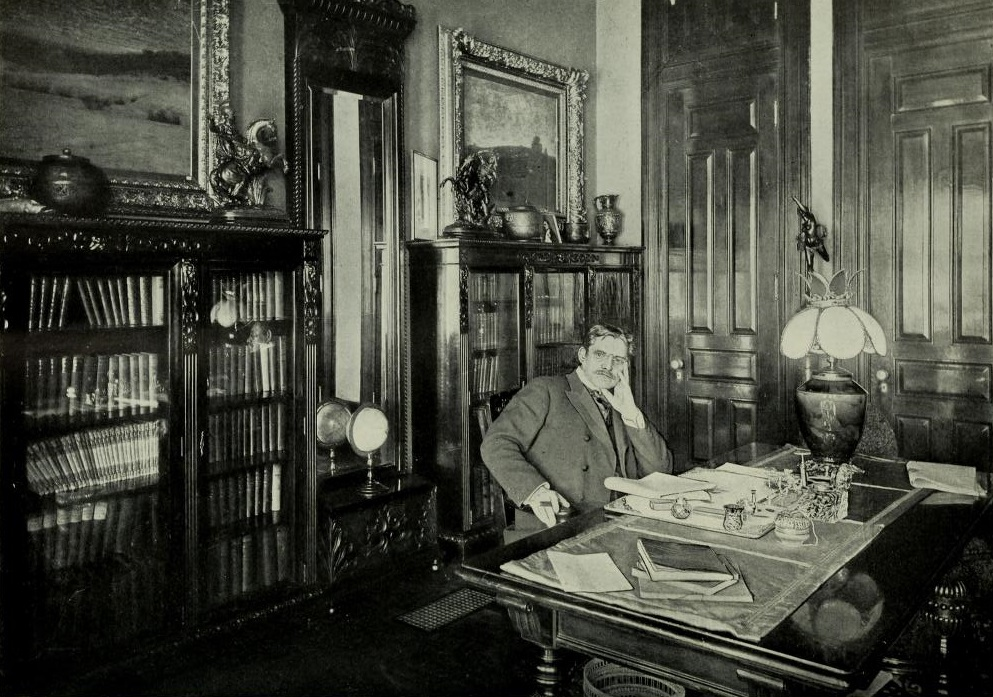
- Born: April 16, 1844; Ewington, Ohio
- Died: May 30, 1922 (aged 78); Mahwah, New Jersey
- Occupation: Head of Emerson McMillin bank

Emerson McMillin (April 16, 1844 - May 30, 1922) was an American financier and banker. The head of the banking house of Emerson McMillin, McMillin won a commission through "gallant conduct under fire" fighting for the Union Army in the Civil War, before moving to the Ohio Valley to work in the iron works and steel industries. He founded American Light and Traction in 1900 and became president.

== Early life ==
He was born on April 16, 1844, in Ewington, Ohio. His family was of Scottish heritage, and had initially settled in Virginia. He was the twelfth of fourteen children, and went to school several months a year until the age of ten. His father was the manager of an iron furnace and Emerson worked as an iron furnace apprentice for four years starting at age 12, in 1856. He acquired a good education with hard study after-hours, with a particular interest in scientific research. The Times wrote that he "made a practice of thoroughly examining the application of the scientific principles of the iron and gas industries."

== Career ==
=== Military activity ===
Devoutly anti-slavery unlike his father, he attempted to sign up for the American Civil War at the age of seventeen. Rejected for his age, when he turned 18 he signed up for the 18th Ohio Infantry Regiment. He served in the Union Army starting in 1862. He was wounded three times in the war, while other sources say he was wounded five times. He served in 38 battles. In the war, McMillin and his brothers were known as the "fighting McMillins," Of his five brothers, three were killed in the conflict. McMillin himself won a commission through "gallant conduct under fire."

=== Business ===
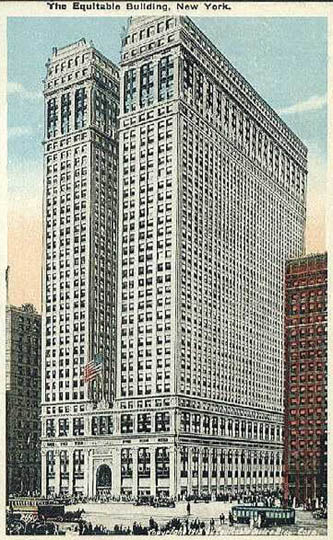
The banking house of Emerson McMillin Co. was at 120 Broadway.

He worked for ten years in the Ohio Valley in iron works and steel mills. In Ohio, he became manager or president of several institutions, and afterwards focused his energies on gas properties and their consolidation and growth. In 1891, he started a commercial bank involved in mergers and acquisitions in the industry. The Times wrotes that the bank's focus was "of a sort then rather new in banking circles," because of its focus on the purchase and merging of gas interests. He believed in consolidating competitors as a business strategy, for example causing the merger in St. Louis of four gas companies, increasing their net profit significantly.

Among his other positions, he was president of the Columbus Street Railway Company in Columbus, Ohio, where he lived for some time. After having moved to New York City, he resigned as president on April 14, 1898, due to a "diversity of business connections in other localities," although he retained other interests in Columbus, including gas interests. He founded the American Light and Traction in 1900 for the purpose for consolidating the utility industry's small, local power suppliers, and also became president. By 1901, American Light and Traction owned and controlled over 40 gas producing plants, electric light and traction (streetcar) properties.

In 1922, although he had experienced two years of poor health, he remained head of the banking house of Emerson McMillin Co. at the Equitable Building, 120 Broadway, chairman of the American Light and Traction Company, and president of "a dozen other lighting and traction concerns throughout the country."

== Philanthropy and civic efforts ==
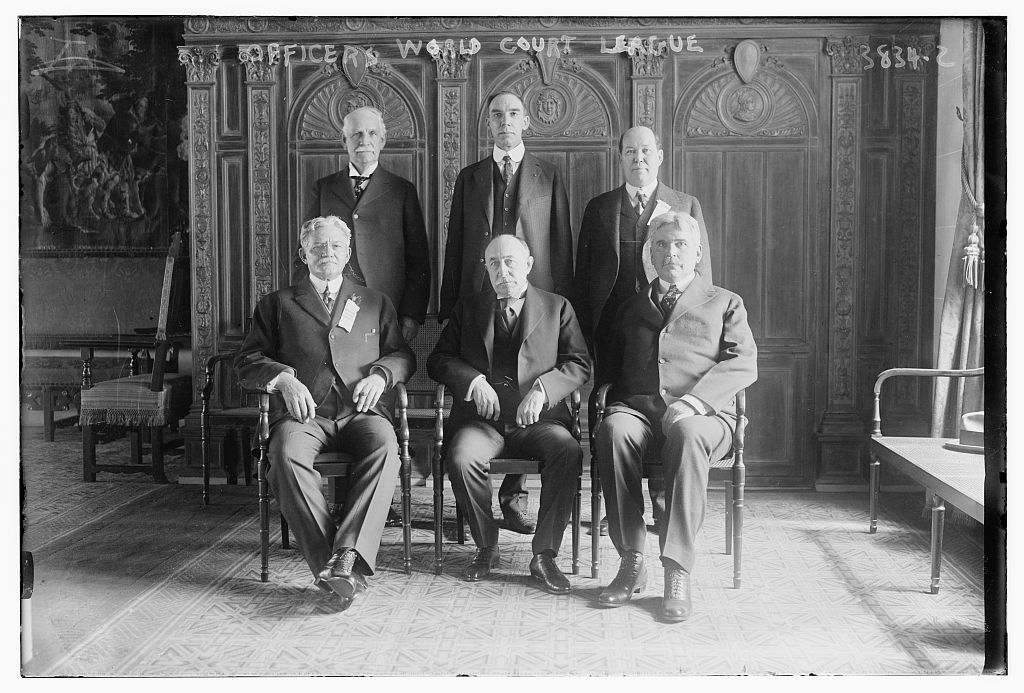
World's Court League in 1916, with McMillin seated on the left next to Henry Riggs Rathbone.

He supported a number of civic projects with his own funds, for example the Arbitration Society of the Americas to allow for the arbitration of civic disputes outside a court. He served as president of the organization. In 1915, he was at the first meeting of the World's Court League, and was appointed vice president. McMillin provided initial funding in 1916 for the founding of Columbia Business School in New York.

== Personal life ==
McMillin married Isabel Morgan and she died after his death in 1922. They had four children: Marion McMillin, Estelle McMillin Traverso, Maud McMillin, Emerson McMillin II.

Following George Crocker's death in 1909, McMillin bought his 1907 home, the Crocker Mansion, a 45,000-square-foot (4,200 m^{2}) house at Mahwah, New Jersey, designed by the architect James Brite. He was an art collector of "unusual discernment," and Thomas E. Kirby described McMillin's painting collection sold in January 1913 as the finest collection of American and foreign pictures ever sold in the United States. At the 1913 sale, his Orpheus and Eurydice by Jean-Baptiste-Camille Corot was sold for $75,200.

McMillin died of pneumonia on May 30, 1922, in Mahwah, New Jersey. In late October 1924, the furnishings from the Crocker-McMillin mansion were auctioned, with profits reaching $185,000 on the third day of sales. Among the items were rare paintings and rugs. His grandson, Emerson McMillin 3d, died in New York at the age of 41 in 1935, and was survived by his mother Baroness Traverso of Florence, Italy, and his wife Olga Kohler McMillin of the Hotel St. Regis.

== See also ==
- List of bank mergers
- McMillin Observatory
- Crocker-McMillin Mansion
