= Ewington, Ohio =

Unincorporated community in Ohio, U.S.

Coordinates: 39°00′34″N 82°21′11″W

Ewington is an unincorporated community in Gallia County, in the U.S. state of Ohio.

== History ==
Ewington was platted in 1852 by George Ewing, and named for his father William "Swago Bill" Ewing. A post office called Ewington was established in 1850, and remained in operation until 1984.
