= Walter W. Law =

English businessman and the founder of Briarcliff Manor, New York

Walter William Law
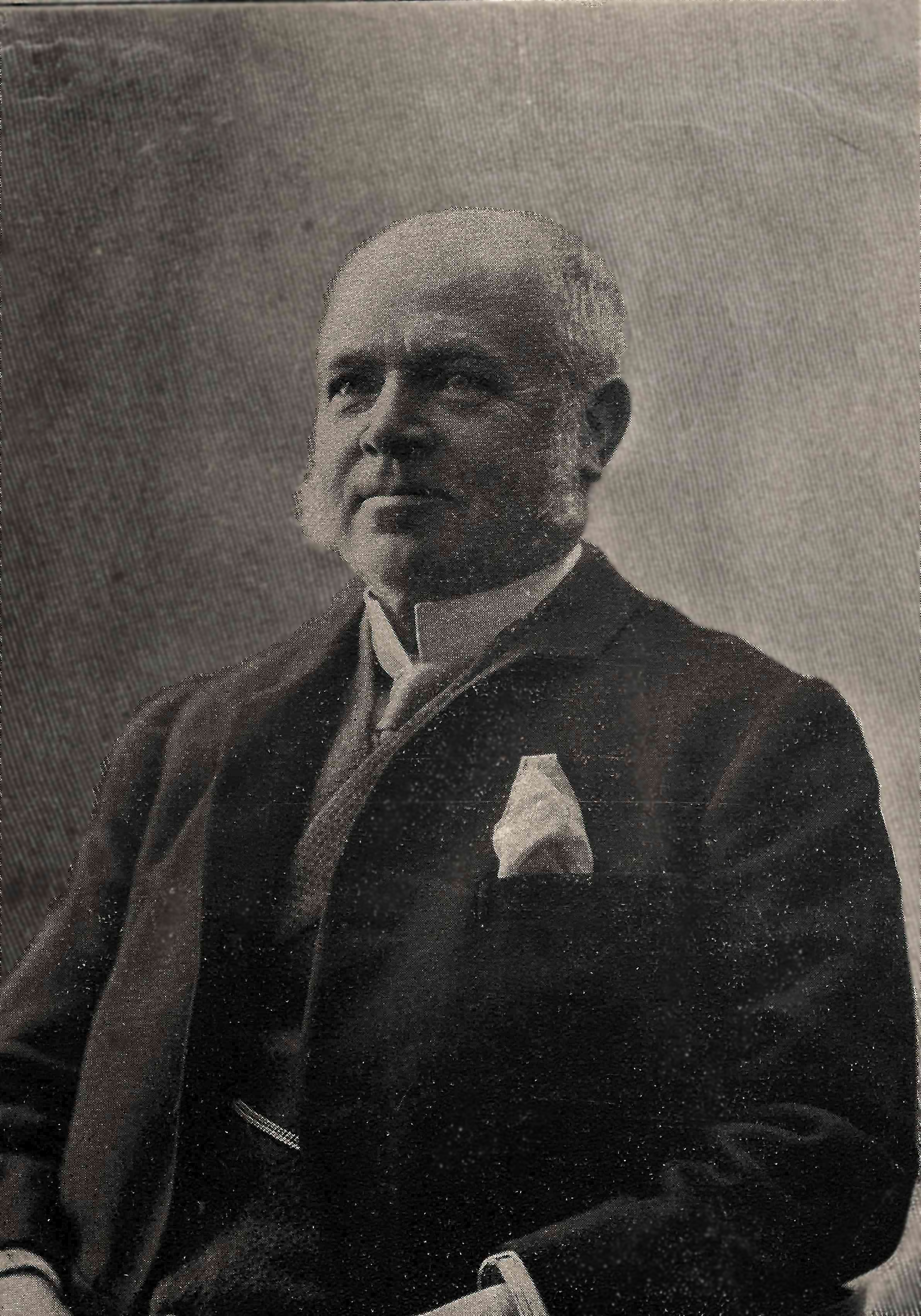
- Walter Law c. 1910
- Born: Walter William Law; November 13, 1837; Kidderminster, England
- Died: January 17, 1924 (aged 86); Summerville, South Carolina, United States
- Resting place: Woodlawn Cemetery
- Occupation: Businessman
- Employer: W. & J. Sloane
- Known for: Founding Briarcliff Manor
- Spouse: Georgianna Ransom Law (m. 1866; died 1910)
- Children: Georgia R. Penman; Carrie Law-Fotterall; Walter W. Law Jr.; Edith Bird Brockelman; Henry Herbert Law; Arthur Law; Martha Janet Macey
- Parent(s): John and Elizabeth Bird Law

Walter William Law (Note: Walter Law was sometimes referred to as Walter William Law Sr., to distinguish him from his son.) (November 13, 1837 – January 17, 1924) was a businessman and the founder of the 8,000-person village of Briarcliff Manor, New York. He was a vice president of furniture and carpet retailer W. & J. Sloane, and later founded the Briarcliff Lodge, the Briarcliff Table Water Company, Briarcliff Farms, and the Briarcliff Greenhouses. He founded or assisted in establishing several schools, churches, and parks in the village, and rebuilt its train station in 1906. In the early 1900s, Walter Law was the largest individual landholder in Westchester County. (Note: John D. and William Rockefeller together owned more land in the county than Law.)

Walter Law was born in Kidderminster, England, and was one of ten children of a carpet dealer. He relocated to the United States in 1859, where he lived until his death. Throughout his life, he was employed at various places, including at W. & J. Sloane, where he worked for 24 years. After retiring to a house on Scarborough Road in the small community of Whitson's Corners, New York, he developed the surrounding farmland into a suburban village. Law died in 1924 in Summerville, South Carolina, during rest cure treatment.

== Early life ==
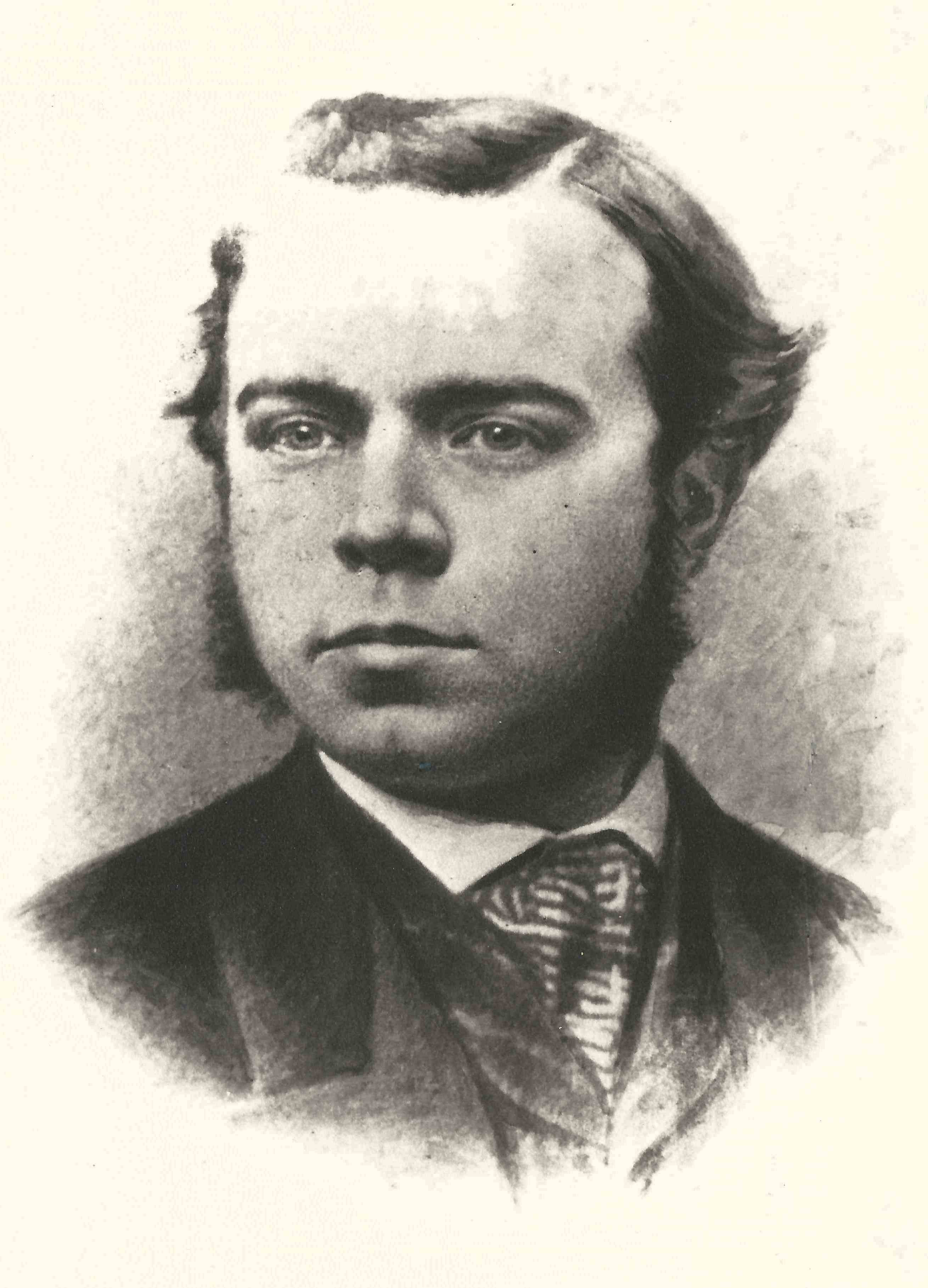
Walter Law c. 1860

Walter Law was born on November 13, 1837, in the English town of Kidderminster. He was one of ten children born to John and Elizabeth Bird Law, who were strict Nonconformists. His father sold carpets and dry goods; at the time, Kidderminster was a center of carpet manufacturing in Britain. Law was educated in private schools in Kidderminster; however, he left school and began working as a cash boy for a draper at the age of fourteen. Shortly after the United Kingdom's election of 1859, the Law family left Kidderminster, many to Australia. That year, Law moved to the United States, having gained an interest in the US after reading about it. He left England with letters of introduction written by his father, which were addressed to friends in the American carpet business; he also had enough money to last for about two weeks. He arrived in New York City on January 22, 1860.

== Career ==
Law originally found a job as a traveling carpet salesman. He continued until he discovered that his employer was misrepresenting domestic rugs as being imported and was also charging premium prices. His next employer, an outfitter of steamships and hotels, went out of business in the 1860s, when the American Civil War affected the business. Law struggled through unemployment, and even while working, pay was low. At one point, Law was employed at a store and was making eight dollars a week.

Later on, Law contacted William Sloane, head of W. & J. Sloane. Sloane hired him more out of kindness than need for employees. In 1866, at the age of 29, Law began work under Sloane with wages of $1 a day. After four years of employment, Walter Law became a partner in the company and later became a trustee for life. Originally, Law mostly worked in retail, but with the Civil War, wholesale demands increased, and Law's time spent working in wholesale increased until he became devoted to it exclusively.

Law first came to Yonkers due to him marketing the products of the Alexander Smith & Sons Carpet Company in Yonkers for the manufacture of moquette carpets. Walter Law increased the business of Sloane's wholesale department by securing their account; he eventually became a stockholder and member of the Yonkers company's board of directors. Law and his wife moved to Hillcrest, at 354 Palisade Avenue in Yonkers, making it easier for him to service the Smith account. He later became a vice president of W. & J. Sloane, and also joined its board of directors.

=== Briarcliff Manor developments ===
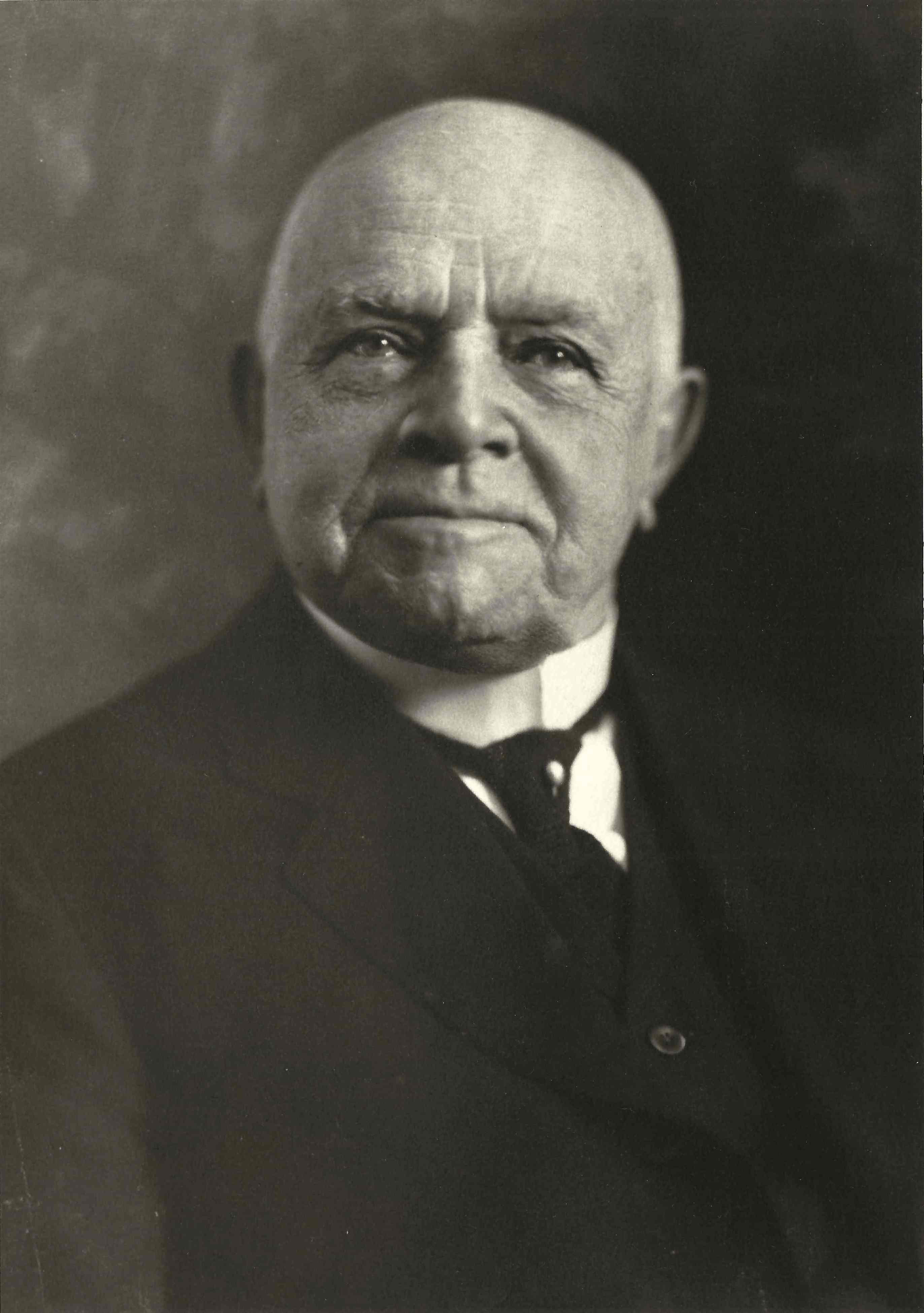
The last photograph taken of Walter Law, in December 1923

If a Cobbler by trade, I'll make it my pride
The best of all Cobblers to be;
And if only a Tinker, no Tinker on earth
Shall mend an old Kettle like me.

— Posted at Dalmeny, and given to Law
by his father when he was eight or nine.

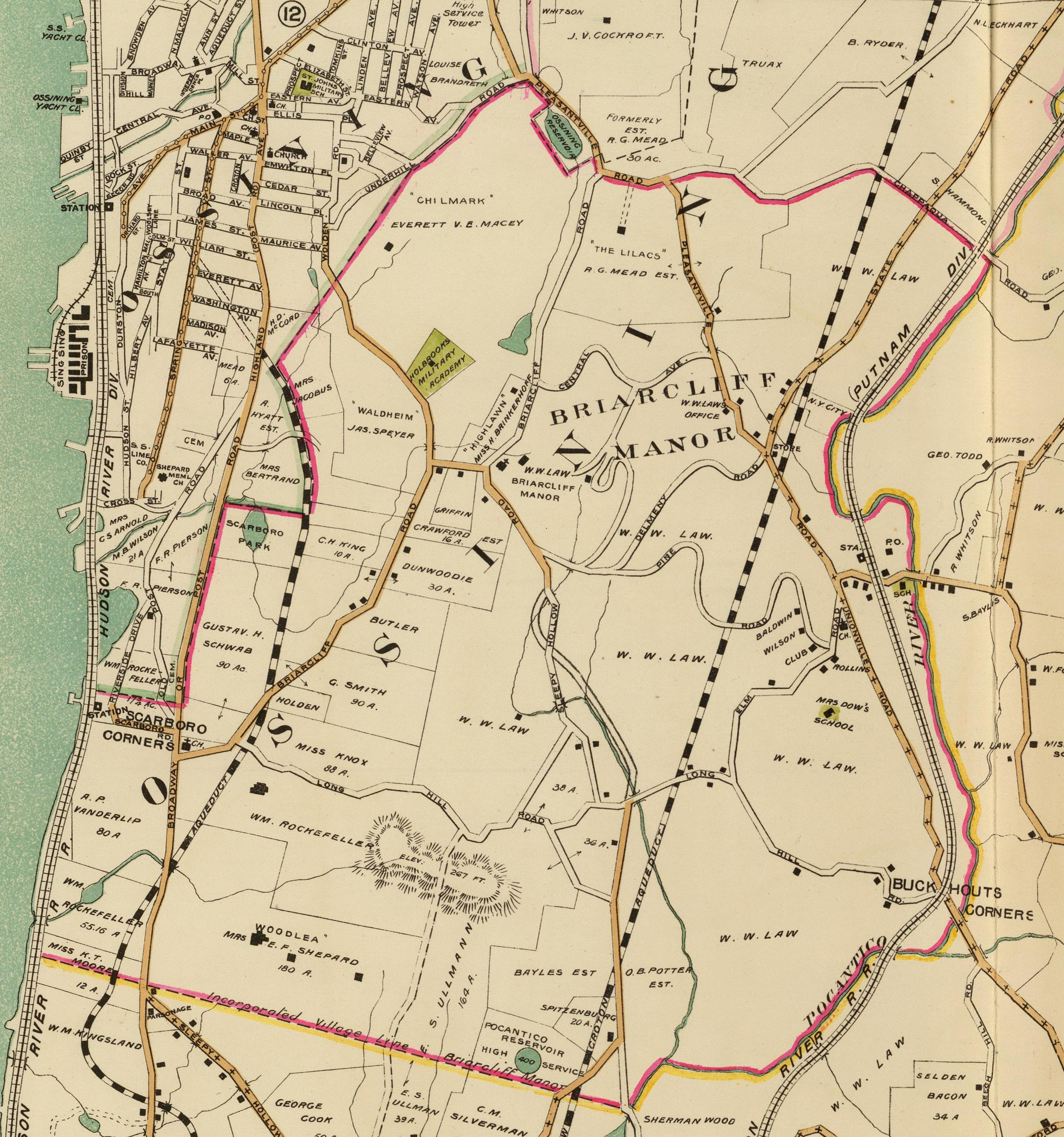
1908 map of Briarcliff Manor showing the numerous large parcels Law owned at the time

In 1890, Walter Law began purchasing property in the present-day village of Briarcliff Manor. That year, Law paid James Stillman $35,000 ($1,254,200 in 2025) for 236 acres (0.4 sq mi) of land in the area; he named the land Briarcliff Farm. In 1898, Law retired from W. & J. Sloane and began devoting his time to his farming. He built an estate, the Manor House, on Scarborough Road in Briarcliff Manor. He later purchased more land, acquiring 5,000 acres by 1900, including land in Yorktown, Millwood, Pound Ridge, and Glenville, Connecticut. Law's farm began with rough farmland, a few cattle, and little knowledge of farming, but it eventually grew. At the farm's peak, Law had 500 workers caring for more than 1,000 cattle, 500 pigs, 4,000 chickens, Thoroughbred horses, pheasants, peacocks and sheep. Law believed that farming can pay off if it utilized scientific principles, and that the farm should find the best markets and hold them by producing the best products.

Around the same time, he established the Briarcliff Table Water Company and the Briarcliff Greenhouses. The water company sold its products in five cities, and owned 250-foot (76 m) wells. Briarcliff Farms was one of the first producers of certified milk in the U.S., and the farm produced about 4,500 US quarts (4,300 litres) of milk daily. Every night, his milk, cream, butter and kumyss was sent to New York City on the New York and Putnam Railroad. Law's greenhouse space grew to 75,000 square feet (7,000 m^{2}), and his roses earned up to $100,000 each year. As many as 8,000 roses were shipped from Briarcliff Greenhouses daily, most of them to New York City. In 1902, Law built the Briarcliff Lodge on the highest point of his estate; it was the first hotel in Westchester County.

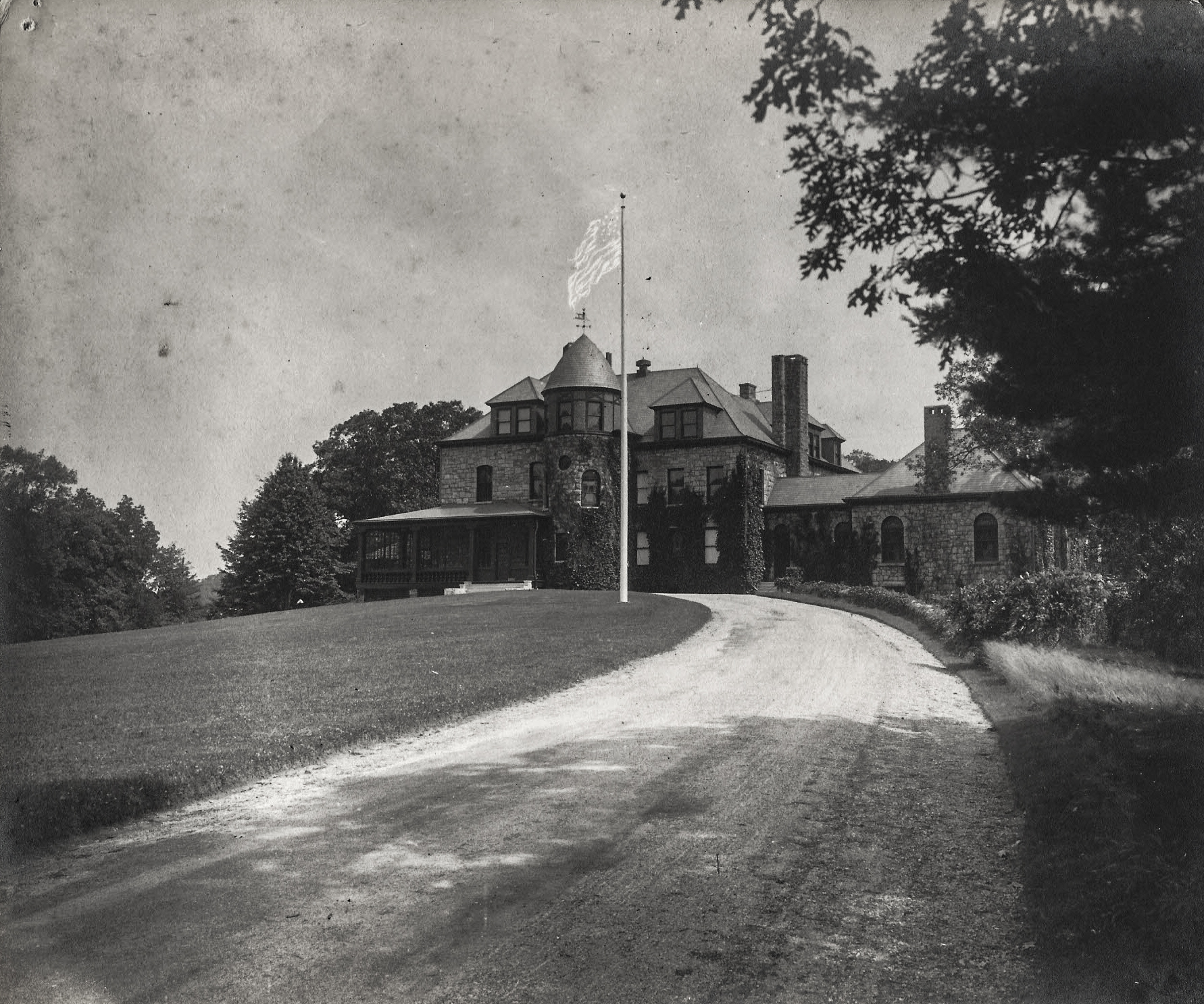
The Manor House as it looked during Law's residence there

Law also developed the village, establishing schools, churches, and parks. He donated land for the Briarcliff Congregational Church (built in 1896) and for Liberty Park (later dedicated as the Walter W. Law Memorial Park); in 1900, he established the School of Practical Agriculture on Pleasantville Road on 66 acres (27 ha) of land. He also built Dysart House as a guest house in 1897, named after Dysart House in Scotland. By 1902, Law had invested $2.5 million ($93 million in 2025) in the village. In 1906, he replaced Briarcliff Manor's railroad station with the present-day public library. His employees at Briarcliff Farms moved into the village in its early years, and Law held some of their mortgages. At the time, New York State required a population density of at least 300 per square mile for incorporation as a village. A proposition was presented to the supervisors of Mount Pleasant and Ossining on October 8, 1902; it requested that the area, which had 640 acres with a population of 381, be incorporated as the Village of Briarcliff Manor. The village was incorporated on November 21, 1902. At the time, Law owned all but two small parcels of the village, and he employed 100 of its residents. Law largely developed his Briarcliff Manor property as a business corporation until 1907, when he purchased 3,249 acres (1,315 ha) for Briarcliff Farms in Pine Plains, New York; he then began developing his properties for houses, churches, and schools instead. In 1909, Law formed the Briarcliff Lodge Association to run the hotel, and the Briarcliff Realty Company to sell the original Briarcliff Farms property. His son, Henry, presided over the realty company until 1936. In 1908, during the Briarcliff Manor-sponsored First American International Road Race, Law donated and presented the Briarcliff Trophy, valued at over $10,000 ($358,300 in 2025). In 1918, Walter Law sold his Briarcliff Farms land in Pine Plains.

== Later life and death ==
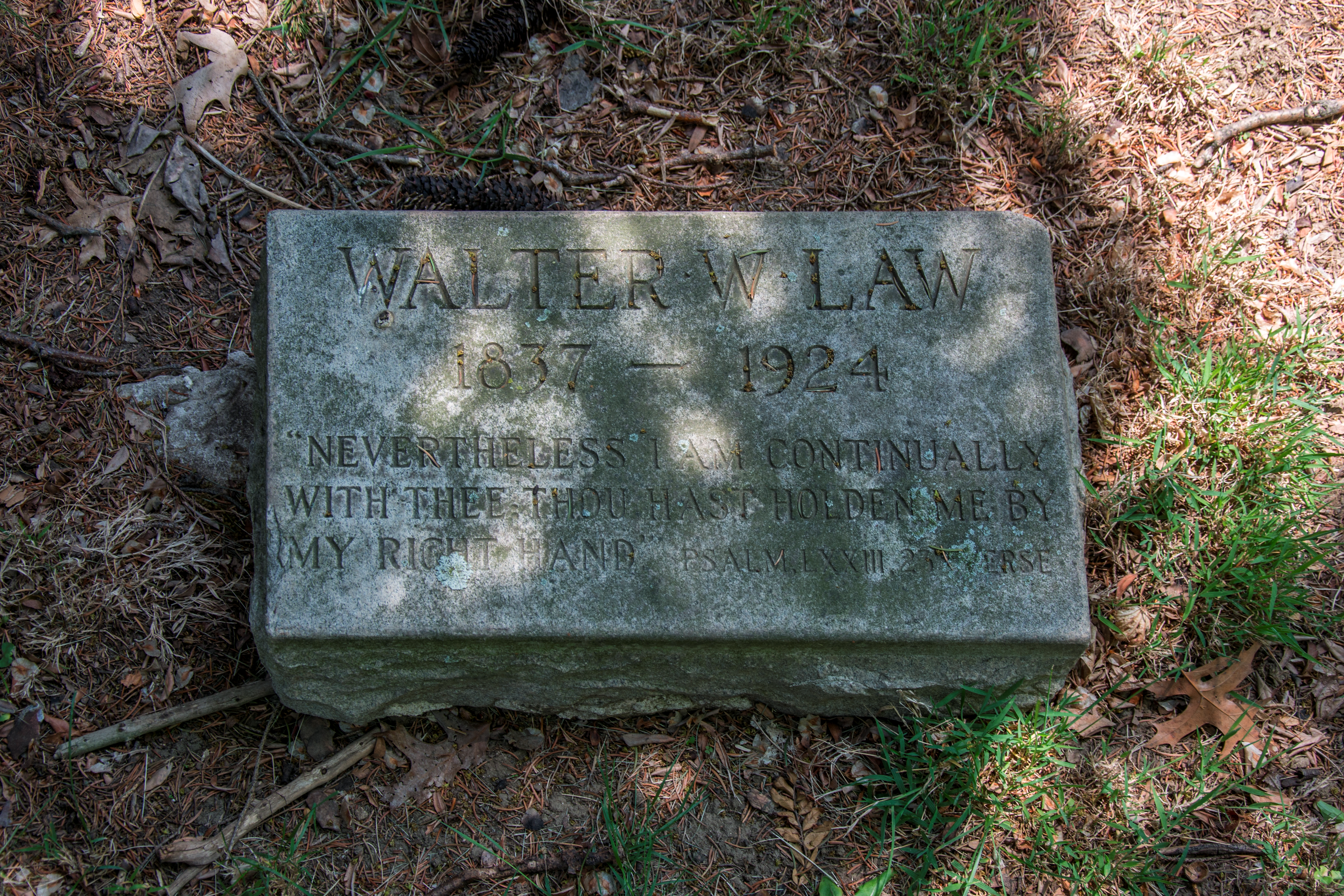
Walter Law's gravestone and family plot

Walter Law died in Summerville, South Carolina, on January 17, 1924. He had gone alone to Summerville for rest cure treatment. After the news of his death spread, Law's son, Henry, left for Summerville. Law's funeral was held at the Briarcliff Congregational Church three days later. He was buried with his wife and two of his children in Woodlawn Cemetery in New York City.

On February 1, 1924, Law's will was filed with county surrogate George A. Slater in White Plains. His estate was approximately $5 million, the majority of which was divided equally between his children. They also each received 25 shares of the Alexander Smith and Sons Carpet company's stock and scrip and 250 shares of the Nairn Linoleum Company. Law's friends, servants, and employees received from $500 to $5,000. He also bequeathed $13,500 to his longtime nurse and secretary Ida Z. Thompson. Law's son Henry inherited the family's Briarcliff Manor house, and Law's daughter Georgia inherited the family's summer house, formerly the C.H. Burnham house, in Jefferson, New Hampshire.

== Family and personal life ==
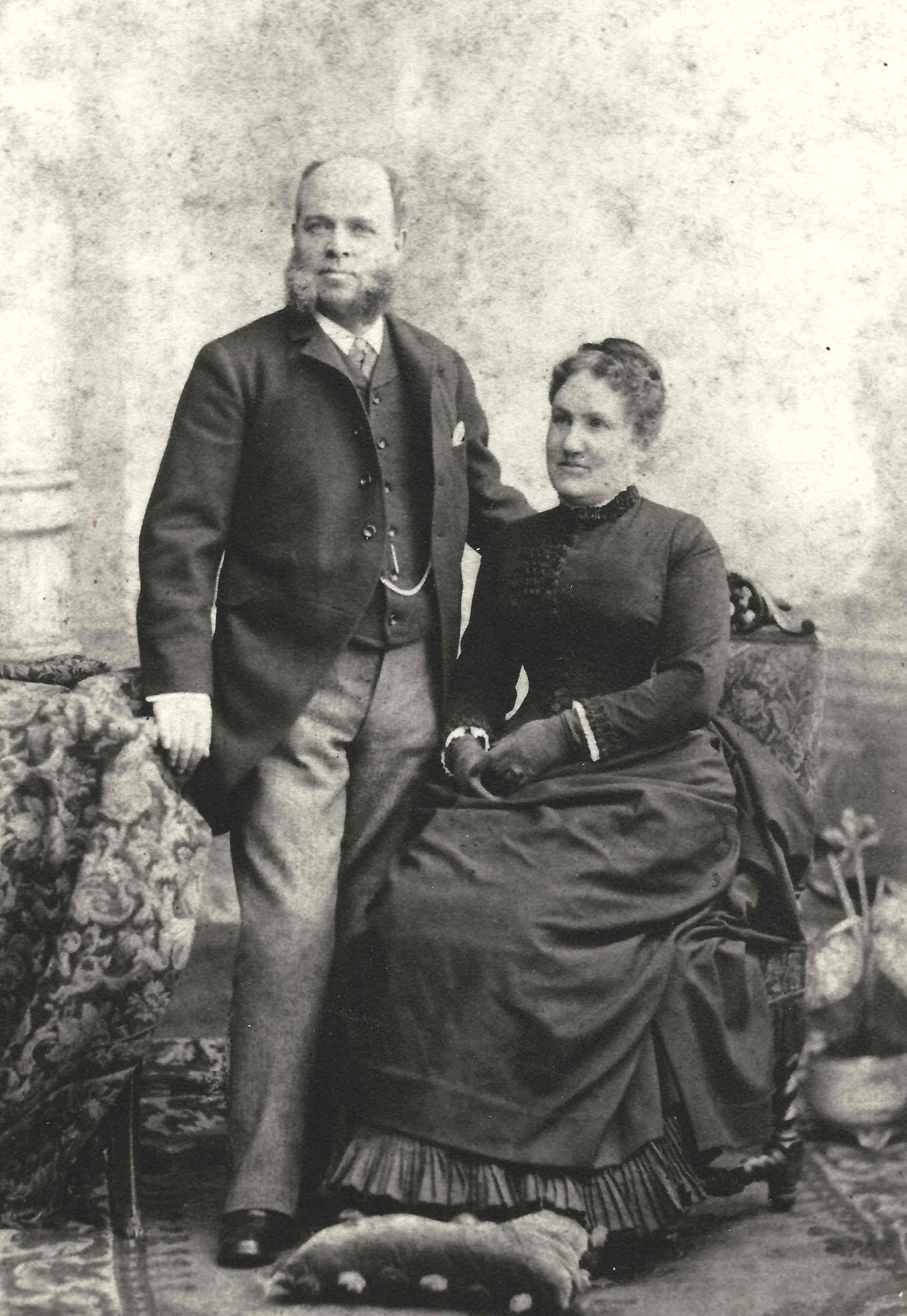
Walter Law with his wife c. 1885

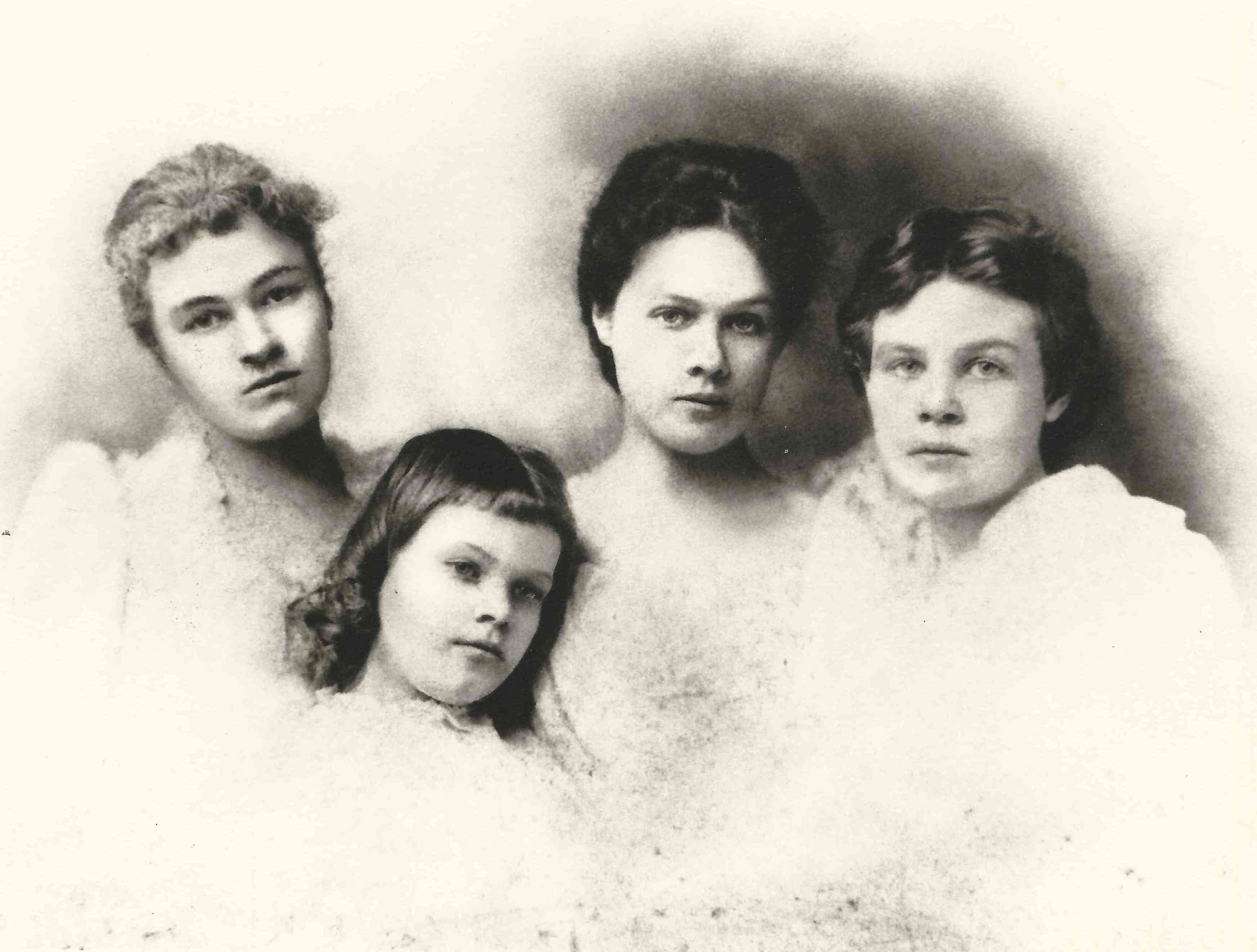
Daughters (left to right): Georgie, Martha, Carolyn, and Edith

Law had three sons and four daughters with his wife, Georgianna Hitt (née Ransom) Law, whom he married on January 4, 1866, at 152 Second Avenue in New York City. She lived from 1839 to September 18, 1910. Their children were Georgia "Georgie" R. Penman (born November 10, 1866), Carrie Law-Fotterall (b. September 10, 1869), Walter W. Law Jr. (b. July 15, 1871), Edith Bird Brockelman (b. April 10, 1874), Arthur Law (January 11, 1876 – January 23, 1877), Henry Herbert Law (February 28, 1878 – November 18, 1936), and Martha Janet Macey (b. March 10, 1880).

During their life at Briarcliff Manor, Law owned the Manor House on Scarborough Road. Law later built houses for Henry, Walter Jr., and Edith on the Briarcliff Lodge property on Scarborough Road. The three houses were named Hillcrest, Six Gables, and Mt. Vernon, and all three still stand.

From Carmino Ravosa's Briarcliff show:
The Laird of Briarcliff Manor

Only the Best is Good Enough

This Is His Town This is His Village

Walter Law was a friend of Andrew Carnegie, who described Law as always having an interest in reading and writing. When he found a phrase to be clever or intriguing, Law would document it for further use. Carnegie wrote that Law often made new friends, and had an attractive personality. Law's personal interest was largely in his personal library of 7,000 volumes, which he collected for more than forty years. His library was said to contain many works of classic literature and history; on a vacation to Europe, Law mostly spent time in Greece visiting historic sites. He was also a member of the Alpine Club, Aldine Association, the American Fine Arts Society, Ardsley Casino (now Ardsley Country Club), the Astronomical Society of the Pacific, New York's Century Association, the Metropolitan Museum of Art, the Players, and Sleepy Hollow Country Club. Law and his wife were on the Aqueduct Guard Citizens' Committee, a committee tasked with providing for the needs of the New York Guard troops who were protecting the Old Croton Aqueduct during World War I. In 1892, Law also received an honorary Master of Arts degree in agriculture from Yale University.

== See also ==
- History of Briarcliff Manor
