= Briarcliff Farms =

Former farm in New York

Coordinates: 41.148°N 73.845°W

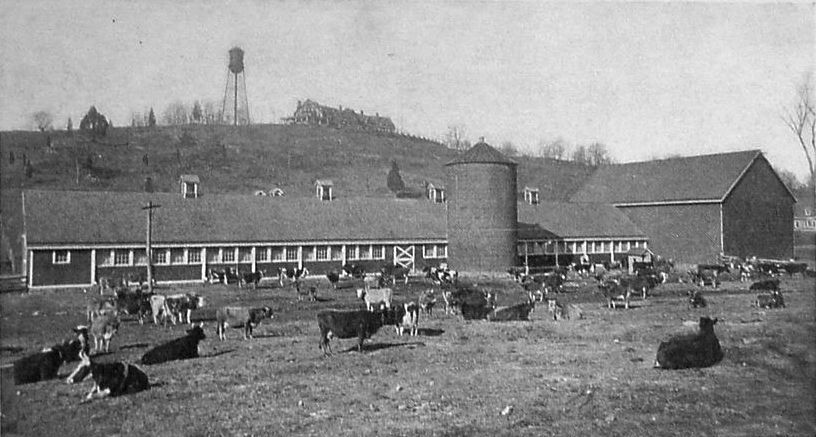
Barn C on Dalmeny Road in front of the Briarcliff Lodge, one of four cattle barns on the farm

Briarcliff Farms was a farm established in 1890 by Walter William Law in Briarcliff Manor, a village in Westchester County, New York. One of several enterprises established by Law at the turn of the 20th century, the farm was known for its milk, butter, and cream and also produced other dairy products, American Beauty roses, bottled water, and print media. At its height, the farm was one of the largest dairy operations in the Northeastern United States, operating about 8,000 acres (10 sq mi) with over 1,000 Jersey cattle. In 1907, the farm moved to Pine Plains in New York's Dutchess County, and it was purchased by New York banker Oakleigh Thorne in 1918, who developed it into an Aberdeen Angus cattle farm. After Thorne's death in 1948, the farm changed hands several times; in 1968 it became Stockbriar Farm, a beef feeding operation. Stockbriar sold the farmland to its current owners in 1979.

The farm combined a practical American business model with the concept of a European country seat or manor, with cows being milked constantly, and with milk promptly chilled and bottled within five minutes, and shipped to stores in New York City each night. The farm was progressive, with sterile conditions, numerous employee benefits, good living conditions for livestock, and regular veterinary inspections to maintain a healthy herd. The farm also made use of tenant farming, established working blacksmith, wheelwright, and harness shops on-site, was located around Walter Law's manor house, and constructed numerous buildings in the Tudor Revival architectural style.

Briarcliff Farms was the original location for the School of Practical Agriculture and Horticulture, established by the New York State Committee for the Promotion of Agriculture in conjunction with Walter Law. The school's purpose was to teach students in farming, gardening, poultry-keeping, and other agriculture-related skills. The school moved to a farm near Poughkeepsie in 1903, and the school building was run as a hotel for two years until it became Miss Knox's School. After the building burned down in 1912, Miss Knox's School was relocated several times; since 1954, the Knox School has been located in St. James, New York.

== History ==
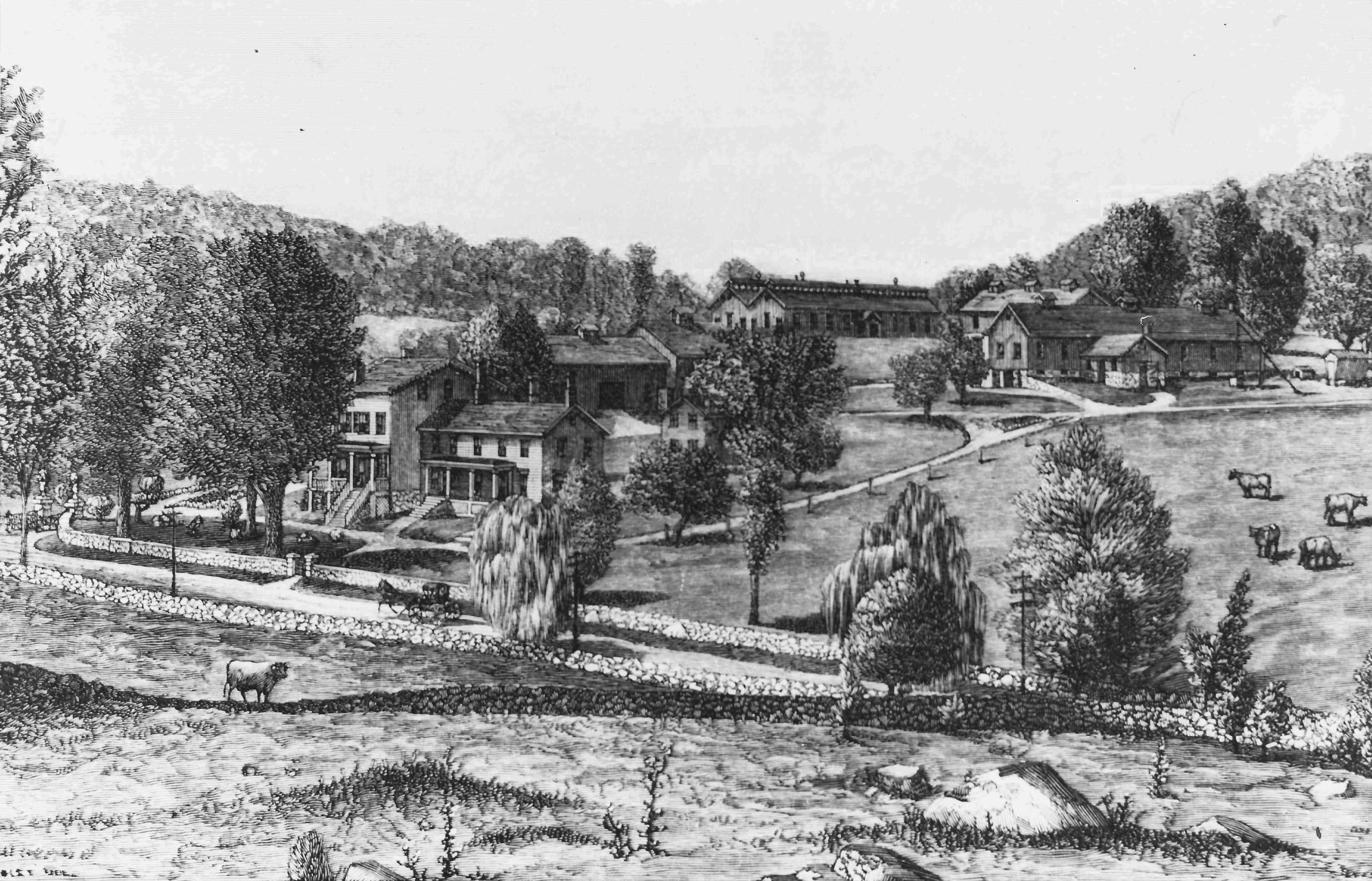
Illustration of James Stillman's Briarcliff Farm around 1886

James Stillman owned a small farm on Pleasantville Road since at least 1886. It was known as Briarcliff Farm after John David Ogilby's estate, Brier Cliff (itself named after Ogilby's family home in Ireland). In 1887 Stillman had a display at the Great Dairy and Cattle Show in New York City's Madison Square Garden, where he demonstrated setting milk, churning cream and making butter. In 1890, Walter Law began purchasing property in the present-day village of Briarcliff Manor as part of his desire for rest and recreation. That year, Law paid James Stillman $35,000 ($1,254,200 in 2025) for his 236-acre (96 ha) farm and renamed it Briarcliff Farms. In 1893, The New York Times reported that the 14th Duke of Veragua (a livestock farmer) and a large party visited the farm on the afternoon of June 16; at that time, the farm had about 330 cattle and 100 sheep. The party went from New York to Scarborough, proceeding by carriage to Briarcliff, and visited the farm's poultry yard, hennery and stables. After observing the farm's heifers and stallions, they went to the creamery to taste Briarcliff butter. The guests went to Law's Yonkers home, Hillcrest, for dinner before returning to New York. After the visit, the duke had said "Well, this is a perfect place. I am delighted with what I have seen."

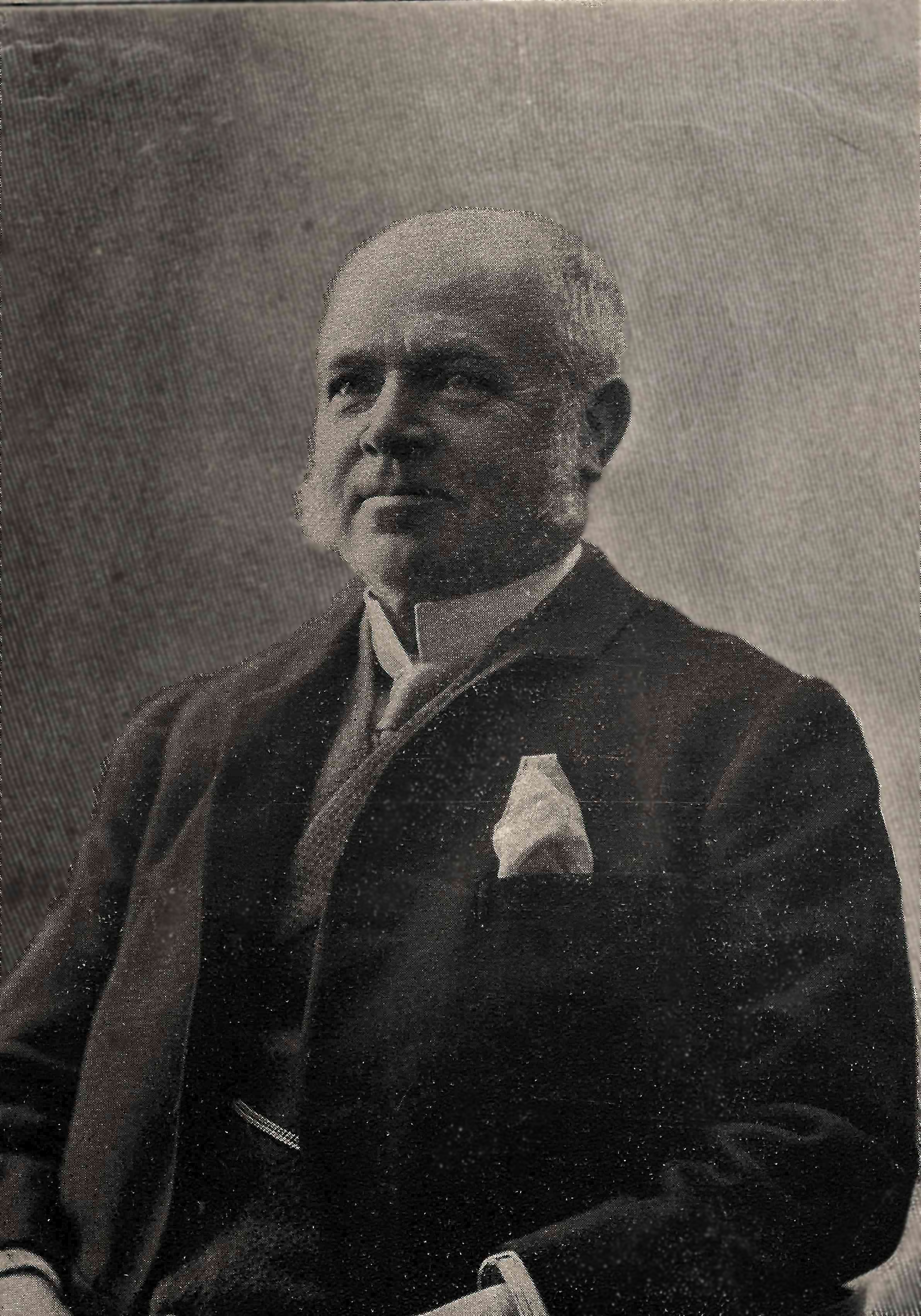
Walter Law, founder of Briarcliff Farms and Manor

In 1898 Law retired from the vice-presidency of W. & J. Sloane, moved with his family to the area and began devoting his time to agriculture. He rapidly added to his holdings, buying about forty parcels in less than ten years; by 1900, Law owned more than 5,000 acres (8 sq mi) of Westchester County and was its largest individual landholder. Some previous owners became tenant farmers; Law received half of the hay and straw from a 160-acre (60 ha) farm formerly owned by Jesse Bishop, and one-third of everything else. Law and Briarcliff Farms initially deepened the Pocantico River for 2 miles (3 km), taking out rifts so the stream would flow and adjacent swamps would drain. Workers also cut rock and took out trees lining the swamps to reclaim land for farming.

Law found the soil poor, since it had been farmed for a half-century. The fields were bare, and cows gave poor-quality milk: "I had to begin at the bottom and repair the waste of fifty years." He improved the soil's fertility by arranging for manure from New York City streets and stables to be regularly brought to his farm; for four years, twenty carloads of manure a week were spread on the land. As a result, the farm's hay yield increased from two to five tons. Law also decided to improve the area's roads, giving them a base layer of large, closely packed stones and layers of top gravel. He developed his herd; at first the farm had weak cattle (many afflicted with tuberculosis) and "ordinary milk", but after Law's development the farm had strong cattle, healthy calves and an abundance of rich milk. Law hired Leonard Pearson (a professor of veterinary medicine at the University of Pennsylvania) to check each cow every six months for tuberculosis and other diseases, exceeding New York City Board of Health standards.

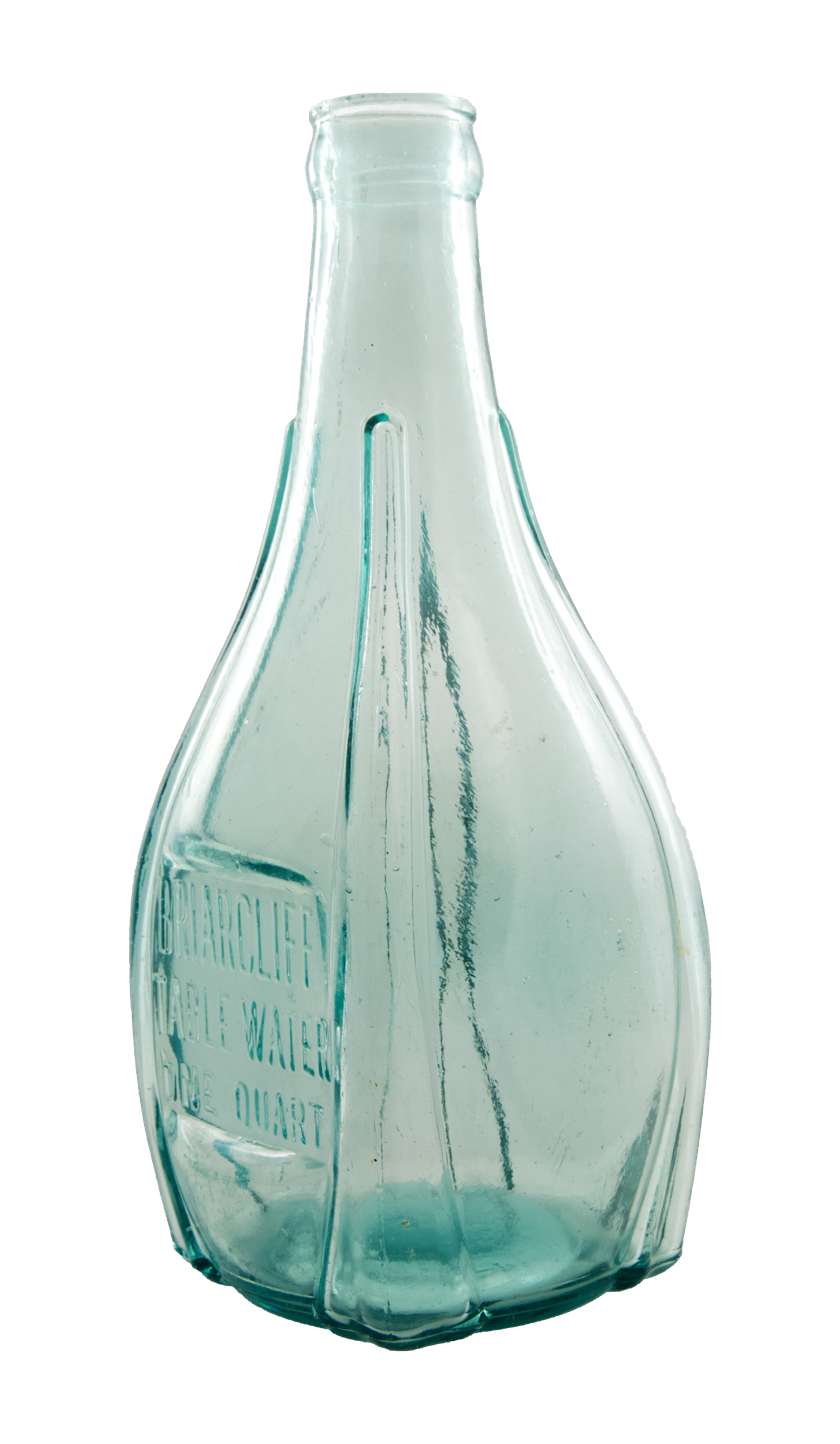
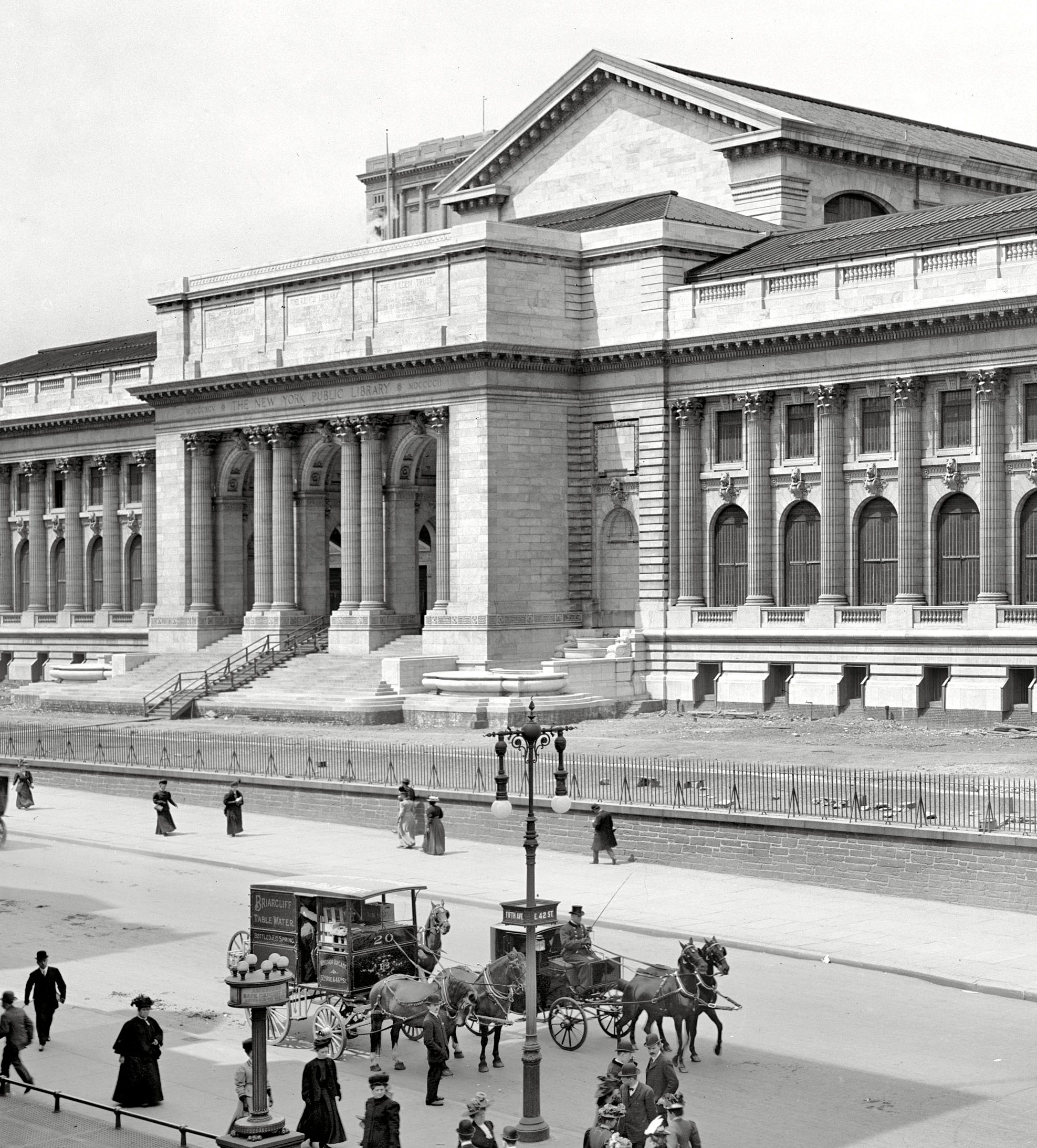
Briarcliff Table Water bottle (left) and a company wagon in front of the New York Public Library Main Branch, 1908 (right)

Although Law had little knowledge or experience of farming at first, he had enough money to reach his goal of maximizing his dairy farm's quality and output. Law's farm had 500 workers tending cattle, pigs, chickens, Thoroughbred horses, pheasants, peacocks and sheep at its peak. In 1900, when the US government asked Briarcliff Farms to exhibit its milk, butter and cream at Paris' Exposition Universelle, the farm submitted raw, pasteurized, and sterilized milk; however, according to the French, "There is no use sending these, for your fresh milk keeps fresh". The farm contributed to the USDA Bureau of Animal Industry and the New York State Commission to the Paris Exhibition's joint exhibit, winning gold medals for its milk, cream, and butter and a silver medal for social benefit or economy. Concerned that the farm's milk had preservatives, French authorities requested an affidavit that no chemicals were added. Photographs by the US government of Briarcliff Farms' barns, farmland, Law's mottoes and employees were displayed in the exposition's Palace of Social Economy and Congress.

On September 2, 1901, the farm's dairy buildings were destroyed by fire. The cause of the fire (which was discovered in the dairy building's tower) was unknown, and the damage was covered by insurance. Law quickly arranged for a temporary dairy in a room of the electric plant which had a boiler for sterilization; by the afternoon, milk was processed as usual. A larger dairy building was planned closer to the railroad station for faster shipping.

When Briarcliff Manor was incorporated on November 21, 1902, Law owned all but two small parcels of the square-mile village and employed nearly all of its residents (around 100). He developed the village, establishing schools, churches, parks and the Briarcliff Lodge. The population grew, encouraging Law to incorporate the area as a village. A proposition was presented to the supervisors of Mount Pleasant and Ossining on October 8, 1902, that a 640-acre (260 ha) area with a population of 331 be incorporated as the Village of Briarcliff Manor, and it was incorporated on November 21. That year Law's son, Walter Jr., joined his father and brother Henry in managing the farm and realty company; he was the second village president, in office from 1905 to 1918. (Note: The title changed to President-Mayor during Henry Law's office (1918-36) and subsequently to Mayor around 1936.)

In April 1906, Governor General of Canada Albert Grey and US Representative and farm architect Edward Burnett drove up from New York City and toured the farm as guests of Walter Law. According to Briarcliff Outlook, they "expressed hearty approval of Briarcliff ways".

=== Relocation to Pine Plains ===
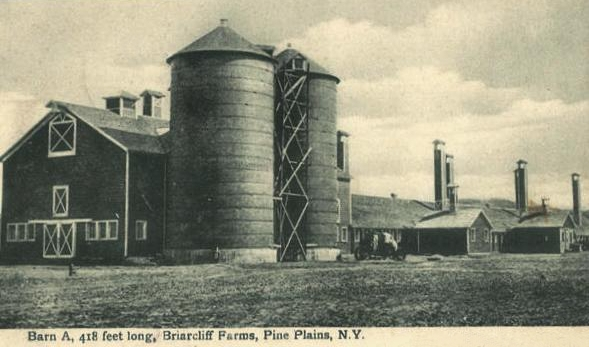
Barn A in Pine Plains around 1910

Law developed his Briarcliff Manor property primarily as a corporation until 1907 when, due to rising property values and falling agricultural development in Westchester County, he purchased twelve farms—totaling 3,249 acres (5 sq mi)—for Briarcliff Farms on both sides of the Pine Plains-Stanford Road (present-day New York State Route 82) in Pine Plains and began developing his Briarcliff Manor properties for houses, churches and schools. Law's general manager, George W. Tuttle (who had worked at Briarcliff Farms since 1901), arranged the Pine Plains purchases and the construction of new barns, a creamery, a power station and other buildings. The barns used Franklin Hiram King's King ventilation system, and the concrete dairy building cost about $25,000 ($895,800 in 2025). The farm's well, 700 feet (210 m) from the barn, was 26 feet (7.9 m) deep and 15 feet (4.6 m) in diameter.

In 1907 and 1908, the farm and many of its workers moved to Pine Plains. Although preliminary steps in the relocation were primarily small, the final October 1908 transfer used two trains to move 300 cattle. The rest of the cattle were transferred a day later, to the farm's main station (between Pine Plains and Attlebury on the Central New England Railway) at Barn A. During Briarcliff Manor's first automobile race in 1908, the barns were used for mechanic crews and each driver had his own crew weeks before the race. In 1909 Law formed the Briarcliff Realty Company to sell the original Briarcliff Manor property. He sold the Pine Plains property in 1918 and died in 1924.

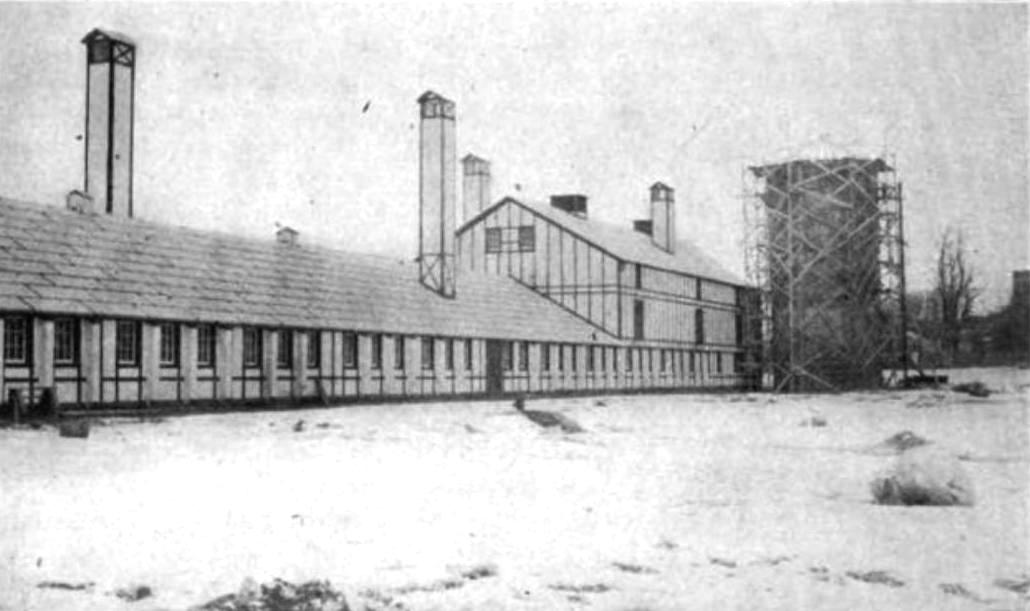
Barn B in Pine Plains around 1910

On October 9, 1918, New York banker Oakleigh Thorne and several partners purchased the 4,200-acre (7 sq mi) Briarcliff Farms property, cattle and dairy buildings for $500,000 ($10.7 million in 2025). Thorne began breeding Aberdeen Angus cattle under the Briarcliff Farms name, and the farm remained well known for its beef. Thorne and W. Alan McGregor began the herd by importing cattle from Scotland in 1925, and enlarged it through breeding. The Aberdeen Angus industry became prominent in the United States due to Briarcliff Farms; in 1955, about 95 percent of US Angus cattle were from Briarcliff stock.

Thorne hired William Harper Pew for Pew's knowledge of livestock bloodlines. At the time, the farm had over 5,000 acres (8 sq mi) and 1,000 purebred Aberdeen Angus cattle (the largest Aberdeen Angus herd in the country). Pew began eighteen Angus herds in Dutchess County, and was a director of the American Angus Association. At the International Livestock Show in 1927, the farm had the International Grand Champion Female, and in 1930 it had the 1930 International Grand Champion Bull. Because of the 1931 and 1933 expositions, Thorne became first to win a grand champion twice, with two of his livestock awarded International Grand Champion Steers. At the 1934 Dutchess County Fair's beef-cattle show, 100 cattle and steers were exhibited. Briarcliff Aristocrat, a summer yearling weighing 1,000 pounds (450 kg), was named the grand champion steer. The grand champion bull was the farm's Briarcliff Barbarian 8th, the first-prize senior yearling of the 1933 International Livestock Show. The grand champion female was Briarcliff Mighonne 10th, the first-prize senior yearling heifer of the 1933 international show.

The farm affected a number of herds, and the Briarcliff prefix is still seen in many pedigrees. In 1935 the 2,000-acre (3 sq mi) portion of the farm east of the road was sold to Henry Jackson, who named it Bethel Farms. After Thorne's death in 1948, Briarcliff Farms changed hands a number of times. In 1968 it became Stockbriar Farm, a beef-feeding operation. Stockbriar tried to sell the farm several times, and it nearly became a county zoo. In 1979, Stockbriar sold the farmland to the Conservation and Preservation Association (CAPA) for $2.1 million ($9.32 million in 2025).

In 1982 CAPA hired a Millbrook realtor, who advertised the farm for $2.75 million ($9.17 million in 2025) in The New York Times, The Wall Street Journal and newspapers published by Taconic Press. Around that time Stockbriar Farms filed four lawsuits against CAPA and its lessee (Mashomack Fish and Game Preserve) over the Pine Plains farm, claiming that the preserve operated a private club without a liquor permit and CAPA missed a March 23, 1982 payment which was the bulk of its total payment for the farm. Stockbriar Farms requested that Mashomack be evicted, and its property returned. One lawsuit was filed in county court, and the other three were filed in New York Supreme Court. Although Mashomack and CAPA won the first two, in 1984 a state supreme court justice ordered Mashomack and CAPA to vacate the property and Stockbriar Farms remained for sale.

== Locations ==
=== Briarcliff Manor ===
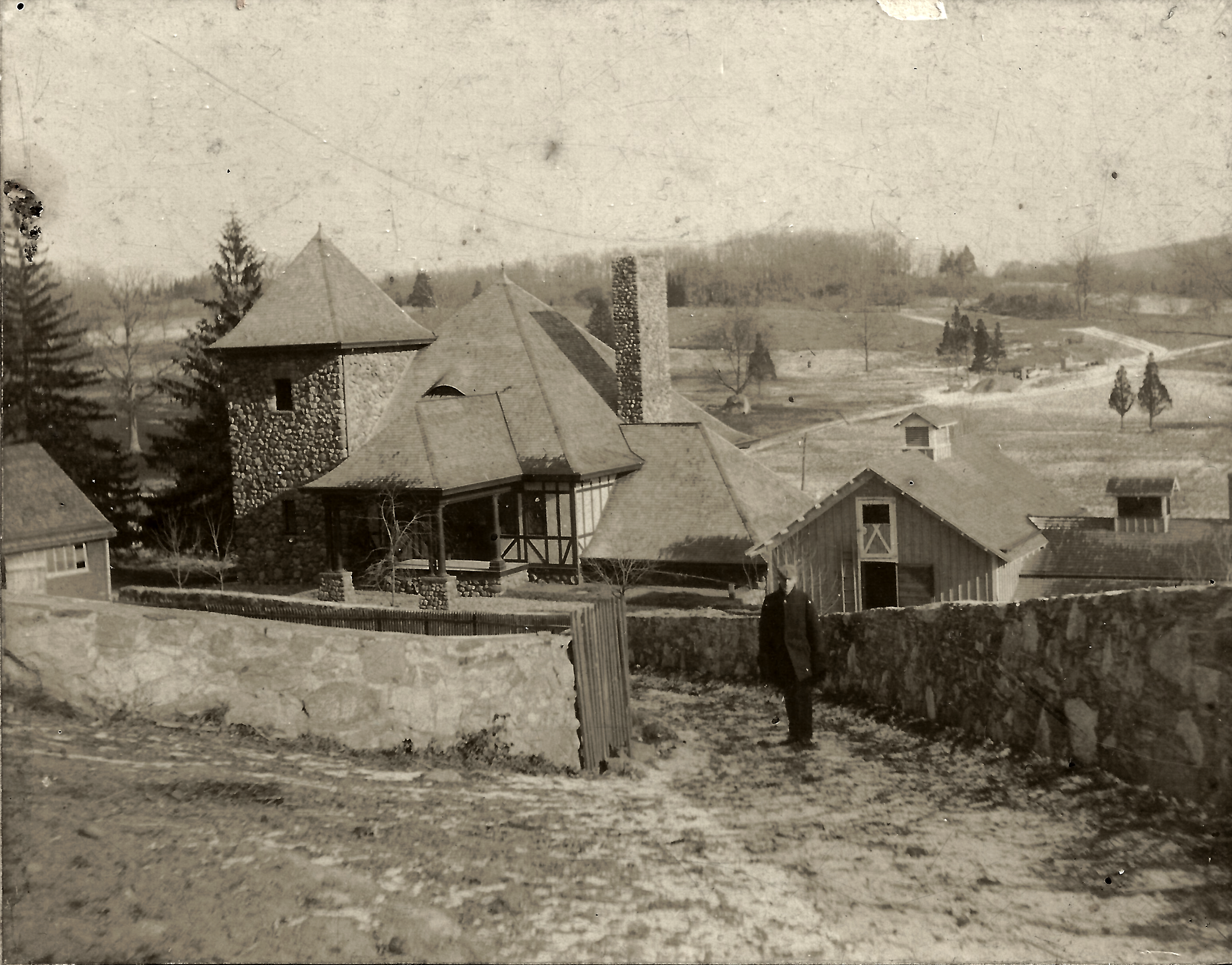
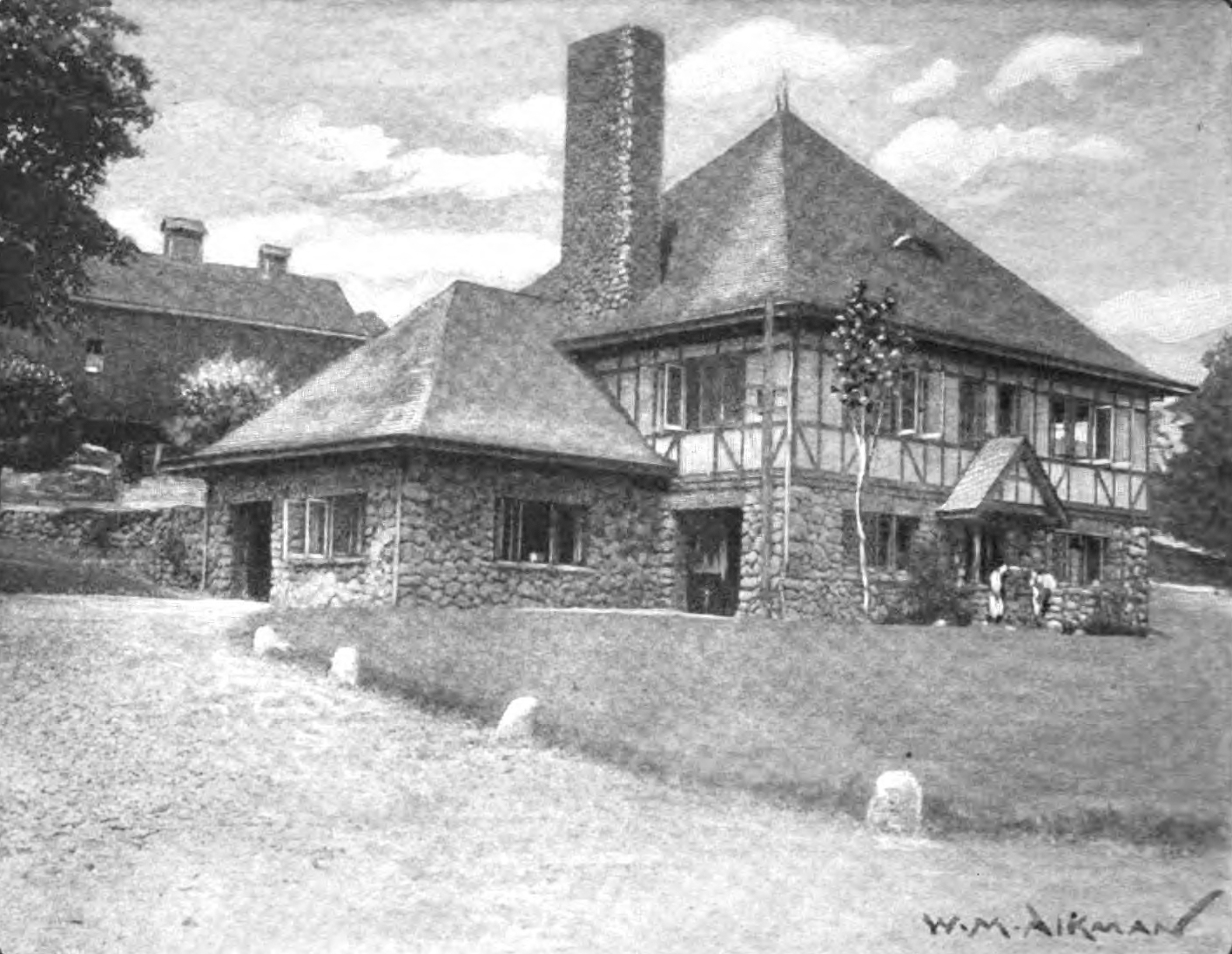
1360 Pleasantville Road, Briarcliff Farms' dairy and office, around 1900

The farm, overlooking the Hudson River, was established between the Hudson and Pocantico Rivers in the hamlet of Whitson's Corners (present-day Briarcliff Manor), 27 miles (40 km) from Manhattan. Its location was described in 1901 as "the most healthy, hilly portion of Westchester ...where there are neither swamps nor contaminated streams of water". The original land plot, four miles (6,400 m) long and three miles (4,800 m) wide, was developed within twelve years. In 1901, Briarcliff Farms (including its school farm) encompassed 6,000 acres (9 sq mi) between Pleasantville and Old Briarcliff Roads north of Scarborough Road. At its peak, its original location covered 7,800 acres (10 sq mi). In Briarcliff Manor, the farm had six main barns: Barn A, near its office building on Pleasantville Road, housed the horses for the farm and the Briarcliff Lodge. The farm's blacksmith, wheelwright, harness shops and other buildings were located around that barn, and a smokehouse and butcher's shop were on-site. Barns B (housing 78 cattle) and C (housing 118 cattle) were at the south end of Dalmeny Road; Barn D (housing 116 cattle), between Beech Hill Road and New York State Route 117, was later used as a boarding stable for horses. Barn E (housing 118 cattle) was on Pleasantville Road just east of the present Taconic State Parkway, and Barn F (housing 118 cattle) was in Millwood near the intersection of the Taconic and New York State Route 100. The farm also had a large barn near New York State Route 9A for supplies, including feed for the farm. Each barn had an ice shed to cool milk; ice was harvested primarily from Echo Lake (source of the Pocantico River), with Kinderogen Lake (now part of the Edith Macy Conference Center) as a supplemental source. The farm had a large supply store, with feed and other items, southeast of the service station at North State and Pleasantville Roads.

The Briarcliff Farms office, Walter Law's personal office, was also the first dairy building; it burned down in 1901, and was rebuilt the following year. From Briarcliff Manor's 1902 incorporation to the construction of its first municipal building in 1913, the office housed the village government. During the 1960s the building was redesigned, rebuilt and became a local union headquarters for the International Union of Operating Engineers. The farm was enclosed, and its pastures were divided by stone walls from within the farm; the stones were also used for roadbeds, and for walls of the farm buildings, office, and Law's house.

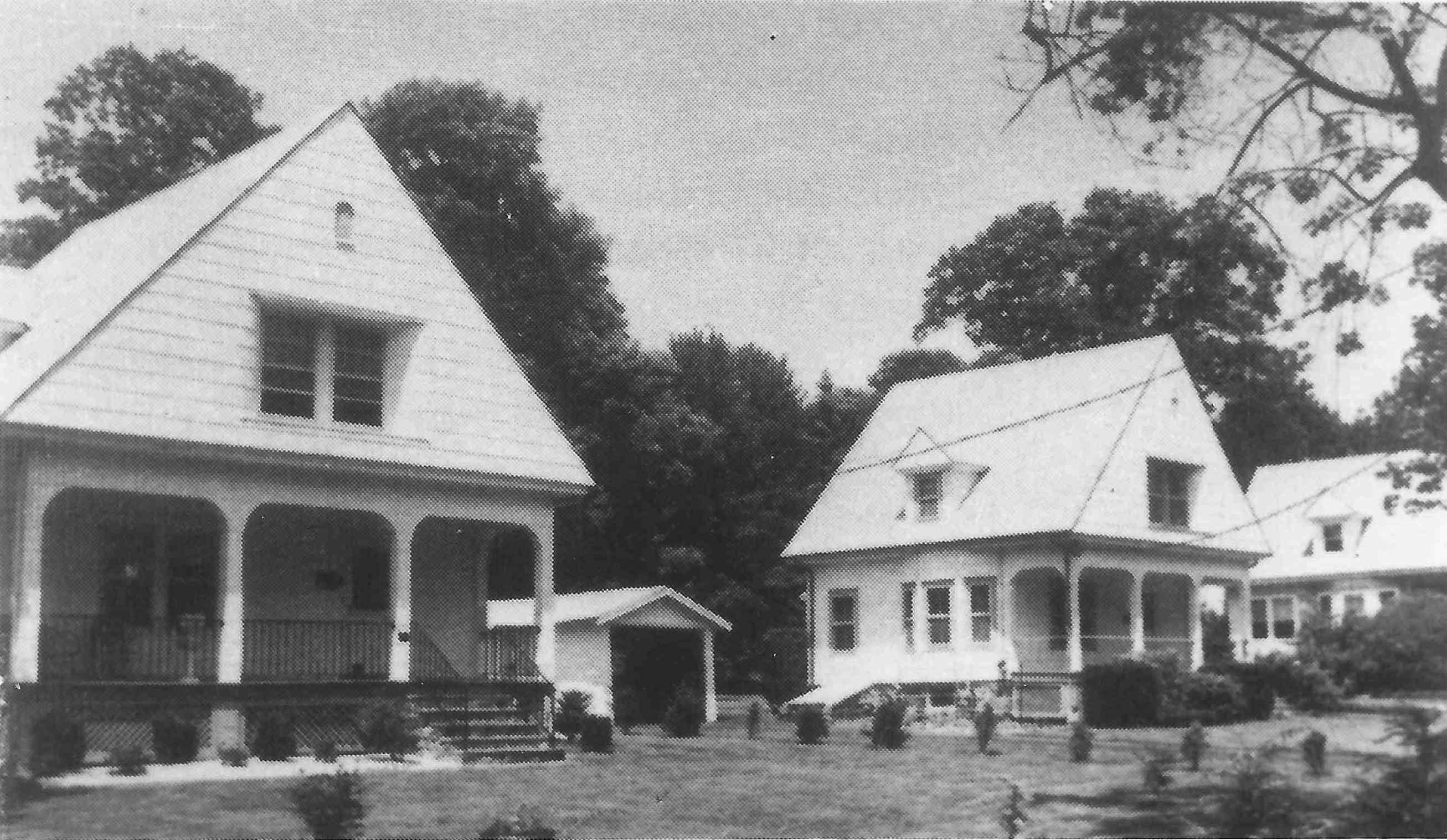
Cottages on Dalmeny Road

Walter Law encouraged his Briarcliff Farms employees to move into the village, selling 2,500-square-foot (230 m^{2}) or 11,250-square-foot (1,045 m^{2}) plots of land to workers for a nominal price. He asked workers to choose the type of house they wanted; he would have it built and hold the mortgage, or allow them to rent a cottage. Law built several wood-framed cottages near the farms, with steep front-gable roofs and open porches using some of the first-floor space. Of the cottages still standing, six are on Dalmeny Road and three are on Old Briarcliff Road. The farm also owned and operated a farm in Peekskill previously owned by John Paulding, a militiaman who helped capture British major John André, running the Peekskill farm as a nursery for maples, oaks, lindens, hemlocks, spruces and other trees. During the early 1900s Law purchased farms in Lewisboro and Pound Ridge, using those farms to replenish the main farm's cattle herd. He also purchased a house in Pound Ridge, which his Briarcliff Realty Company sold to Westchester County after his death; it became the headquarters of the Ward Pound Ridge Reservation, the county's largest park.

==== Dalmeny ====
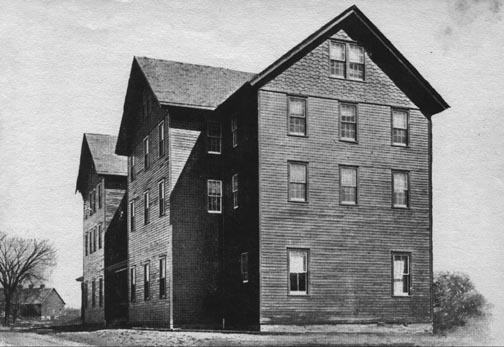
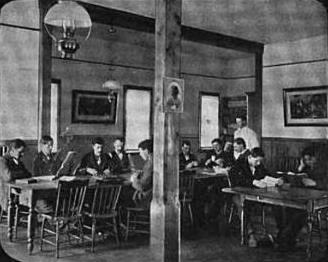
The Dalmeny boarding house and its reading room

Walter Law provided Dalmeny, a boarding house on Dalmeny Road, for the farm's single men. The building, modeled after the Mills Houses in New York City, was 100 feet (30 m) long and four stories tall. Its first floor had a social hall for meetings and entertainment, a parlor and reading room equipped with books, newspapers, magazines, and games, a large dining room, a private dining room, a kitchen and a bathroom with marble basins and clean towels. The upper floors had seventy individual bedrooms for the men, with bathrooms with showers and tubs on every floor. Dalmeny also had a resident barber. Farm workers were not required to live in the boarding house, although the number of people wanting to live there exceeded the space available. Rent was $15–18 per month, including room, board and laundry. Law frequently joined the men at meals, lecturers visited the boarding house and the farm workers had a performing orchestra, brass band and glee club.

Dalmeny opened on Christmas 1899 and closed in July 1908, in conjunction with the farm's relocation to Upstate New York. Over a period of several months in 1909 the building was moved to the Briarcliff Lodge property, where it was adjacent to the Lodge's laundry building. (Note: The Briarcliff Lodge's laundry building was built in 1909, was The King's College's music building, and was demolished in summer 2002.) When the Lodge was the campus of King's College from 1955 to 1994, the school called the former boarding house Harmony Hall and used it for classrooms and staff housing. In autumn 1979, King's College demolished the building shortly after dedicating a new classroom building.

=== Pine Plains ===
Briarcliff Farms' second location, in the town of Pine Plains, initially covered 3,249 acres (5 sq mi). The farm, 2 miles (3 km) from the hamlet of Pine Plains, was adjacent to the Central New England Railway in the shallow Stissing Basin and 12 miles (20 km) from the Hudson River. The Pine Plains farm had three barns, each built at a cost of about $20,000 ($716,700 in 2025) and housing 200 Jersey cattle bedded in sawdust or shavings. Barn B was in the Pine Plains hamlet of Bethel and Barn C was farther south, in the town of Stanford.

== Operations ==
Briarcliff Farms milk
Nutritional value per 100 g (3.5 oz)
- Carbohydrates
- Sugars lactose: 4.83 g
- Fat: 5.36 g
- Protein: 3.76 g
- Other constituents: Quantity
- Water: 85.31 g
- Source: "The Inspiration of a Great Farm", Country Life in America, page 13, 1902.
- ^{†}Percentages estimated using US recommendations for adults.

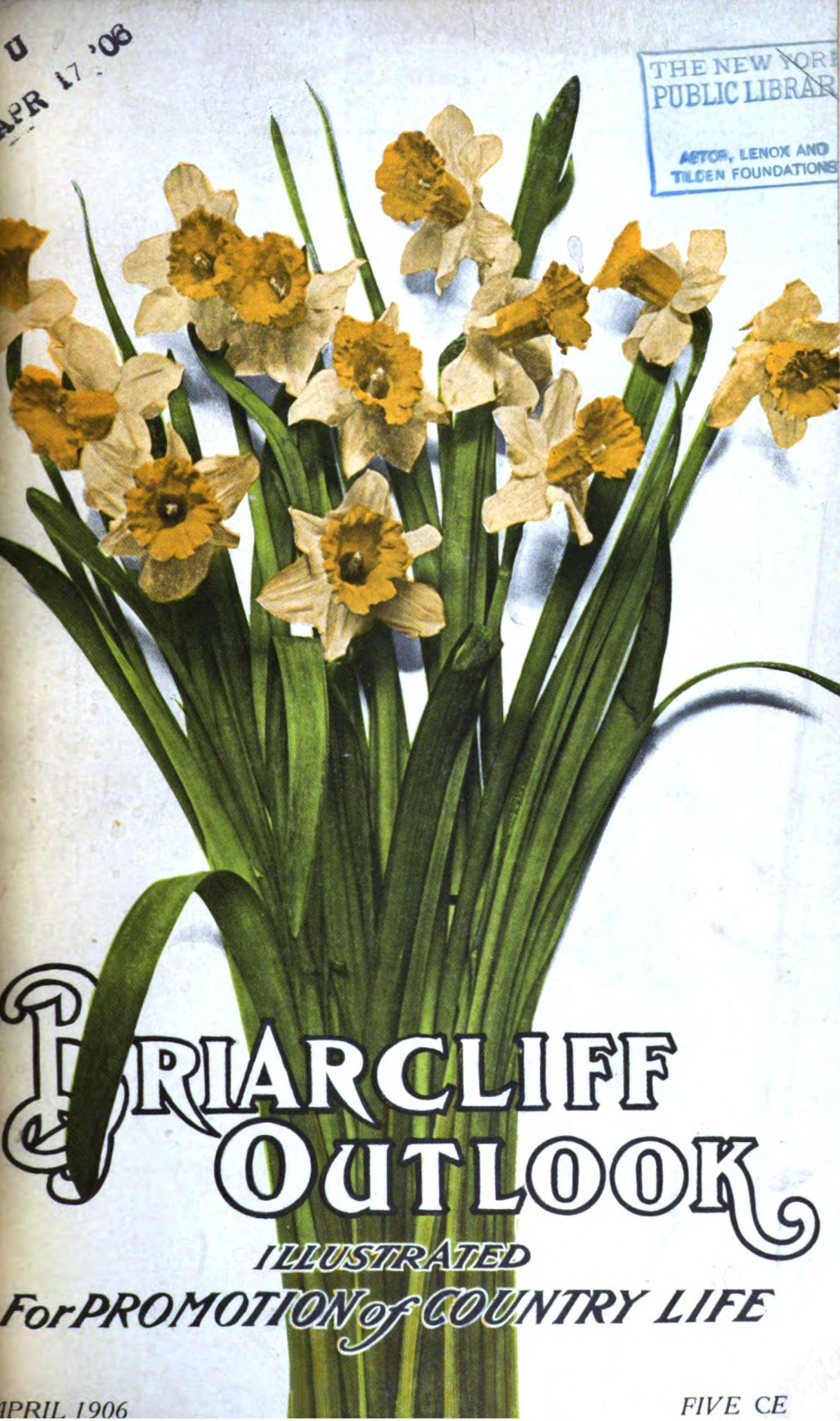
Briarcliff Outlook cover, April 1906

Briarcliff Farms herd population
Year	No.	±% p.a.
1893	330	—
1899	849	+17.06%
1900	1,029	+21.20%
1901	1,045	+1.55%
1902	1,100	+5.26%
1904	2,460	+49.54%
1908	1,200	−16.43%
1915	900	−4.03%
1918	1,000	+3.57%
Sources: * 1893 * 1899 * 1900 * 1901 * 1902; *1904; *1908 * 1915 * 1918

The farm utilized the concept of a European country seat, through tenant farming, established blacksmith, wheelwright, and harness shops on-site, in addition to a butcher shop and smokehouse. Buildings were centrally located around Walter Law's manor house, many of which were constructed in the Tudor Revival style. The farm's office building, Dysart House, the Briarcliff Lodge, and the railroad station shared that architectural style.

The farm, one of the first producers of certified milk in the US, operated under the supervision of the Milk Commission of the Medical Society of the County of New York. With the farm producing about 4,500 US quarts (4,300 litres) of milk daily (an average of 8 US quarts (7.6 litres) per cow per day), Briarcliff Farms was one of the largest dairy operations in the northeast. According to Nebraska's department of agriculture in 1903, the three largest owners of dairy cows in the eastern US were Fairfield Farm Dairy in New Jersey, Briarcliff Farms and the Walker-Gordon Laboratory Company (which had "branches in all of the principal cities"). In 1897 the farm had Jersey, Normande and Simmental cattle, selling the breeds' milk for 10, 12 and 15 cents per quart respectively. Briarcliff Farms also sold cream (with 50 percent butterfat) for 60 cents per quart, Jersey butter for 50 cents per pound and Normande or Simmental butter for 60 cents per pound. In 1909, half the farm's herd consisted of registered Jerseys and the other half high-grade Jerseys. In Pine Plains, many of Barn B's milkers were from the Netherlands because of that country's reputation for good milkers.

In 1905, Briarcliff Farms was milking nearly 500 cows at any given time. The farm raised its own stock, feeding the cattle eight pounds of dry feed twice a day with pasture and green corn in summer. The feed mixture was 50 percent bran, 25 percent crushed oats and 25 percent cornmeal, all of which were claimed to be the best available. The farm required that each cow produce 6,000 pounds of milk with 5 percent butterfat or 5,000 pounds of milk with 6 percent butterfat, or she would be butchered or sold. Each cow ate an average of seven pounds of grain per day (varying from two pounds on pasture to 12 in winter), 1.5 to 2 pounds of oil meal each day and free-choice timothy and clover hay—17–20 pounds (7.7–9.1 kg) daily, depending on size. Each worker milked, cleaned and groomed 16 to 18 cattle daily. The New York Milk Commission analyzed the farm's milk weekly; although the board of health regulations in New York allowed three million bacteria per cubic centimeter in milk, the milk commission limited bacteria to 30,000. The farm chilled its milk within two minutes of milking to 45 °F (7 °C), often limiting its bacteria counts to 200–400 per cc. A chemical analysis of the milk was performed every month; although regulations required a minimum of three percent butterfat, Briarcliff required its milk to have over five percent butterfat to be sold. A March 1905 New York Milk Commission analysis indicated that the farm's milk had 8.2 percent butterfat, the "richest Briarcliff product ever reported on".

In 1901 the farm had 1,045 Jersey cattle, 4,000 chickens and ducks, 1,500 pigs, and 400 sheep. It grew, with 500 workers tending those animals in addition to Thoroughbred horses, pheasants and peacocks. The pigs (which included Chester Whites and Berkshires) lived outdoors, because the farm superintendent believed they should be penned only for breeding; in summer, they were allowed to run in the orchards or the woods. About 2,000 were butchered each year. The farm's 31 poultry houses had a head poulterer and 40 assistants; each building was 18 by 100 feet (5.5 by 30.5 m), and they were spread around the property. The farm, which used 300-egg insulators, fed the hens a mix of grains (including oats, wheat and corn) five times a day. The farm butchered 7,000 broilers each season. Eggs sold for 35 to 50 cents per dozen, with demand exceeding supply. Broilers sold for $1.50 ($58 in 2025) to $3.00 ($116 in 2025) per pair. Briarcliff Farms raised about 300 lambs each spring, primarily Dorset Horns. The lambs, which were dressed (their internal organs removed) on the farm, sold for $12 ($464 in 2025) or more apiece; demand also exceeded supply.

The farm gardens grew a variety of crops, adapting to the market; in 1900 this included oats, rye, corn, wheat, buckwheat, carrots, mangolds, turnips, rutabagas, radishes, sugar beets, potatoes, apples, cabbages, rye, oat, and wheat straw, hay, corn stalks and silage. The farm rotated its grain production to grow better vegetables. At one time the farm had 12 acres (0.02 sq mi) of asparagus, which sold for 35 to 50 cents per bunch.

Briarcliff Farms operated a printing press and office north of the farm office on Pleasantville Road. The print shop produced Briarcliff Farms, the Briarcliff Bulletin in 1900, the monthly Briarcliff Outlook in 1903 and The Briarcliff Once-a-Week in 1908 (all edited by Arthur W. Emerson) and bottle caps for Briarcliff dairy products. The Briarcliff Table Water Company sold its products in New York City, Lakewood, New Jersey and the Westchester municipalities of Yonkers, Tarrytown, White Plains, and Ossining. The company owned 250-foot-deep (76 m) wells. Around 1901, the Briarcliff Steamer Company No. 1 (later the Briarcliff Manor Fire Department) housed its equipment and horses at Briarcliff Farms' Barn A. The American Plasmon Syndicate, a producer of the dried milk product plasmon, had its factory in Briarcliff for milk from Briarcliff Farms; the farm built the factory and its power plant.

In a 1900 publication the farm's motto was reported to be "The production of pure food of the highest standard of excellence", although a 1902 publication reported that its motto was "Do unto a cow as you would that a cow would do unto you" (also saying that the motto appeared in large letters in every barn on the farm). Notices printed by the farm began with the verse, "If a Cobbler by trade, I'll make it my pride, the best of all Cobblers to be; and if only a Tinker, no Tinker on earth shall mend an old Kettle like me"; this verse and several other mottoes decorated friezes on the interior walls of the Dalmeny boarding house.

=== Processing and delivery ===
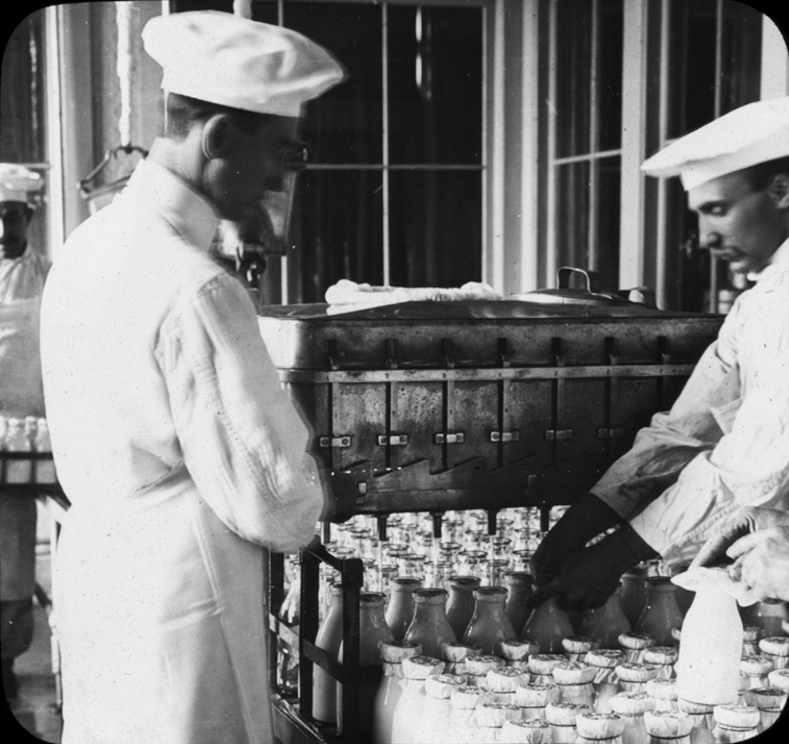
Bottling at Briarcliff Farms, 1906

At its peak, the farm delivered milk to areas from Albany to New York City. After it was cooled, the milk was brought daily to the dairy-processing building, where it was poured into a large, sterilized tank and forced—with compressed air at 160 US quarts (150,000 ml) per minute—through sterilized pipes to the building's second floor. There the milk was cooled, strained five times and bottled. The bottles were sealed with parchment circles with the supervising commission's certification and the date, and then put in boxes with ice. The entire process, from entering the building to bottling, took five minutes. Every utensil contacting the milk (or workers) would be regularly sterilized with live steam. The building was as free of bacteria as the farm could make it; its rooms had white-tiled walls and floors, with coving (concave tiling) between the walls and floors for better cleaning. Milk bottles were reused after several cleanings with rotating wire brushes and two hours of heat sterilization.

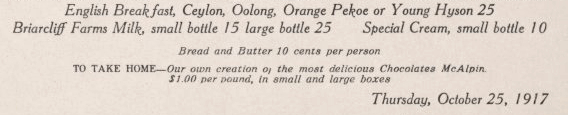
Part of a Hotel McAlpin menu from 1917, with Briarcliff Farms milk offered by the bottle

The farm's products were packaged as milk, cream, butter or kumyss, and sent every night on the New York and Putnam Railroad to New York City for delivery the next day; they were also sold in the farm's stores or from wagons. Briarcliff Farms had three stores in New York City and stores in Greenwich, Connecticut, Yonkers, Dobbs Ferry and Tarrytown. The farm's first New York City store was in Manhattan's Windsor Arcade, at Fifth Avenue and 46th Street, and it had an office in the Seymour Building at Fifth Avenue and 42nd Street. The office produced advertisements for the New-York Tribune, The New York Times, New York Evening Post and the Mail and Express (papers which, according to Printers' Ink, advertised to wealthy residents). The farm's stores sold Briarcliff dairy products and table water. Milk was sent to the Hotel Lorraine, the St. Regis, the Waldorf Astoria, Mendel's Lunch Room at Grand Central Station and Milhau's Drug Store on Broadway, and kumyss was sent to seventeen New York City drugstores. Milk was sold to stores in New York free on board for $0.084 ($2.90 in 2025) per quart. The farm also supplied the Briarcliff Lodge with cream, milk, butter, eggs and vegetables. It shipped its products in zinc-lined cases on ocean-going steamers and shipped nationwide every day except Sunday (shipping a double order on Saturday). The farm's milk was processed into milk, cheese, butter or buttermilk at its Barn A creamery in Pine Plains, and packaged for its 101-mile (200 km) rail shipment to New York City.

=== Ethos and advances ===
That a man ...who has acquired wealth by trade or manufacture should leave the city to develop an ideal farm is something new and notable. This is what Mr. Walter W. Law has done at Briarcliff Manor. He determined to have a farm run absolutely on the highest principles—a farm where science should speak the first word and the last word, and all the time. Science is nothing but accumulated experience; what we have found out to be best and truest; and so Briarcliff Manor farms were simply to do the best, instead of second best, or third best, or tenth best. The houses were to be models, the stables were to be ideal, the orchards planted and worked ideally, the gardens must show what possibly could be done in vegetables, and the corn crop and the oats and the wheat must not be left to any guesses of man or nature. Feeding must be done on scientific principles; barns must be as sanitary as houses; stables must be sunny and thoroughly ventilated. Water must be absolutely pure for the cattle, and their sanitary conditions as perfect as those for human beings.

— The Independent

In 1906, Andrew Carnegie wrote about Briarcliff Farms: "Every known appliance or mode of treatment is at hand, and the herd is pronounced free from all and every ailment. In cases of doubt animals are sacrificed". The farm used the best obtainable stock, with extensive experimenting, for its products. The operation immediately removed every cow that appeared ill, and many cattle were butchered during the farm's first few years to improve the herd's overall health. According to Walter Law, "It is not the cows that have been put in, but those which have been taken out, that have made the Briarcliff herd what it is". The farm's large, light barns had concrete floors, which were cleaned daily, and up-to-date appliances for separating, churning, handling and packing its products.

Law made annual five-dollar cash awards ($194 in 2025) to workers in September (giving them out at Dalmeny on December 24), which included "most gentle with cows", "most careful teamster in feeding his horses and keeping his stables clean", "cleanest delivery wagon", "neatest house yard", "best garden truck" and "best-kept room in Dalmeny"; the farm emphasized the commercial value of such virtues. On Christmas Eve, after the Briarcliff Orchestra played George Frideric Handel's "Largo", Law spoke about the farm's improvements that year and awarded the prizes. The orchestra was made up of the farm's workers, and among its members was Law's son Walter Jr.

The arrangement for human beings must be on the highest level. Men and boys who were employed must be looked after to produce a splendid human result. That is, they must not be left to act as so many mechanical appliances or brute force masters of the lower animals ... It seems not yet quite familiar to us that a store should have the Golden Rule for a business maxim; but what are we to make of a farm where the superintendent says, "Not until we apply the Golden Rule to cows will we ever get the best from them?" The walls of the stables are hung with such mottoes as "Speak gently; it is better far to rule by love than by fear." The application of this rule to cows ought to create a moral evolution in the stablemen, so that by and by it could be applied to human folk as well, and thoroughly believed in as a workable law of life.

— The Independent

Briarcliff Farms intended to prove that optimal farming practices could be profitable. Law believed that kind treatment would produce better cattle, and was intolerant of animal abuse: "Cruelty to a cow is the same as cruelty to me, and shall never be permitted on this farm." He knew everyone who lived at the farms, and the farm workers knew the name of each cow (which was on a brass plate at the front of the cow's stall). The cows were sponged several times a day, and workers wore white cotton suits which were sterilized daily by boiling. Law treated his workers as intelligent co-workers, rather than laborers. Each cow was groomed before milking, and a pail of warm water and a brush would then be used on her sides, flanks and udders. The flank and udder were washed again with a one-percent creolin solution, rinsed and dried. Workers would milk into a fine wire strainer placed over a pail; during milking no talking, laughing, smoking or spitting was permitted, since such behavior was claimed to have a "perceptible effect upon their milk". The workers were required to wash their hands thoroughly after cleaning the udders and before milking each cow. Each worker had a set of towels and washed, cared for and milked 15 or 16 cows. The cattle grazed from early spring until late autumn, and were in the barns only for milking. In 1901, The Trained Nurse and Hospital Review said it doubted that any other large New York-area dairy did this.

The farm had a veterinary chemist and a laboratory for regular milk analysis. Its dairy plant had a visitor-observation area, permitting the viewing of each step of the farm's dairy processing. In one room (separated from the viewing area by glass doors), cream was skimmed; in a second milk was bottled, and in a third butter was churned. The building's sterilizing, pasteurizing, and shipping departments were in the basement. Briarcliff Farms shipped 2,000 US quarts (1,900 L) of milk, 300 US quarts (280 L) of cream and 500 pounds (230 kg) of butter each day. Students from the Ethical Culture School and nurses from New York City hospitals visited the farm to learn about its practices in relation to their work, and Briarcliff Farms was reportedly chosen as the most typical New York industry available for inspection.

=== Greenhouses ===
Briarcliff Rose
From Carmino Ravosa's Briarcliff show

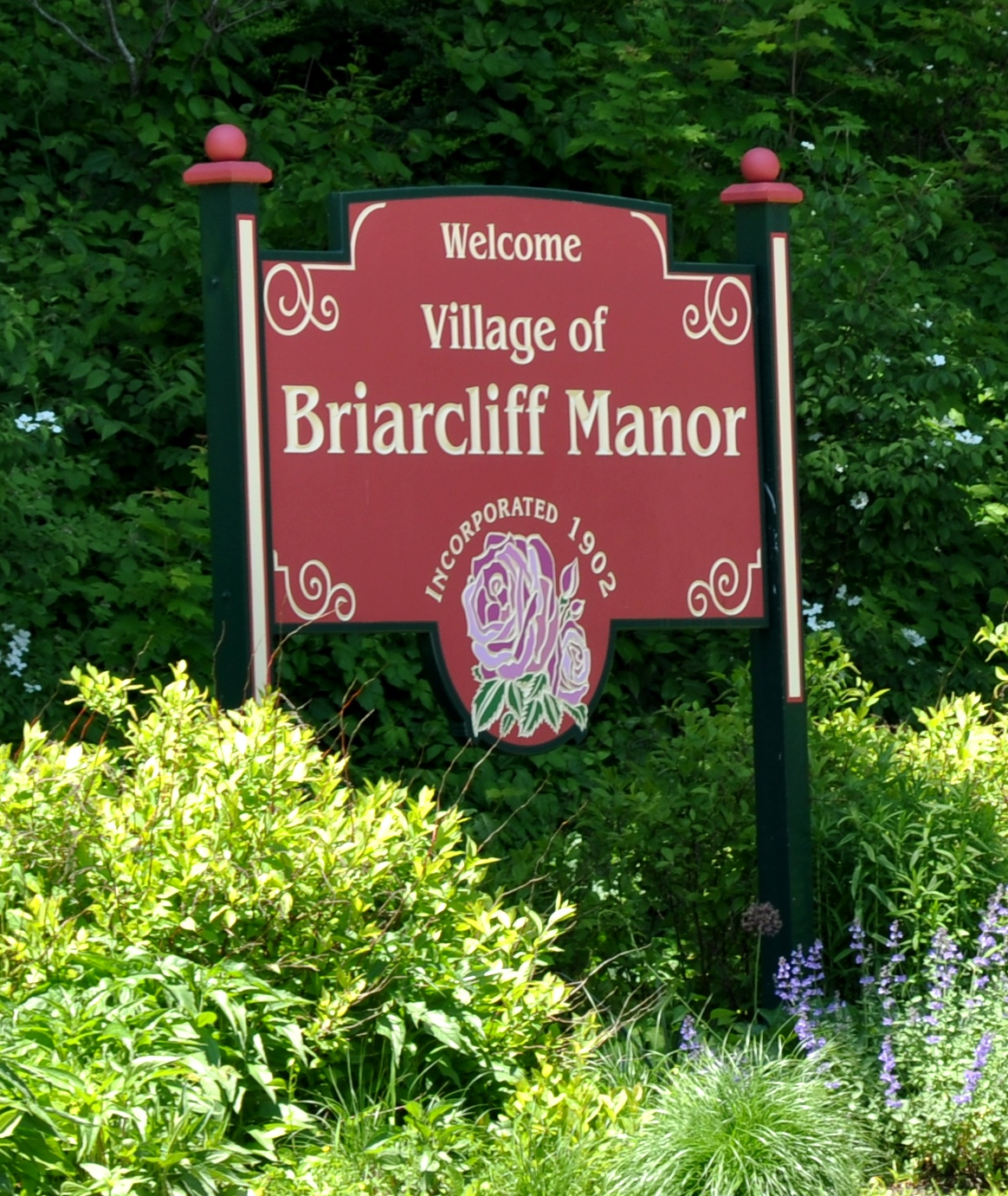
The Briarcliff Rose on a village sign

Although Briarcliff Farms' primary operation was dairy, a secondary agricultural product was its American Beauty rose. The farm had two groups of greenhouses; one, behind Walter Law's house and west of the Briarcliff Lodge, produced decorations for Briarcliff Farms, the Briarcliff Lodge and Law's and his workers' houses. The other group, the Pierson commercial greenhouses, grew the American Beauty rose and rare carnations; it produced 22 varieties and about 2,500 blooms a day. The greenhouses, advanced for their time, had light steel frames and glass panes unique in their "almost unshadowed exposure to the light". The newer greenhouses, 50 by 300 feet (15 by 91 m), held up to 40,000 plants apiece. The Pierson roses, which earned up to $100,000 ($3.87 million in 2025) a year, were sold in winter for eight to 12 cents each with most shipped to New York City. The Briarcliff Lodge sponsored an annual American Beauty carnival with a golf tournament, water sports, moonlight bathing and night diving, a dinner dance, a cinema program and a concert.

Greenhouse foreman George Romaine propagated an American Beauty rose with longer, more-pointed buds and a brighter color, and Paul M. Pierson registered it with the American Rose Society as the Briarcliff Rose. It is Briarcliff Manor's village symbol, and since 2006 has been used on village street signs. Although the Briarcliff Manor Garden Club also uses the Briarcliff Rose as its symbol, the variety is now lost.

== School of Practical Agriculture ==
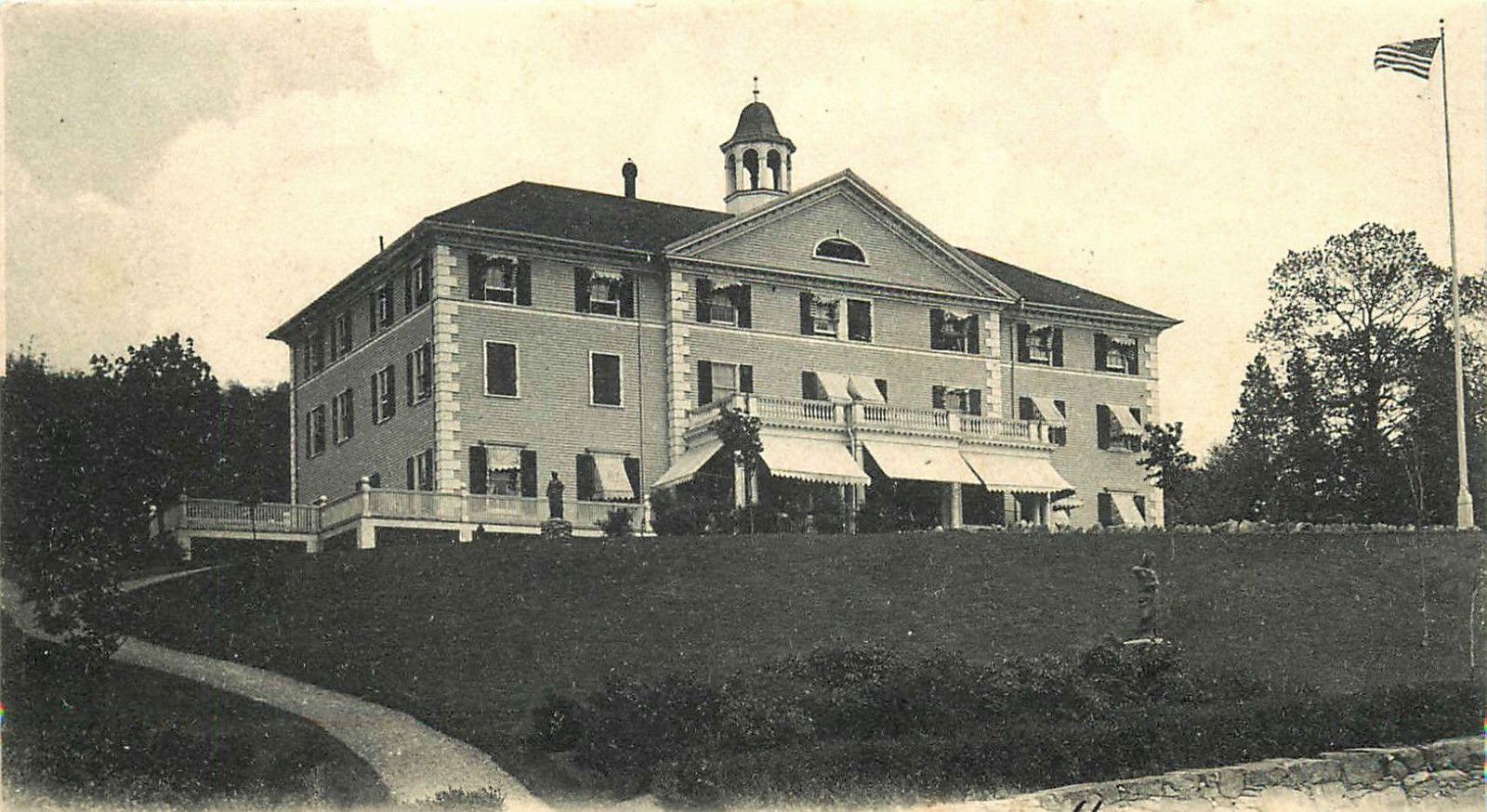
The school's first building

During the winter of 1895–96, the New York Association for Improving the Condition of the Poor researched the causes of youth moving from the country to cities to develop the most efficient method of attracting them back to the country. (Note: The inquiry was specifically made by George T. Powell and a Pennsylvania farmer named Kelgaard in New York City. The two asked state residents, primarily farmers, about urban migration, tenant farming, and principals of agriculture. The direct result of the research was the founding of the School of Practical Agriculture.) That, and an examination of agricultural needs for a year, resulted in meetings at the homes of Abram S. Hewitt and R. Fulton Cutting and the formation of the New York State Committee for the Promotion of Agriculture. The committee, chaired by Hewitt, included Cutting, Jacob H. Schiff, John G. Carlisle, Mrs. Seth Low, Josephine Shaw Lowell, Walter Law and William E. Dodge. Its board of trustees had five officers (with Theodore L. Van Norden president) and seventeen other trustees, including Law, V. Everit Macy and James Speyer. George T. Powell, (Note: Powell was a practical educator and lecturer with Cornell University and the USDA.) a "recognized authority on scientific agriculture" according to The New York Times, was consulted; he later organized the school and became its director. When Walter Law was included the school took shape, since he provided its land and building. In September 1900, Law and the committee established the School of Practical Agriculture and Horticulture as part of Briarcliff Farms, on an elevated 66-acre (27 ha) site about midway between the Briarcliff Manor and Pleasantville train stations on Pleasantville Road. Law leased the 66 acres (which were worth $1,000 ($38,700 in 2025) an acre) for 20 years at the rate of a dollar per year, gave the trustees $30,000 ($1,161,000 in 2025) to build a dormitory and promised them $3,000 ($116,100 in 2025) a year for expenses until the school earned a profit. With that and $30,000 from the trustees, the school opened; the committee focused the curriculum on horticulture, floriculture, gardening and aviculture. The school's progress was followed by members of the public interested in agricultural education.

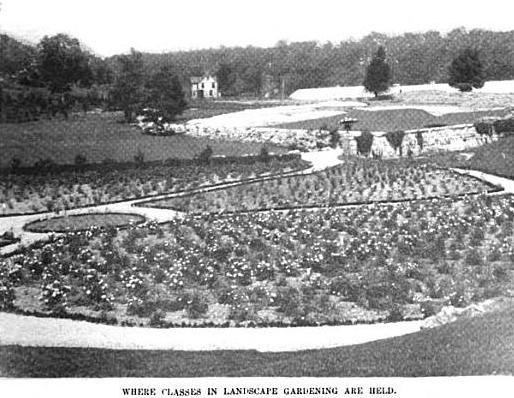
The school's landscape gardens

When it was founded, the school was considered an experiment. Its goal was "to open an independent means of livelihood for young men and women, especially of our cities; to demonstrate that higher values may be obtained from land under intelligent management, and to develop a taste for rural life." Most students were trained in garden and farm operations in a two-year course, with short summer courses in nature study also offered. The academic year had three terms, with twelve weeks of vacation. Although the school allowed new students to begin at any term, a September start was considered the most desirable. Instruction was offered in agriculture, horticulture, cold storage, botany, chemistry, geology, physics, agricultural zoology, entomology, beekeeping, meteorology, land surveying and leveling, soils, drainage, irrigation, tillage, fertilizers, plant diseases, stock, fruit growing, landscape gardening and bookkeeping. It was a practical school, with no attempt to provide a general education. Work included caring for orchard trees and bush fruit, greenhouse culture of fruits and vegetables, jelly- and jam-making, market gardening, tillage, fertilizer use, hybridizing and propagating flowers, harvesting and marketing crops. The school used Briarcliff Farms, where students worked the land, tested milk and cared for a variety of animals. Students also raised flowers, vegetables and fruit, and accompanied their products to cities for marketing. The New York Botanical Garden arranged with the school for student access to its lectures, museums and conservatories. Tuition was $100 a year ($3,900 in 2025), and board $280 a year ($10,800 in 2025). Instruction was primarily weekday-morning lectures with laboratory work; during the afternoon, students worked on the school farm (which had a foreman, gardener and several workmen to ensure continuous operation) under instructor supervision. In 1901 35 students attended, followed by 34 in 1902 (almost all from cities), ranging in age from 16 to 35. Most had a high-school education before enrolling, and some had been to college. The school had a capacity of 35 students, and planned to expand.

For one year it met in the basement of Pleasantville's public school (until the Briarcliff Farms building was completed), and did not provide housing. The farm building was completed in spring 1901 and dedicated on May 15. The large Colonial Revival building, with a plain exterior and wide halls, had lecture halls, a library, a laboratory, an office, a dining hall and dormitory space for 40 staff members and students. Its grounds had an orchard, a working garden, experimental greenhouses, poultry houses, a farmhouse and barns. The school's faculty included a director, a horticulturalist, an agriculturalist and instructors in nature study and cold storage. It was coeducational, with identical courses for men and women. Students were required to be proficient in English, provide good references, be at least 16 years of age, and be in good health. On January 1, 1902 Henry Francis du Pont, then in his third year at Harvard University, wrote to Powell requesting admission to the school; Powell replied that DuPont was listed first in the school's 1903 class. However, DuPont was unable to attend and left Harvard (perhaps due to his mother's sudden death in autumn 1902).

=== Relocation and closure ===
The school outgrew its Briarcliff location, and in autumn 1902 R. Fulton Cutting purchased a 415-acre (168 ha) farm near Poughkeepsie as a permanent upstate location. Prior to the move, the school was popularly known as the Briarcliff School, and after moving it became formally known as the School of Practical Agriculture at Poughkeepsie. When the school was established there, Theodore Van Norden said that it needed funds for equipment and an endowment. The land had no buildings, and thus the school rented two houses in Poughkeepsie until funds were obtained to build. It initially hoped to raise one million dollars; in 1903, after raising $50,000 ($1.79 million in 2025) of a hoped-for $150,000 ($5.38 million in 2025) to operate the school, director George Powell announced that it would close and the property would be sold. Cutting presented a plan to the New Hampshire College of Agriculture and the Mechanic Arts to carry out the plan devised for the school in Poughkeepsie. In 1908, school funds were donated to Cornell University as the Agricultural Student Loan Fund for students in Cornell's College of Agriculture and Life Sciences.

From 1903 to 1905 the original school building was known as Pocantico Lodge, a small year-round hotel. In 1905 Alice Knox, an employee at Mrs. Dow's School, opened Miss Knox's School in the building. Destroyed by fire in 1912, the school moved to nearby Tarrytown and then to Cooperstown. The Knox School moved to St. James, on Long Island, in 1954. The only remaining feature of the Pocantico Lodge building is a stone retaining wall in front of the current building on the site, built in 1925 by Oscar Vatet for Rufus P. Johnston (pastor of John D. Rockefeller's Fifth Avenue Baptist Church). The building, later occupied by Arthur O'Connor, Cognitronics, and Frank B. Hall, is currently an unused part of Briarcliff Corporate Campus.

== Farm status ==
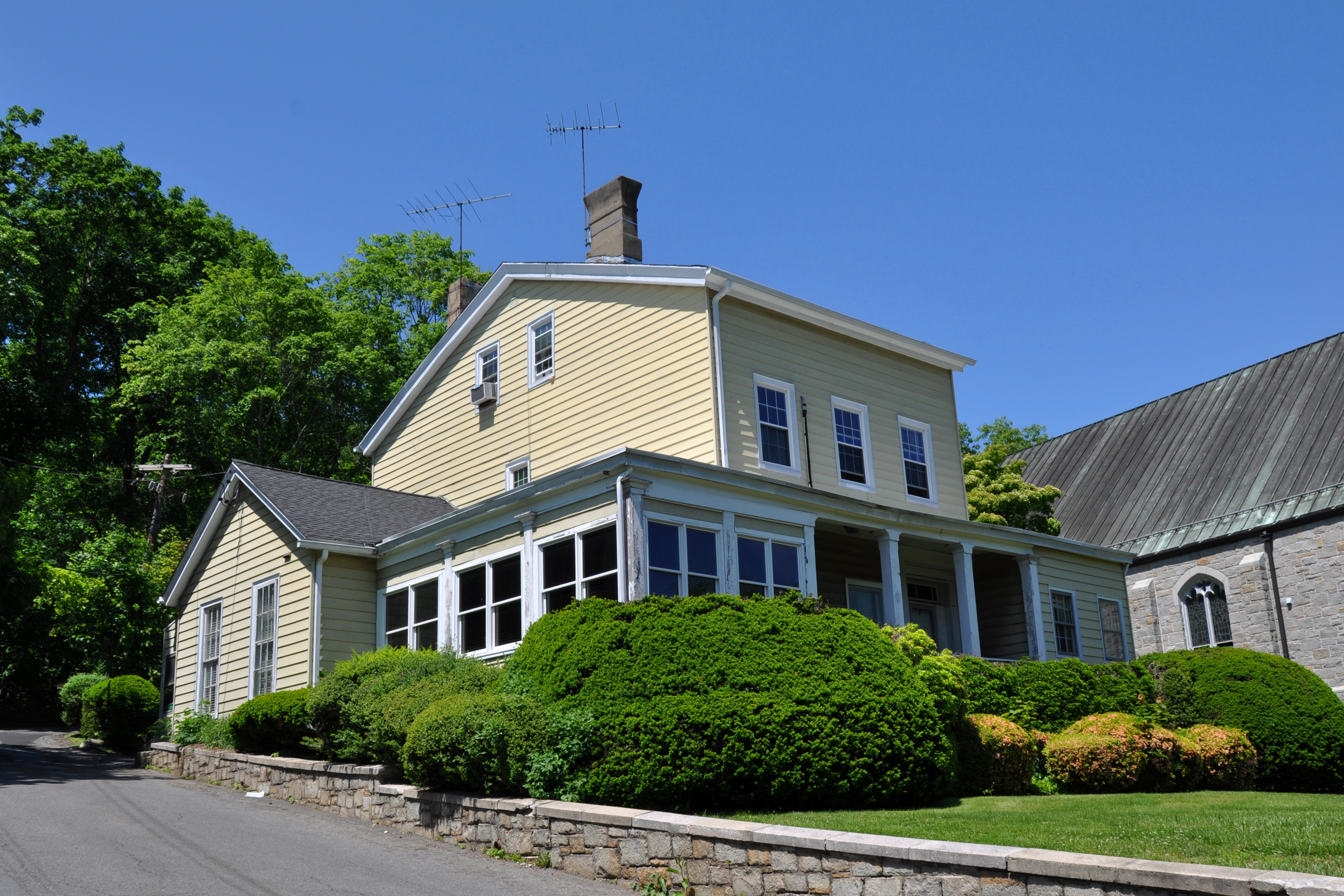
The original farmhouse, now the rectory of St. Theresa's Catholic Church

Most of the Pine Plains farmland is occupied by Berkshire Stud, a Thoroughbred breeding farm which purchased 550 acres (220 ha) beginning in 1983, and the Mashomack Polo Club (which owns the farmhouse on Halcyon Lake). The farm's creamery and several barns (some built during the 19th century) still stand at the polo club, and have been used since the 1980s for stables, farm-equipment storage and the raising of sporting birds. The barns also housed the Triangle Arts Association (part of the Triangle Arts Trust) from 1982 to 1993.

In Briarcliff Manor, part of the original Stillman farmhouse survives as the rectory of St. Theresa's Catholic Church and several employee wood-framed cottages still stand on Dalmeny and Old Briarcliff Roads. Similar houses are on South State, Pleasantville, and Poplar Roads. The farm's dairy building is owned by Consolidated Edison; the company also owns a nearby building which formerly housed the Briarcliff Manor Light and Power Company. The Plasmon Company of America's Woodside Avenue factory is now an automotive restoration facility.

== Gallery ==
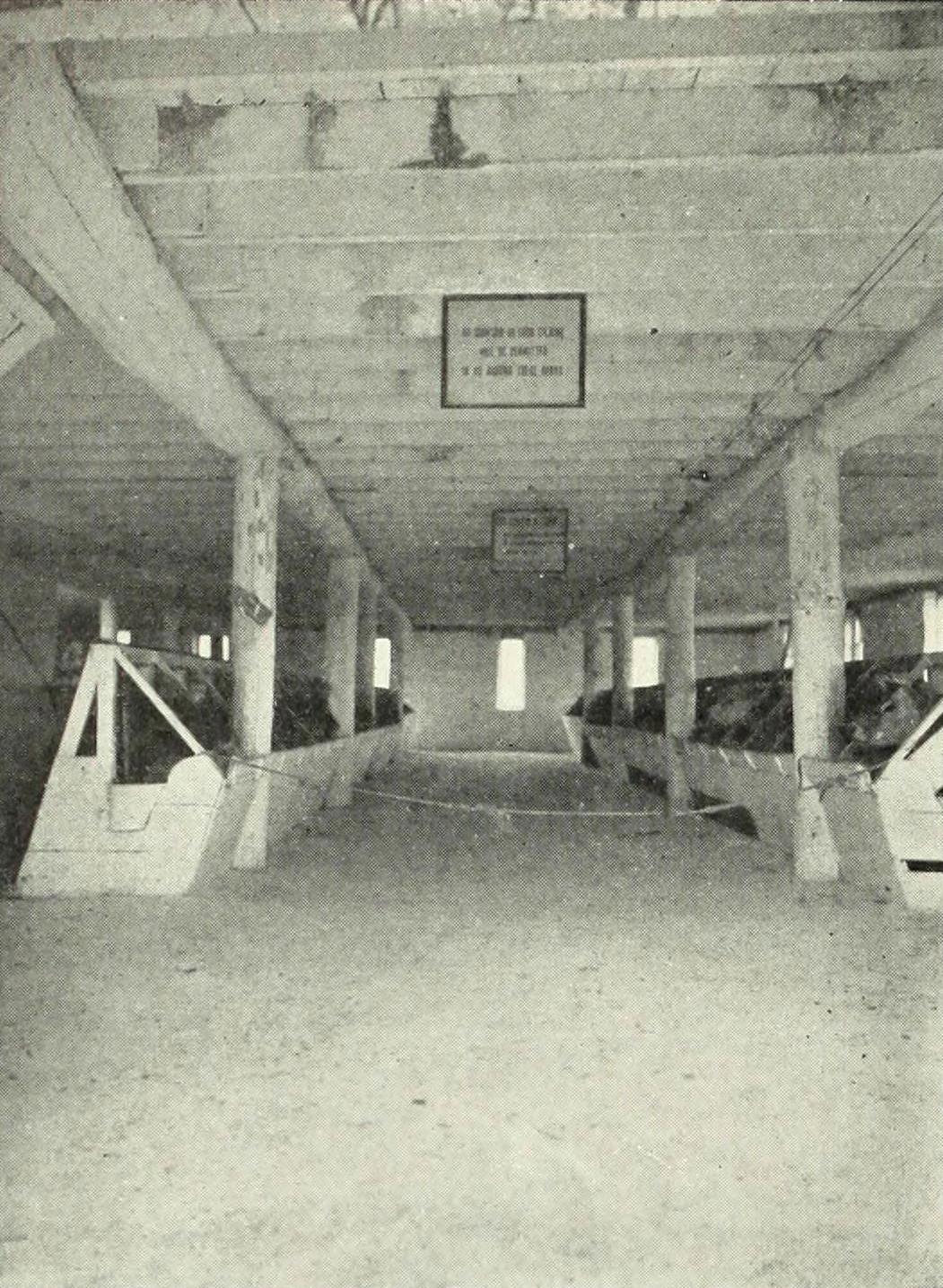
Section of the cow barns, with Law's mottoes overhead

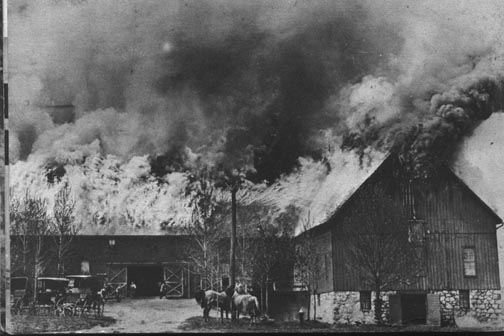
April 28, 1913 Dalmeny Road barn fire, next door to Briarcliff Fire Company headquarters

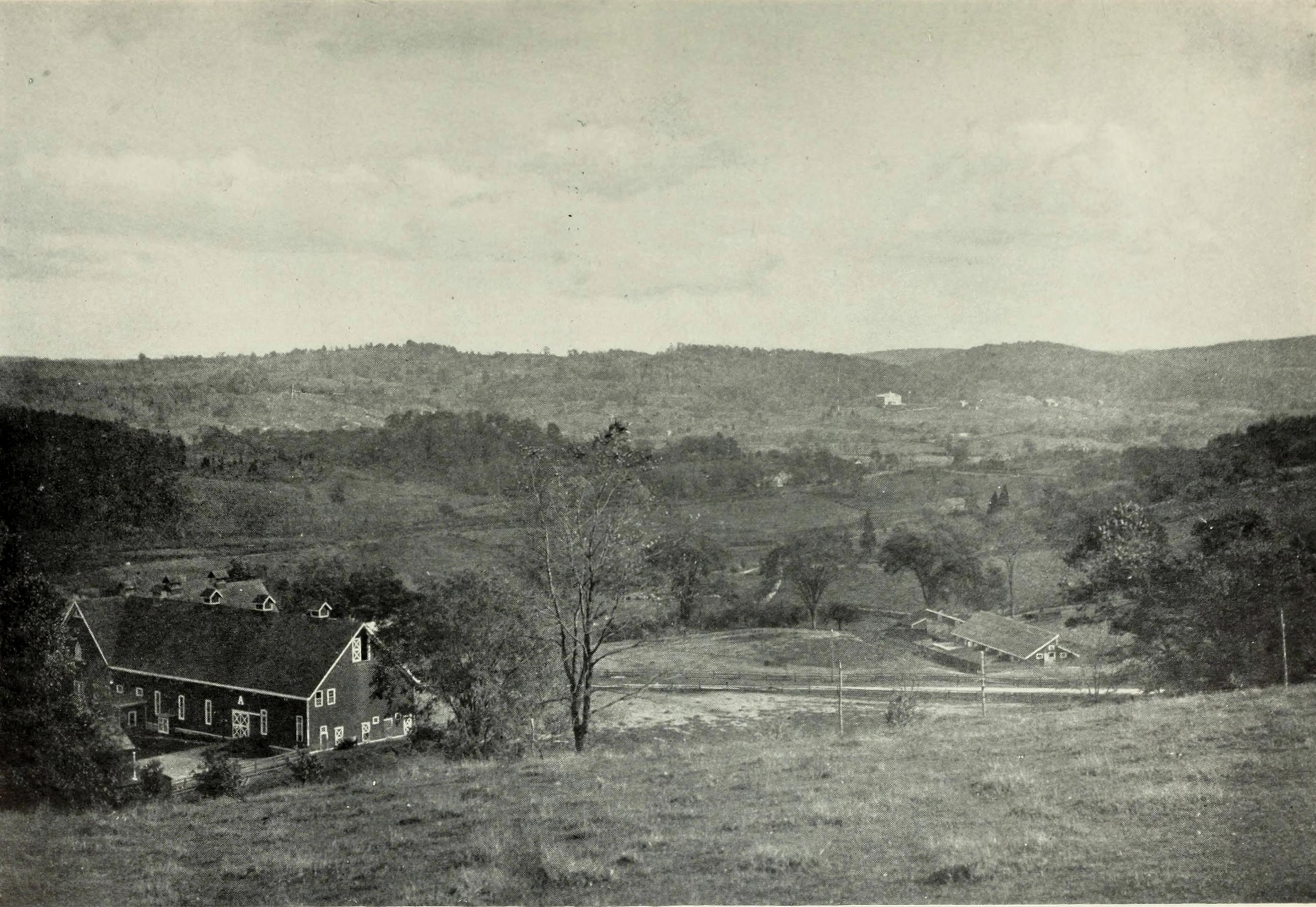
Pocantico Valley, with Barn A in the foreground and the school in the background

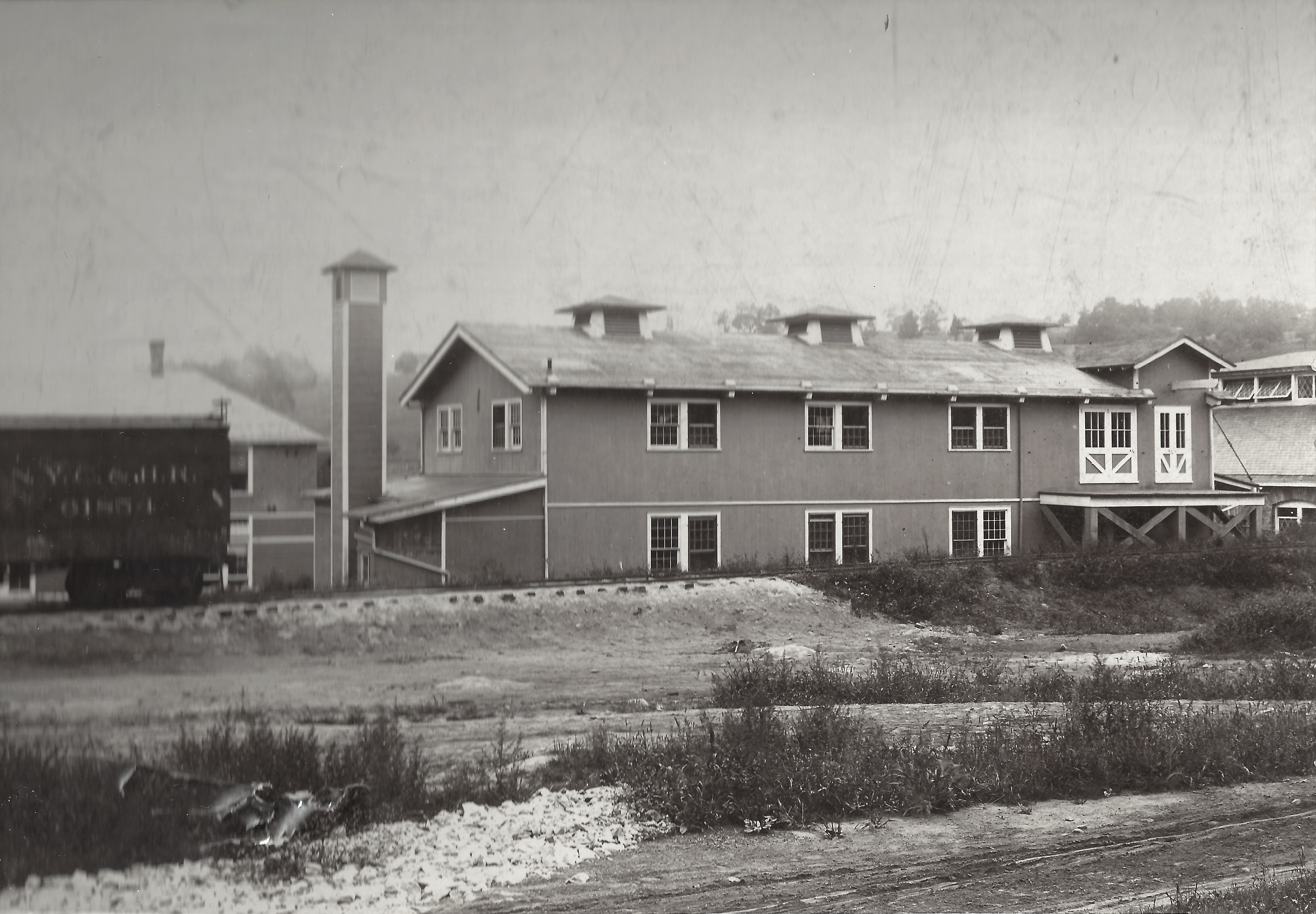
The plasmon factory, now an automotive restoration facility

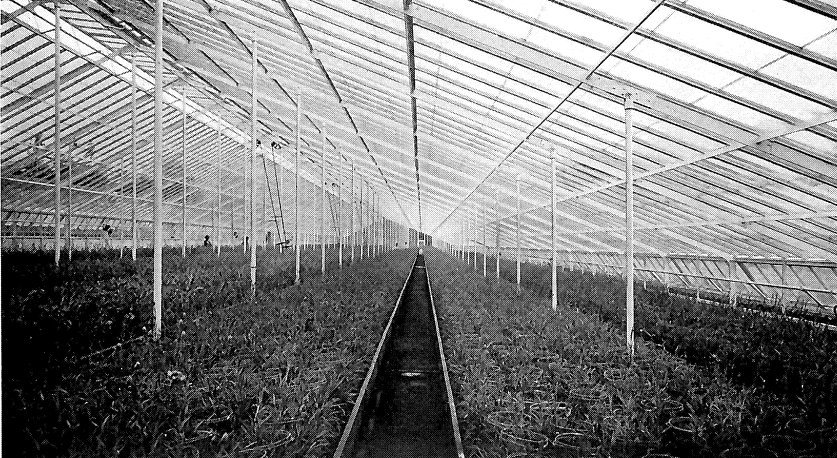
One of the 306-foot-long greenhouses

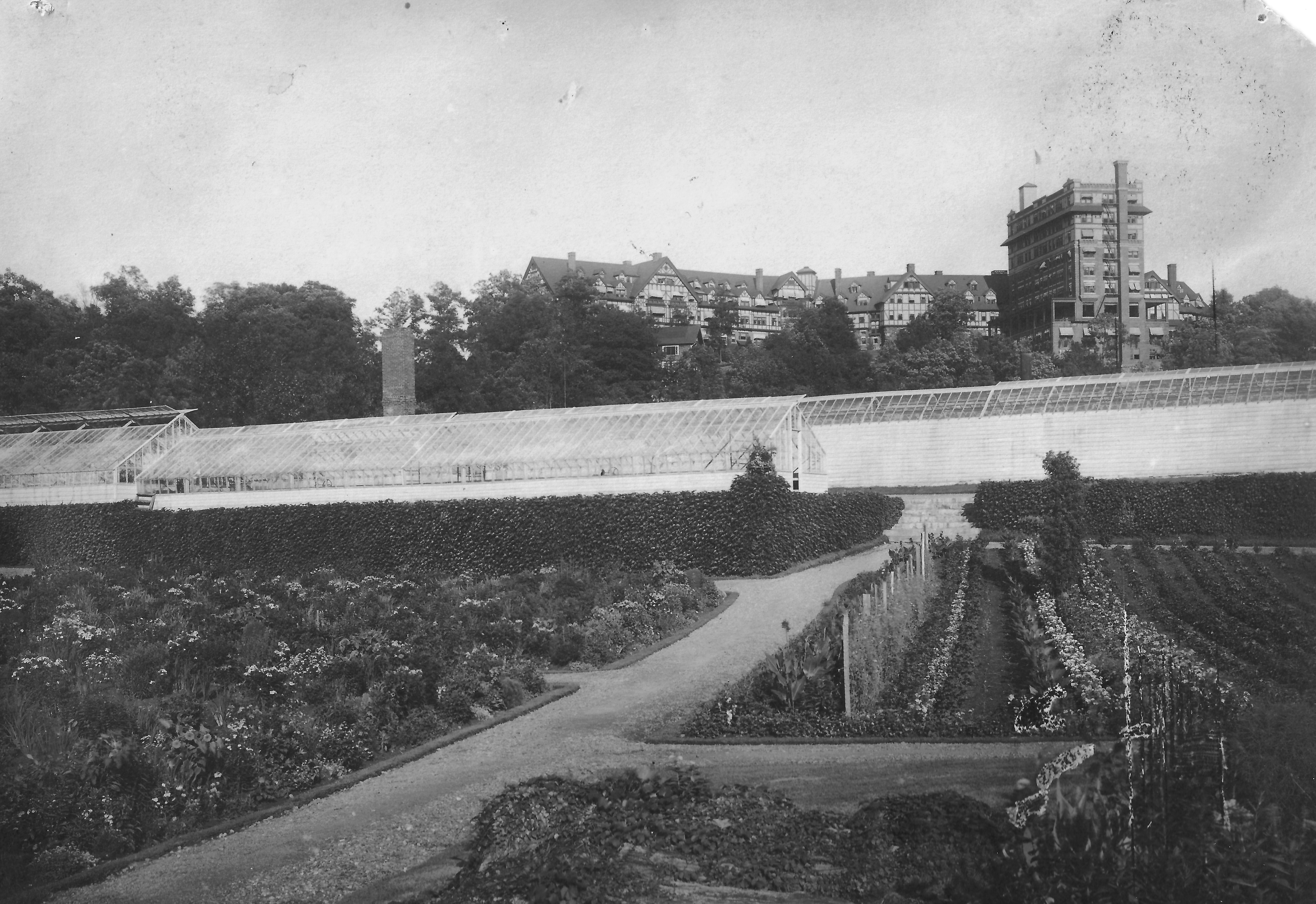
Greenhouses near the Briarcliff Lodge

== See also ==
- History of Briarcliff Manor, New York
- History of New York
- Agriculture in the United States
