= List of Delta Kappa Epsilon members =

Delta Kappa Epsilon is a North American college fraternity.It was established on June 22, 1844, at Yale College in New Haven, Connecticut. The following is a list of some notable members of Delta Kappa Epsilon.

== Academia ==
- James Barr Ames, Alpha – 2nd Dean of Harvard Law School
- James R. Angell, Omicron – president of Yale University
- Wilder Dwight Bancroft, Alpha – chemistry professor at Cornell University
- Bruce D. Benson, Delta Chi – president of the University of Colorado
- Arthur Pierce Butler, Alpha – co-founder and headmaster of Morristown School
- Charles W. Cole, Sigma – president of Amherst College; United States Ambassador to Chile
- Archibald Cary Coolidge, Alpha – first director of the Harvard University Library from 1910 to 1928
- Melvil Dewey, Sigma – librarian, founder of the Columbia University School of Library Service, devised the Dewey Decimal System
- Gregory L. Fenves. Delta Chi – president of Emory University and the University of Texas
- Arthur Twining Hadley, Phi – president of Yale University
- Ernest Martin Hopkins, Pi – president of Dartmouth College
- Charles Loring Jackson, Alpha – organic chemist, professor, and chairman of the Division of Chemistry at Harvard University
- Harry Pratt Judson – president of the University of Chicago
- Martin Kellogg, Phi – president of the University of California at Berkeley
- Stanley King, Sigma – president of Amherst College
- George Edwin MacLean – president of the University of Iowa and chancellor of the University of Nebraska
- Walter A. McDougall, Sigma – professor of history at the University of Pennsylvania; recipient of the 1985 Pulitzer Prize for Biography
- Robert J. McMullen, Iota – president of Centre College
- Cyrus Northrop, Phi – president of the University of Minnesota
- Calvin Plimpton, Sigma – president of Amherst College and American University of Beirut
- Ira Remson – president of Johns Hopkins University
- Benno C. Schmidt Jr., Phi – president of Yale University
- Kenneth C. M. Sills – president of Bowdoin College
- William Codman Sturgis, Alpha – mycologist and dean of the School of Forestry at Colorado College
- Kent Syverud – president of Syracuse University
- Ezra Ripley Thayer, Alpha – Dean of Harvard Law School
- George Edgar Vincent, Phi – president of the University of Minnesota
- Francis Amasa Walker, Sigma – president of the Massachusetts Institute of Technology
- Barrett Wendell, Alpha – professor of English at Harvard University, known for writing a series of textbooks
- Justin Winsor, Alpha – librarian, historian, first president of the American Library Association
- Francis Woodman, Alpha – co-founder and headmaster of Morristown School

== Architecture ==
- Frederick H. Brooke, Phi – architect
- Walter Cook, Alpha – architect with Babb, Cook & Willard
- Charles Allerton Coolidge, Alpha – architect
- Bowdoin B. Crowninshield, Alpha – naval architect who specialized in racing yachts
- Robert Trent Jones, Delta Chi – golf course architect
- Herbert Leeds, Alpha – yachtsman and golf course architect
- William Winthrop Kent, Alpha – architect
- Henry Chapman Mercer, Alpha – tilemaker and designer of Fonthill, the Moravian Pottery and Tile Works and the Mercer Museum; curator of American and prehistoric archaeology of the University of Pennsylvania Museum
- Robert Swain Peabody, Alpha – architect
- J. Pickering Putnam, Alpha – architect
- Arthur Rotch, Alpha – architect
- Isaac Newton Phelps Stokes, Alpha – architect
- Richard Clipston Sturgis, Alpha – architect
- Edmund M. Wheelwright, Alpha – architect
- James Bosley Noel Wyatt, Alpha – architect

== Art ==
- Francis Brooks Chadwick, Alpha – painter
- Dale Chihuly, Kappa Epsilon – glass artist
- Frederic Crowninshield, Alpha – painter
- Ralph Wormeley Curtis, Alpha – painter and graphic artist
- Augustus C. Gurnee, Alpha – socialite and art patron
- Lawren Harris, Alpha Phi, – artist and member of the Group of Seven
- Troy Kinney, Phi – artist
- Edward Simmons, Alpha – painter
- William A. Slater, Alpha – art collector who established the Slater Memorial Museum
- Edward Perry Warren, Alpha – art collector
- Charles Goddard Weld, Alpha – art collector who made major contributions to Museum of Fine Arts, Boston and the Peabody Essex Museum

== Business ==
- Rodolphe L. Agassiz, Alpha – polo player and chairman of the board of the Calumet and Hecla Mining Company
- John F. Akers, Phi – past president of IBM
- Frederick Lothrop Ames, Alpha – co-founder of General Electric, vice president of the Old Colony Railroad, and director of the Union Pacific Railroad
- William Henry Baldwin Jr., Alpha – president of the Long Island Rail Road
- Edward Bausch, Beta Phi – president of Bausch & Lomb Opticals
- August Belmont Jr., Alpha – finacier and head of the Interborough Rapid Transit Company
- Alfred R. Berkeley III Eta – former Nasdaq president
- Roland Betts, Phi – founder, chairman and CEO of Chelsea Piers
- James Cunningham Bishop, Alpha – banker and officer of the Welsbach Street Illuminating Company
- Alfred Bloomingdale, Upsilon – founder of Diners Club International
- Matthew Borden, Phi – industrialist
- Lawrence Bossidy, Mu – chairman of Honeywell
- Charles Sterling Bunnell, Phi – director of CitiBank
- Dave Calhoun, Sigma Alpha – president and CEO Boeing
- James Boorman Colgate, Mu – founder and president of the New York Gold Exchange
- Frederic Adrian Delano, Alpha – first vice chairman of the Federal Reserve and president of the Wheeling and Lake Erie Railroad, the Wabash Pittsburgh Terminal Railway, and the Wabash Railroad
- Donald Fisher, Theta Zeta – founder and past chairman of Gap Inc.
- Theodore J. Forstmann, Phi – financier, subject of the book and movie Barbarians at the Gate.
- Amos Tuck French, Alpha – member of the New York Stock Exchange and vice-president of the Manhattan Trust Company
- James Gamble, Lambda – co-founder of Procter & Gamble
- William A. Gaston, Alpha – president of the Boston Elevated Railway and National Shawmut Bank
- Rutherford P. Hayes, Delta Chi – banker, developer, and librarian
- Webb Hayes, Delta Chi – co-founder the forerunner of Union Carbide; Private Secretary to the President
- Henry J. Heinz, Phi – founder of Heinz
- Walter Hoving, Upsilon – chairman of Tiffany & Co.
- George Ward Holdrege, Alpha – general manager Burlington and Missouri River Railroad Company
- Herb Kelleher, Gamma Phi – co-founder and CEO of Southwest Airlines
- Thomas W. Lamont, Alpha – vice president of First National Bank
- Robert Lehman, Phi – banker and head of Lehman Brothers
- Craig McCaw, Sigma Rho – founder of McCaw Communications
- George H. Mifflin, Alpha – president of Houghton Mifflin
- J. P. Morgan Jr., Alpha – banker and finance executive
- Vasant Narasimhan, Delta Delta – CEO of Novartis
- Henry T. Oxnard, Alpha – founder and president of the American Beet Sugar Company
- Bradley Palmer, Alpha – lawyer involved with the creation of Gillette Safety Razor Co., the International Telephone & Telegraph Corporation, and the United Fruit Company
- Frederick H. Rindge, Alpha – real estate developer and founder of present-day Malibu, California
- Charles Robert Sanger, Alpha – professor of chemistry at Harvard University
- George R. Sheldon, Alpha – banker, finacier, and a leading force in the Trust Company of America
- Frederick W. Smith, Phi – founder and chairman of FedEx
- James J. Storrow, Alpha – partner of Lee, Higginson & Co.; president of General Motors Nash Motors; president of the Boy Scouts of America
- Oscar Tang, Phi – financier and philanthropist
- Robert J. Thorne, Delta Chi – president of Montgomery Ward
- Hamilton McKown Twombly, Alpha – co-founder of the American Sulphur Company, later the Union Sulphur Company; financial advisor to William Henry Vanderbilt
- August H. Vogel, Alpha – vice-president of Pfister & Vogel
- Fiske Warren, Alpha – president of the S. D. Warren Paper Co., developer of single-tax colonies, and tennis champion
- Grinnell Willis, Alpha – textile merchant
- Joseph Wilson, Beta Phi – founder and president of Xerox
- Robert Winsor, Alpha – head of Kidder, Peabody & Company
- Dean Witter Jr., Phi – founder of Dean Witter & Co. (now part of Morgan Stanley)
- William Wrigley III, Phi – presidents of Wrigley Company

== Entertainment ==
- Frank Batten, Eta – founder of the Weather Channel
- Dick Clark, Phi Gamma – host of American Bandstand and Dick Clark's New Year's Rockin' Eve
- Billy Crudup, Beta – actor
- Marcus Giamatti, Theta – actor
- Harry Hamlin, Theta Zeta – actor
- Hagood Hardy, Alpha Phi – pianist and composer
- Howard Hawks, Delta Chi – film director, producer, and screenwriter
- Charles Ives, Phi – composer and recipient of the 1947 Pulitzer Prize for Music
- Michael Macari, Epsilon Rho – film producer
- Tex McCrary, Phi – radio and television personality
- David Milch, Phi – writer and producer
- Cole Porter, Phi – composer
- Ryan Serhant, Tau – cast member of Million Dollar Listing New York
- Root Boy Slim, Phi – rock singer
- Chris Strouth, Phi Epsilon – musician, producer, writer, and filmmaker
- Ming Tsai, Phi – fusion cuisine chef, restaurateur, and Emmy Award-winning television personality
- Jonathan Winters, Lambda – comedian and writer
- Josh Zuckerman, Zeta – actor
- Ben Paterson, Delta Delta – jazz pianist

== Government ==
- Wilson S. Bissell, Phi – United States Postmaster General
- Roy G. Finch – New York State Engineer and Surveyor
- Henry Clay Hall – chairman of the Interstate Commerce Commission; mayor of Colorado Springs, Colorado
- George H. Lyman, Alpha – Collector of Customs for the Port of Boston and chairman of the Massachusetts Republican Party
- Thomas Mott Osborne, Alpha – Warden of Sing Sing; commander of Portsmouth Naval Prison; mayor of Auburn, New York; New York Public Service Commission
- Hirai Seijirō, Psi Omega – president of the Imperial Government Railways
- Sargent Shriver, Phi – founder and first director of the Peace Corps
- Sidney W. Souers, Kappa – first director of the Central Intelligence Agency
- William L. Trenholm, Delta – United States Comptroller of the Currency; president of North American Trust Company

== Law ==
- Brooks Adams, Alpha – lawyer, political scientist, and critic of capitalism
- Francis R. Appleton, Alpha – lawyer with Robbins & Appleton
- Peter Townsend Barlow, Alpha – New York City magistrate
- Charles P. Barnes – Chief Justice of the Maine Supreme Judicial Court; Speaker of the Maine House of Representatives
- Norman L. Bassett – justice of the Maine Supreme Judicial Court
- Edmund L. Baylies, Alpha – lawyer; personal counsel to Cornelius Vanderbilt III; president of the Vanderbilt Hotel Corporation
- Charles F. Brown – judge of the New York Supreme Court, judge of the New York Court of Appeals, Secretary of New York State
- Harold H. Burton, Theta – justice of the Supreme Court of the United States, United States Senate, Mayor of Cleveland
- Mortimer W. Byers – chief judge of the United States District Court for the Eastern District of New York
- John Hessin Clarke, Beta Chi – justice of the Supreme Court of the United States
- Asa Bird Gardiner, Nu – New York County District Attorney
- George Alexander Gale, Alpha Phi – chief justice of Ontario
- Paul M. Hebert, Zeta Zeta – judge of United States Military Tribunals in Nuremberg
- James H. Hudson – associate justice of the Maine Supreme Judicial Court
- Samuel Furman Hunt – judge advocate general of Ohio, judge of the Superior Court of Cincinnati, president pro tempore of the Ohio Senate
- James H. Hudson – justice of the Maine Supreme Judicial Court
- Brett Kavanaugh, Phi – justice of the Supreme Court of the United States
- James Truesdell Kilbreth, Alpha – lawyer, New York City Police justice, Court of Special Sessions justice, and Collector of the Port of New York
- Arno W. King – justice of the Maine Supreme Judicial Court
- Ira Lloyd Letts – judge of the United States District Court for the District of Rhode Island
- Edmund H. Lewis – justice of the New York Supreme Court and the Chief Judge of the New York Court of Appeals
- William Loring, Alpha – justice of the Massachusetts Supreme Judicial Court
- James Arnold Lowell, Alpha – judge of the United States District Court for the District of Massachusetts
- Louis W. Marcus – justice of the New York Supreme Court
- Avery Lenoir Matlock - prosecuting attorney, Montague Co.,Texas, later Ft. Worth. Texas Legislature (House and Senate). As "manager" of the 3 million-acre XIT Ranch, which spanned 10 counties in the Texas Panhandle, he successfully cleared out the desperados and cattle rustlers. The DKE catalogs erroneously list him as Avery Senior Matlock..Catalog DKE 1900
- Thomas Francis McAllister – chief judge of the United States Court of Appeals for the Sixth Circuit
- John James McCook, Alpha – corporate lawyer
- William D. Mitchelli – United States Attorney General and United States Solicitor General
- Peter B. Olney, Alpha – New York County District Attorney, Referee in Bankruptcy, and attorney
- Frank Nesmith Parsons, Pi – chief justice of the New Hampshire Supreme Court
- Francis Key Pendleton, Alpha – justice of the Supreme Court of New York and Corporation Counsel of New York City
- Cuthbert W. Pound – Chief Judge of the New York Court of Appeals
- Potter Stewart, Phi – justice of the Supreme Court of the United States
- Nathaniel Tompkins – justice of the Maine Supreme Judicial Court, president of the Maine Senate, speaker of the Maine House of Representatives
- Arthur T. Vanderbilt – chief justice of the New Jersey Supreme Court; dean of New York University School of Law
- Samuel D. Warren II, Alpha – lawyer and co-founder of Nutter McClennen & Fish
- Francis S. Wilson – justice of the Illinois Supreme Court
- Francis Joseph Wing, Alpha – Judge of the United States District Court for the Northern District of Ohio

== Literature and journalism ==
- Edward Bellamy, Theta Chi – author
- Norman Chandler, Sigma Rho – publisher of Los Angeles Times
- Otis Chandler, Sigma Rho – publisher of Los Angeles Times
- John Jay Chapman, Alpha – writer, poet, and essayist
- George Ticknor Curtis – biographer
- Virginius Dabney, Eta – 1948 Pulitzer Prize for Editorial Writing
- Briton Hadden, Phi – co-founder of Time Magazine
- Ira B. Harkey Jr., Tau Lambda – journalist and recipient of the 1963 Pulitzer Prize for Editorial Writing
- Julian Hawthorne – author and poet
- Nathaniel Hawthorne, Theta – author
- William Randolph Hearst, Alpha – publisher, founder of Hearst Newspapers, and United States House of Representatives
- Robert Herrick, Alpha – novelist
- Edward Knoblock, Alpha – playwright and novelist
- Edward Jackson Lowell, Alpha – author of historical nonfiction and lawyer
- Edward Sandford Martin, Alpha – chief editorial editor and literary editor of Life Magaziner
- John Bach McMaster – historian and writer
- William H. Peck, Alpha – writer
- David Graham Phillips – novelist and journalist
- Eugene C. Pulliam, Psi Phi – newspaper editor and publisher
- Ken Purdy, Rho Delta – editor of Parade, Car and Driver, and True
- James C. Quayle, Psi Phi – newspaper publisher
- Whitelaw Reid, Kappa – editor-in-chief of the New York Tribune
- Henry Dwight Sedgwick, Alpha – author
- John Wright Sifton, Alpha Tau – president of Manitoba Free Press
- William Roscoe Thayer, Alpha – author and editor
- Bayard Tuckerman, Alpha – biographer and historian
- Owen Wister, Alpha – writer known for The Virginian

== Medicine ==
- James P. Allison, Omega Chi – immunologist; 2018 Nobel Prize for Medicine
- John Templeton Bowen, Alpha – dermatologist and professor of dermatology at Massachusetts General Hospital
- William A. Brooks, Alpha – surgeon and academic
- Arthur Tracy Cabot, Alpha – surgeon at the Massachusetts General Hospital; curator of the Harvard Dental Museum
- James Read Chadwick, Alpha – gynecologist and medical librarian
- Ernest Amory Codman, Alpha – surgeon
- John Green Curtis, Alpha – physiologist with the Columbia University College of Physicians and Surgeons
- Harvey Cushing, Phi – neurosurgeon, pathologist, and recipient of the 1926 Pulitzer Prize for Biography
- Thomas Dwight, Alpha – physician, anatomist, and professor of anatomy at Harvard Medical
- John F. Enders, Phi – medical researcher; 1954 Nobel Prize for Medicine
- Robert Means Lawrence, Alpha – physician at the Boston Dispensary and author
- Charles McBurney, Alpha – surgeon-in-chief of the Roosevelt Hospital (now Mount Sinai West)
- George Howard Monks, Alpha – surgeon and academic known for inventing board games such as Chinese checkers, Basilinda, and Halma
- E. H. Nichols, Alpha – surgeon and clinical professor of surgery at Harvard Medical School
- Morton Prince, Alpha – physician who specialized in neurology and abnormal psychology
- Thomas Morgan Rotch, Alpha – pediatric doctor, first full professor of pediatrics in the United States

== Military ==
- Winthrop Astor Chanler, Alpha – member of the Rough Riders in the Spanish–American War
- Harvey Weir Cook, Psi Phi – flying ace in World War I
- Martin Witherspoon Gary, Alpha – brigadier general in the Confederate States Army and South Carolina Senate
- Peyton C. March, Rho – Chief of Staff of the United States Army
- Robert Peary, Theta – explorer and officer in the United States Navy; first man to reach the North Pole
- James R. Soley, Alpha – Assistant Secretary of the Navy; head of the Office of Naval Records and Library; instructor at the United States Naval War College; head of the Department of English Studies, History, and Law at the United States Naval Academy
- Gordon Woodbury, Alpha – Assistant Secretary of the Navy

== Politics ==
=== Presidents ===
- George H. W. Bush, Phi – 41st President of the United States
- George W. Bush, Phi – 43rd President of the United States
- Gerald R. Ford, Omicron – 38th President of the United States
- Rutherford B. Hayes, Delta Chi – 19th President of the United States
- Mario García Menocal, Delta Chi – President of the Republic of Cuba
- Franklin D. Roosevelt, Alpha – 32nd President of the United States
- Theodore Roosevelt, Alpha – 26th President of the United States

=== Vice presidents ===
- J. Danforth Quayle, Psi Phi – Vice President of the United States

=== U.S. Cabinet ===
- Dean Acheson, Phi – United States Secretary of State, received the 1970 Pulitzer Prize for History
- Charles Francis Adams III, Alpha – United States Secretary of the Navy; Mayor of Quincy
- Joshua W. Alexander – United States Secretary of Commerce, United States House of Representatives
- Robert Bacon, Alpha – United States Secretary of State and United States Ambassador to France
- Thomas F. Bayard – United States Secretary of State, United States Ambassador to the United Kingdom, United States Senate
- James G. Blaine, Theta – United States Secretary of State; Speaker of the United States House of Representatives
- Charles S. Fairchild, Alpha – United States Secretary of the Treasury, Attorney General of New York
- Gordon Gray, Beta – Assistant Secretary of War
- Hilary A. Herbert – United States Secretary of the Navy; United States House of Representatives
- Robert Todd Lincoln, Alpha – United States Secretary of War and Minister to the United Kingdom
- Victor H. Metcalf – United States Secretary of the Navy, United States Secretary of Commerce and Labor, United States House of Representatives
- George Von L. Meyer, Alpha – Secretary of the Navy; United States Postmaster General, United States Ambassador to Russia,United States Ambassador to Italy
- George Von L. Meyer, Alpha – United States Secretary of the Navy, United States Postmaster General, U.S. ambassidor to Russia, United States Ambassidor to Italy, and Speaker of the Massachusetts House of Representatives
- Kenneth Claiborne Royall – United States Secretary of War, United States Secretary of the Army
- William E. Simon, Rho – Secretary of the Treasury
- Richard W. Thompson, Psi Phi – Secretary of the Navy
- John De Witt Warner, Delta Chi – United States House of Representatives

=== U.S. Senate ===
- Albert J. Beveridge, Psi Phi – United States Senate
- Calvin S. Brice – United States Senate; chair of the Democratic National Committee
- Matthew Butler, Delta – United States Senate
- Chris Coons, Sigma – United States Senate
- Royal S. Copeland, Omicron – United States Senate
- Thomas Eagleton, Sigma – United States Senate, Lieutenant Governor of Missouri, Attorney General of Missouri
- Lister Hill, Psi – United States Senate
- Henry Cabot Lodge, Alpha – United States Senate and United States House of Representatives
- Russell B. Long, Zeta Zeta – Senate Majority Whip
- George B. Martin – United States Senate
- Kenneth McKellar – United States Senate, United States House of Representatives
- Leverett Saltonstall, Alpha – United States Senate and Governor of Massachusetts
- Ted Stevens, Theta Rho – United States Senate
- Robert Taft Jr., Phi – United States Senate
- James W. Wadsworth Jr. – United States Senate and United States House of Representatives

=== U.S. House ===
- De Alva S. Alexander – United States House of Representatives
- Thomas L. Ashley – United States House of Representatives
- Nathaniel Banks, Sigma – Speaker of the United States House of Representatives
- Franklin Bartlett, Alpha – United States House of Representatives
- Perry Belmont, Alpha – United States House of Representatives; United States Envoy Extraordinary and Minister Plenipotentiary to Spain
- Andrew Biemiller, Delta Chi – United States House of Representatives
- Nathaniel B. Borden, Alpha – United States House of Representatives, Massachusetts Senate, and Massachusetts House of Representatives
- Elbert S. Brigham – United States House of Representatives
- Melville Bull, Alpha – United States House of Representatives
- Edward Burnett, Alpha – United States House of Representatives
- William A. Chanler, Alpha – United States House of Representatives and New York State Assembly
- Augustus P. Gardner, Alpha – United States House of Representatives and Massachusetts Senate
- Edward D. Hayden, Alpha – United States House of Representatives and Massachusetts House of Representatives
- James Hay – United States House of Representatives, judge of the Court of Claims, Virginia Senate, Virginia House of Delegates
- Ro Khanna, Delta Delta – United States House of Representatives
- Warren I. Lee – United States House of Representatives
- John E. Leonard, Alpha – United States House of Representatives and associate justice of the Louisiana Supreme Court
- Bob Livingston, Tau Lambda – United States House of Representatives
- Gillis William Long – United States House of Representatives
- Nicholas Longworth, Alpha – Speaker of the United States House of Representatives
- Herbert Parsons – United States House of Representatives
- Henry R. Rathbone – United States House of Representatives
- John Simpkins, Alpha – United States House of Representatives
- Charles F. Sprague, Alpha – United States House of Representatives, Massachusetts Senate, Massachusetts House of Representatives
- Edwin F. Sweet – United States House of Representatives; Mayor of Grand Rapids, Michigan
- Thomas Chandler Thacher, Alpha – United States House of Representatives
- Robert Walker Tayler – United States House of Representatives; judge of the United States District Court for the Northern District of Ohio
- Charles W. Upham, Alpha – United States House of Representatives, Massachusetts House of Representatives, and mayor of Salem, Massachusetts
- Charles G. Washburn, Alpha – United States House of Representatives, Massachusetts Senate, Massachusetts House of Representatives
- Samuel Winslow, Alpha – United States House of Representatives

=== Diplomacy ===
- Larz Anderson, Alpha – United States Ambassador to Japan; United States Minister to Belgium
- Isaac Bell Jr., Alpha – United States Ambassador to the Netherlands; cotton broker and investors in the Commercial Cable Company
- Anson Burlingame – United States Minister to the Qing Empire, United States House of Representatives
- Sutemi Chinda, Psi Phi – Secretary of State of the Empire of Japan
- John Gardner Coolidge, Alpha – United States Minister to Nicaragua
- Donald Ensenat, Phi – United States Ambassador to Brunei; Chief of Protocol of the United States
- Joseph P. Kennedy Sr., Alpha – U.S. Ambassador to the United Kingdom and 1st Chair of the United States Maritime Commission
- Donald S. MacDonald, Alpha Phi – High Commissioner to the United Kingdom; Canadian Minister of Finance
- Charles MacVeagh, Alpha – United States Ambassador to Japan
- Wayne MacVeagh – United States Ambassador to Italy, United States Ambassador to the Ottoman Empire, United States Attorney General
- Clark T. Randt Jr., Phi – United States Ambassador to China
- Ogden Reid, Phi – United States Ambassador to Israel; United States House of Representatives
- Charles H. Sherrill – United States Minister to Argentina, United States Ambassador to Turkey
- Henry J. Taylor – United States Ambassador to Switzerland
- Yung Wing, Phi – Chinese diplomat to the United States. founder of the Chinese Educational Mission
- John D. Washburn, Alpha – Envoy Extraordinary and Minister Plenipotentiary to Switzerland
- John Hay Whitney, Phi – United States Ambassador to the United Kingdom, publisher of the New York Herald Tribune
- Michael M. Wood, Phi – United States Ambassador to Sweden
- Cyrus Woods – United States Ambassador to Japan, United States Ambassador to Spain, United States Envoy to Portugal, Attorney General of Pennsylvania, Secretary of the Commonwealth of Pennsylvania, Pennsylvania Senate

=== Governors ===
- Percival P. Baxter – Governor of Maine, President of the Maine Senate, Maine House of Representatives
- Franklin S. Billings, Alpha – Governor of Vermont, Lieutenant Governor of Vermont, and Speaker of the Vermont House of Representatives
- Owen Brewster – Governor of Maine, United States Senate, United States House of Representatives
- Gaston Caperton, Beta – Governor of West Virginia
- John Chafee, Phi – Governor of Rhode Island, United States Senate, United States Secretary of the Navy
- Mark Dayton, Phi – Governor of Minnesota, United States Senate
- Ron DeSantis, Phi – Governor of Florida
- John C. B. Ehringhaus – Governor of North Carolina, North Carolina House of Representatives
- Mike Foster, Zeta Zeta – Governor of Louisiana
- Charles Harwood – Governor of the United States Virgin Islands
- Henry W. Keyes, Alpha – Governor of New Hampshire, United States Senate, New Hampshire Senate, New Hampshire House of Representatives
- Tony Knowles, Phi – Governor of Alaska
- Everett J. Lake – Governor of Connecticut
- John Davis Long – Governor of Massachusetts, United States Secretary of the Navy, United States House of Representatives
- Richard Irvine Manning III – Governor of South Carolina
- Robert D. Orr, Phi – Governor of Indiana, United States Ambassador to Singapore
- George Pataki, Phi – Governor of New York
- Samuel E. Pingree – Governor of Vermont
- Regis Henri Post, Alpha – Governor of Puerto Rico and member of the New York State Assembly
- Winthrop Rockefeller – Governor of Arkansas
- Theodore Roosevelt Jr., Alpha – Governor-General of the Philippines, Governor of Puerto Rico, Assistant Secretary of the Navy, and New York State Assembly
- William E. Russell, Alpha – Governor of Massachusetts
- Don Siegelman, Psi – Governor of Alabama

=== State ===
- W. C. Adams – Mississippi State Senate, Mississippi House of Representatives
- Frederick Lothrop Ames, Alpha – Massachusetts Senate
- William Bancroft, Alpha – Massachusetts House of Representatives and Mayor of Cambridge, Massachusetts
- Henry Alfred Bishop – Connecticut House of Representatives
- John Sergeant Cram, Alpha – president of the New York Public Service Commission; President of the Dock Board
- George Cromwell – New York State Senate, New York State Assembly, 1st Borough President of Staten Island
- Grafton D. Cushing, Alpha – Lieutenant Governor of Massachusetts and speaker of the Massachusetts House of Representatives
- Israel T. Deyo – New York State Assembly
- Martin W. Deyo – New York State Senate, New York State Assembly
- Frank S. Farley – president of the New Jersey Senate, New Jersey General Assembly
- Dexter M. Ferry Jr. – Michigan State House of Representatives, president of the Michigan State Board of Education, president of D.M. Ferry & Co.
- Keith Falconer Fletcher, Tau – Massachusetts House of Representatives
- Thomas Gardner Ford – Michigan House of Representatives
- George H. Forster, Alpha – New York State Assembly and New York State Senate
- B. V. Hain – Alabama House of Representatives
- Oliver Gould Jennings – Connecticut House of Representatives
- Oscar G. Johnston – Mississippi House of Representatives
- D. W. Philbrick – speaker of the Maine House of Representatives
- James A. Roberts – Comptroller of New York, New York State Assembly
- Adolph J. Rodenbeck – New York State Assembly
- Peter F. Schabarum, Theta Zeta – California State Assembly, Los Angeles County Board of Supervisors, professional football player
- George S. Weed, Alpha – New York State Assembly

=== Local ===
- Frederick Hobbes Allen, Alpha – Mayor of Pelham Manor, New York; member of the Democratic National Finance Committee; member of Woodrow Wilson's Peace Commission
- Beverly L. Hodghead – mayor of Berkeley, California
- Archibald M. Howe, Alpha – member of the Common Council in Cambridge, Massachusetts; private secretary to congressman Henry Lillie Pierce; National Party vice-presidential candidate

=== Other ===
- Charles Sumner Bird, Alpha – Progressive Party's candidate in the 1912 and 1913 Massachusetts gubernatorial elections
- George A. Drew, Alpha Phi – Premier of Ontario, leader of the Progressive Conservative Party of Canada
- Prince Friso of Orange-Nassau, Theta Zeta – member of the Dutch Royal Family
- F. Norton Goddard, Alpha – political activist, founder of the Civic Club and the Anti-Policy Society
- Thomas Nelson Perkins, Alpha – member of the Paris Peace Conference and the Allied Reparations Committee

== Religion ==
- Robert Codman, Alpha – Bishop of the Episcopal Diocese of Maine
- Samuel A. Eliot, Alpha – Unitarian minister and secretary of the American Unitarian Association
- Lucien Lee Kinsolving – Bishop of the Anglican Episcopal Church of Brazil
- William Lawrence – Bishop of the Episcopal Diocese of Massachusetts
- Francis Greenwood Peabody, Alpha – Unitarian minister and theology professor at Harvard University
- John Timothy Stone – Presbyterian clergyman
- Boyd Vincent – Bishop of the Episcopal Diocese of Southern Ohio

== Science and engineering ==
- Outram Bangs, Alpha – zoologist and urator of mammals at the Museum of Comparative Zoology
- Alan Bean, Omega Chi – Apollo astronaut, fourth man on the moon
- Charles F. Brush – engineer and electrical inventor
- Walter Deane, Alpha – botanist, ornithologist, and curator of William Brewster's ornithological museum
- Charles Alton Ellis, Gamma Phi – engineer who designed the Golden Gate Bridge
- Lucius Lee Hubbard, Alpha – State Geologist of Michigan
- Percival Lowell, Alpha – mathematician and astronomer who founded the Lowell Observatory
- Clarence Bloomfield Moore, Alpha – archaeologist
- John Thayer, Alpha – amateur ornithologist
- Jeme Tien Yow, Phi – chief engineer responsible for the construction of the Peking-Kalgan Railway

== Sports ==
=== Baseball ===
- Bill Annan, Alpha – professional baseball player and umpire
- William Bartholomay, Delta Epsilon – former owner of the Atlanta Braves
- Clinton W. Blume, Mu – pitcher New York Giants in the 1922 World Series; president of the Real Estate Board of New York
- A. Bartlett Giamatti, Phi – commissioner of Major League Baseball
- George Steinbrenner, Epsilon – owner of the New York Yankees
- Fred Thayer, Alpha – baseball manager who invented the catcher's mask

=== Basketball ===
- Hank Luisetti, Sigma Rho – college basketball
- Bob Pettit, Zeta Zeta – NBA All star and hall of famer

=== Football ===
- George C. Adams, Alpha – head coach of the Harvard University football program
- Frankie Albert, Sigma Rho – football player, coach of the San Francisco 49ers
- Dana X. Bible, Iota – head football coach at University of Texas, University of Nebraska, Texas A&M, Louisiana State and Mississippi College
- Paul Brown, Kappa – football coach, founder of the Cleveland Browns, and owner of the Cincinnati Bengals
- Walter Camp, Phi – college football player, coach, and sportswriter known as the "Father of American Football"
- Hugh Culverhouse, Psi – owner of Tampa Bay Buccaneers
- Arthur Cumnock, Alpha – college football player selected for the first All-America team in 1889
- Michael Eben, Alpha Phi – former Toronto Argonauts player
- Calvin Hill, Phi – professional football player for the Dallas Cowboys, the Washington Redskins, and the Cleveland Browns
- Larry Kelley, Phi – 1936 Heisman Trophy winner
- Thomas W. Landry, Omega Chi – coach of the Dallas Cowboys
- James P. Lee, Alpha – college football player on the 1889 All-America college football team
- Gerrit Smith Miller, Alpha – founder of Oneida Football Club, known as "the father of football in the United States"; member of the New York State Assembly
- Marshall Newell, Alpha – college football player and coach
- Joe Paterno, Upsilon – Pennsylvania State University football coach
- J. Burton Rix, Pi – football and basketball coach at the University of Texas, Southern Methodist University, and the University of Miami
- Matt Stover, Alpha Omega – placekicker in the National Football League
- Belford West, Mu – inductee of the College Football Hall of Fame
- Wheelock Whitney Jr., Phi – owner of the Minnesota Vikings and Minnesota Twins

=== Hockey ===
- Mike Babcock, Tau Alpha – head coach of the Edmonton Oilers; only coach in the Triple Gold Club
- Bill Zito, Psi – general manager of the Florida Panthers, two time Stanley Cup champion

=== Olympians ===
- Sebastian Bea, Theta Zeta – 2000 Summer Olympics silver medalist in crew
- James Elder, Alpha Phi – 1968 Summer Olympics gold medalist, men's equestrian team
- Foxhall P. Keene, Alpha – gold medalist in Polo at the 1900 Summer Olympics; semifinalist at the 1883 U.S. National Championships for tennis
- Bill Miller, Sigma Rho – 1936 Summer Olympics gold medalist in pole vault
- Sumner Paine, Alpha – shooter who won a gold and silver medal in the 1896 Summer Olympics
- James Stillman Rockefeller, Phi – 1924 Summer Olympics gold medalist in crew
- Don Schollander, Phi – 1964 Summer Olympics four-time gold medalist in swimming
- Charles Snelling, Alpha Phi – figure skater, competed at the 1956 Winter Olympics and 1964 Winter Olympics
- Jack Torrance, Zeta Zeta – held the world record in shot put for fourteen years, competed at the 1936 Summer Olympics
- Pat Turner – 1984 Summer Olympics gold medalist in crew
- Richard Weinberger, Beta Tau – 2012 Summer Olympics bronze medalist in swimming (10 km Marathon)

=== Polo ===
- Raymond Rodgers Belmont, Alpha – polo player
- Seward Cary, Alpha – polo player
- John Elliot Cowdin, Alpha – polo player

=== Sailing ===
- Francis Boardman Crowninshield, Alpha – yachtsman
- Woodbury Kane, Alpha – yachtsman; served on the Columbia in the 1899 America's Cup race
- Herbert M. Sears, Alpha – yachtsman, commodore of the Eastern Yacht Club, owner of Constellation

=== Tennis ===
- Joshua Crane, Alpha – four time U.S. court tennis champion; played in the finals of the 1904 U.S. Open Polo Championship
- Robert J. Kelleher, Epsilon – Hall of Fame tennis player and official
- Don McNeill, Lambda – four time Grand Slam winner in tennis
- Richard Sears, Alpha – tennis player, seven-time winner of the US National Championships singles
- Quincy Shaw, Alpha – tennis player, winner of the NCAA Men's Tennis Championships in 1887 and 1890
- Howard Taylor, Alpha – tennis player, NCAA singles and doubles champion in 1883, winner of the 1889 U.S. National Championships men's doubles
- Walter Van Rensselaer Berry, Alpha – tennis player and judge at the International Mixed Tribunal of Cairo, Egypt

=== Other sports ===
- Jack Agrios, Delta Phi – chairman of the IAAF World Championships
- August Belmont Jr., Alpha – first president of the Jockey Club, builder of Belmont Park racetrack, and breeder of Man o' War
- Craig Hummer, Lambda – International Iron Man champion (lifeguarding), sportscaster
- George B. Morison, Alpha – sportsman, president of the Boston Athletic Association
- Dicky Pride, Psi – professional golfer on the PGA Tour
