= Conspirateurs =

Board game

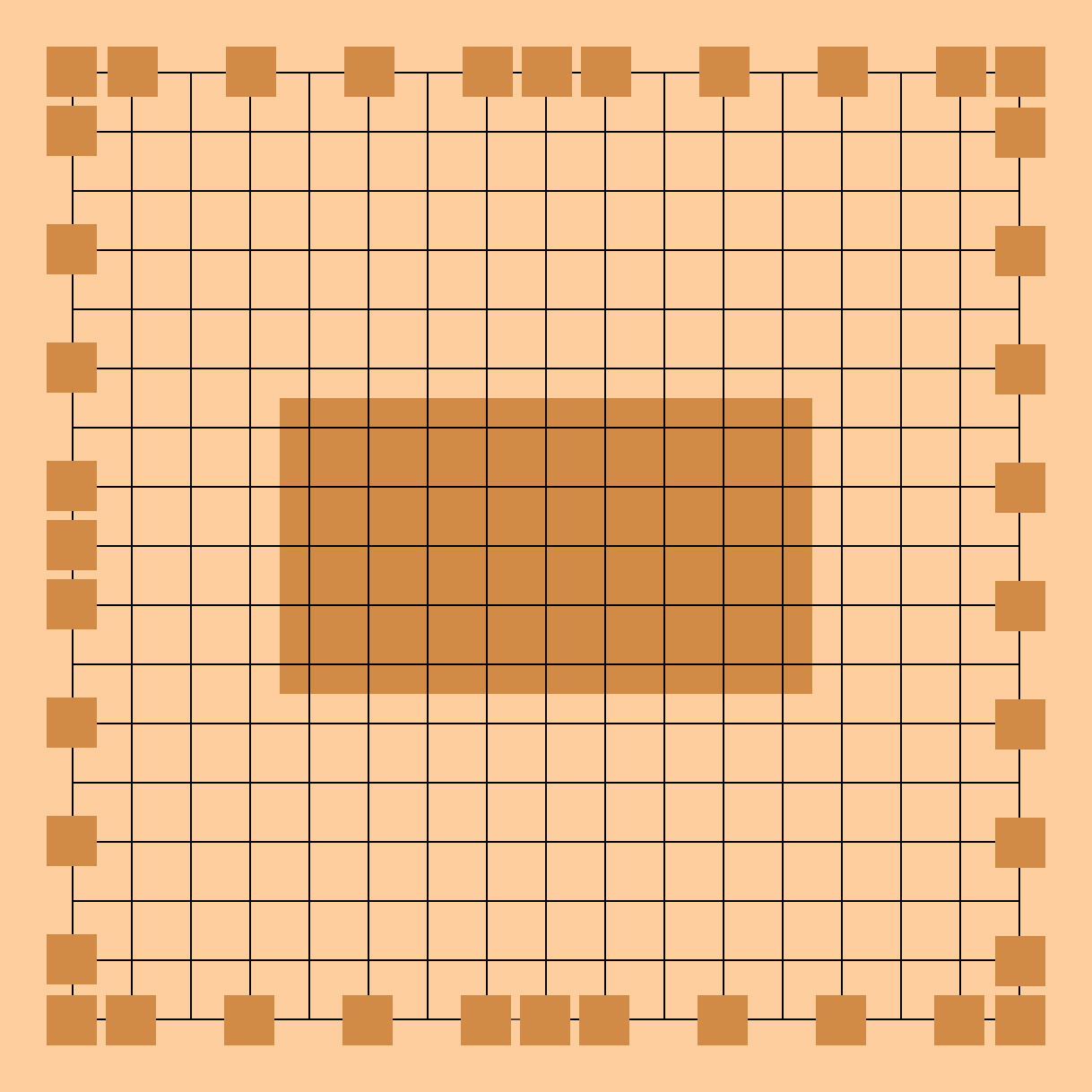
Conspirateurs starts on an empty board with a centre "secret meeting place" and 39 perimeter sanctuaries.

Conspirateurs (lit. 'Conspirators') is a two- or four-player strategy board game said to have been invented in 18th-century France. Robert Charles Bell believes the game to date from after 1789, following the French Revolutionary Wars, "a period of feverish political activity with factions conspiring against each other".

Conspirateurs resembles other games such as Halma, Ugolki, Chinese Checkers, and Salta in that pieces jump without capturing over friendly or enemy pieces, to move more quickly to their destinations.

== Equipment ==
The gameboard consists of 17×17 gridded lines. At the centre is a specially marked or coloured area made up of 5×9 intersection points representing a "secret meeting place". On the board's perimeter, 39 points are specially marked or coloured to identify sanctuaries.

The game pieces (men) are always placed on the points, using either marbles or pegs in holes, or flat-bottom pieces. In two-player games, each side has 20 men; in four-player games, each side has 10 men. The sets of men are distinctively coloured.

== Rules ==
Play begins with an empty board. Players choose colour, with Black having the first turn. Players alternate turns. The game proceeds in two phases:

1. Drop phase. Players place one man per turn on any vacant point on the special 5×9 centre area of the board. Players may not move a man until all their men have been placed.
2. Move phase. Players move one man per turn to a vacant point one step in any direction orthogonally or diagonally. Or players may leap over an adjacent man (friend or foe) and land on the vacant point immediately beyond. Multiple leaps are allowed in a single turn: a man may continue to leap in any direction as long as there are jumps to be made, and may stop jumping at any point (leaps are not compulsory). A jumped man is not captured (there is no capturing in Conspirateurs).

After the drop phase is completed, one of the players shouts a warning that they have been discovered, and the conspirateurs scatter to hide in sanctuaries. A sanctuary may hold at most one man. The first to bring all his men to sanctuary wins the game.
