= Salta (game) =

Two-player abstract strategy board game

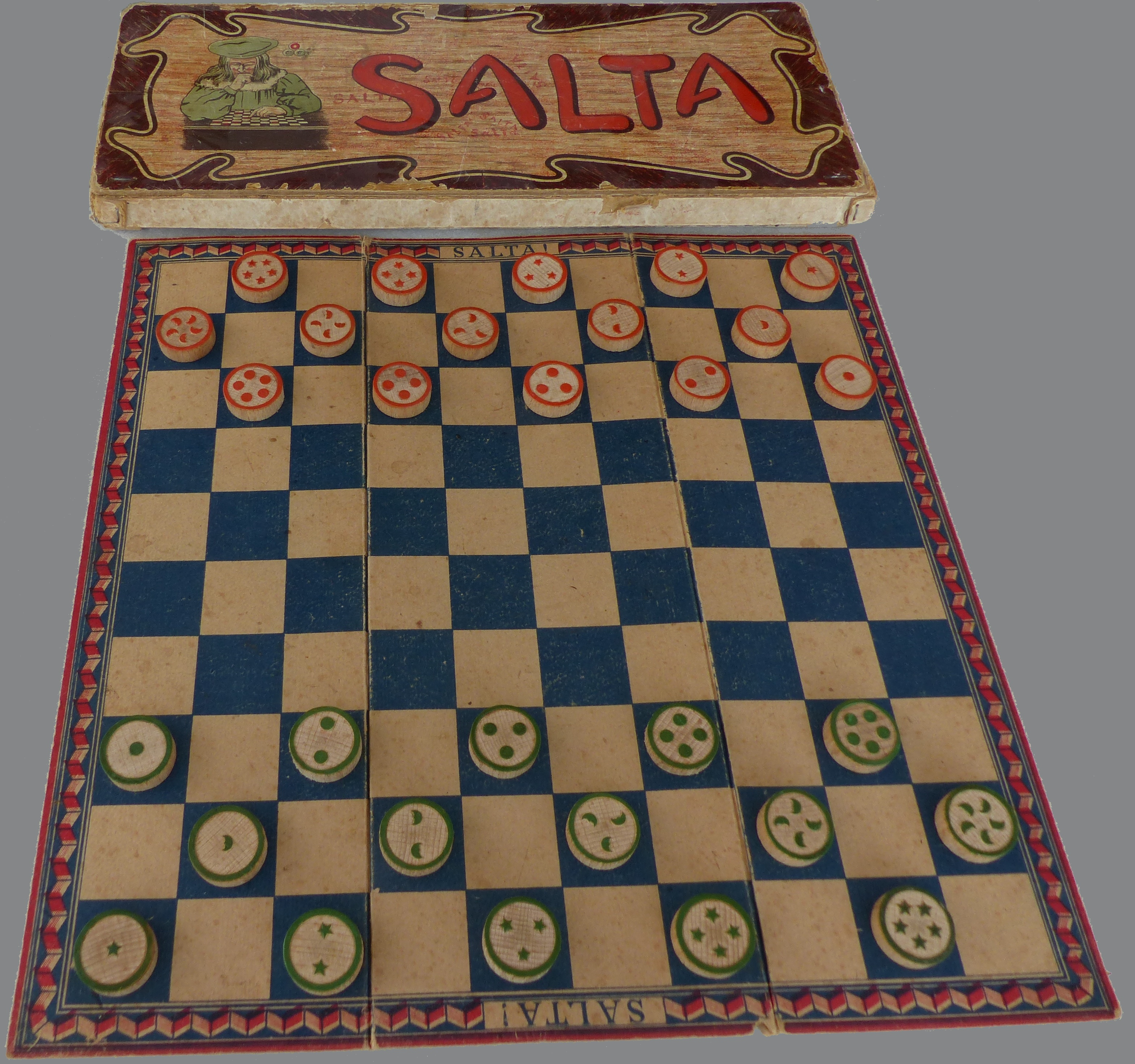
Antique Salta board and playing pieces

Salta is two-player abstract strategy board game invented by Konrad Heinrich Büttgenbach in 1899 in Germany. Büttgenbach (1870–1939) was born in Heerdt, near Düsseldorf, Germany. The game attained its highest popularity in the early 1900s before World War I especially in France and Germany. The World Trade Fair of 1900 in Paris exhibited a Salta board made of mahogany with golden counters adorned with more than 5,000 diamonds. Famous players were the US chess master Frank Marshall, the German World Chess Champion Emanuel Lasker, and the French actress Sarah Bernhardt (the "Divine").

Salta means "jump" in Italian or Latin. The game is related to Halma, Chinese Checkers, and Conspirateurs. Players attempt to jump over pieces without capturing them, and be first to advance their pieces to the other player's side. Salta is played on a Continental Checker board with 10x10 chequered squares. One player has green markings on white pieces, and the other player has red markings on black pieces.

Salta should not be confused with El Asalto or The Assault or Salto which is a member of the Fox games.

== Goal ==
The player that can first bring each of their pieces seven rows forward is the winner. The pieces must retain their original order in each row.

== Equipment ==
Starting positions

A 10x10 chequered square board is used as in a Continental Checker board. Each player has 15 pieces that are initially lined up on the dark squares of the first three ranks of each player's side. The five pieces on the first rank are called stars, and are marked with one to five stars in ascending order from left to right. The five pieces on the second rank are called moons, and are marked with one to five moons in ascending order from left to right. The five pieces on the third rank are called suns, and are marked with one to five suns in ascending order from left to right. An alternative marking system is to simply number the stars 1 to 5 from left to right, number the moons 6 to 10 from left to right, and number the suns 11 to 15 from left to right. One player has the white pieces with the green markings, and the other player has the black pieces with the red markings. Pieces are only played on the black squares.

== Rules and gameplay ==
1. Players decide who will play green or red, and who will start first. Green moves first.
2. Pieces are initially placed on the first three ranks as described under the Equipment section.
3. Pieces are played only on the black squares.
4. Players alternate turns. Only one piece may be moved per turn. A piece can move diagonally forward or backward.
5. Alternatively, a piece can diagonally jump over an adjacent enemy piece forward, and land on an unoccupied square on the other side. Only one piece may be jumped. The jumped piece is not captured as in draughts.
6. Jumps are compulsory.
7. If a player does not jump when presented with the opportunity, the other player calls "Salta", and the player must take back their last move, and jump before play continues.
8. A player cannot block the other player's pieces in such a way to prevent the other player from performing a legal move. Each player must always have the ability to perform a legal move.
9. An optional rule is called the 120-move rule. After 120 moves by each player, the game ends. Then each player calculates the minimum number of moves needed to accomplish their goal. This is accomplished by totaling the number of minimum moves needed for each piece not yet in its destined position. Friendly and enemy pieces are ignored on the path of a piece when calculating the minimum number of moves needed to reach its destination. The player with the least number is the winner. Since Green moves first, 1 point is added to the total number of Red's moves if Green finishes first.

== Variants ==
Pyramid closely resembles Salta, and it was described next to it by R.C. Bell in Board and Tables Games from Many Civilizations (1969). It is a game played on an 8 x 8 checkered board (with the double black squares on the lower right corner). Checker (draught) pieces may be used. Each player has 10 pieces and are initially positioned on their side of the board in such way to form a triangle or pyramid, hence its name. The pieces are placed on the black squares. On the first row there are four pieces thus occupying all available black squares on the first row. On the second row, three pieces are placed on the black squares which lie above and between the four black squares of the first row. This pattern continues for the third row with two pieces, and finally the fourth row with one piece. On a player's turn, a piece may move diagonally forward onto a vacant black square (pieces may never move backwards). Alternatively, a piece may leap over an adjacent opposing piece using the short leap method as in checkers (and as in Salta), and continue to leap opposing pieces within the same turn if available. No pieces are ever captured or removed throughout the game as in Salta. Bell does not specify if leaps are mandatory, or if backward leaps are allowed. The objective of the game is to be the first to occupy the exact same squares of the initial position of the opposing player's pieces similarly as in Salta. Bell unfortunately does not provide any historical information on the game.

== See also ==
- Halma
- Chinese Checkers
- Conspirateurs
