= Everett Chamberlin Benton =

American politician

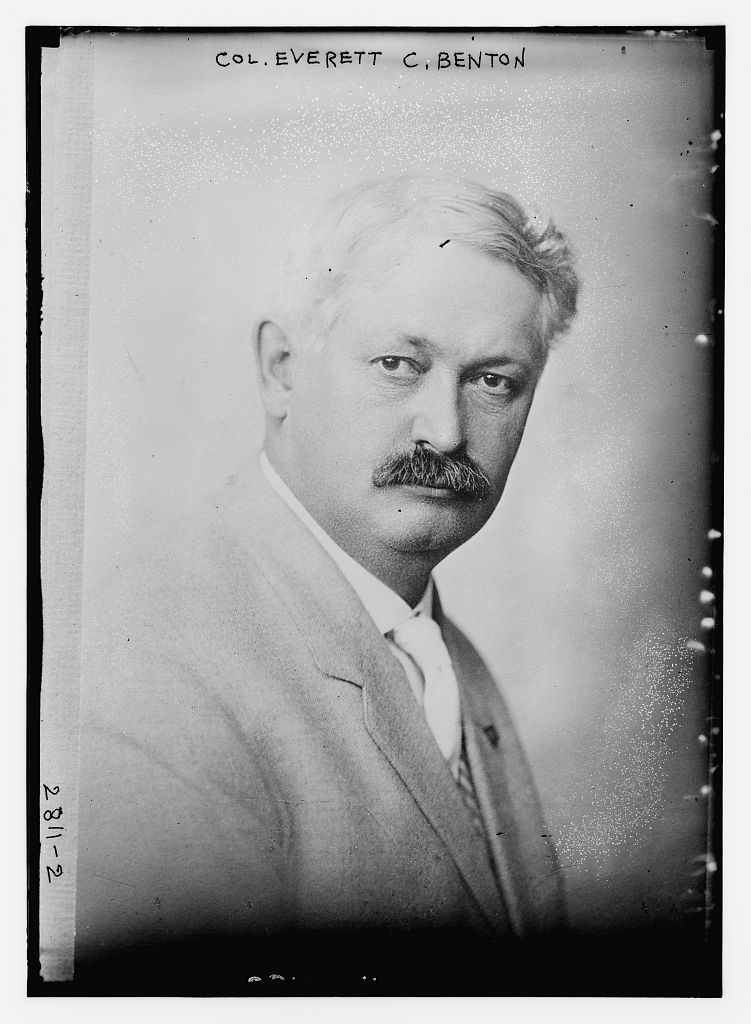

Member of the Massachusetts Governor's Council
- In office 1899–1901

Personal details
- Born: September 25, 1862 Guildhall, Vermont, U.S.
- Died: February 4, 1924 (aged 61) Boston, Massachusetts, U.S.
- Children: 6, including Jay R. Benton

Everett Chamberlin Benton (September 25, 1862 – February 4, 1924) was an American insurance businessman and politician who was a leading insurance businessman and an active member of the Massachusetts Republican Party.

== Early life ==
Benton was born in Guildhall, Vermont, to Adda Chamberlin and Judge Charles E. Benton. He attended public school in Guildhall and at the age of 14 became a page in the Vermont Senate. When he was 16 he went to work for a local paper, The Essex County Herald. He also spent two years as a clerk to the Secretary of State of Vermont and was deputy county clerk for Essex County, Vermont.

== Business career ==
In 1882, Benton moved to Boston, where he found work in the office of insurance broker John C. Paige. When Paige died, Benton became a partner of the business, which changed its name to John C. Paige & Co. He also organized the Massachusetts Fire and Marine Insurance Company.

== Politics ==
Benton served on the Massachusetts State Republican Committee and was a member of Governor Frederic T. Greenhalge's staff. From 1899 to 1901 he was a member of the Massachusetts Governor's Council. He was a delegate to the 1896, 1900, and 1904 Republican National Conventions. He was appointed to the Metropolitan Park Commission by Curtis Guild Jr. and advocated for increased public access to the parks. He was an unsuccessful candidate for the Republican nomination in the 1912 and 1913 Massachusetts gubernatorial elections.

== Freemasonry ==
In 1895, Benton was raised a Master Mason in 1895 in Simon W. Robinson Lodge at Lexington. That same year he received the degrees of the Ancient and Accepted Scottish Rite and became a member of Massachusetts Consistory. He became a member of Waltham Royal Arch Chapter in 1896, the Boston Council of Royal and Select Masters in 1901, Benton Lodge of Guildhall, Vermont in 1901, and the St. Bernard Coinmandery in 1902. In 1902 he was crowned an Honorary Member of the Supreme Council 33rd and was the first chairman of the class. He received the Red Cross of Constantine in 1904. From 1904 to 1905 he presided over Boston Council of R. and S. Masters. Under his leadership the group gained 208 new members. In 1905 he was elected Chief Rabban of the Aleppo Temple of the Mystic Shrine. In 1905 he was elected Grand Principal Conductor of the Work and Deputy Grand Master of the Grand Lodge of Massachusetts. From 1905 to 1906 was M. I. Grand Sovereign of the Imperial Council of Vermont of the Knights of the Red Cross of Constantine. In 1906 he was unanimously elected Commander in Chief of the Massachusetts Consistory. From 1912 to 1913 he was Grand Master of the Grand Lodge of Massachusetts.

== Personal life ==
In 1885, Benton married Willene Rogers of Cambridge, Massachusetts. They resided at the former John Perkins Cushing estate in Belmont, Massachusetts. They had six children, one of whom, Jay R. Benton, served as Massachusetts Attorney General. Benton fell severely ill with pneumonia in 1917 and remained in poor health until his death on February 4, 1924.

== Legacy ==
In 1901, Benton donated a combined library and Masonic lodge to his native town of Guildhall. In 1930, the Benton family donated a chapel on their former estate to the town of Belmont for use as a library. It was named the Everett C. Benton Library in Benton's honor.
