= Basilinda =

Board game

- Basilinda board game
- Manufacturers: E.I. Horsman
- Designers: George Howard Monks
- Publication: 1890; 136 years ago
- Genres: Board game
- Players: 2
- Skills: Strategy, tactics

Basilinda is a board game that was created by George Howard Monks, the author of Halma. Basilinda was first published and manufactured in 1890, by E.I. Horsman, a toy manufacturer from New York. The game originally sold for $1.00 when it was released.

== Game equipment ==
The game consists of a board, a movable partition and movable pieces. Each player has eighteen men, three cannons, and one captain or king. The game board is divided into two parts by the movable partition that is placed across the middle of the board. On each side of the partition, the board is divided into nine spaces, each of which corresponds to a similar space on the other side. The game is played by two people; although three or four may participate.

== Game play ==
The game board is placed on a table with the partition in the middle. Players sit on opposite sides of the table, so neither player can see their opponent's side. Each player then arranges six of their men and three cannons in the spaces that belong to them. The individual cannons must occupy a space alone and be pointed towards the partition. The six men are arranged in the spaces not occupied by the cannons. The men may all be placed in one space or distributed accordingly. A signal is given when "all is ready", and the partition is removed. Any men that are found to be in positions that are opposite of the cannons are now considered dead and removed from the board. If the number of men in any one space are less than the number in the opposite space, then those are also declared dead and removed. A cannon opposed to a cannon results in the pieces remaining where they are. Likewise, if the number of men in one space is the same as those in the opposite space, the pieces remain.

Cannons are never removed from the board. After all the dead men have been removed, the partition is again placed on the game board and the process is repeated. Players must always have six men in play, and at the end of each battle, they replace the men who have been eliminated by their opponent, until all of their men are dead. The number of men on the board on each side never exceeds six, but when a player has less than six, he must use all that they have left. When either player loses all their men, they are obligated to use their captain in the men's place. The captain always occupies a space by himself. When the partition is removed, and the captain has been placed opposite the other player's cannon, he is considered dead and the game has been won by the player with the cannon. However, if the captain is not eliminated by the other player's cannon, then he can kill those men who are opposed to him, and gameplay continues until one of the player's captains is killed.

== See also ==
- History of games
- List of board games
- Mind sport
