= 1912 Massachusetts gubernatorial election =

- November 5, 1912
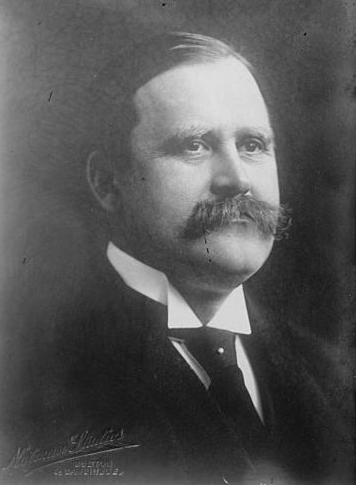

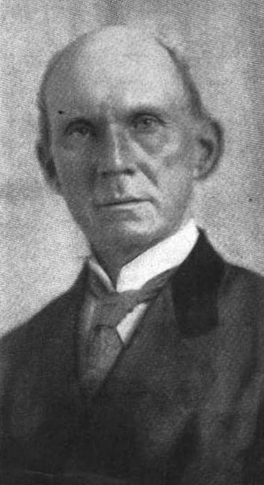
Nominee	Eugene Foss	Joseph H. Walker	Charles Sumner Bird
Party	Democratic	Republican	Progressive
Popular vote	193,184	143,597	126,102
Percentage	40.31%	29.96%	26.31%
- Foss: 20–30% 30–40% 40–50% 50–60% 60–70% Walker: 30–40% 40–50% 50–60% 60–70% 70–80% 80–90% >90% Bird: 30–40% 40–50% 50–60% 60–70%
Governor before election
Eugene Foss
Democratic
Elected Governor
Eugene Foss
Democratic

The 1912 Massachusetts gubernatorial election took place on November 5, 1912. Democratic Governor Eugene Foss defeated the Republican candidate Joseph H. Walker and Progressive candidate Charles S. Bird.

== Democratic primary ==
=== Candidates ===
- Eugene Foss, incumbent governor
- Joseph C. Pelletier, district attorney of Suffolk County

=== Results ===
1912 Massachusetts Democratic gubernatorial primary
Party	Candidate	Votes	%
Democratic	Eugene Foss	58,878	63.26%
Democratic	Joseph C. Pelletier	34,194	36.73%
Total votes		93,072	100.00%

== Republican primary ==
=== Candidates ===
- Everett Chamberlin Benton, businessman and former member of the Massachusetts Governor's Council
- Joseph H. Walker, former speaker of the Massachusetts House of Representatives

=== Results ===
1912 Massachusetts Republican gubernatorial primary
Party	Candidate	Votes	%
Republican	Joseph H. Walker	48,568	55.58%
Republican	Everett Chamberlin Benton	38,804	44.41%
Total votes		87,372	100.00%

== General election ==
=== Candidates ===
- Charles Sumner Bird, paper manufacturer (Progressive)
- Alfred H. Evans (Prohibition)
- Eugene Foss, incumbent governor (Democratic)
- Arthur Elmer Reimer, 1912 nominee for president of the United States (Socialist Labor)
- Roland D. Sawyer, Congregationalist pastor (Socialist)
- Joseph H. Walker, former speaker of the Massachusetts House of Representatives (Republican)

=== Results ===
1912 Massachusetts gubernatorial election
Party	Candidate	Votes	%	±%
Democratic	Eugene Foss (incumbent)	193,184	40.31%	
Republican	Joseph H. Walker	143,597	29.96%	
Progressive	Charles Sumner Bird	126,102	26.31%	
Socialist	Roland D. Sawyer	11,493	2.42%	
Prohibition	Alfred H. Evans	2,702	0.57%	
Socialist Labor	Arthur Elmer Reimer	2,212	0.47%	
Total votes		475,792	100.00%	

== See also ==
- 1912 Massachusetts legislature
