= George Howard Monks =

American surgeon and board game inventor (1853–1933)

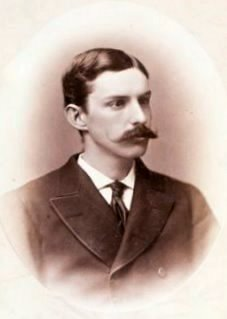
- Monks, c. 1875
- Born: 28 March 1853; Boston, Massachusetts, United States
- Died: 6 January 1933 (aged 79)
- Occupation: Surgeon

George Howard Monks (1853–1933) was an American surgeon and board game inventor.

Monks was born in Boston, Massachusetts and graduated from Harvard Medical School in 1880. Subsequently, he followed a 4-year internship in European medical centers during which he invented in 1883 the game Halma (ancient Greek for “jump”) derived from the British game Hoppity together with the mathematician Thomas Hill. Halma was derived Chinese checkers and had great commercial success in the following years. He also invented a game called Basilinda.

Monks began the practice of surgery in Boston in 1884 as he was appointed district physician of the Boston Dispensary and, later, visiting surgeon to the Carney Hospital. In 1890, he entered the Boston City Hospital and was promoted through various grades to surgeon-in-chief in 1910. From 1886 to 1926 Monks was connected with the Harvard Medical School (Department of Surgical Anatomy) but more importantly with Harvard Dental School where he was appointed Professor of Oral Surgery.
