= Bill Annan =

American baseball umpire and lawyer

- Born: William Howard Annan; December 14, 1850; Louisville, Kentucky, U.S.
- Disappeared: 1898
- Died: Unknown
- Occupation: Umpire
- Years active: 1873

William Howard Annan (December 14, 1850 – unknown) was an American professional baseball umpire. Annan umpired one National Association game in 1873, between the Brooklyn Atlantics and the Boston Red Stockings (today's Atlanta Braves).

Annan was also a minor league shortstop, played for Harvard University, and earned a law degree there. He was a lawyer in Baltimore from 1880 to 1885, studied at the University of Edinburgh, then moved to London and later New York City. He disappeared in 1898.
