= 1913 Massachusetts gubernatorial election =

- November 4, 1913
- Turnout: 13.61% ▼0.64
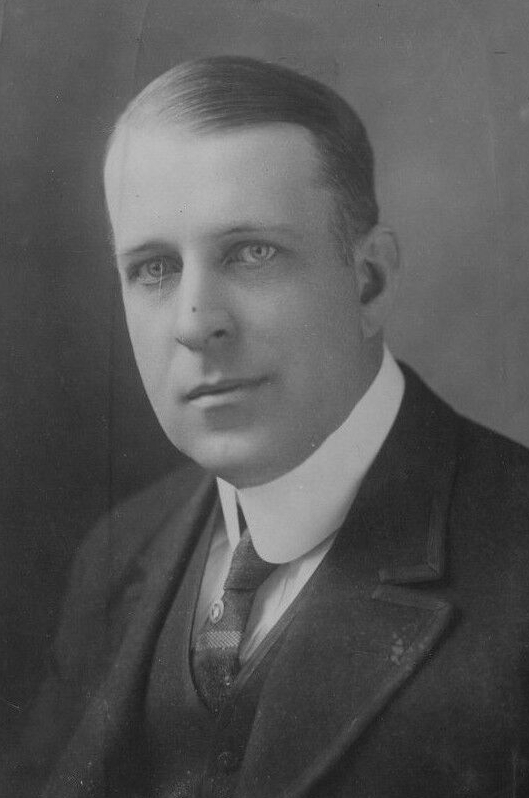

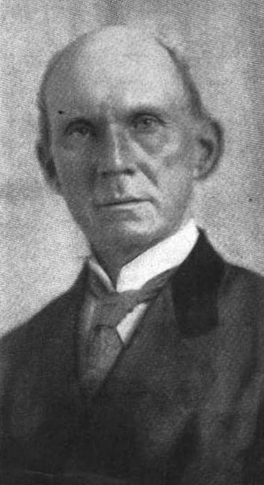

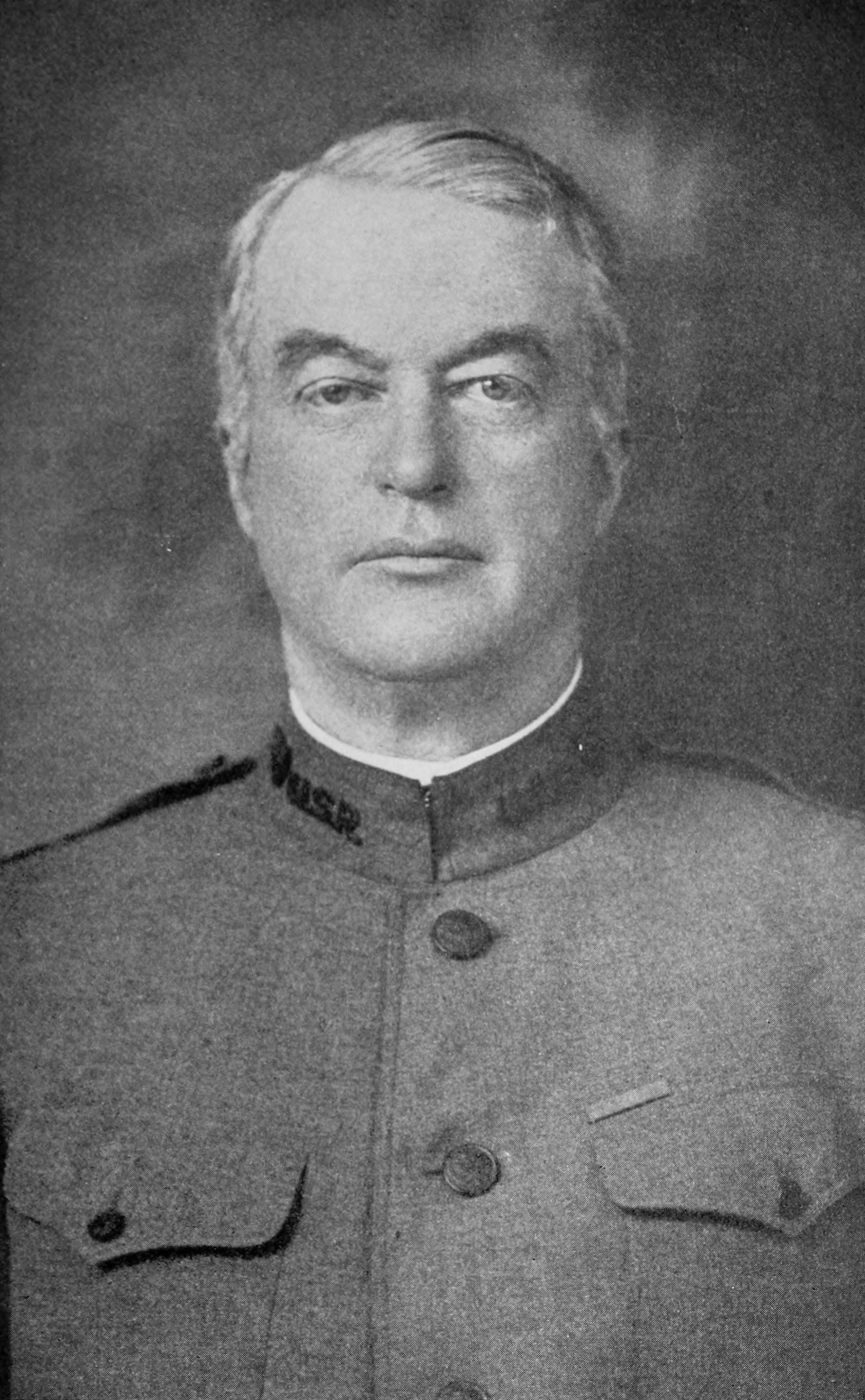
| Nominee | David I. Walsh | Charles Sumner Bird | Augustus Peabody Gardner |
| Party | Democratic | Progressive | Republican |
| Popular vote | 183,267 | 127,755 | 116,705 |
| Percentage | 39.77% | 27.72% | 25.32% |
- Walsh: 30–40% 40–50% 50–60% 60–70% 70–80% Bird: 30–40% 40–50% 50–60% 60–70% 70–80% Gardner: 30–40% 40–50% 50–60% 60–70% 70–80% 80–90% Tied: 20–30% 30–40% 40–50%
Governor before election
Eugene Foss
Democratic
Elected Governor
David I. Walsh
Democratic

The 1913 Massachusetts gubernatorial election took place on November 4, 1913. Democratic Lieutenant Governor David I. Walsh defeated the Progressive, Republican and independent candidates Charles S. Bird, Representative Augustus Peabody Gardner and incumbent Governor Eugene Foss with 39.77% of the vote. Suffolk County was the only county to give more than 50% of its vote to a candidate, giving Walsh 53.98% of its vote.

== Democratic primary ==
=== Candidates ===
- David Walsh, lieutenant governor

==== Withdrew ====
- Eugene Foss, incumbent governor (running as an independent)

=== Results ===
Following Governor Foss's exit from the Democratic Party, Lieutenant Governor Walsh was unopposed for the nomination.

1913 Massachusetts Democratic gubernatorial primary
| Party | Candidate | Votes | % |
|---|---|---|---|
| Democratic | David Walsh | 70,050 | 99.98% |
| Write-in | All others | 17 | 0.02% |
| Total votes | | 70,067 | 100% |

== Republican primary ==
=== Candidates ===
- Everett Chamberlin Benton, candidate for governor in 1912
- Augustus Peabody Gardner, U.S. representative from Hamilton

==== Failed to qualify ====
- Eugene Foss, incumbent governor

=== Results ===
Republican primary results

1913 Massachusetts Republican gubernatorial primary
| Party | Candidate | Votes | % |
|---|---|---|---|
| Republican | Augustus Peabody Gardner | 43,331 | 53.92% |
| Republican | Everett Chamberlin Benton | 36,934 | 45.96% |
| Write-in | All others | 100 | 0.12% |
| Total votes | | 80,365 | 100% |

== Progressive primary ==
=== Candidates ===
- Charles Sumner Bird, proprietor of Bird and Son Paper Company and nominee for governor in 1912

==== Declined ====
- Eugene Foss, incumbent governor (running as an independent)

=== Results ===
Bird was unopposed for the nomination.

1913 Massachusetts Progressive gubernatorial primary
| Party | Candidate | Votes | % |
|---|---|---|---|
| Progressive | Charles Sumner Bird | 7,452 | 99.96% |
| Write-in | All others | 3 | 0.04% |
| Total votes | | 7,455 | 100% |

== General election ==
=== Candidates ===
- Charles Sumner Bird, proprietor of Bird and Son Paper Company and nominee for governor in 1912 (Progressive)
- Alfred H. Evans (Prohibition)
- Eugene Foss, incumbent governor of Massachusetts (Independent)
- Augustus Peabody Gardner, U.S. representative from Hamilton (Republican)
- Arthur Reimer, candidate for president of the United States in 1912 (Socialist Labor)
- David Walsh, lieutenant governor (Democratic)
- George H. Wrenn (Socialist)

=== Results ===
Massachusetts gubernatorial election, 1913
| Party | Candidate | Votes | % | ±% |
|---|---|---|---|---|
| Democratic | David I. Walsh | 183,267 | 39.77% | ▼0.54 |
| Progressive | Charles Sumner Bird | 127,755 | 27.72% | ▲1.42 |
| Republican | Augustus Peabody Gardner | 116,705 | 25.32% | ▼4.64 |
| Independent | Eugene Foss (incumbent) | 20,171 | 4.38% | N/A |
| Socialist | George H. Wrenn | 9,025 | 1.96% | ▼0.46 |
| Prohibition | Alfred H. Evans | 2,015 | 0.44% | ▼0.13 |
| Socialist Labor | Arthur Elmer Reimer | 1,932 | 0.42% | ▼0.05 |
| Total votes | | 345,890 | 100% | |

=== Results by county ===
| County | Walsh | Votes | Bird | Votes | Gardner | Votes | Foss | Votes | Others | Votes |
|---|---|---|---|---|---|---|---|---|---|---|
| Barnstable | 19.09% | 840 | 34.29% | 1,509 | 34.31% | 1,510 | 10.59% | 466 | 1.73% | 76 |
| Berkshire | 37.98% | 5,769 | 25.59% | 3,887 | 27.25% | 4,139 | 4.71% | 715 | 4.48% | 681 |
| Bristol | 34.88% | 12,253 | 25.86% | 9,082 | 30.55% | 10,732 | 5.23% | 1,838 | 3.47% | 1,219 |
| Dukes | 17.02% | 137 | 29.94% | 241 | 40.25% | 324 | 11.93% | 96 | 0.87% | 7 |
| Essex | 32.39% | 20,694 | 24.63% | 15,732 | 36.79% | 23,501 | 2.55% | 1,627 | 3.64% | 2,328 |
| Franklin | 27.45% | 1,799 | 26.85% | 1,760 | 35.20% | 2,307 | 5.77% | 378 | 4.73% | 310 |
| Hampden | 42.32% | 11,828 | 22.63% | 6,325 | 23.40% | 6,540 | 7.22% | 2,018 | 4.43% | 1,237 |
| Hampshire | 36.75% | 3,252 | 17.73% | 1,569 | 32.16% | 2,846 | 8.62% | 763 | 4.73% | 419 |
| Middlesex | 37.66% | 37,376 | 33.02% | 32,773 | 23.17% | 23,985 | 3.49% | 3,461 | 1.66% | 1,652 |
| Nantucket | 27.27% | 147 | 21.34% | 115 | 34.14% | 184 | 14.29% | 77 | 2.97% | 16 |
| Norfolk | 32.77% | 9,325 | 33.57% | 9,552 | 27.29% | 7,765 | 4.25% | 1,208 | 2.13% | 605 |
| Plymouth | 31.39% | 6,978 | 38.57% | 8,609 | 21.05% | 4,679 | 4.41% | 980 | 4.41% | 981 |
| Suffolk | 53.98% | 49,775 | 23.71% | 21,863 | 16.21% | 14,946 | 3.90% | 3,599 | 2.20% | 2,024 |
| Worcester | 41.69% | 23,094 | 26.60% | 14,738 | 23.91% | 13,247 | 5.32% | 2,945 | 2.49% | 1,377 |

== See also ==
- 1913 Massachusetts legislature
