= B. V. Hain =

American politician

Member of the Alabama House of Representatives from the Dallas County district
- In office 1954–1970

Personal details
- Born: Bruce Valentine Hain; September 3, 1915 Selma, Alabama, U.S.
- Died: August 11, 1995 (aged 79) Sardis, Alabama, U.S.
- Spouse: Lila Davenport Anderson
- Children: 1 stepson
- Education: Vanderbilt University, University of Alabama School of Law
- Occupation: lawyer, farmer

Bruce Valentine Hain (September 3, 1915 – August 11, 1995) was an American politician who served as a member of the Alabama House of Representatives from 1954 to 1970, representing Dallas County, Alabama. He lived in Selma, Alabama and was an attorney.
