= Charles Sumner Bird =

American politician (1855–1927)

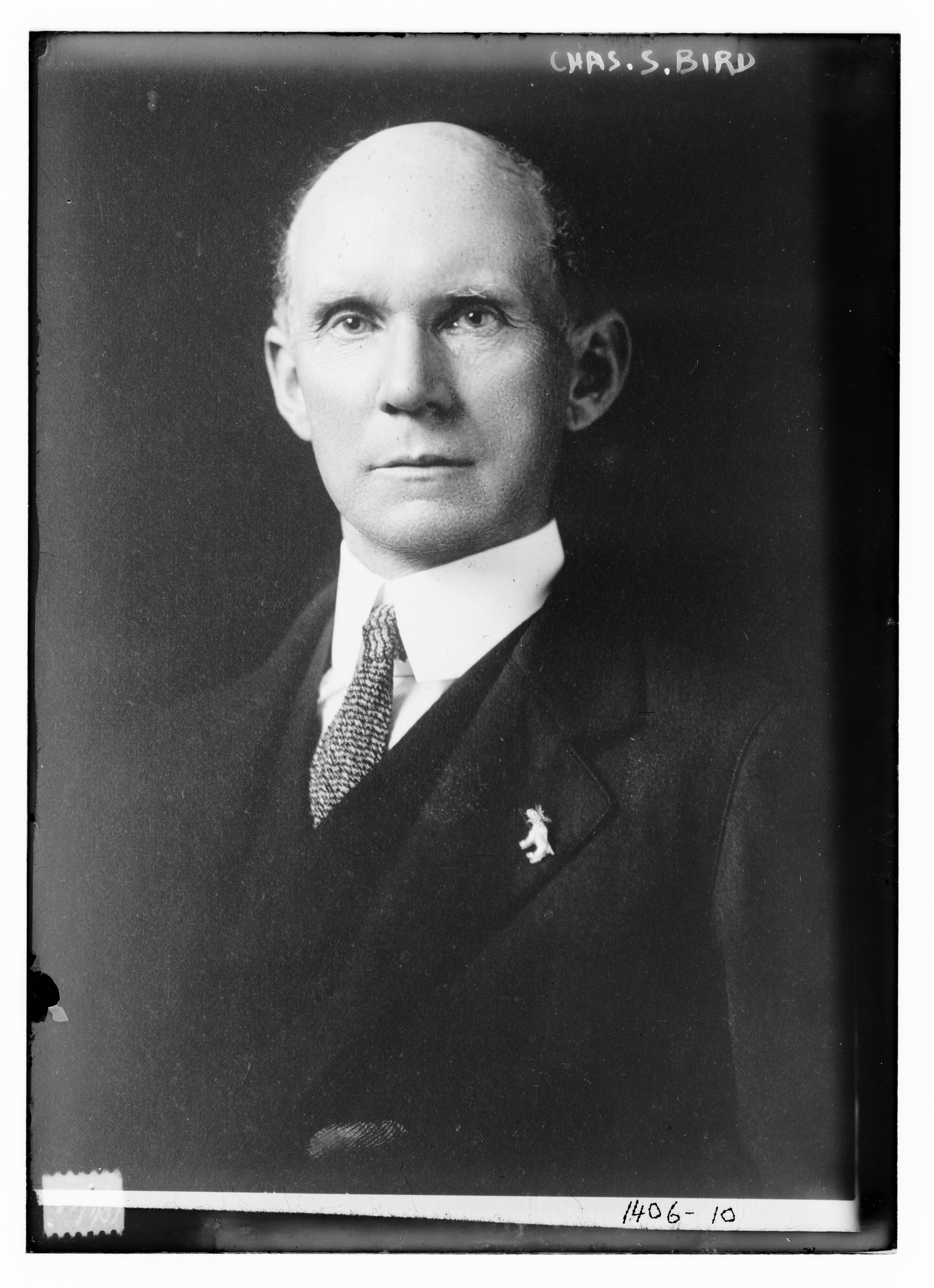
- Bird in 1900

Personal details
- Born: August 15, 1855 Walpole, Massachusetts, U.S.
- Died: October 9, 1927 (aged 72) Walpole, Massachusetts, U.S.
- Party: Republican
- Other political affiliations: Democratic (1884–1896); National Democratic (1896); Progressive (1912–1913)
- Spouse: Anna Julia Child
- Children: 4
- Parents: Francis William Bird (father); Abby Frances (mother)
- Education: Harvard University

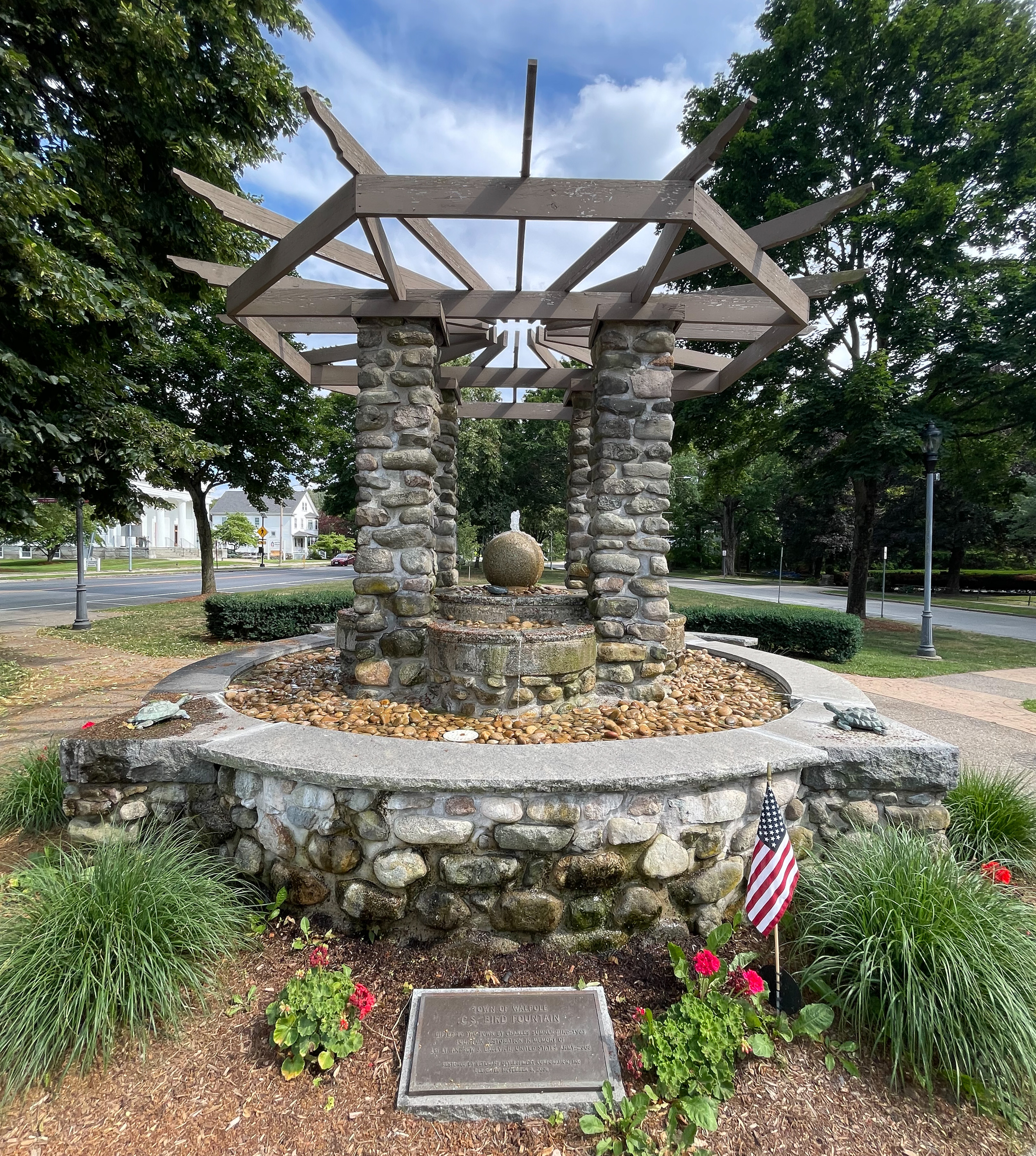
C.S. Bird Fountain on the Walpole town common

Charles Sumner Bird (August 15, 1855 – October 9, 1927) was an American politician from Massachusetts. A progressive Republican, Bird served as the Progressive Party's gubernatorial candidate in the 1912 and 1913 Massachusetts gubernatorial elections.

== Life ==
Charlies Sumner Bird was born on August 15, 1855, in Walpole, Massachusetts, to Francis William Bird and Abby Frances. In 1877 he graduated from Harvard and joined the Bird Corporation (then named "Bird and Son"), although he had initially wanted to go into law. He expanded the company's mills to Rhode Island and Canada and was one of the first to adopt the eight-hour work day. In 1880 he married Anna J. Child (Jan 12, 1855–Nov 20, 1942) and had four children with her. She became the first woman from Massachusetts to be a member of the Republican National Committee (1921-1928), and was also the founder of a women's suffrage group in Boston.

In 1884 he entered politics, supporting New York Governor Grover Cleveland for president in 1888 and 1892. After William Jennings Bryan won the Democratic nomination in 1896, he left the Democratic Party and joined the pro-gold standard National Democratic Party. During the 1912 presidential election he supported former President Theodore Roosevelt in his attempt to win the Republican nomination and after he left to form the Progressive Party, which Bird joined. In 1912 and 1913, Bird was the Progressive Party's candidate for governor of Massachusetts. Later in life Bird supported the Eighteenth Amendment and attacked unionization as "the greatest crisis that ... this nation has faced for half a century."

On October 9, 1927, Bird died at his home in Walpole, Massachusetts, after being ill for two years. He left behind an estate worth $12,300,000 ($180,723,051 with inflation).

Party political offices
Preceded by Eugene Foss	Progressive nominee for Governor of Massachusetts; 1912, 1913	Succeeded by Joseph H. Walker
