= Ugolki =

Board game

Position: a8 black circle, b8 black circle, c8 black circle, d8 black circle, a7 black circle, b7 black circle, c7 black circle, d7 black circle, a6 black circle, b6 black circle, c6 black circle, d6 black circle, a5 black circle, b5 black circle, c5 black circle, d5 black circle, e4 white circle, f4 white circle, g4 white circle, h4 white circle, e3 white circle, f3 white circle, g3 white circle, h3 white circle, e2 white circle, f2 white circle, g2 white circle, h2 white circle, e1 white circle, f1 white circle, g1 white circle, h1 white circle

Ugolki gameboard and starting setup

Ugolki (Russian: [ʊɡɐɫˈkʲi], Russian: уголки, English: corners) is a two-player board game, similar to halma, that is typically played on an 8×8 grid board with 16 game pieces per player. It is said to have been invented in Europe in the late 18th century. Variations on the size of the board and the number of game pieces also exist.

== Game rules ==
Both players start off with square arrangements of 16 game pieces in opposing corners of the gameboard. Each player's goal is to move all their pieces from the starting corner to the corner occupied by the opponent at the start of the game.

Players take turns moving one game piece. A piece may move only away from the starting location into a destination that is empty, provided either of the following conditions are met:

- the destination square is adjacent to the starting square
- the destination square can be reached by consecutive "jumps" over other game pieces belonging to either player.

The game ends when both players have no available moves left. Game pieces are counted within the square bounds of the final formation, and the player with more pieces wins.
