= Arthur E. Reimer =

American politician (1882–1969)

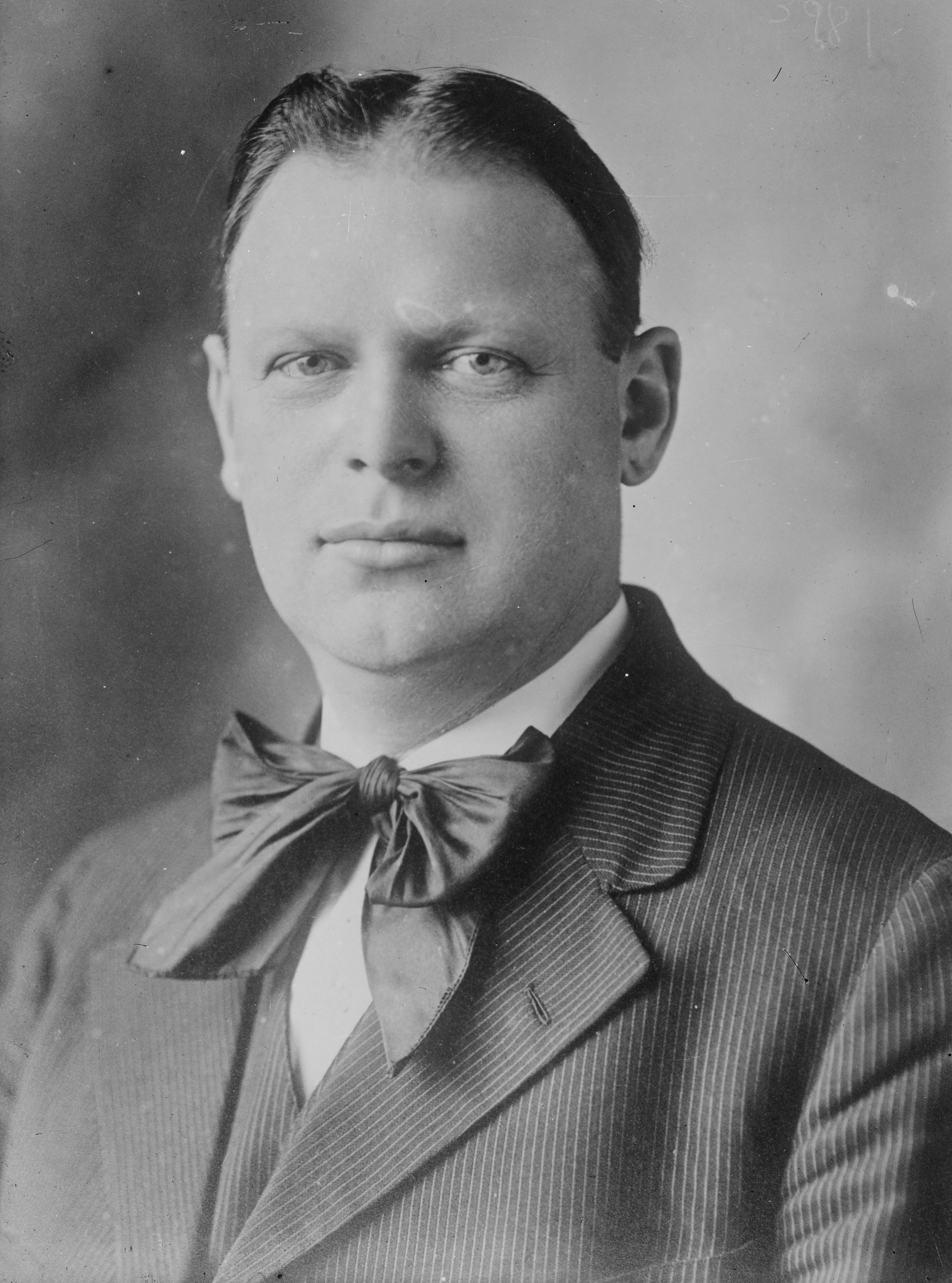
- Reimer in 1918

Personal details
- Born: January 15, 1882 Boston, Massachusetts, U.S.
- Died: c. November 25, 1969 (aged 87)
- Party: Socialist Labor
- Education: Northeastern University

Arthur Reimer, two-time presidential nominee of the Socialist Labor Party.

Arthur Elmer Reimer (January 15, 1882 – November 25, 1969) was an American socialist political activist and politician who was nominated for president by the Socialist Labor Party of America (SLP) in 1912 and 1916.

== Biography ==
=== Early years ===
Arthur Reimer was born January 15, 1882, in Boston, Massachusetts, the son of a machinist. Reimer attended public school in Boston before going on to Northeastern University, also in Boston, where he earned a law degree in 1912.

Reimer worked as a ladies' tailor in his younger years.

=== Political career ===
In 1898 Reimer joined the Socialist Labor Party of America.

In 1905, he was among those SLP members who joined the new Industrial Workers of the World (IWW). However, in 1908, a split regarding strategy and tactics soon led to a split in the IWW. This led to Reimer and other SLP members to establish a rival organization, the Workers International Industrial Union (WIIU).

As a member of WIIU, Reimers was a participant in the 1912 Paterson silk strike.

He was the Socialist Labor Party presidential candidate for the 1912 election. His running mate was August Gillhaus of New York, the SLP's candidate for president in the previous election, that of 1908.

Afforded access to one of the country's leading weekly news magazines of the day in the days before the election, Reimer criticized the rival Socialist Party of America for what he characterized as the attempt of to win piecemeal ameliorative reform and declared a need for revolutionary change:

"Where the social system starts with the private ownership of the necessaries for production, the bolt that, at first, slightly impedes fatedly becomes in the end a total bar to 'opportunity' — so far as the masses are concerned. The chains of wage slavery become more galling... At such a stage of capitalist rotten-ripeness, to look for reformatory redress in the governmental and economic maxims that rocked the cradle of the green infancy of capitalism is to be blind to economic evolution. It is to seek to hold back a runaway horse by the tail....

"Capitalism has organized the forces for and firmly sunk the piers on which to rear the structure of the industrial republic — the social system under which the plants of production are owned collectively and democratically administered. * * *

"Socialism may be summed up in the motto, 'Down with the political state, up with the industrial administration!' ...Afraid, on the one hand, to alienate the vote of the 'furtive Socialists' by a propaganda which these may mistake for anarchism, the Socialist Party suppresses this vital revolutionary feature of socialism; on the other hand, afraid to forfeit the vote of floating, hence anarchistically tainted discontent, the Socialist Party has elected a notorious anarchist [ William D. Haywood ] to its National Executive Committee."

The SLP ticket received 33,070 votes in the 1912 campaign.

In 1913 and again in 191414, Reimer was the SLP nominee for governor of Massachusetts.

In the summer of 1914, Reimer was named the representative of the Socialist Labor Party to the International Socialist Bureau at the meeting of the Second International in Vienna, Austria.

On April 29, 1916, he was nominated by the Socialist Labor Party by acclamation at the 1916 convention with Caleb Harrison as his running mate. During the 1916 campaign, Reimer and Harrison toured the country. Reimer was thrown in jail for a time by the authorities of the mining town of Butte, Montana, for giving a speech on the streets without permission from city officials and was later given a $10 fine that was suspended, while his running mate Harrison suffered a similar fate in the steel city of Homestead, Pennsylvania. During the course of the 1916 campaign, the SLP produced and distributed 1.5 million leaflets in support of the socialist cause, en route to garnering 14,398 votes.

=== Later years ===
The Russian Revolution of 1917 exerted an enormous impact upon the membership of the Socialist Labor Party, as with all on the political left wing in America. A significant section of the SLP exited the party in the 1917–1919 period to join forces with the communist movement in the United States. According to one history, Arthur Reimer was among this group, joining his 1916 vice presidential running mate, Caleb Harrison, Buffalo, New York, druggist and party veteran Boris Reinstein, the late Daniel DeLeon's son, Solon DeLeon, and Dr. Julius Hammer of New York City. Another source, published in 1925 and edited by Solon DeLeon himself, contends that Reimer had not left the embrace of the SLP up to that date.

=== Death and legacy ===
Arthur E. Reimer died in 1969.

== Works ==
- "The Socialist Labor Party's Appeal," The Independent, vol. 73, whole no. 3334 (October 24, 1912), pp. 954–958.
- "Report of the Socialist Labor Party to the International Socialist Congress at Vienna," August 23–29, 1914.
