= Augustus P. Gardner =

American politician

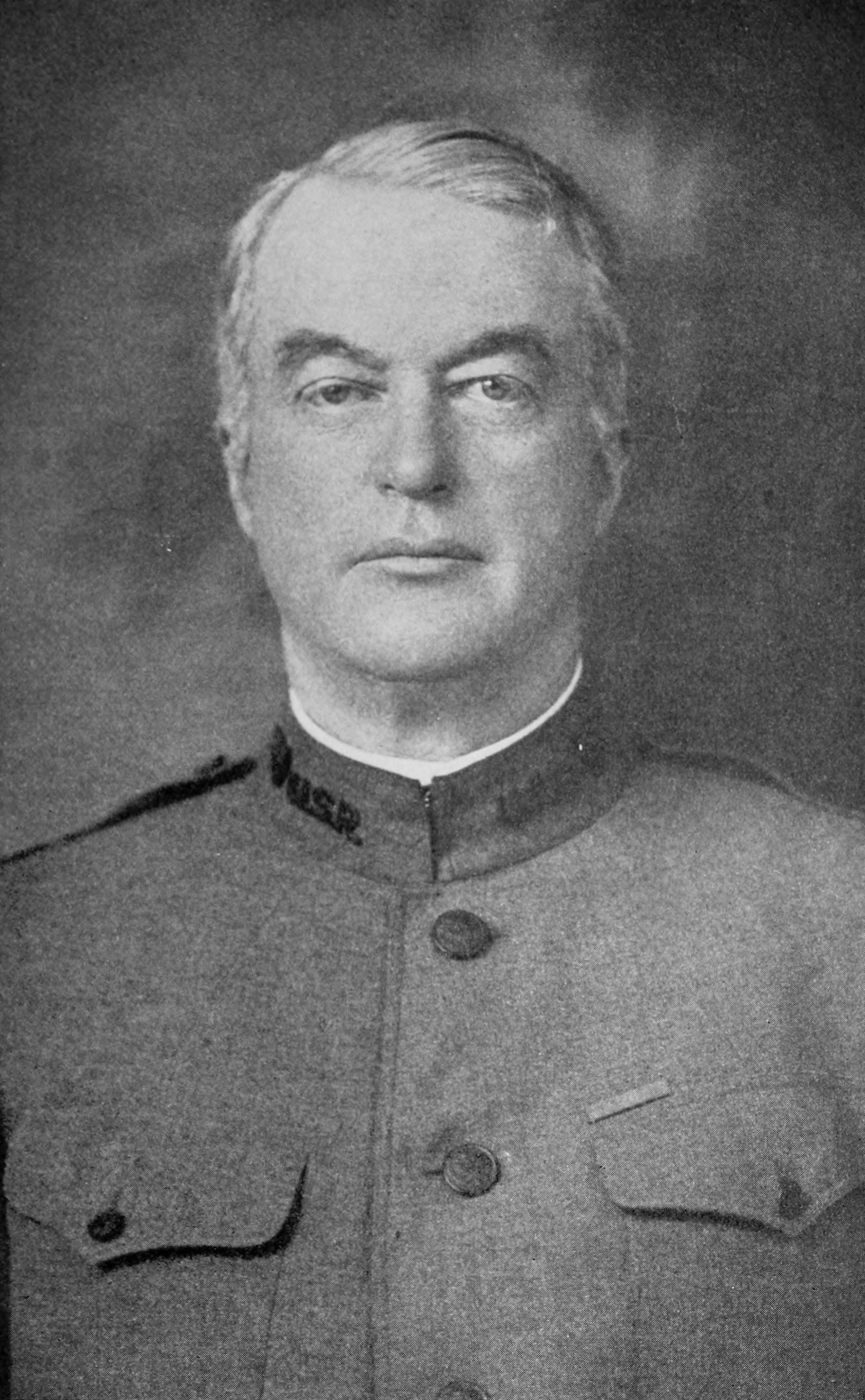
- Gardner c. 1916–18

Member of the U.S. House of Representatives from Massachusetts's 6th district
- In office November 4, 1902 – May 15, 1917
- Preceded by: William Henry Moody
- Succeeded by: Willfred W. Lufkin

Member of the Massachusetts Senate from the 3rd Essex District
- In office January 3, 1900 – December 31, 1901
- Preceded by: Charles O. Bailey
- Succeeded by: Harry C. Foster

Personal details
- Born: Augustus Peabody Gardner; November 5, 1865 Boston, Massachusetts, U.S.
- Died: January 14, 1918 (aged 52) Camp Wheeler, Macon, Georgia, U.S.
- Resting place: Arlington National Cemetery
- Party: Republican
- Spouse: Constance Lodge (m. June 15, 1892)
- Children: Constance Gardner
- Education: Harvard College (A.B. 1886)
- Awards: Distinguished Service Medal

Military service
- Allegiance: United States of America
- Branch/service: United States Army
- Years of service: 1898; 1917–1918
- Rank: Captain and assistant Adjutant General; Colonel, Major
- Unit: Adjutant General's Department; 31st Division; 121st Regiment, United States Infantry
- Battles/wars: Spanish–American War; Battle of Coamo; World War I

Augustus Peabody Gardner (November 5, 1865 – January 14, 1918) was an American military officer and Republican Party politician from Massachusetts. He represented the North Shore region in the Massachusetts Senate and United States House of Representatives in the early 20th century. Through his marriage to Constance Lodge, Gardner was the son-in-law of Henry Cabot Lodge.

== Early life and education ==
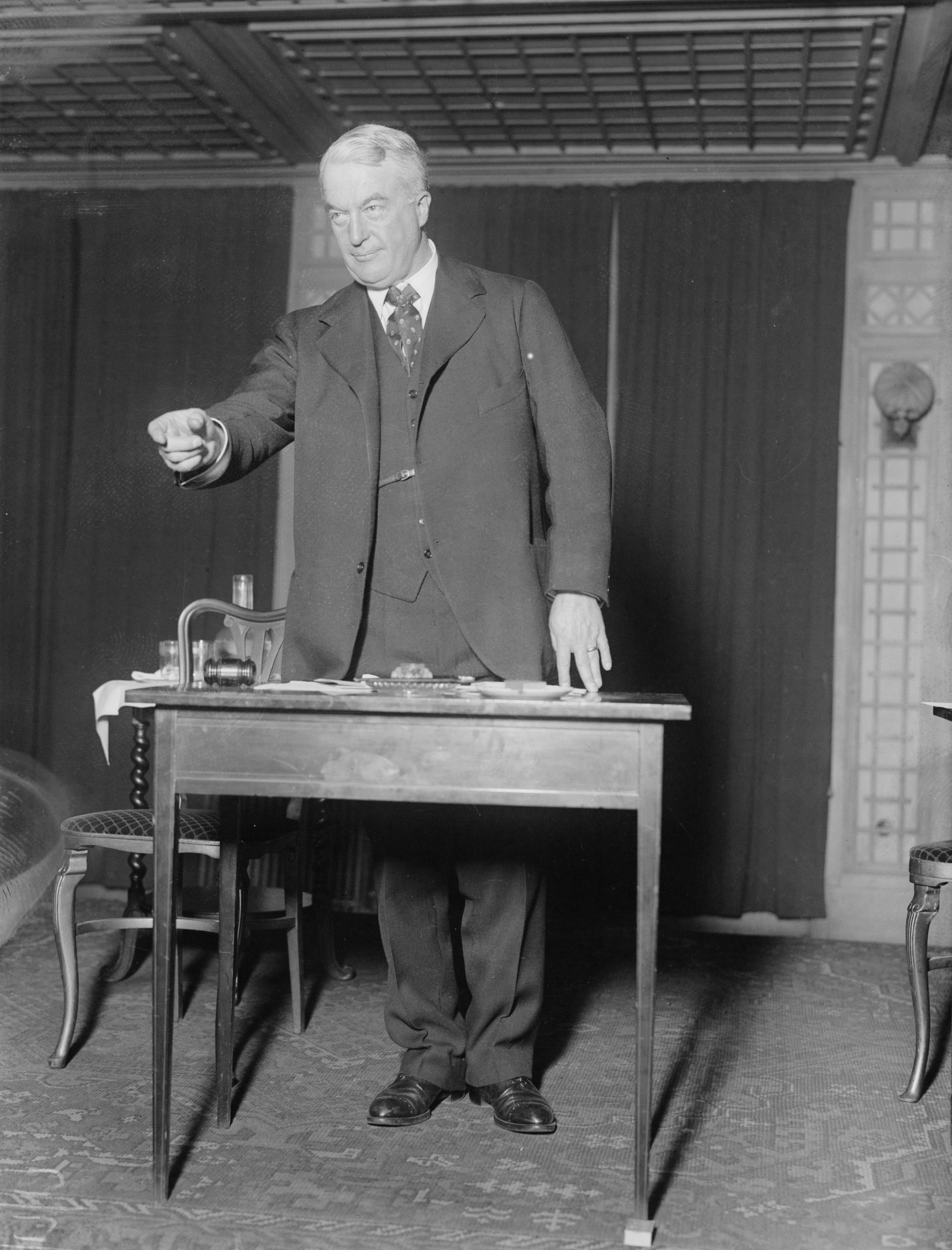
Augustus Peabody Gardner in 1916

Gardner was born in Boston, Massachusetts, on November 5, 1865, to Joseph Peabody Gardner and Harriet Sears Amory. He was the descendant of Thomas Gardner.

His mother died in 1865. After his father died in 1875, Augustus and his two brothers were informally adopted by his uncle John Lowell Gardner II and John's wife, noted art collector and philanthropist Isabella Stewart Gardner.

He graduated from Harvard University in 1886. He studied law at Harvard Law School but never practiced, instead devoting himself to the management of his estate.

On June 14, 1892, Gardner married Constance Lodge, daughter of then-Representative and soon-to-be Senator Henry Cabot Lodge at Saint Anne's Church in Nahant, Massachusetts.

== Spanish–American War ==
Gardner served in the Spanish–American War as a captain and assistant adjutant general on the staff of Major General James Wilson and fought at the Battle of Coamo. He served from May 12 to December 31, 1898.

== Politics ==
Gardner was a member of the Republican Party, like his father-in-law. He was elected to the Massachusetts Senate in 1899 and served from 1900 to 1901.

Gardner was then elected to the Fifty-seventh Congress by special election, after the resignation of United States Representative William H. Moody. Gardner was reelected to the eight succeeding Congresses (November 4, 1902 – May 15, 1917). Gardner was the chairman of the United States House Committee on Industrial Arts and Expositions during the Fifty-ninth and Sixtieth Congresses.

In the House, Gardner favored limiting the powers of the Speaker, placing him in opposition to Republican Speaker Joseph Cannon and his allies. He favored restrictions on immigration and a build-up of the American national military, as opposed to reliance on state militias. He was one of 14 representatives, all Republicans, to oppose the Sixteenth Amendment to the United States Constitution, which imposed a federal income tax.

In 1913, Gardner was the Republican nominee for Governor of Massachusetts, but finished third behind Democrat David I. Walsh and Progressive Charles Sumner Bird.

== World War I ==
=== Rescue of the Lodges from France ===
At the beginning of World War I, Gardner's sister-in-law, Mrs. George Cabot Lodge and her children (Henry, John, and Helene) were stranded in France. In August 1914, Gardner traveled to France to extract them and bring them to safety in London.

=== Resignation from Congress and enlistment ===
Shortly after the United States declared war on Germany in April 1917, Gardner resigned from Congress to enter the army on May 24, 1917, as a colonel in the Adjutant General's Department. He was first assigned to the headquarters of the Eastern Department at Governors Island in New York Harbor and later as adjutant of the 31st Division.

Desiring combat duty, he requested and accepted a demotion to the rank of major on December 8, 1917. He was then placed in command of the 1st Battalion, 121st Infantry, 31st Division at Camp Wheeler in Georgia.

=== Death ===
Gardner died of pneumonia while on active duty at Macon, Georgia, on January 14, 1918. He was buried in Arlington National Cemetery.

In 1923, he was posthumously awarded the Distinguished Service Medal for meritorious service during World War I. His award citation states, "His entire service was characterized by untiring zeal, devotion to duty and marked success." His other military awards were the Spanish Campaign Medal and the World War I Victory Medal.

Constance later remarried to Major General Charles Clarence Williams, U.S. Army Chief of Ordnance.

Party political offices
| Preceded by Joseph H. Walker | Republican nominee for Governor of Massachusetts; 1913 | Succeeded by Samuel W. McCall |
U.S. House of Representatives
| Preceded by William H. Moody | Member of the U.S. House of Representatives from Massachusetts's 6th congressional district November 4, 1902 – May 15, 1917 | Succeeded by Wilfred W. Lufkin |
