= Halma =

Strategy board game

- Board with "camps" marked for two players (turquoise) and four players (red)
- Years active: 1883/84 to present
- Genres: Board game; Abstract strategy game
- Players: 2 or 4
- Setup time: ~1 minute
- Playing time: 10 minutes to 1 or more hours
- Chance: None
- Skills: Strategy, tactics

Halma (from Greek: ἅλμα, romanized: hálma, meaning “leap") is a strategy board game invented in 1883 or 1884 by George Howard Monks, an American thoracic surgeon at Harvard Medical School. His inspiration was the English game Hoppity which was devised in 1854.

The gameboard is checkered and divided into 16×16 squares. Pieces may be small checkers or counters, or wooden or plastic cones or men resembling small chess pawns. Piece colors are typically black and white for two-player games, and various colors or other distinction in games for four players.

== Overview ==
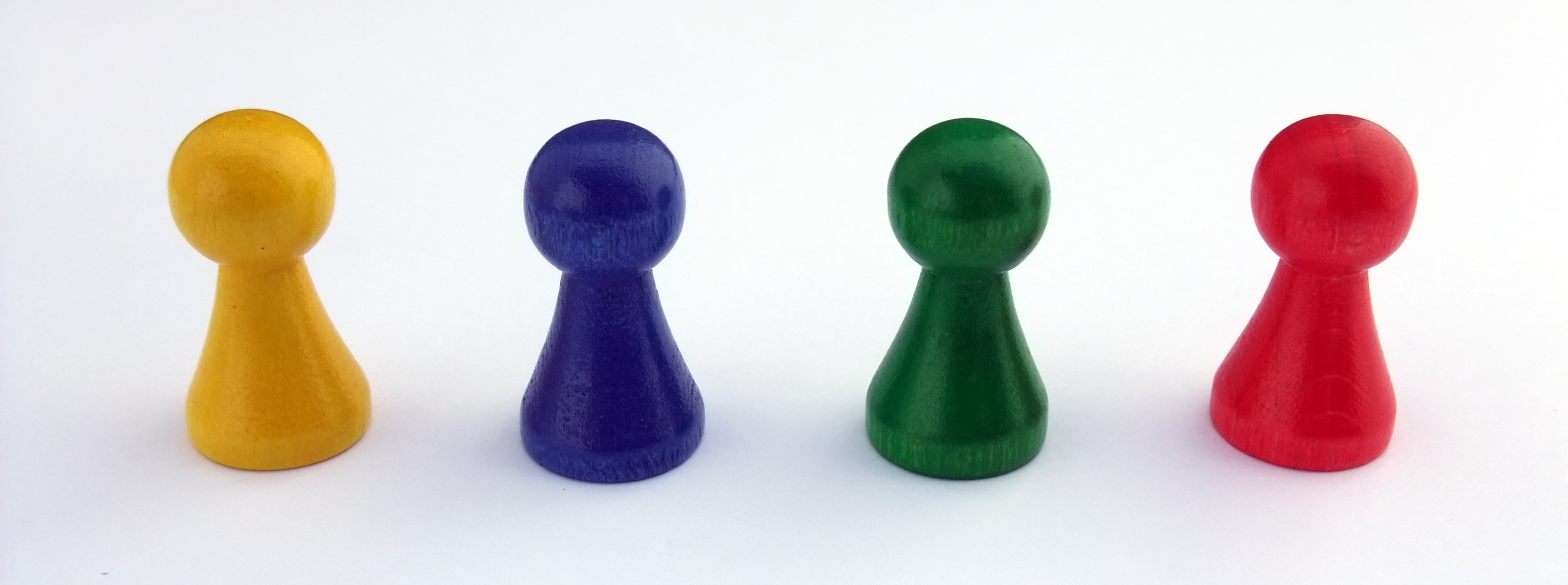
Simple wooden pawn-style playing pieces, often called "Halma pawns"

The game is played by two or four players seated at opposing corners of the board. The game is won by being first to transfer all of one's pieces from one's own camp into the camp in the opposing corner. For four-player games played in teams, the winner is the first team to race both sets of pieces into opposing camps. On each turn, a player either moves a single piece to an adjacent open square, or jumps over one or more pieces in sequence.

== Rules ==
=== Setup ===
Setup for two players

Setup for four players (when played in teams, teammates sit in opposite corners)

The board consists of a grid of 16×16 squares. Each player's camp consists of a cluster of adjacent squares in one corner of the board. These camps are delineated on the board.

- For two-player games, each player's camp is a cluster of 19 squares. The camps are in opposite corners.
- For four-player games, each player's camp is a cluster of 13 squares. Each of the four corners of the board is a camp.

Each player has a set of pieces in a distinct color, of the same number as squares in each camp. The game starts with each player's camp filled by pieces of their own color.

=== Play sequence ===
Valid (green) and invalid (red) moves of a white pawn in Halma

- Players randomly determine who will move first.
- Each player's turn consists of moving a single piece of one's own color. Pieces can move in eight possible directions (orthogonally and diagonally), in one of the following plays:
  - One move to an empty square. Place the piece in an empty adjacent square. This move ends the play.
  - One or more jumps over adjacent pieces. An adjacent piece of any color can be jumped if there is an adjacent empty square on the directly opposite side of that piece. Place the piece in the empty square on the opposite side of the jumped piece.

A piece that is jumped over is unaffected and remains on the board. After any jump, one may make further jumps using the same piece, or end the play.

- Once a piece has reached the opposing camp, a play cannot result in that piece leaving the camp.
- If the current play results in having every square of the opposing camp occupied by one's own pieces, the acting player wins. Otherwise, play proceeds clockwise around the board.

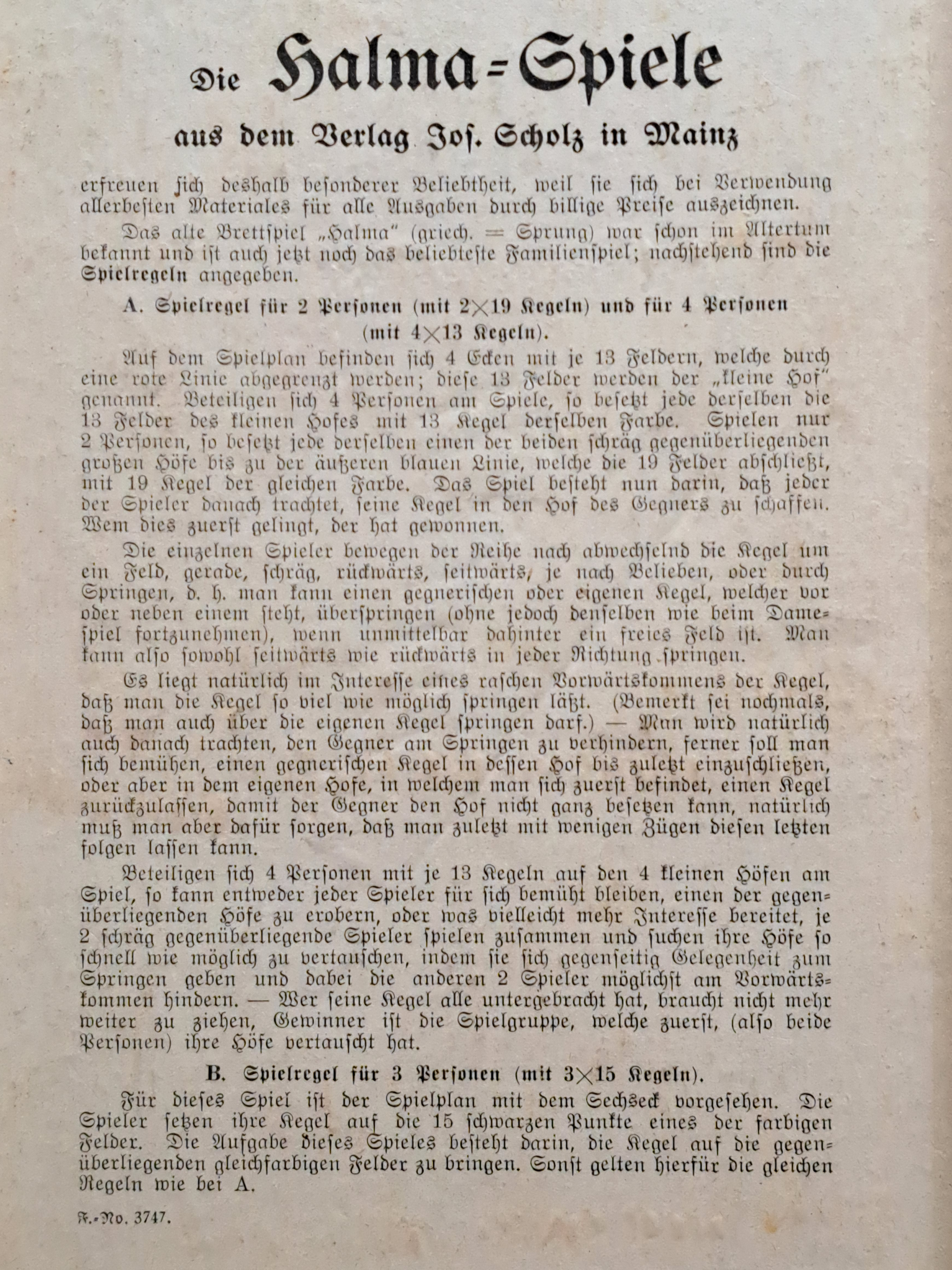
Rules of Halma as printed by Joseph Scholz Verlag, Mainz

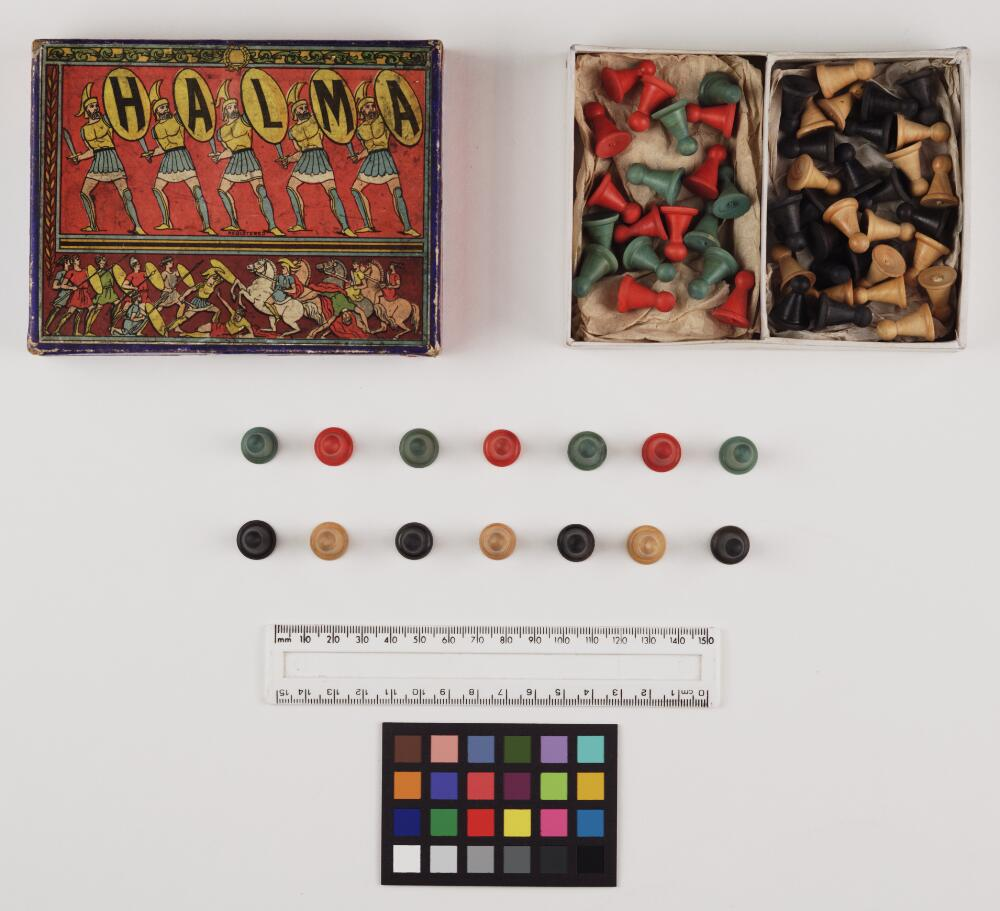
Halma set from the 1890s, showing box and pieces

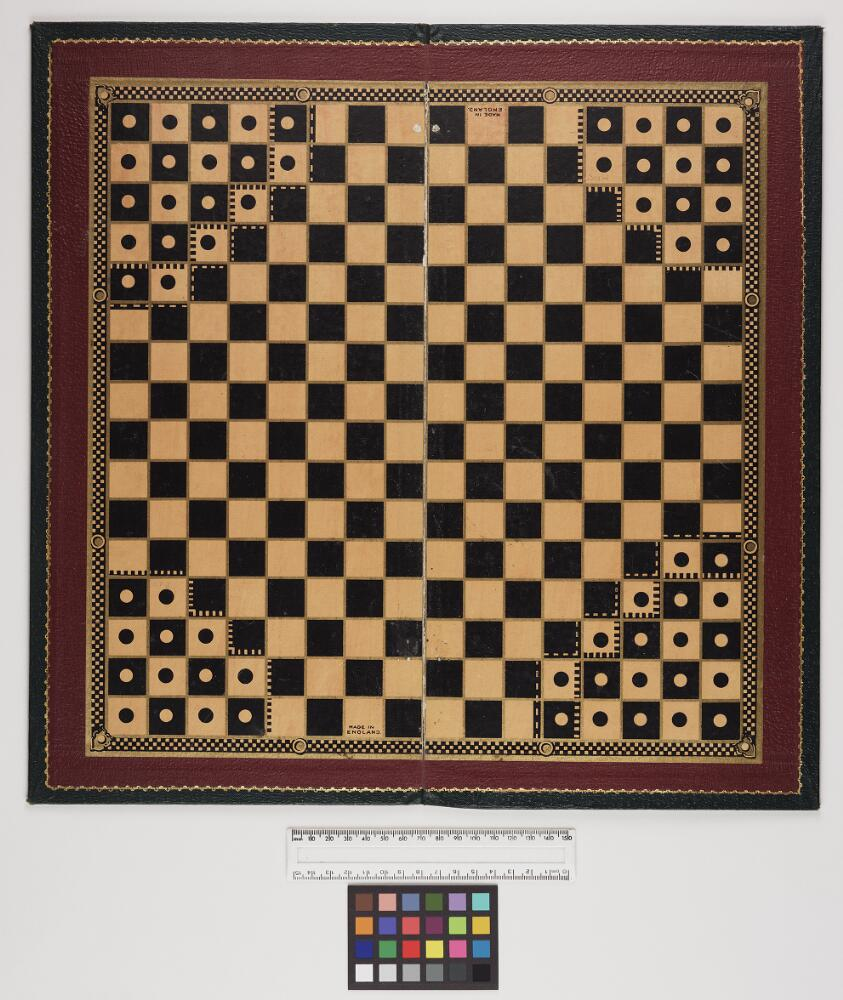
16×16 Halma board from the 1890s

== Basic strategy and tactics ==
A game of Halma has three distinct phases. The beginning (before opposing pieces come into contact) is usually a set-piece battle, with players setting up their favoured openings. The middle (when opposing pieces are blocking or jumping each other) is usually characterised by opportunistic play; the player with the most patience to check the whole board for opportunities, including those gained by moving backwards in order to move forwards, will gain an advantage. Players should also set up for the endgame (when opposing pieces have passed one another and must run for home), avoiding stragglers.

As with most board games, early control of the center is a key tactic, as it provides additional mobility. Pieces can form a two-layer blocking wall, deflecting the opponent from the center and forcing them into a longer trajectory; however, if the opponent builds an adjacent wall, then the first player to disband their wall usually suffers a strategic disadvantage.

Paired pieces move faster than single pieces in the endgame. This means that a player with a pair of "leapfrogging" pieces has an advantage over a player with two individual stragglers.

The larger boards have more strategic combinations available than the smaller boards, and the four player game offers more tactical intrigue than the two-player game.

In the 8×8 version of the game, the middle-game involves three main considerations: keep your army together; make jumps as long as possible, particularly diagonally; and avoid stranded pieces. The end-game is akin to a puzzle race with each side trying the minimum number of intricate moves to reach the final position.

== Variations ==
There are also 8×8 and 10×10 board variations, either of which is adequate for two players and they have 10 and 15 pieces per player, respectively, and a version for three players each with fifteen pieces arranged as a six-pointed star.

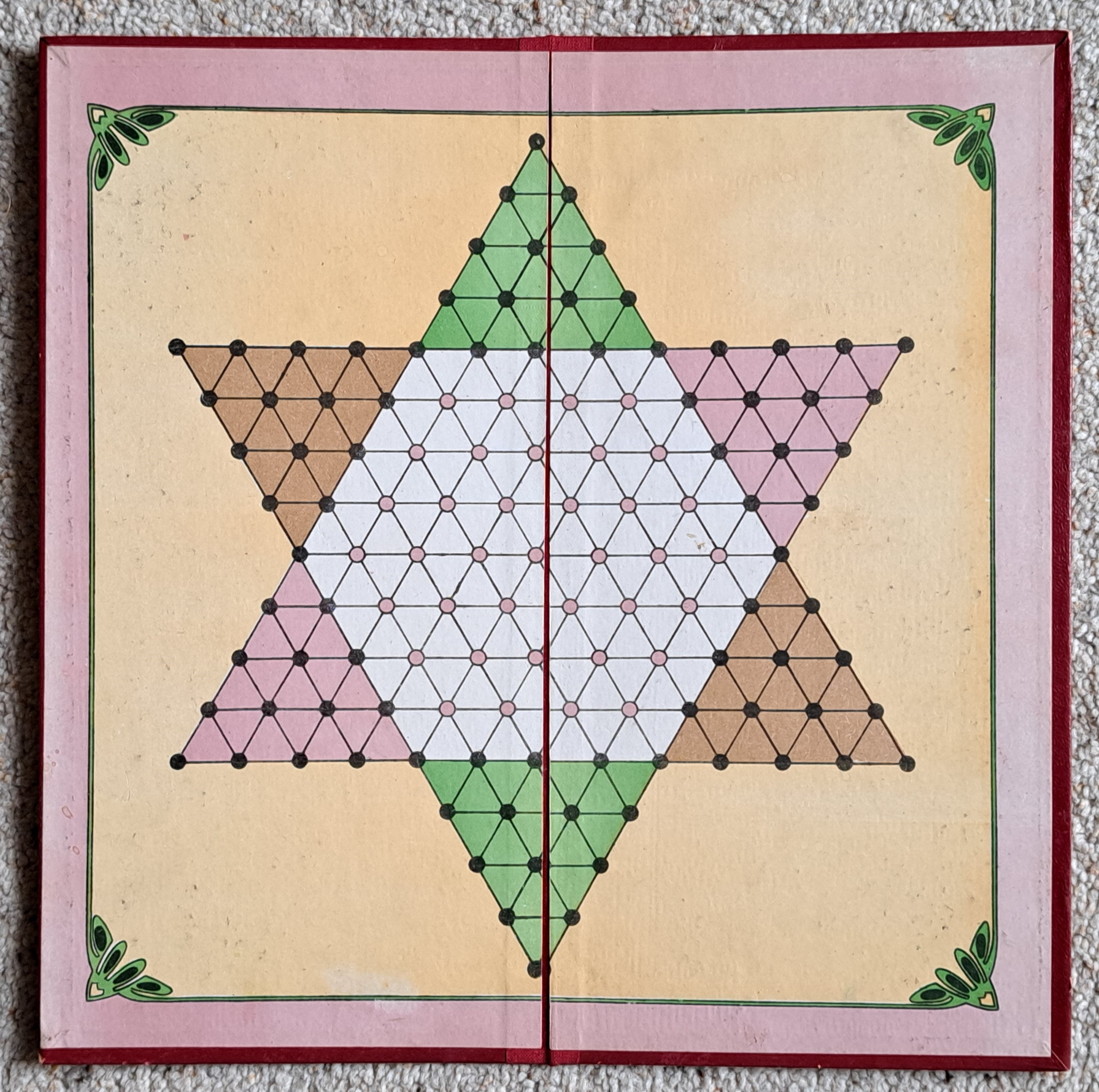
Halma board for three players, printed by Joseph Scholz Verlag, Mainz (undated)

There are various online versions, usually for two-player, turn-based play. Some sites implement a rule variation stating that a player automatically loses if they still have a piece in their start region after a certain number of moves (typically 30 for the 8×8 game, 50 for the 10×10 game). Fast-advancing players occasionally attempt to blockade an opposing piece, but this tactic can backfire if the other player is aware of it. In non-electronic versions, the number of moves is not normally counted.

== Comparison to other games ==
The mechanic of jumping pieces is reminiscent of draughts (checkers) but differs in that no opposing pieces are ever captured or otherwise withdrawn from the board, nor is jumping compulsory.

Chinese Checkers, a variant of Halma, was originally published in 1892 as Stern-Halma (German for "Star Halma") and later renamed upon marketing to the United States to appear more exotic. The name is misleading, since the game has no historical connection with China, nor is it a checkers game.

== Notable appearances in popular culture ==
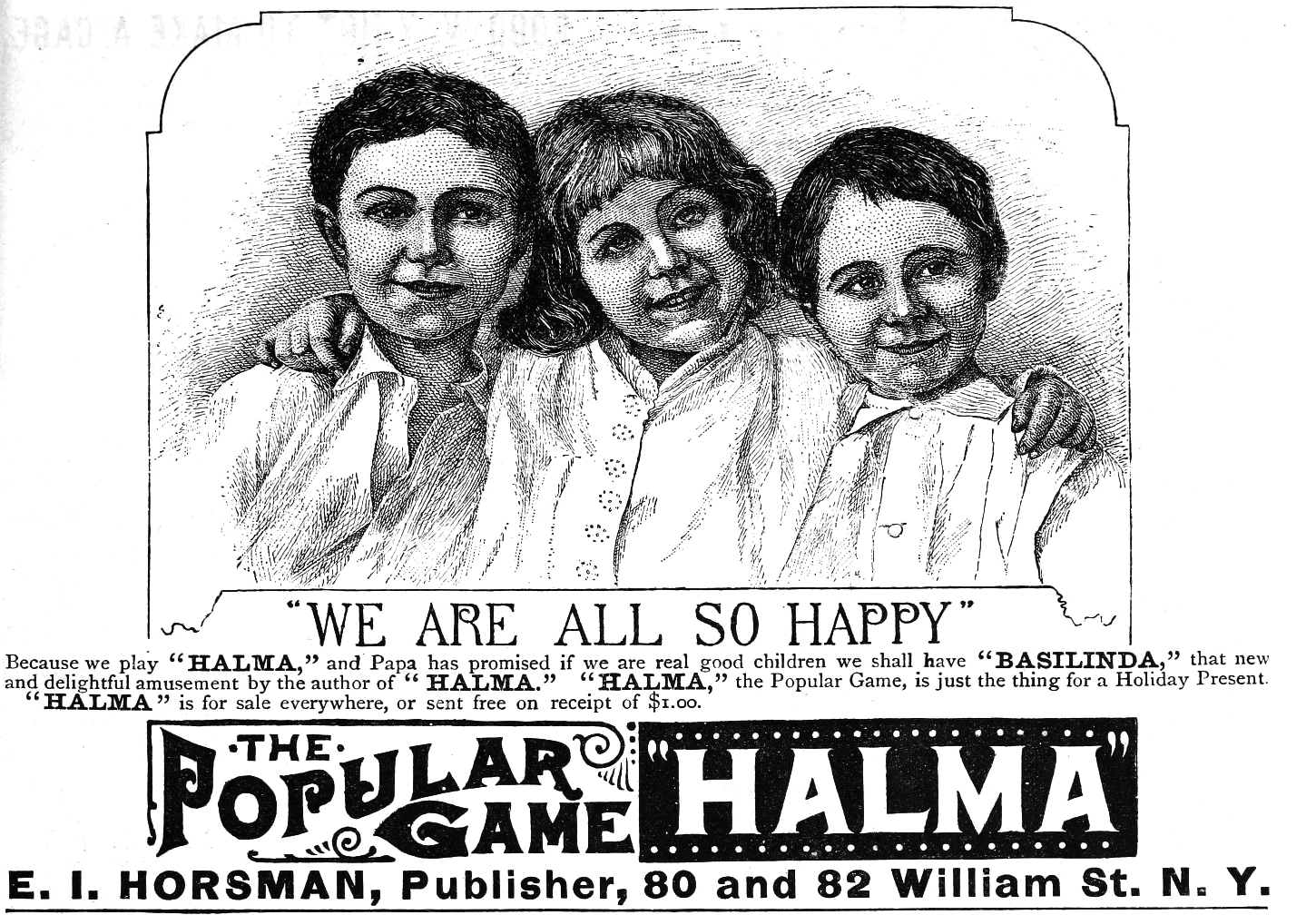
1890 magazine advertisement

- In James Joyce's Ulysses, Halma is mentioned in Chapter 17.
- In Upton Sinclair's Dragon's Teeth, Lanny Budd, the novel's protagonist, is taught to play Halma by his cellmate in Chapter 28, section IV.
- An illustration in "Schoolgirl's Annual" of 1941 shows a Halma game being upset during a disturbance.
- Talking Halma pieces are featured in the Rupert the Bear story "Rupert and the Jumping Men," Rupert Annual 1976.
- In E. Nesbit's The Magic City, the land of Somnolentia is inhabited by Halma people.
- In Mona Caird's The Daughters of Danaus, the main protagonist Hadria Fullerton sarcastically wishes to learn Bezique or Halma in order to be a more acquiescent woman.
- Mervyn Peake twice compares distant people to halma pieces, in his novels Mr Pye and Titus Groan.
- Paul Jennings described the hilarious results of his attempt to decipher the rules of the game from a set of instructions in German in his article "How to Spiel Halma".
- Rickie plays Halma against himself as a lonely child in the novel The Longest Journey (novel) by E.M. Forster.
- Eleanor Farjeon talks about playing Halma in her autobiography A Nursery in the Nineties, and about using black, white, and red Halma pieces to enact a Christmas Eve ritual game in which imaginary characters try to climb a mountain made of Anchor Stone Blocks.
- In The Chalet School and Jo from the Chalet School series by Elinor Brent-Dyer, Halma is played by two of the characters.
- In Episode 9 of the original radio series, The Hitchhiker's Guide to the Galaxy by Douglas Adams, Eddie, the overly cheerful computer of starship, Heart of Gold, tries to calm the crew facing imminent, certain death at the hands of an approaching Vogon fleet, by suggesting that they play electronic Halma.
- Halma is mentioned in Terry Pratchett's Unseen Academicals
- George Sherston, the narrator of Siegfried Sassoon's Memoirs of an Infantry Officer, becomes frustrated when his Aunt suggests a game of Halma at a point when he is consumed by anti-war feeling.
- Halma is mentioned in Compton Mackenzie's Rich Relatives.
- Halma is mentioned in O. Douglas's Eliza For Common.
- Halma is mentioned in Lissa Evans's Small Bomb At Dimperly.
- In Joan Lindsay's Picnic at Hanging Rock, Halma is one of the games (along with Snakes and Ladders) played by two of the characters during a summer courtship.
- In Lawrence Durrell's 'The Black Book'.
- In E.M. Forster's Maurice.
- In Evelyn Waugh's Brideshead Revisited, Lady Julia Flyte refers to playing Halma with the family's nanny (p. 76).
- In Evelyn Waugh's Black Mischief, Sir Samson Courteney, The British Envoy, cries out when the Legation is being besieged "It's no good. My heart is not in halma this evening."
- Halma is mentioned in Susan Hill's The Lady in Black (Chapter-In the Nursery).
- A 'Bean', hospitalised after a car accident at the Marble Arch, is playing Halma with a nurse in 'The Amazing Hat Mystery' first collected in Young Men In Spats by PG Wodehouse.
- Halma is the game Tom and Barbara Good take to bed in Ser 3, Ep 1 "The Early Birds" in The Good Life (1975 TV series), a game which they apparently never understood.
- Halma is mentioned in Rhoda Power's memoir of life as a governess in Rostov-on-Don at the start of the Bolshevik revolution.
- Danny Shields plays Halma with his son Billy in the 1935 book The Shipbuilders by George Blake.

== See also ==
- Ugolki
