= American Peace Award =

Award

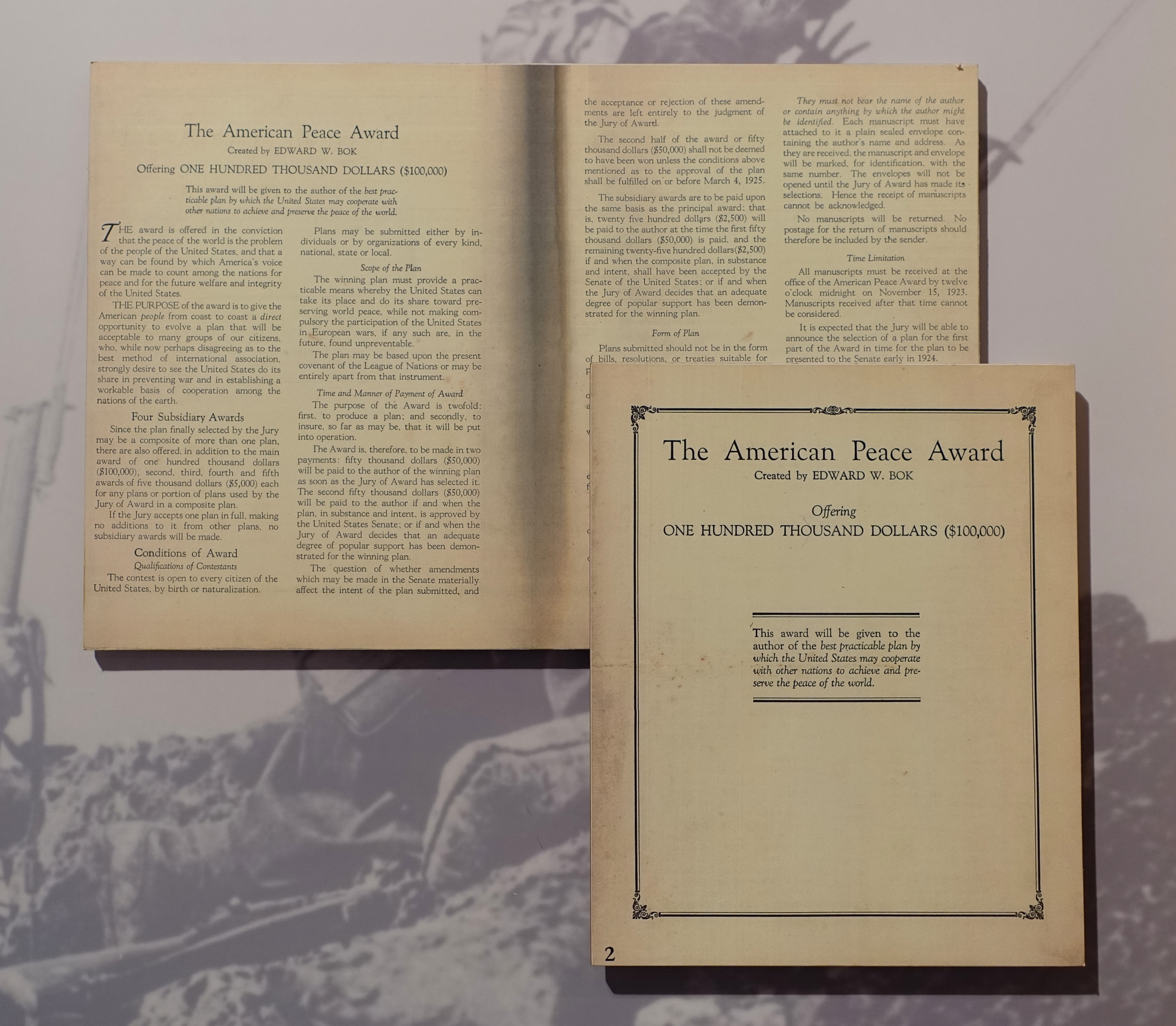
The American Peace Award, 1923

The American Peace Award is awarded to American citizens working to further the cause of world peace.

== The 1924 American Peace Award ==
The American Peace Award was created in 1923 by Edward Bok, who believed that the United States government was not taking initiative to promote peace in the world. $100,000 was to be awarded to the person submitting "the best practicable plan by which the United States may co-operate with other nations for the achievement and preservation of world peace." The first half of the prize was awarded upon the selection of the plan by a jury, and the remainder upon acceptance by the United States Senate or showing "sufficient popular support". The 1924 American Peace Award received plans from thousands of applicants, and caught the interest of the Senate.

22,165 plans were submitted, many being composite works from organizations. Franklin D. Roosevelt drafted a plan for the contest but did not submit it because his wife Eleanor Roosevelt was selected as a judge for the prize. His plan called for a new world organization that would replace the League of Nations. Although Roosevelt had been the vice-presidential candidate on the Democratic ticket of 1920 that supported the League of Nations, by 1924 he was ready to scrap it. His draft of a "Society of Nations" accepted the reservations proposed by Henry Cabot Lodge in the 1919 Senate debate. The new Society would not become involved in the Western Hemisphere, where the Monroe Doctrine held sway. It would not have any control over any military forces. Although Roosevelt's plan was never made public, he thought about the problem a great deal, and incorporated some of his 1924 ideas into his design for the United Nations in 1944–1945.

The final plan was selected by an award jury of seven prominent individuals:

- Elihu Root, Chairman
- James Guthrie Harbord
- Edward M. House
- Ellen Fitz Pendleton
- Roscoe Pound
- William Allen White
- Brand Whitlock

Plan number 1469 was selected as it was said to be "the best practicable by which the United States by which the United States may cooperate with other nations to achieve and preserve the peace of the world."

The prize was awarded in February 1924 to Dr. Charles Herbert Levermore, who was secretary of the World's Court League, the League of Nations Union, and the New York Peace Society, and former president of Adelphi College. Levermore's plan suggested the United States adhere to the Permanent Court of International Justice and should extend its cooperation with the League of Nations.

== The contemporary American Peace Award ==
The American Peace Award was established in 2008 as a prize awarded to an American citizen or citizens working to further the cause of world peace, in the spirit of Edward W. Bok's original award. The American Peace Award is awarded by an advisory committee of artists, who present each recipient with an original work of art to honor their efforts.

=== Recipients ===
- 2008 – Cindy Sheehan
- 2009 – Rosalynn Carter and Jimmy Carter
- 2010 – Greg Mortenson
- 2011 – Roy Bourgeois

== See also ==
- Ellen Fitz Pendleton, first woman to serve as juror to award the American Peace Prize (1923).
