= C. W. Allen =

American businessman

- Born: October 17, 1872
- Known for: American businessman

C.W. Allen was an American businessman who was a prominent African-American citizen of Mobile, Alabama, in the early 20th century.

== Early life and education ==
Allen was born October 17, 1872, to a poor family. He attended Mobile public schools and Mobile's Emerson Institute, a school for African Americans established by the American Missionary Association. He began working in a menial position at 15 years old and gradually worked his way up to employment in the government service in the position of carrier in the Mobile post office, a position he held for ten years.

== Career ==
He became a dealer in real estate in partnership with James T. Peterson, and engaged in this business for several years. The firm operated under the name of Peterson & Allen, and it was one of the leading real estate firms in Alabama.

In 1904, Allen, in partnership with Mr. Harney, purchased the undertaking firm of A.N. Johnson, which at that time was one of the costliest funeral establishments in the South. After purchasing the business, they added to its equipment, making it among the most modern undertaking establishments in the United States. The company interred approximately one-third of all of those who died in Mobile, irrespective of race, as of 1911.

The firm A.N. Johnson also had the side business of publishing the Mobile Weekly Press, a significant weekly newspaper covering issues of interest to the African-American community in Mobile.

Allen was also prominent in fraternal circles. He was Secretary-Treasurer of the Masonic Endowment Fund for the State of Alabama. He was also one of the leading members of the Knights of Pythias and Odd Fellows of the State of Alabama. He was also a member of the Republican State Executive Committee, and was a delegate to the 1908 Republican National Convention.

== Personal life ==
He married Josephine Blackledge, also of Mobile, on June 6, 1893. She was a teacher and founded the Josephine Allen Private School in 1898. They had one son.
