= Charles Herbert Levermore =

American academic and peace activist

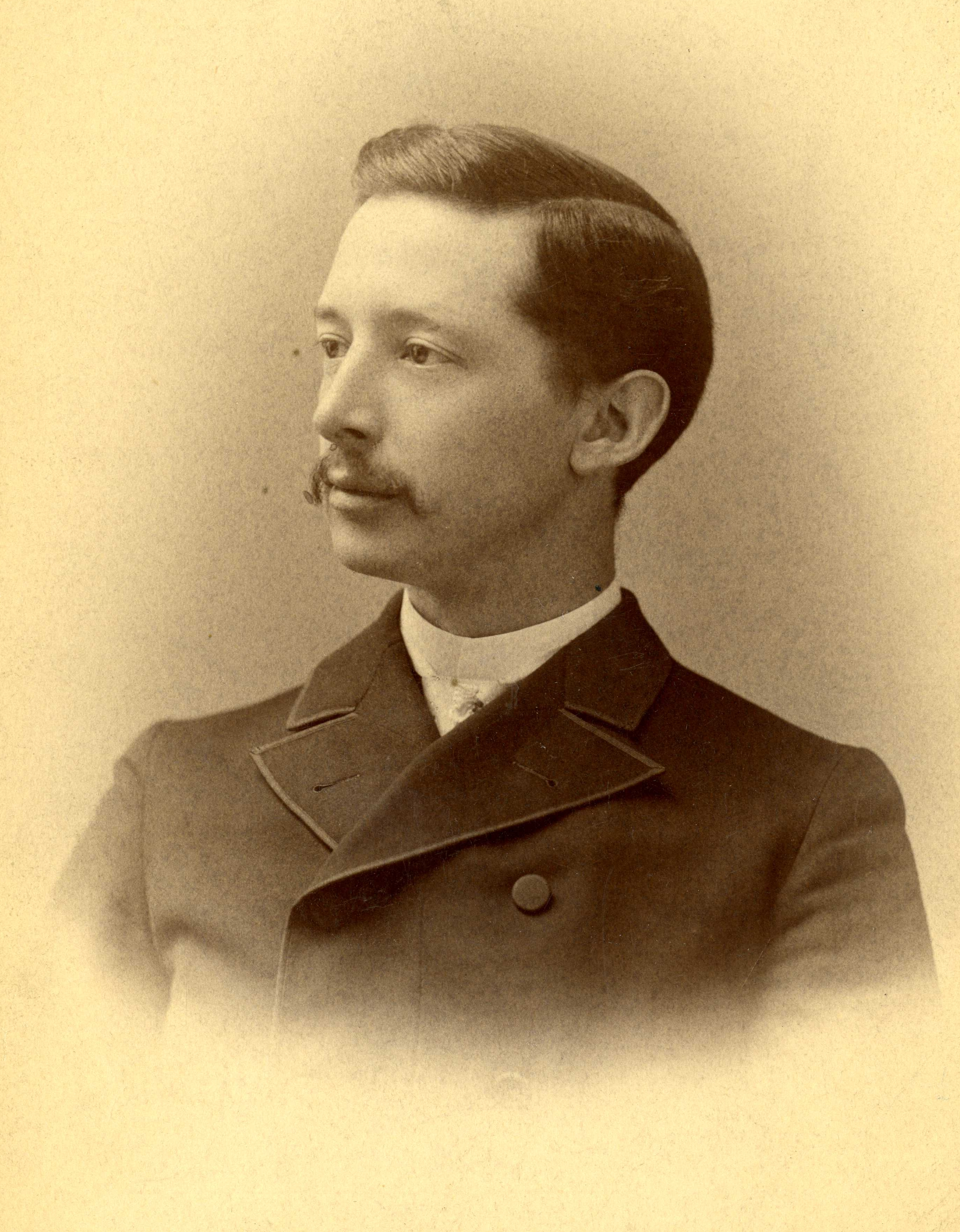
c. 1886

Charles Herbert Levermore (October 15, 1856 – October 20, 1927) was an American academic and peace activist. He was a founder and the first president of Adelphi University from 1896 to 1912. He won the American Peace Award in 1924. He was corresponding secretary of the World's Court League in 1919, secretary of the League of Nations Union, and secretary of the New York Peace Society. He was a founding member of the Union League in New York City.

== Biography ==
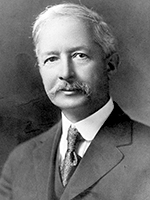
Charles Herbert Levermore circa 1896–1912

Charles Herbert Levermore was born on October 15, 1856, in Mansfield, Connecticut.

Levermore attended Yale University, where he received an A.B., class of 1879, and Johns Hopkins University, where he received a Ph.D. in 1885. At the latter institution he became friends with a young Thomas Woodrow Wilson, both being fellow members of the Glee Club. Later he became a professor of history at Massachusetts Institute of Technology. Levermore was appointed head of Adelphi Academy in 1893 and subsequently established the liberal arts Adelphi College in Brooklyn, NY in 1896. Adelphi's main administrative building, Levermore Hall, is named after him and the university's flagship global honors program also bears his name – the Levermore Global scholars Program.

In 1924, Levermore attempted to mobilize support for the League of Nations, conceived by his former classmate, President Woodrow Wilson. Levermore was awarded the American Peace Award, created the year before by Edward Bok, for "the best practicable plan by which the United States may co-operate with other nations to achieve and preserve the peace of the world." This plan would have had the United States enter the League of Nations under special status. However, ultimately, this also proved unsuccessful.

He died on October 20, 1927, in Berkeley, California.

== Books ==
- Levermore, Charles H. "Henry C. Carey and his Social System," Political Science Quarterly, Vol. 5, No. 4, Dec., 1890.
