= Ellen Fitz Pendleton =

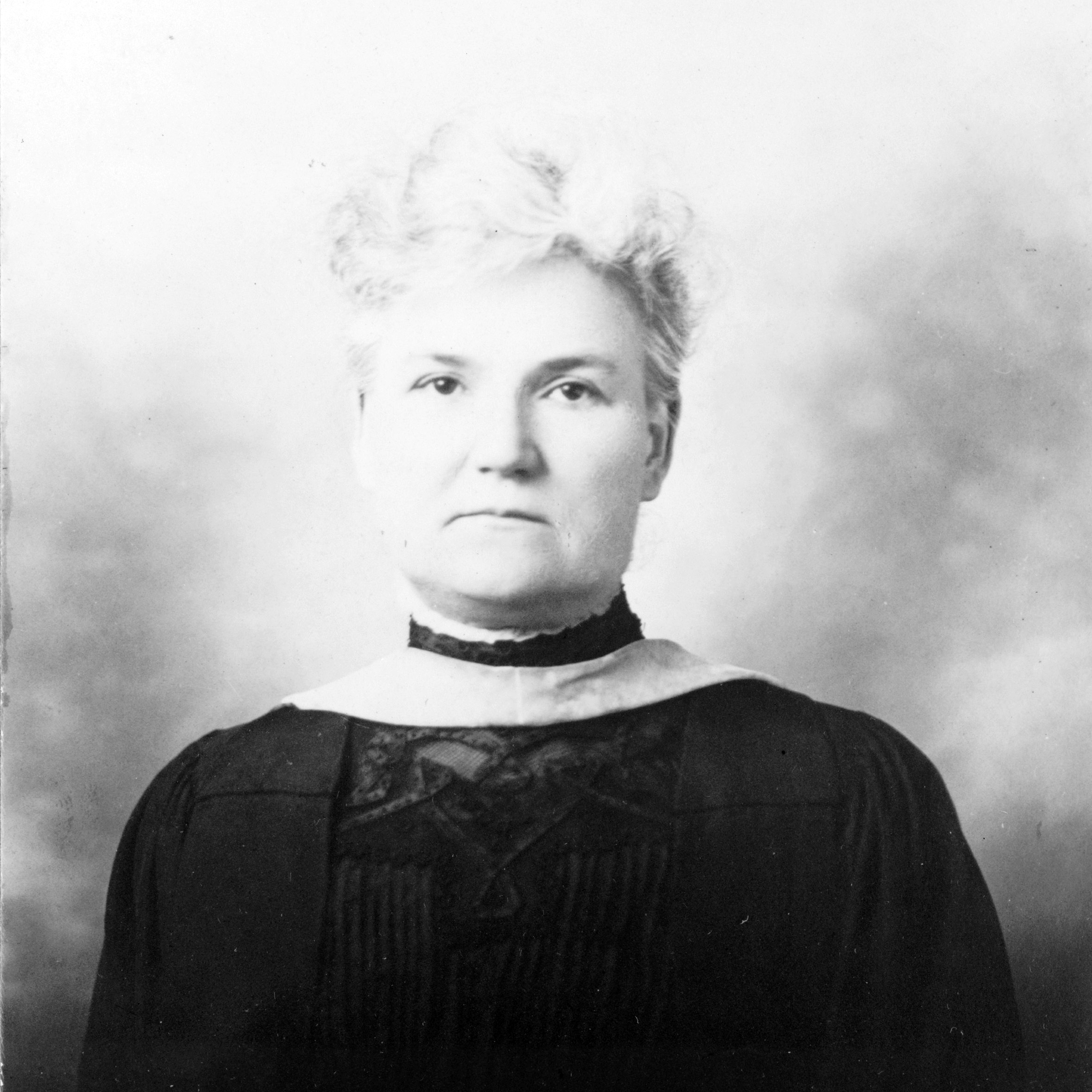
Ellen F. Pendleton (1910)

Ellen Fitz Pendleton (August 7, 1864 – July 26, 1936) was an American educator. She was president of Wellesley College for 25 years and notably expanded it financially and physically.

== Early life ==
Pendleton was born in Westerly, Rhode Island on August 7, 1864. She was the youngest of nine children of Enoch Burrows Pendleton and Mary Ette (Chapman) Pendleton, and a descendant of Brian Pendleton who was the first in her family line to immigrate to America from England in 1632 and settled in Watertown, Massachusetts.

== Career ==
Pendleton attended Wellesley College and received her Bachelor of Arts degree in 1886. She then became a tutor at the college in 1886. She became a full-time instructor in mathematics at the college in 1888. Pendleton took post-graduate courses at Newham College in England in 1889–1890 and received a degree of Master of Arts from Wellesley College in 1891.

In 1897, Pendleton became secretary at Wellesley College, holding that position until 1901 at which time she became associate professor of mathematics and put in charge of College Hall. In 1902, she became dean of the college. She served as acting president in 1910 before assuming the presidency as the sixth president of Wellesley College. She was inaugurated October 19, 1911, being the first woman graduate to be elected president.

Pendleton initiated a major rebuilding of the college facility grounds. College Hall was destroyed by fire in March 1914. This building had the classrooms, offices, dormitory quarters, and library. Pendleton built temporary quarters for her students within three weeks to hold classes. Over the next ten years a 3-million-dollar campaign she promoted resulted in construction of several new buildings. Before Pendleton retired she initiated many new buildings on the college grounds and created a $10-million endowment during her presidency; she was president of Wellesley College for 25 years.

Pendleton was a supporter of academic freedom. She instituted an honors program during her presidency and rejected the introduction of vocational and specialized courses. She supported "a wide liberal education, independent study, and freedom in choosing electives by the undergraduates". She supported academic freedom for pacifists during World War I. She opposed the Massachusetts Teachers' Oath of 1935 requiring loyalty oaths. Nobel Peace Prize winner Emily Greene Balch had once sent a letter to the president of Wellesley College in 1918 and wrote that one should follow "the ways of Jesus". Wellesley College trustees terminated her contract in 1919. Pendleton strongly opposed her dismissal for support of academic freedom.

Pendleton was a member of the Wellesley College examination board and helped liberalize the structure of the exams. She was the first woman to serve on a panel to award the American Peace Prize. This prize was established by Edward Bok in 1923. As a member of the Naples Table Association she supported women's scientific research. She received the honorary Doctor of Letters degree from Brown University in 1911 and that of Doctor of Laws degree from Mount Holyoke College in 1912.

== Retirement and death ==
Pendleton gave her intentions to retire from Wellesley College in February 1935. She ultimately retired in June 1936. Pendleton died the next month on July 26 in Newton, Massachusetts of a paralytic stroke.

== Sources ==
- Barnhart, Clarence L. (1954). Cyclopedia of Names. Appleton-Century-Crofts.
- Colby, Frank Moore (1917). The New International Encyclopædia. Dodd, Mead and Company.
- Commire, Anne (2007). Dictionary of Women Worldwide: M-Z. Thomson Gale. ISBN 978-0-7876-9394-7.
- Educational (1911). The American Educational Review. American Educational Company.
- Ogilvie, Marilyn Bailey (2000). Dictionary of Women. Taylor & Francis. ISBN 978-0-415-92040-7.
- Read, Phyllis J. (1992). Women's Firsts. Random House Information Group. ISBN 978-0-679-40975-5. "Ellen Fitz Pendleton was the first woman to serve as juror to award the American Peace Prize (1923)."
- White (1926). "Ellen Fitz Pendleton". National Cyclopedia Am Biography. J.T. White & Company.
