= Bouck White =

American novelist

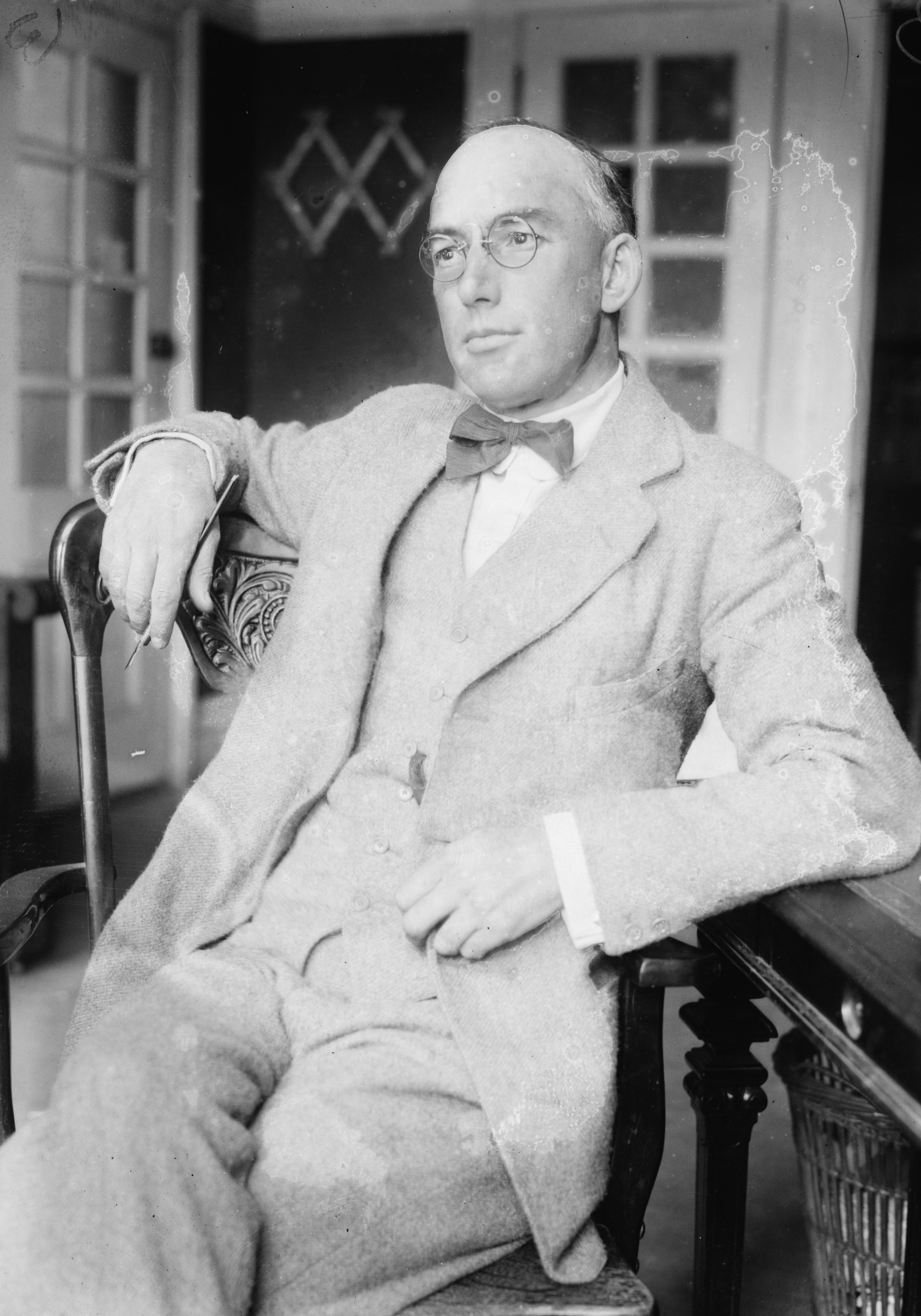
- Bouck White circa 1915-1916
- Born: Charles Browning White; October 20, 1874; Middleburgh, New York
- Died: January 7, 1951 (aged 76); Menands, New York
- Occupations: Novelist, minister, political activist, potter
- Writing career
- Notable works: Quo Vaditis (1903), The Book of Daniel Drew (1910), The Call of the Carpenter (1911), The Mixing (1913), The Carpenter and the Rich Man (1914), and Letters from Prison (1915)

Charles Browning "Bouck" White (October 20, 1874 – January 7, 1951) was a Congregational minister, American socialist, Jesusist, author, potter, and recluse.

== Early years ==
Charles Browning White, known to family and friends as "Bouck", was born at Middleburgh, Schoharie County, New York, the son of Charles Addison and Mary (Bouck) White. White used Middleburgh as background in his book The Mixing (1913) and described the thinly veiled residents as "degenerative Dutchmen." Middleburgh residents sued and retorted that White was "a male child born some years ago in the village, whose early stupidity gave no indication of his future precocity."

After graduating from Middleburgh High School, he entered Harvard College in 1894, studied journalism, and graduated in 1896 (A.B.). He worked as a reporter for the Springfield Republican, received his "call," and attended Boston Theological Seminary. In 1902 he graduated from Union Theological Seminary of New York City, and worked as a minister in the Ramapo Mountains near West Point.

He published his first book, Quo vaditis?: A call to the old moralities, in 1903. A typical selection shows that, from the beginning, he was against the money-making spirit in the land. "I have seen a People crazed with new-got riches, a drunk-headed People, a People giddied with great possessions. A wildness was upon them, but it was not a wildness for the desirables of life."

After a year at Ramapo he became pastor of the Congregational Church of the Thousand Islands at Clayton, New York for the next three years. White was ordained a Congregational minister in 1904. He then accepted the position of head of the Men's Social Service department in Holy Trinity Episcopal Church, Brooklyn, where he remained until he was dismissed in 1913.

== Socialist Activities ==
While at Holy Trinity, White worked on several books. The Book of Daniel Drew (1910) was "A Study in the Psychology of Wall Street. A fascinating story of the mental evasions and feats of ethical juggling of one hopelessly caught in the system." The 1937 movie The Toast of New York, starring Cary Grant, Edward Arnold, and Frances Farmer, was based on this book.

The Call of the Carpenter (1911), which portrayed Jesus of Nazareth as a workingman, agitator, and social revolutionist, went too far and caused White's dismissal from Holy Trinity. He formed his own church, the Church of the Social Revolution, and Eugene V. Debs observed that White was "the only Christian minister" in New York.

In The Carpenter and the Rich Man (1914), "Bouck White shows in vivid and absorbing fashion Jesus as the leader of the great proletarian surge of his time. The immorality of being rich when other people are poor, is the keynote of this book, and the author bases it on the message of the Carpenter as found in the parables."

Another politically active minister, Methodist John Wesley Hill, debated the resolution "Resolved: That socialism is a peril to the state and the church" with White at Webster Hall in Manhattan on May 7, 1913, with suffragist Inez Milholland moderating.

A member of the Socialist Party of America until he was removed because of his religious beliefs, White appeared on May 10, 1914, at a service of the Fifth Avenue Baptist Church, to which the Rockefeller family belonged, in order to discuss the question, "Did Jesus teach the immorality of being rich?" He was arrested on the charge of disorderly conduct and three days later he was sentenced to six months on Blackwells Island. Because of his success at converting the workhouse prisoners there to Socialism, he was transferred to the more isolated Queens County Jail. Upton Sinclair had a letter published in The New York Times urging White's followers to work for his release, and referred to "Bouck White as 'Jesus,' to the Magistrate who convicted him as 'Pilate,' to the Calvary Baptist Church as 'the temple'....

== Creed ==
After he was released, White published Letters from Prison (1915,) which contained his creed:

I believe in God, the Master most mighty, stirrer-up of Heaven and earth. And in Jesus the Carpenter of Nazareth, who was born of proletarian Mary, toiled at the work bench, descended into labor's hell, suffered under Roman tyranny at the hands of Pontius Pilate, was crucified, dead and buried. The Power not ourselves which makes for freedom, he rose again from the dead to be lord of the democratic advance, sworn foe of stagnancy, maker of folk upheavals. I believe in work, the self-respecting toiler, the holiness of beauty, freeborn producers, the communion of comrades, the resurrection of workers, and the industrial commonwealth, the cooperative kingdom eternal."

For desecrating the American flag, even though he claimed it was part of a religious ceremony and several flags from other countries were burned at the same time as a call for international brotherhood, he was again sent to prison in 1916.

== Later life ==
White left for Europe, to either learn more about pottery-making or as a war correspondent. He married Andree Emilie Simon, a 19-year-old girl he brought back to his primitive home in Marlboro, Ulster County, New York. Because he mistreated her, the local residents tarred and feathered him. The marriage was annulled and White left for Vermont in the summer of 1921. He eventually moved to New Scotland, Albany County, New York in the Helderberg Mountains area. With the help of two Swedish brothers, he built by hand a primitive castle out of local limestone in the mid-1930s. He referred to his buildings as "Federalburg" and "The Spirit of the Helderbergs," but local residents called it the "Helderberg Castle."

White made a living selling "Bouckware" pottery with a new glazing technique that required no heat. Fire destroyed his living quarters at the castle in 1940. In 1944 he suffered a stroke that forced him to enter the Home for Aged Men in Menands where he died in 1951.

"Bouck White drifted through the Methodist Episcopal ministry, the Congregational ministry, and a stint as an Episcopalian lay youth worker, before founding the Church of the Social Revolution and exasperating all socialist and ecclesiastical organizations he encountered, descending into notorious eccentricities in the mountains outside Albany, New York."
