= 1908 Republican National Convention =

American political convention

- 1908 presidential election
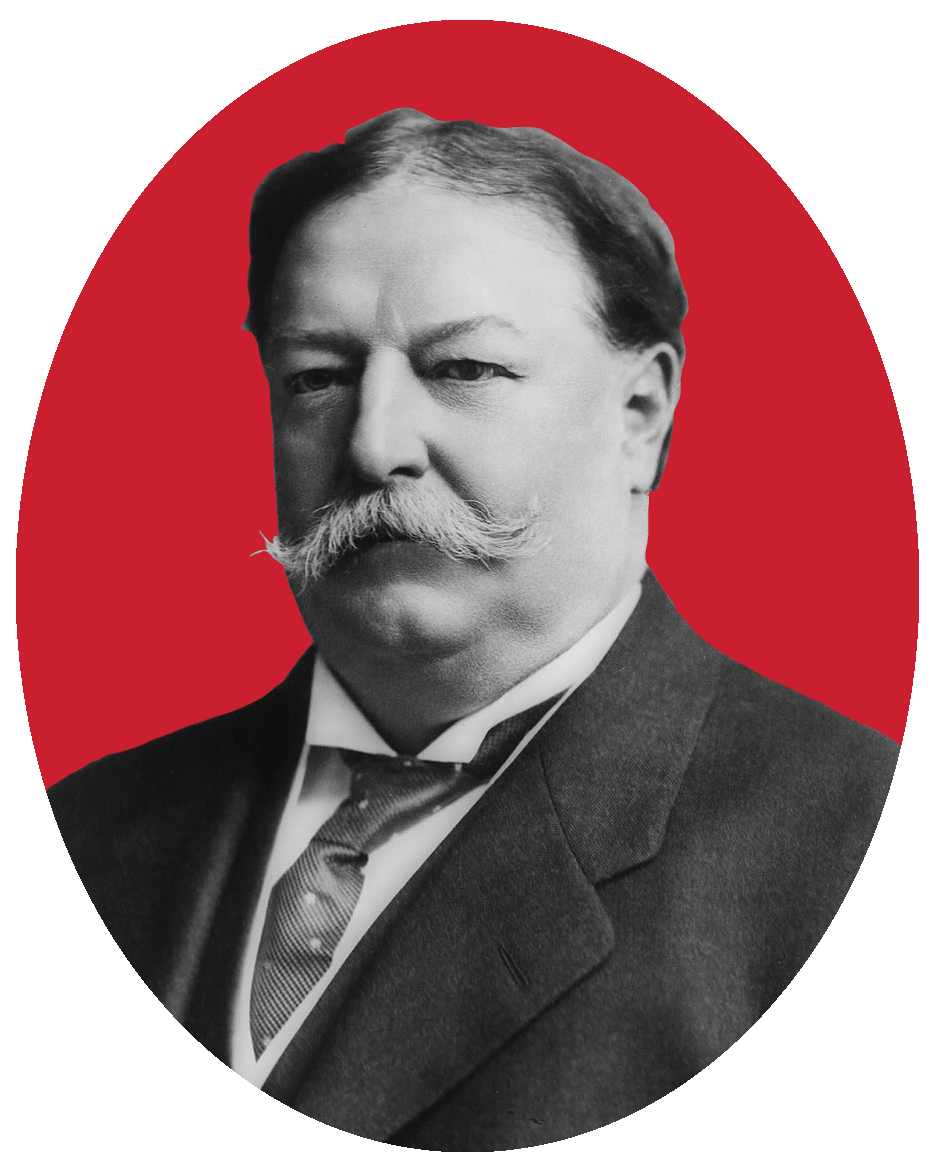
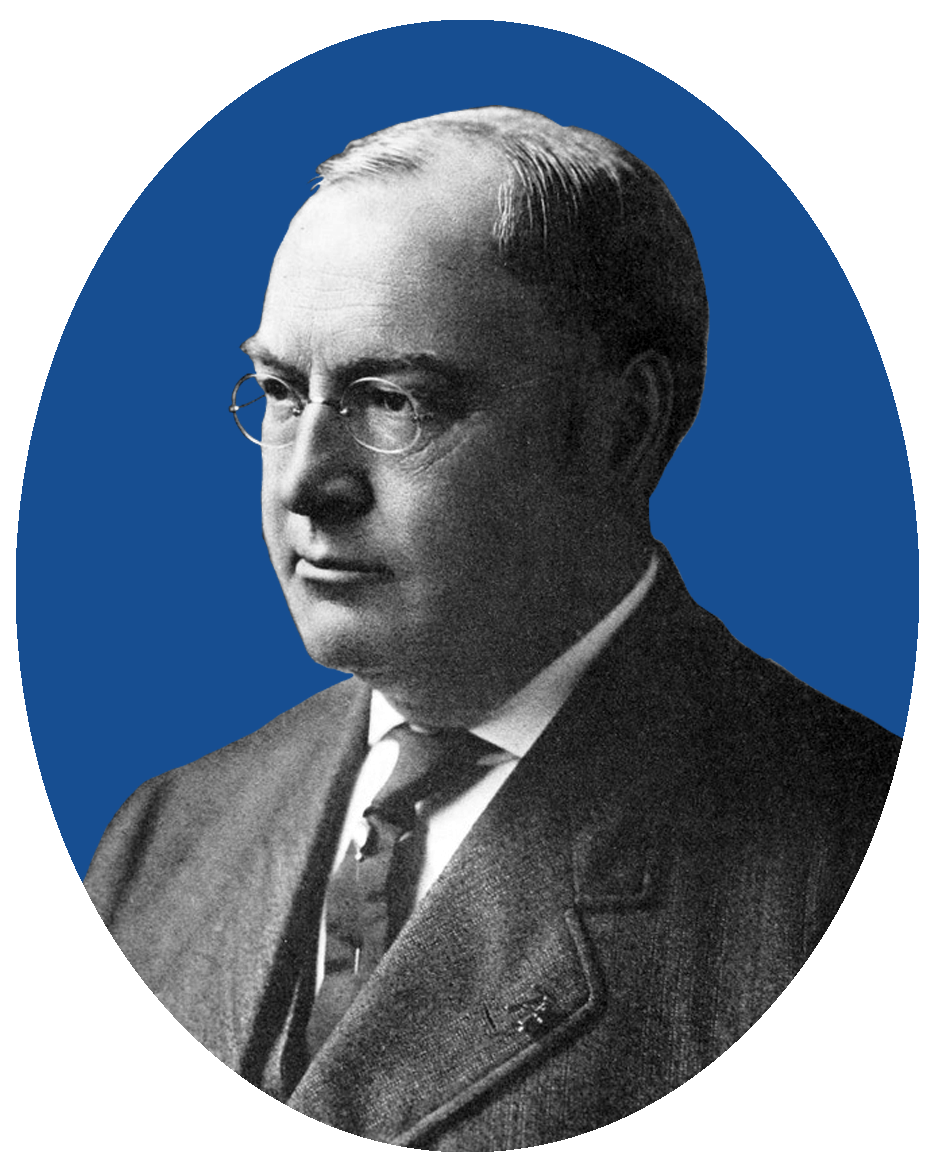
- Nominees; Taft and Sherman

Convention
- Date(s): June 16–19, 1908
- City: Chicago, Illinois
- Venue: Chicago Coliseum
- Chair: Henry C. Lodge
- Keynote speaker: Julius C. Burrows

Candidates
- Presidential nominee: William Howard Taft of Ohio
- Vice-presidential nominee: James S. Sherman of New York

Voting
- Total delegates: 980
- Votes needed for nomination: 491
- Results (president): Taft (OH): 702 (71.63%); Knox (PA): 68 (6.94%); Hughes (NY): 67 (6.84%); Cannon (IL): 58 (5.92%); Fairbanks (IN): 40 (4.08%); La Follette (WI): 25 (2.55%); Foraker (OH): 16 (1.63%); Roosevelt (NY): 3 (0.31%); Abstaining: 1 (0.10%)
- Ballots: 1

The 1908 Republican National Convention was held in Chicago Coliseum, Chicago, Illinois on June 16 to June 19, 1908. It convened to nominate successors to President Theodore Roosevelt and Vice President Charles W. Fairbanks.

U.S. Secretary of War William Howard Taft of Ohio won Roosevelt's endorsement and received the presidential nomination. The convention nominated New York Representative James S. Sherman to be his vice presidential running mate.

== The Platform ==
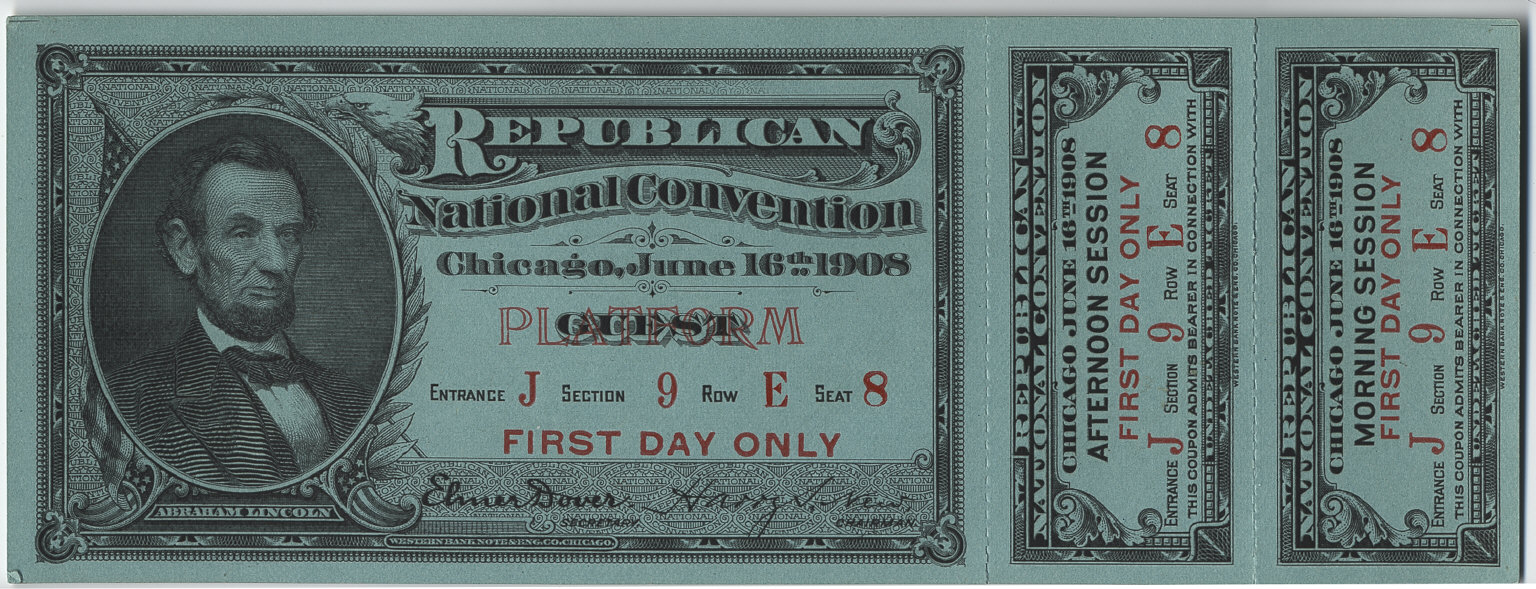
Entrance ticket, featuring an illustration of historic Republican president Abraham Lincoln (who had hailed from the host state of Illinois and been nominated at the 1860 convention held in Chicago)

The Republican platform celebrated the Roosevelt administration's economic policies such as the keeping of the protective tariff, establishment of a permanent currency system (the Federal Reserve), additional government supervision and control over trusts. It championed enforcement of railroad rate laws, giving the Interstate Commerce Commission authority to investigate interstate railroads, and reduction of work hours for railroad workers, as well as general reduction in the work week.

In foreign policy, it supported a buildup of the armed forces, protection of American citizens abroad, extension of foreign commerce, vigorous arbitration and the Hague treaties, a revival of the U.S. Merchant Marine, support of war veterans, self-government for Cuba and the Philippines with citizenship for residents of Puerto Rico.

In other areas, it advocated court reform, creation of a federal Bureau of Mines and Mining, extension of rural mail delivery, environmental conservation, upholding of the rights of African-Americans and the civil service, and greater efficiency in national public health agencies.

The platform lastly expressed pride in U.S. involvement in the building of the Panama Canal, the admission of the New Mexico and Arizona Territories; called for the celebration of the birthday of Abraham Lincoln; and generally deplored the Democratic Party while celebrating the policies of the Republicans. The platform explained the differences between democracy and republicanism in which the Republicans made clear that democracy was leaning towards socialism and republicanism towards individualism.

== Speakers ==
The 1908 Republican National Convention in session at Chicago Coliseum.

The following individuals spoke at the 1908 Republican National Convention. Many spoke with the goal of nominating a specific nominee as this was before the age of the primary and the nominees were all decided at the convention.

As temporary chairman of the convention, Senator Julius C. Burrows of Michigan delivered the convention's opening keynote address.

=== June 16 ===
- Prayer by Rt. Rev. P.J. Muldoon V.G.
- Julius C. Burrows, senator from Michigan

=== June 17 ===
- Prayer by Rev. William Otis Waters
- Henry Cabot Lodge, senator from Massachusetts

=== June 18 ===
- Prayer by Rev. Dr. John Wesley Hill
- George Henry Williams, former U.S. Attorney General
- Henry Sherman Boutell of Illinois, lawyer and diplomat
- Joseph W. Fordney, congressman from Michigan
- Frank Hanly, governor of Indiana
- Charles A. Bookwalter, mayor of Indianapolis
- Stewart L. Woodford, former Congressman and judge of New York
- Theodore E. Burton, congressman from Ohio
- George A. Knight, attorney and businessman
- C. B. M'Coy, Ohio factory owner
- W. O. Emory, young black delegate from Macon, Georgia
- Robert S. Murphy, lieutenant governor of Pennsylvania
- James Scarlet, prominent attorney from Danville, Pennsylvania
- Henry F. Cochems, politician and former Wisconsin Badgers football star
- Charles A. A. McGee, author of "The Truth About Money" from Wisconsin

=== June 19 ===
- Prayer by Rabbi Tobias Schanfarber
- Timothy L. Woodruff, businessman and former politician
- Joseph Gurney Cannon, speaker of the House
- Augustus E. Willson, governor of Kentucky
- Henry Cabot Lodge –Cabot's second time speaking during the convention
- Chase Osborn of Michigan
- James Brownlow Yellowley, Mississippi state legislator
- Thomas N. McCarter, former attorney general of New Jersey
- William Warner, senator from Missouri
- Julius C. Burrows senator from Michigan

== Presidential nomination ==
=== Presidential candidates ===
War Secretary
William Howard Taft
of Ohio

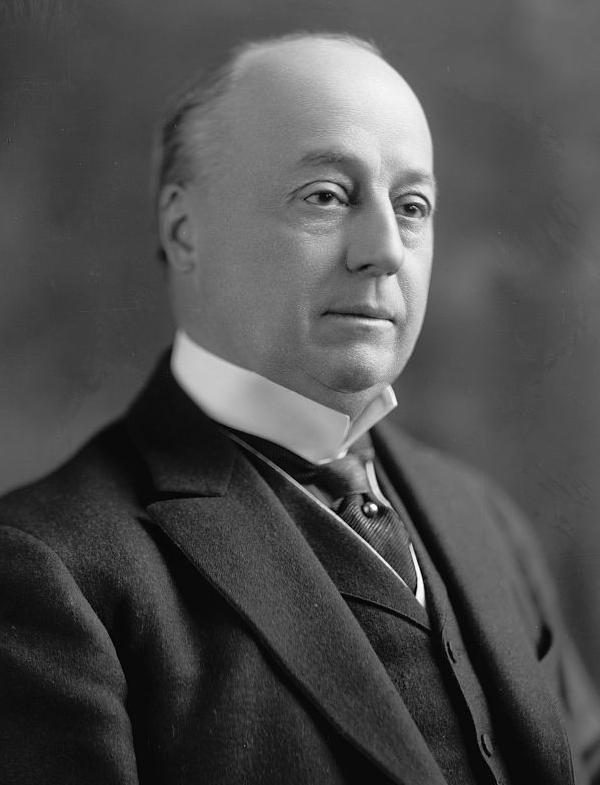
Senator
Philander C. Knox
of Pennsylvania

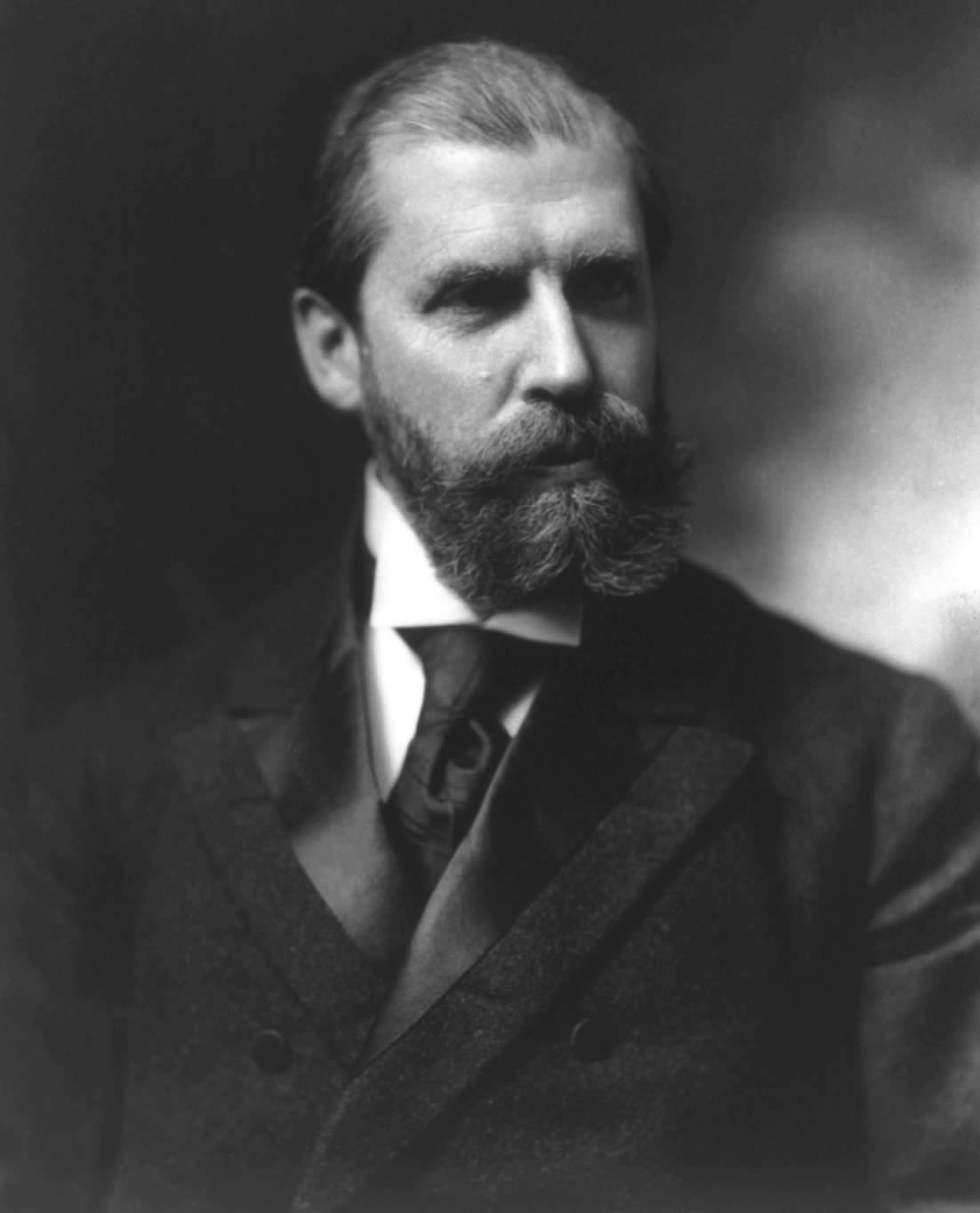
Governor
Charles Evans Hughes
of New York

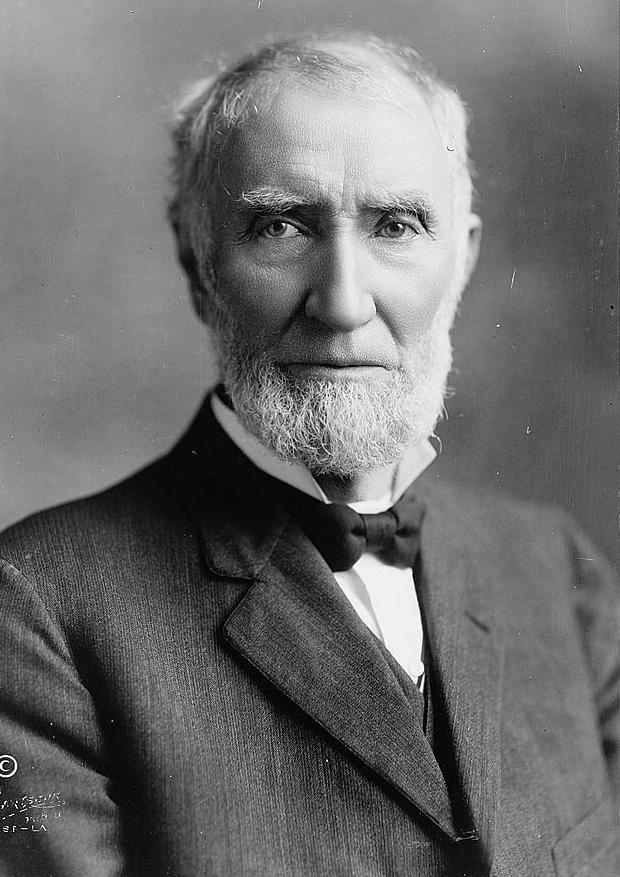
Speaker
Joseph G. Cannon
of Illinois

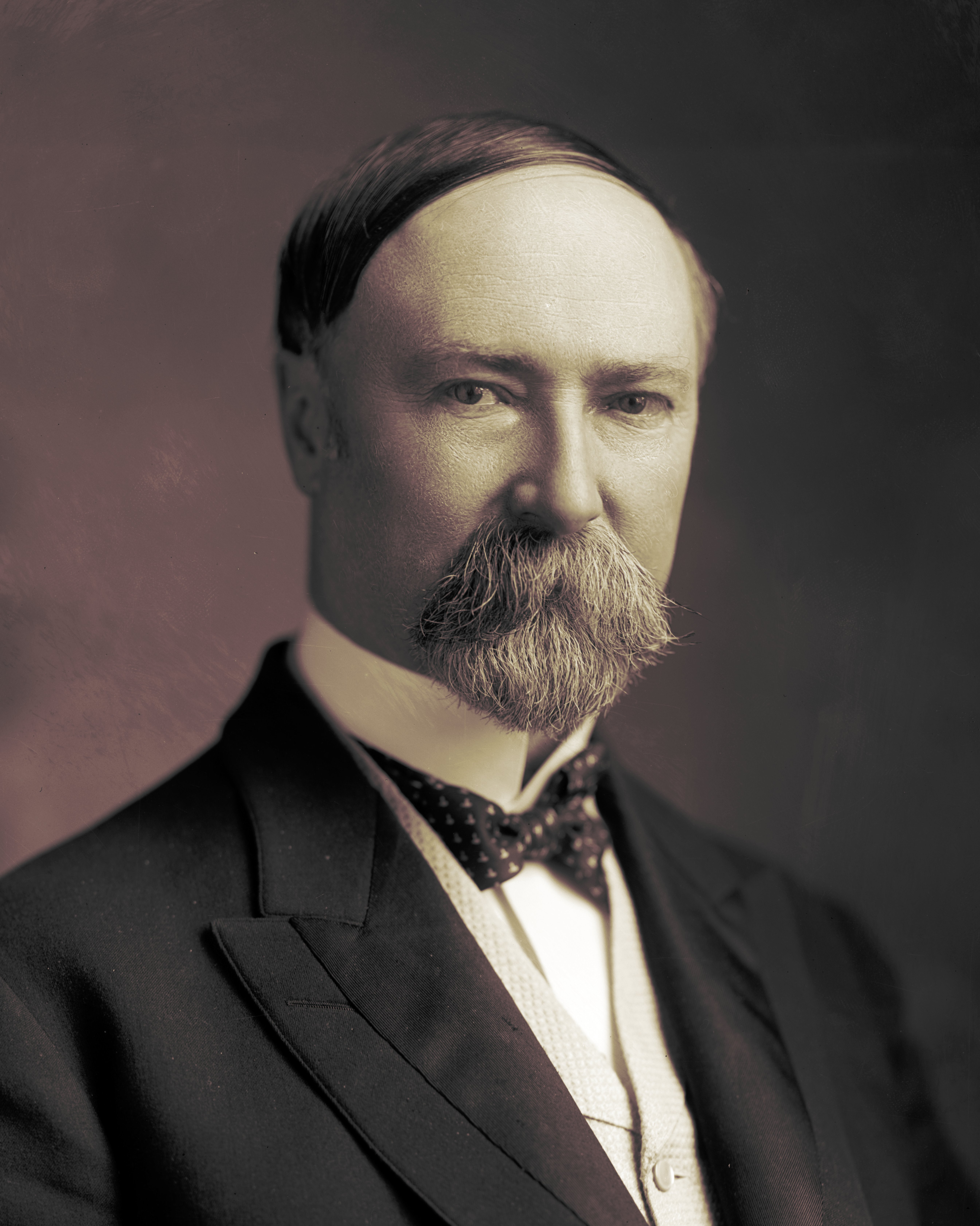
Vice President
Charles W. Fairbanks
of Indiana

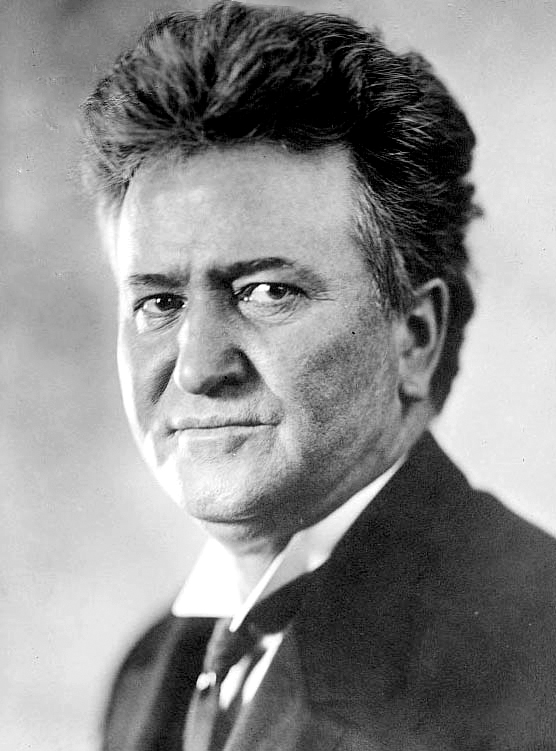
Senator
Robert M. La Follette
of Wisconsin

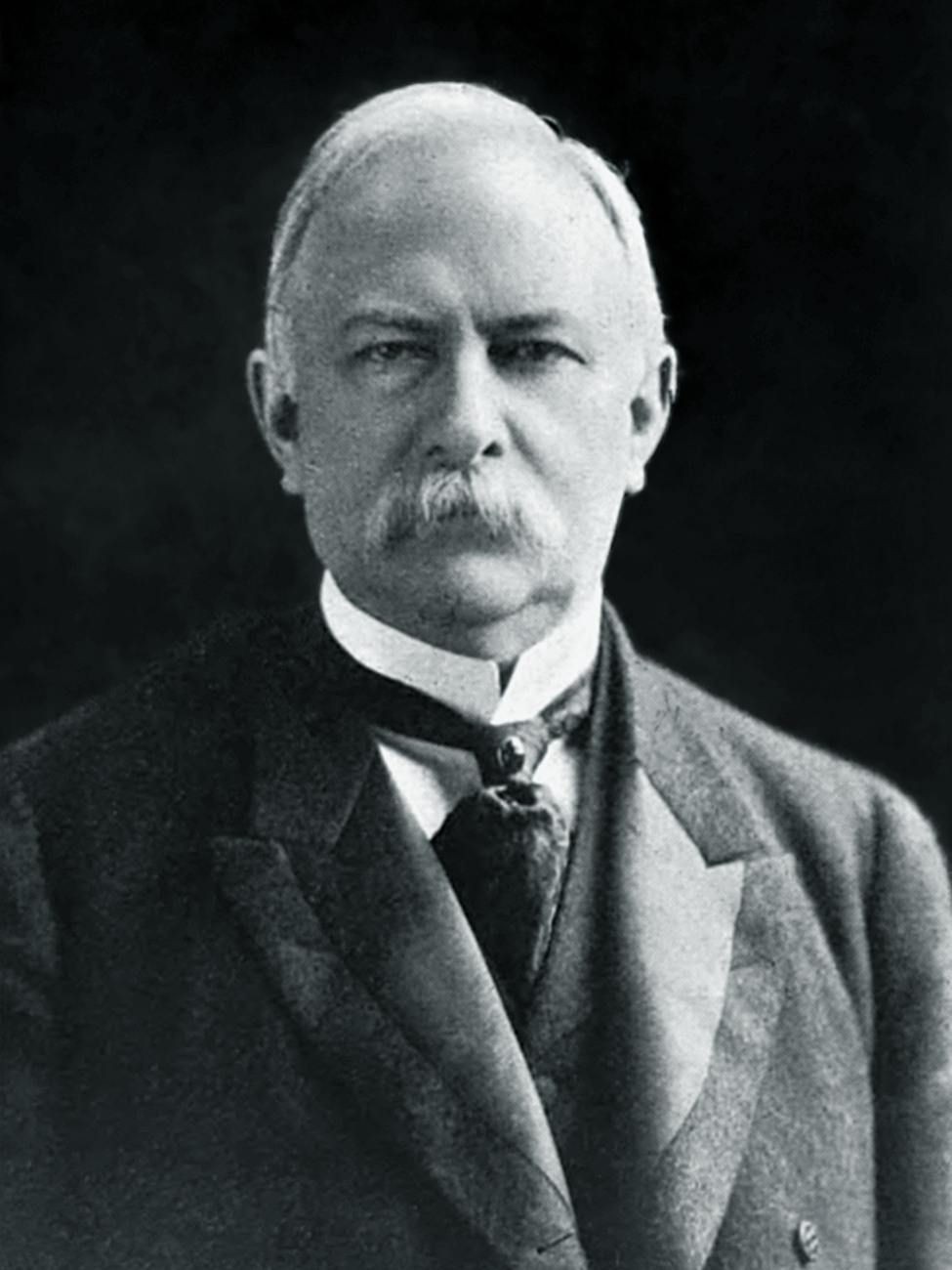
Senator
Joseph B. Foraker
of Ohio

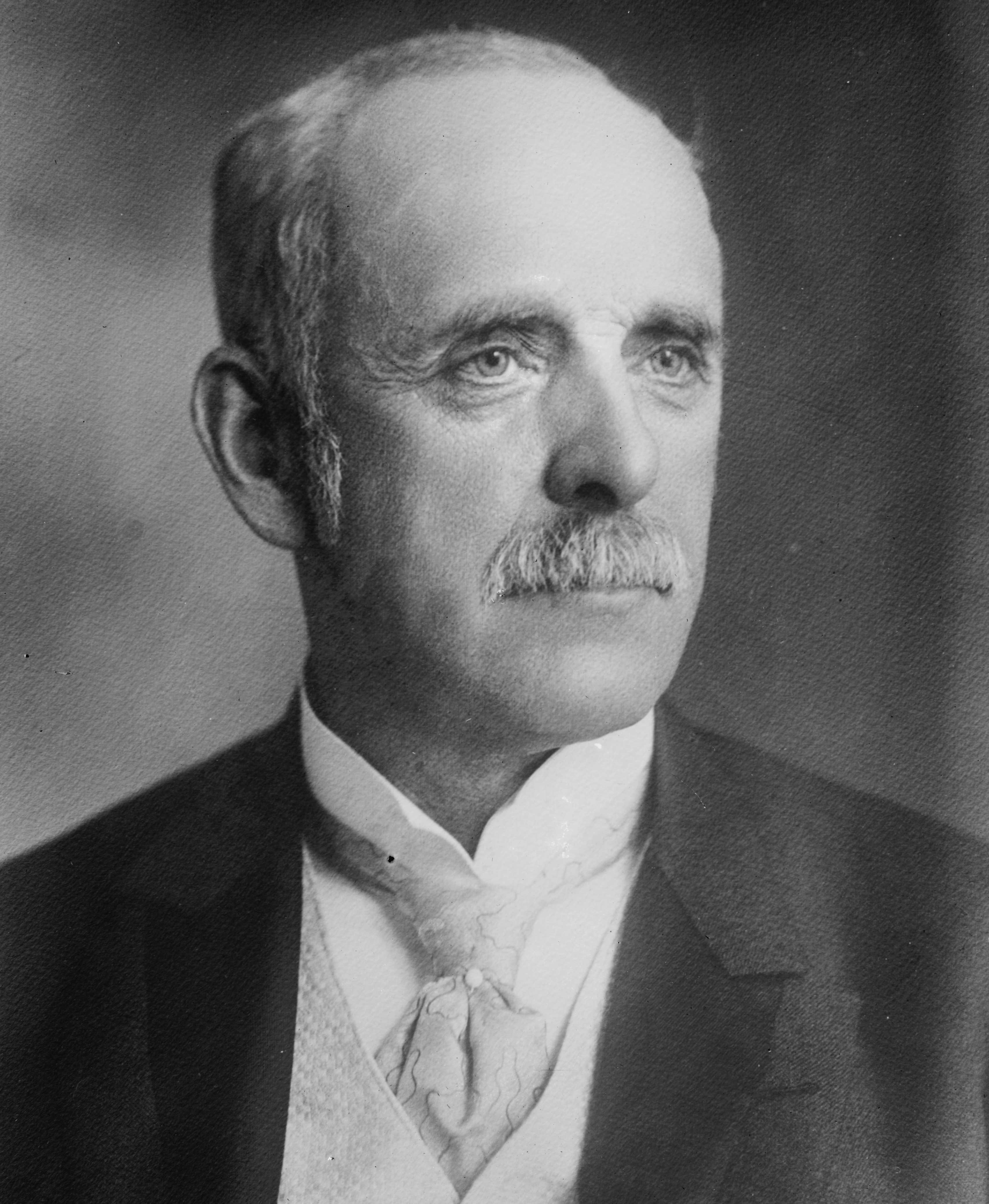
Former
Treasury Secretary
L. M. Shaw
of Iowa
(Not Nominated)

The Republicans faced difficulties selecting a successor to Roosevelt. Elihu Root was favored by Roosevelt, but his age and alignment with corporations made him unpalatable. Prior to the convention, Vice President Charles W. Fairbanks and New York Governor Charles Evans Hughes both seemed like plausible nominees, but Roosevelt was determined to pick his own successor. U.S. Senator Joseph B. Foraker sought the nomination and was financed by Winthrop M. Crane and Henry Cabot Lodge.

Roosevelt supported Secretary of War William Howard Taft. Entering the convention, Taft, buoyed by the support of the popular Roosevelt, was virtually assured of the nomination. U.S. Senator Jacob H. Gallinger was among the supporters of a movement to stop Taft's nomination. Taft won the presidential nomination on the first ballot, overcoming Fairbanks and the other favorite son candidates.

=== Withdrew Before Convention ===
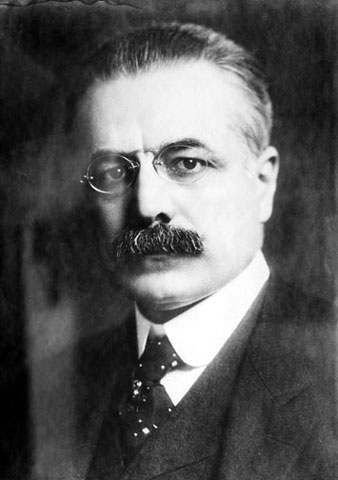
Treasury Secretary
George B. Cortelyou
of New York

=== Declined to Seek Nomination ===
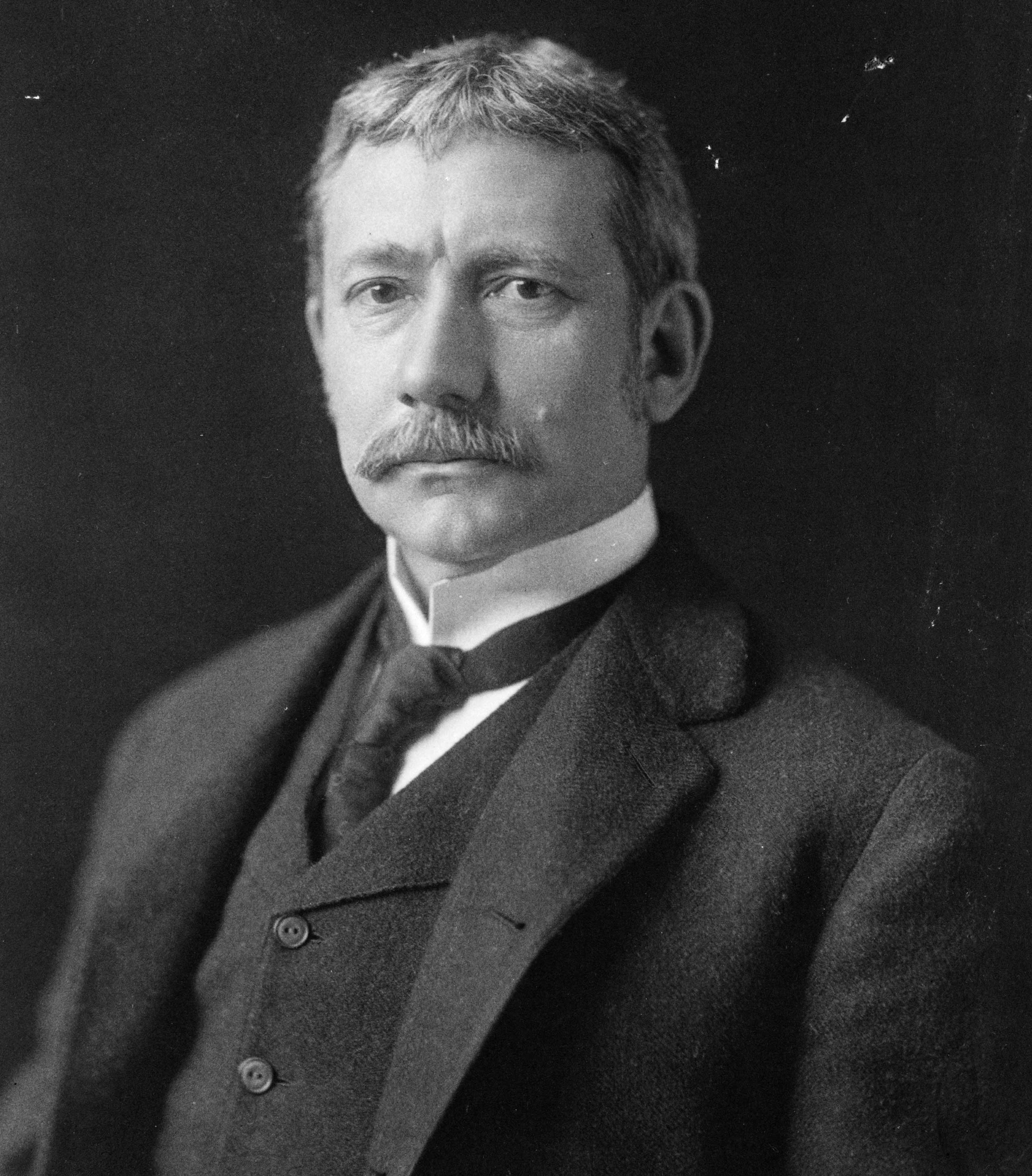
State Secretary
Elihu Root
of New York

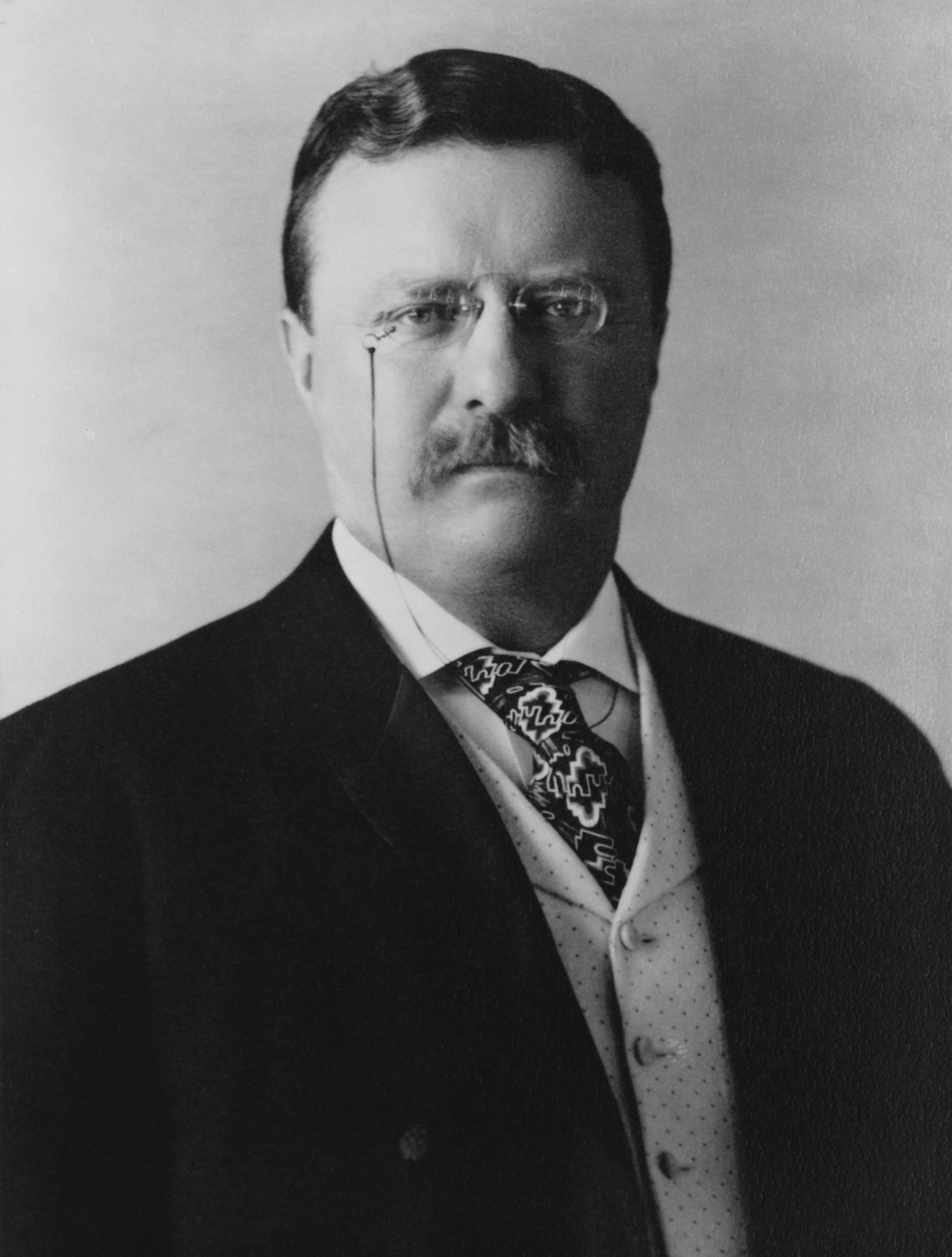
President
Theodore Roosevelt
of New York

Presidential Balloting
Candidate	1st	Unanimous
Taft	702	980
Knox	68	
Hughes	67	
Cannon	58	
Fairbanks	40	
La Follette	25	
Foraker	16	
Roosevelt	3	
Not Voting	1	

Presidential Balloting / 3rd Day of Convention (June 18, 1908)

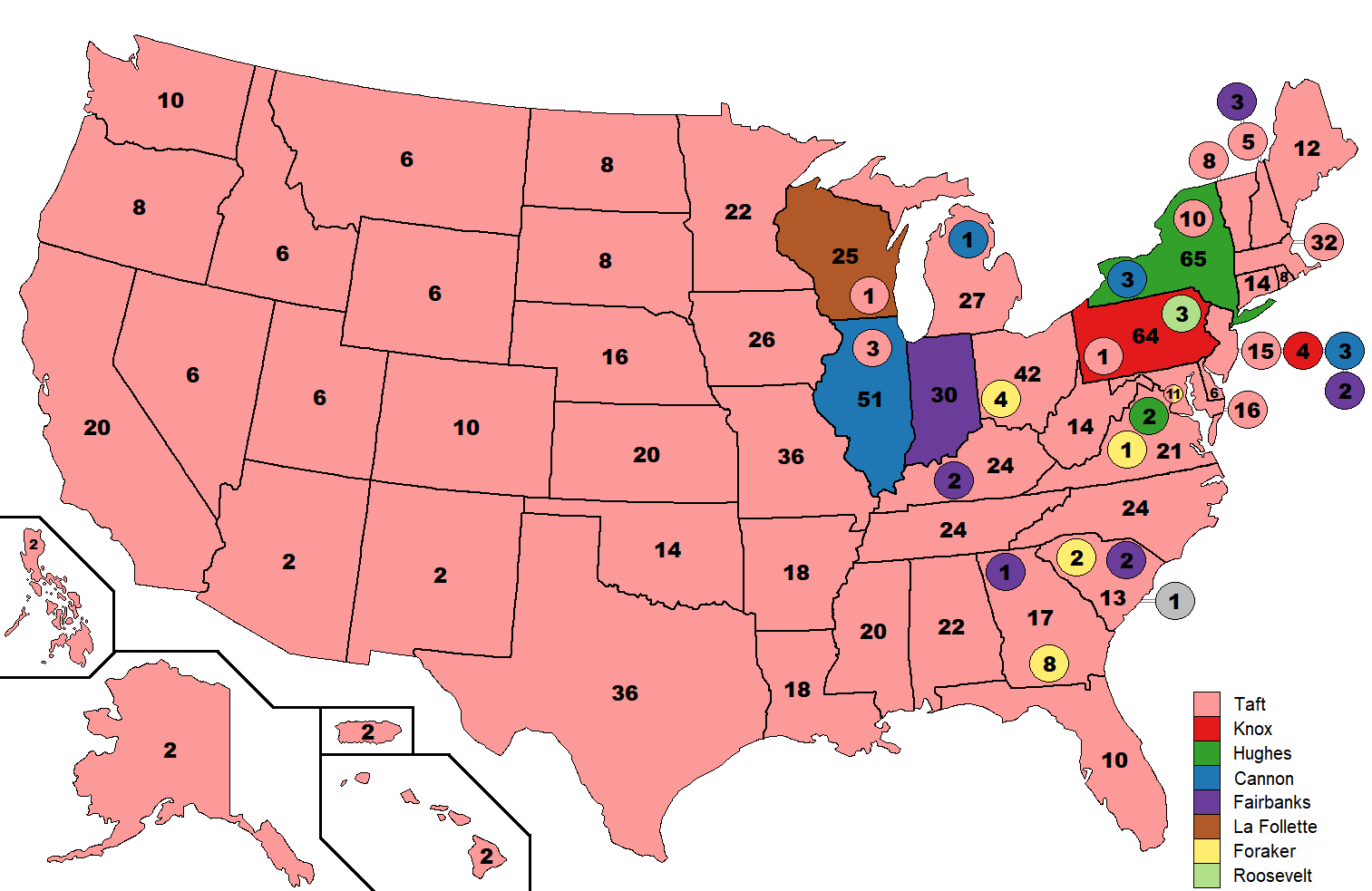
1st Presidential Ballot

== Vice Presidential nomination ==
=== Vice Presidential candidates ===
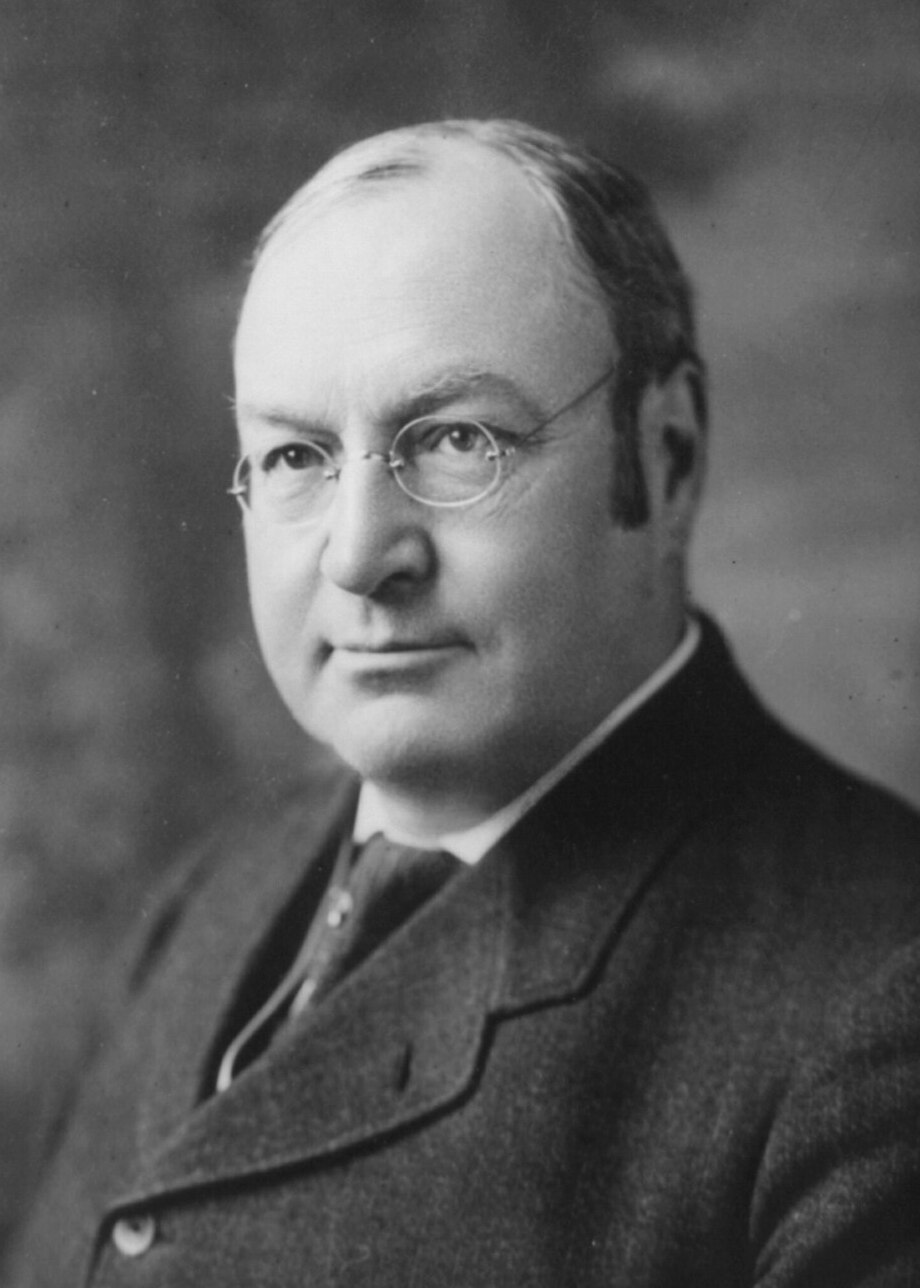
Representative
James S. Sherman
of New York

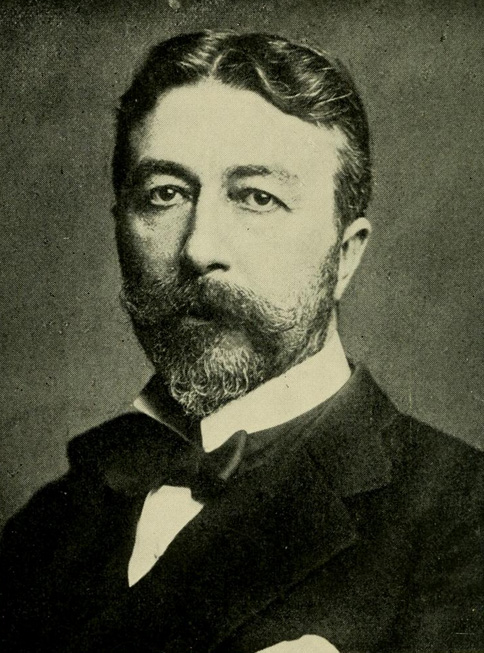
Former Governor Franklin Murphy
of New Jersey

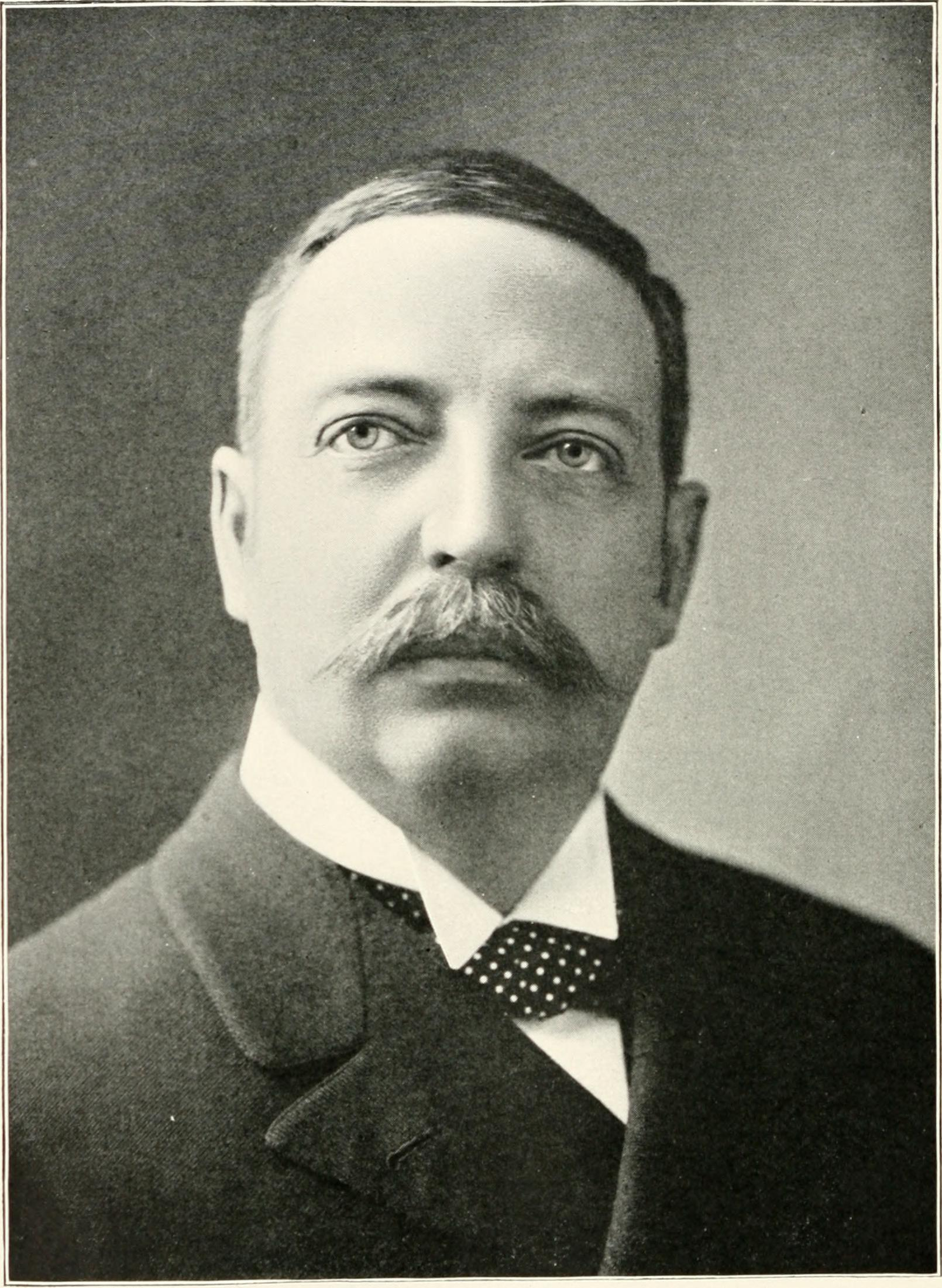
Governor
Curtis Guild, Jr.
of Massachusetts

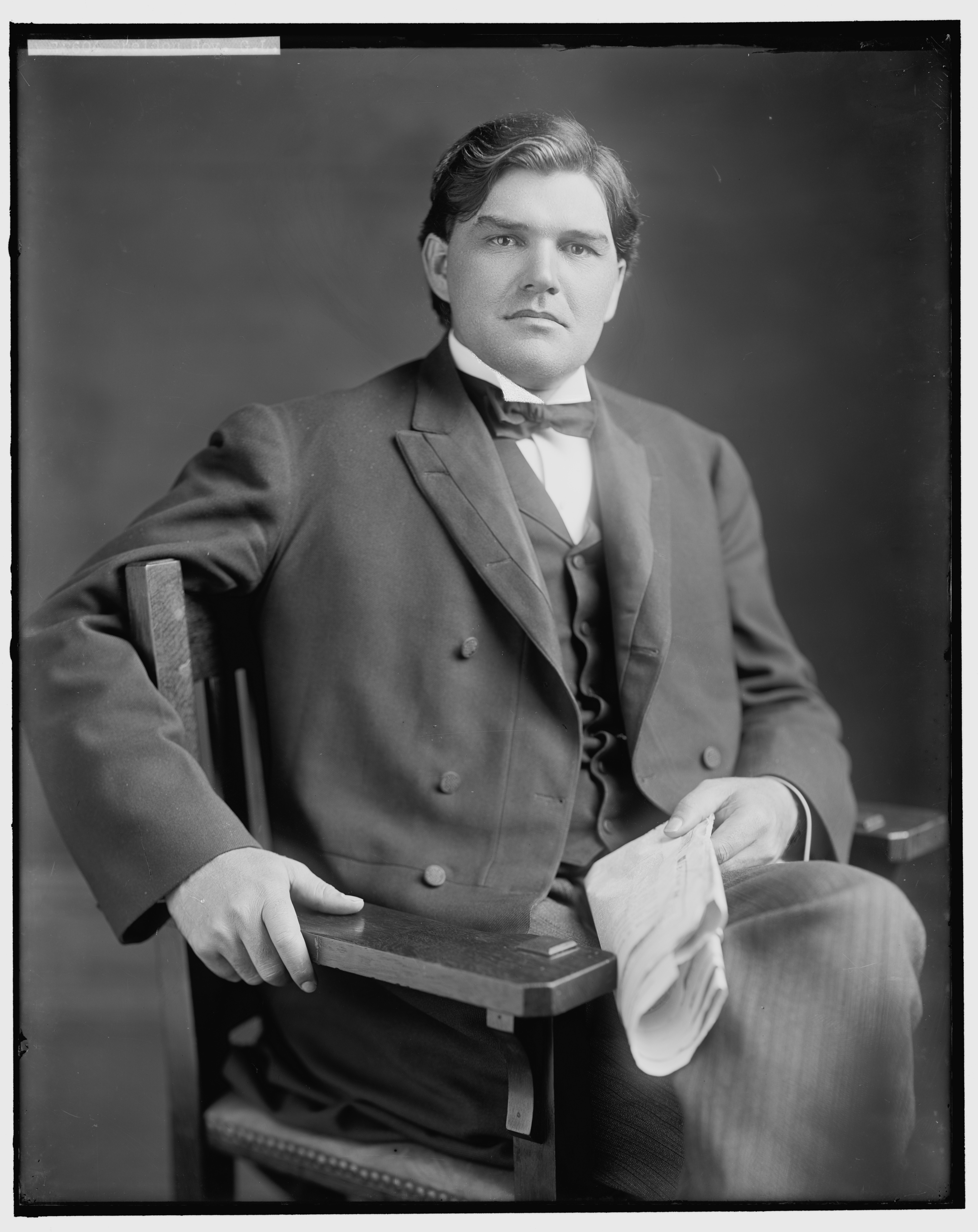
Governor
George L. Sheldon
of Nebraska
(Not Nominated)

Taft preferred a progressive running mate such as Indiana Senator Albert Beveridge or Iowa Senator Jonathan Dolliver, but Representative James S. Sherman of New York had the support of Speaker Joseph Gurney Cannon and the New York delegation, as well as western support from Senator Charles Curtis of Kansas. Sherman was a fairly conservative Republican who was nonetheless acceptable to the more progressive wing of the party. Sherman won the vice presidential nomination on the first ballot, taking 816 of the 979 votes cast. Former New Jersey Governor Franklin Murphy received 77 votes while Massachusetts Governor Curtis Guild, Jr. received 75 votes, with the remaining votes going to Governor George L. Sheldon of Nebraska and Vice President Charles Fairbanks.

=== Declined to Seek Nomination ===
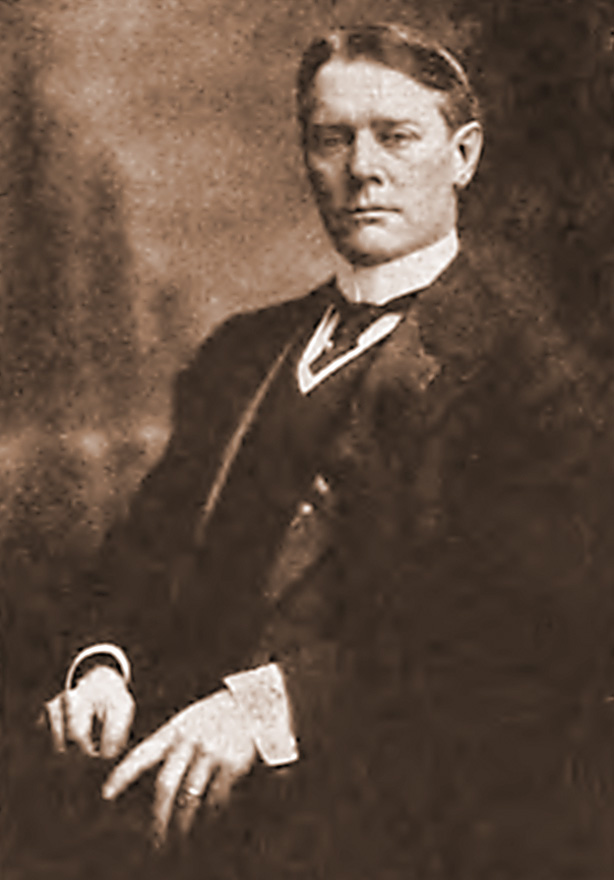
Senator
Albert J. Beveridge
of Indiana

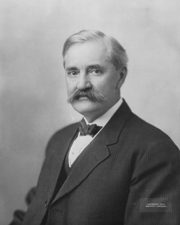
Governor
Albert B. Cummins
of Iowa

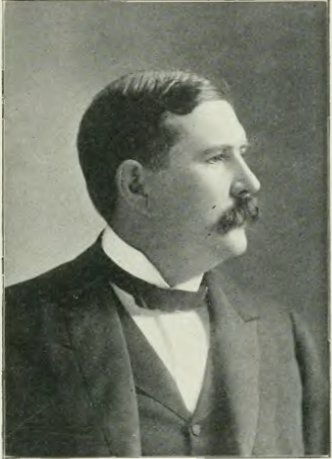
Senator
Jonathan P. Dolliver
of Iowa

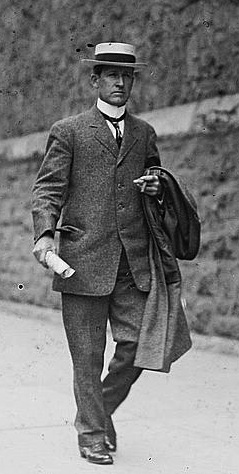
Attorney General
Herbert S. Hadley
of Missouri

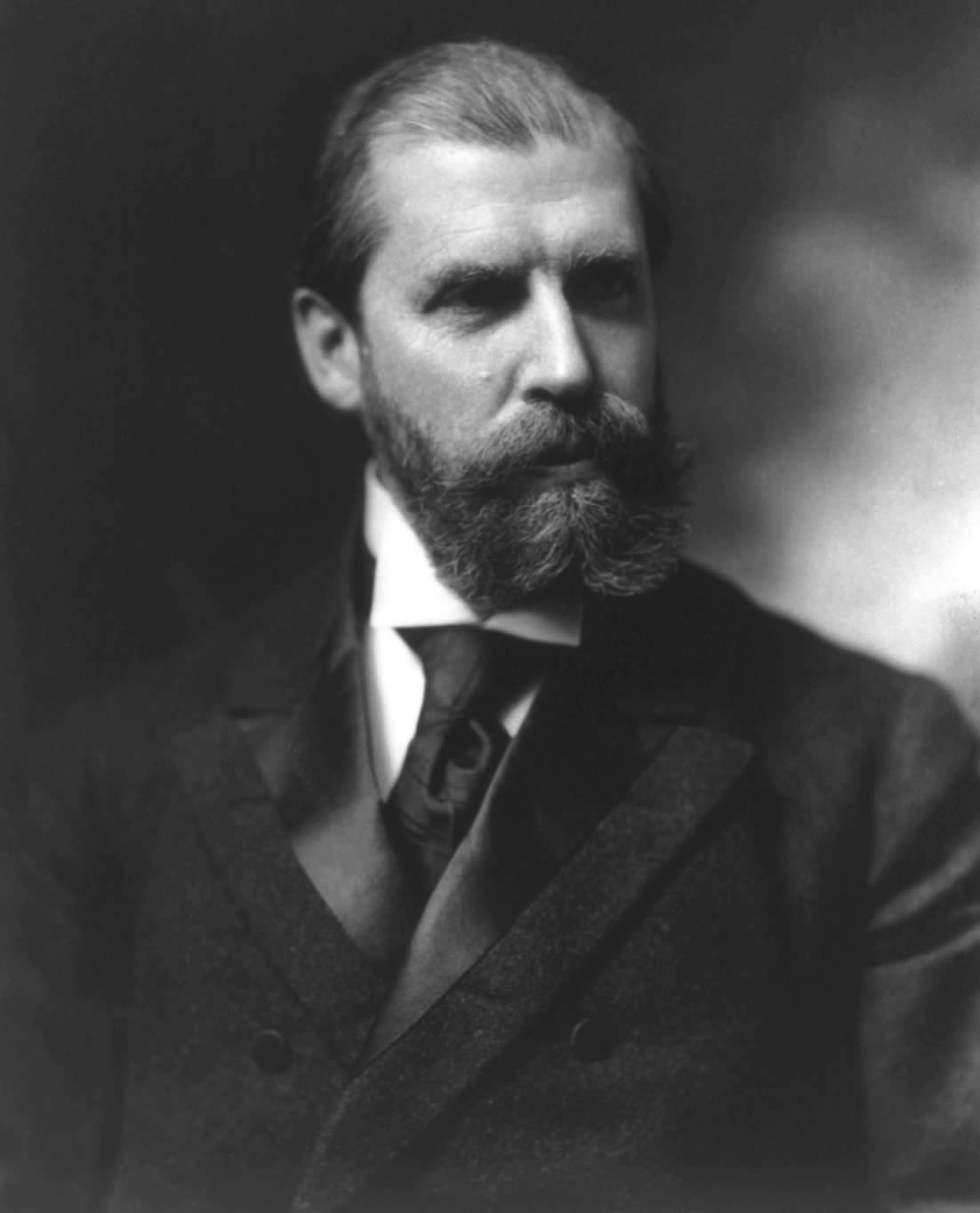
Governor
Charles E. Hughes
of New York

Vice Presidential Balloting
Candidate	1st	Unanimous
Sherman	816	980
Murphy	77	
Guild	75	
Sheldon	10	
Fairbanks	1	
Not Voting	1	

Vice Presidential Balloting / 4th Day of Convention (June 19, 1908)

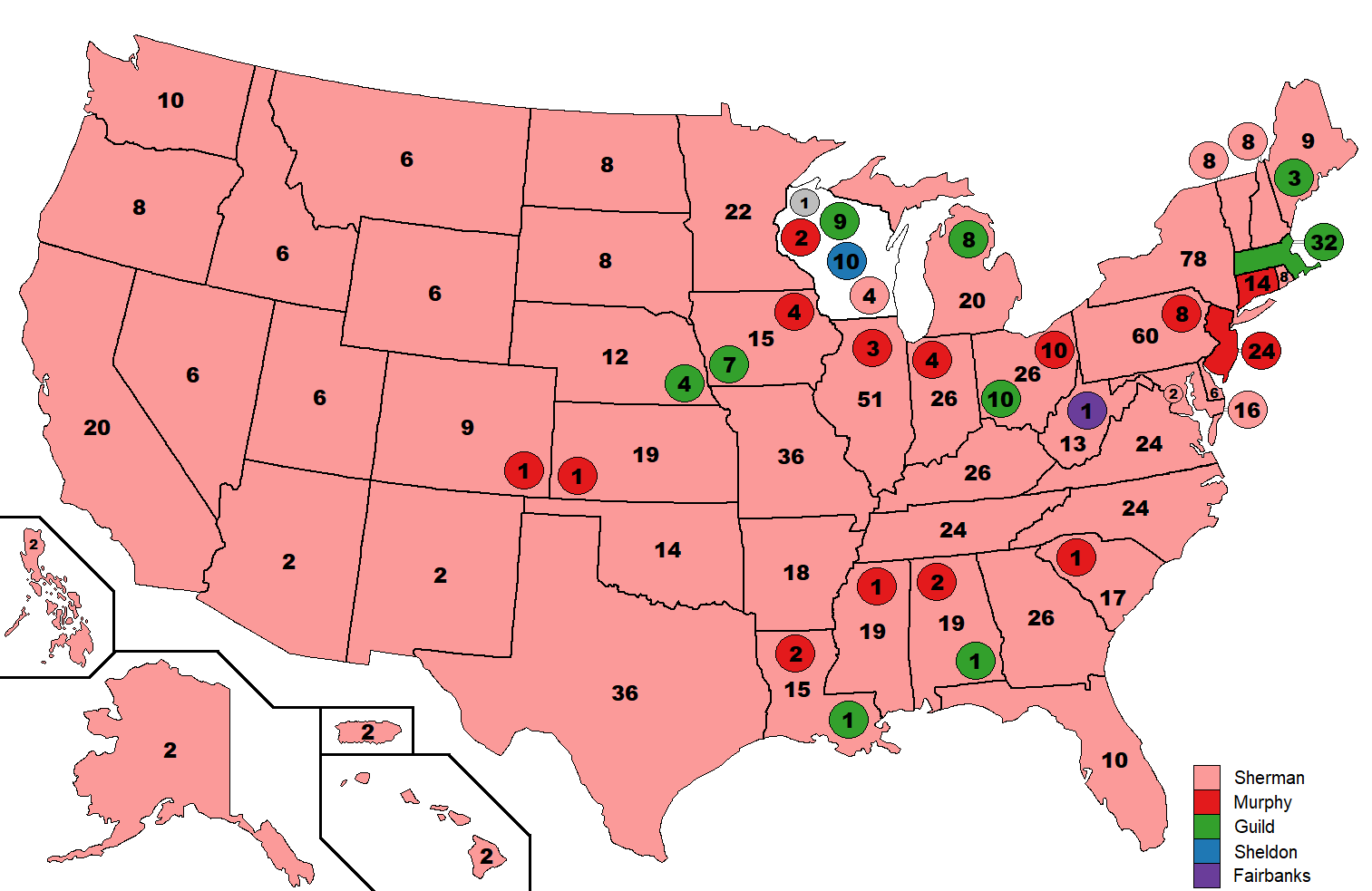
1st
Vice Presidential Ballot

== See also ==
- History of the United States Republican Party
- List of Republican National Conventions
- United States presidential nominating convention
- 1908 United States presidential election
- 1908 Democratic National Convention

== Works cited ==
- Mowry, George (1960). Theodore Roosevelt and the Progressive Movement. University of Wisconsin Press.

Preceded by 1904; Chicago, Illinois	Republican National Conventions	Succeeded by 1912; Chicago, Illinois
