= James Brownlow Yellowley =

American lawyer, farmer and politician

James Brownlow Yellowley (October 17, 1848 – 1914) was an American lawyer, farmer, and state legislator in Mississippi.

He was from Greenville, North Carolina the son of James Burroughs Yellowley and the grandson of Captain Edward Yellowley. His father James Burroughs Yellowley founded Ridgeland, Mississippi. He attended the University of North Carolina from 1866-1868. He lived in Madison, Mississippi.

In 1875, Henry R. Smith wrote about a meeting of Republicans that reached an agreement with Democrats in Madison County for a compromise ticket for the coming election which included Yellowley as a representative. He was elected to represent Madison County as a Democrat in the Mississippi House of Representatives in 1875 for the session starting 1876. He was the Republican nominee for Lieutenant Governor in 1881 and for a congressional seat in 1884. He was a spokesman for a grange.

Yellowley chaired a committee investigating the conduct of T. W. Cardozo. He was a trustee at Tougaloo College.

He attended the 1908 Republican National Convention.

His extended family has been written about. He grew grapes, strawberries, and asparagus. He had a son Edward C. Yellowley (1873–1962) who became an enforcement agent for the Internal Revenue Service. He was named after Edward Clements Yellowley who was J. B. Yellowley's uncle.
