= World's Court League =

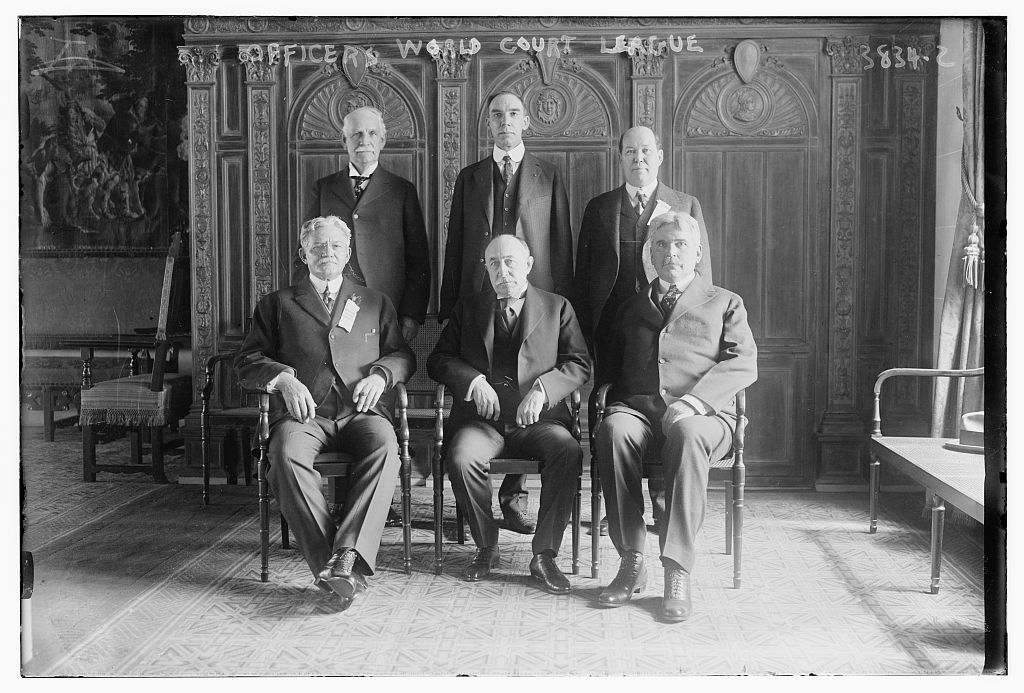
World Court League in 1916. Seated from left to right are: Emerson McMillin, John Hays Hammond, and Nicholas Murray Butler. Standing from left to right are: Henry Clews, Henry Riggs Rathbone, and John Wesley Hill

The World Court League was formed on December 30, 1915, with John Hays Hammond as president. They lobbied for the formation of the International Court of Justice.

== 1915 personnel and first meeting attendees ==
- William H. Taft, honorary president. He resigned in 1917 because he was a member of the League to Enforce Peace.
- John Hays Hammond, president.
- Emerson McMillin, vice president.
- Henry Clews, treasurer.
- Dr. John Wesley Hill, general secretary and editor of The World Court
- Jeremiah Whipple Jenks, attendee.
- W. E. Knox of New York City, New York, director.
- Oscar S. Strauss, attendee.
- W. W. Wilson of Chicago, Illinois, director.
- Augustus Busch of St. Louis, Missouri, director.
- Alton Brooks Parker, director.
- James G. Beemer, attendee.
- Samuel C. Dutton of Hartsdale, New York, attendee.
- E. C. Stokes of Trenton, New Jersey, director.

== 1917 personnel ==
- Samuel T. Dutton, general secretary, 1917

== 1919 personnel ==
- Charles Lathrop Pack, president
- Nicholas Murray Butler, president of the international council.
- Albert Shaw (World's Court League).
- Henry Clews, treasurer.
- Samuel T. Dutton.
- Frederick E. Farnsworth.
- Charles Herbert Levermore, corresponding secretary.
- Frank Chapin Bray, editor.

== Presidents ==
- John Hays Hammond 1914 to 1915.
- Charles Lathrop Pack 1919.
