= John Wesley Hill =

American minister, activist, and author

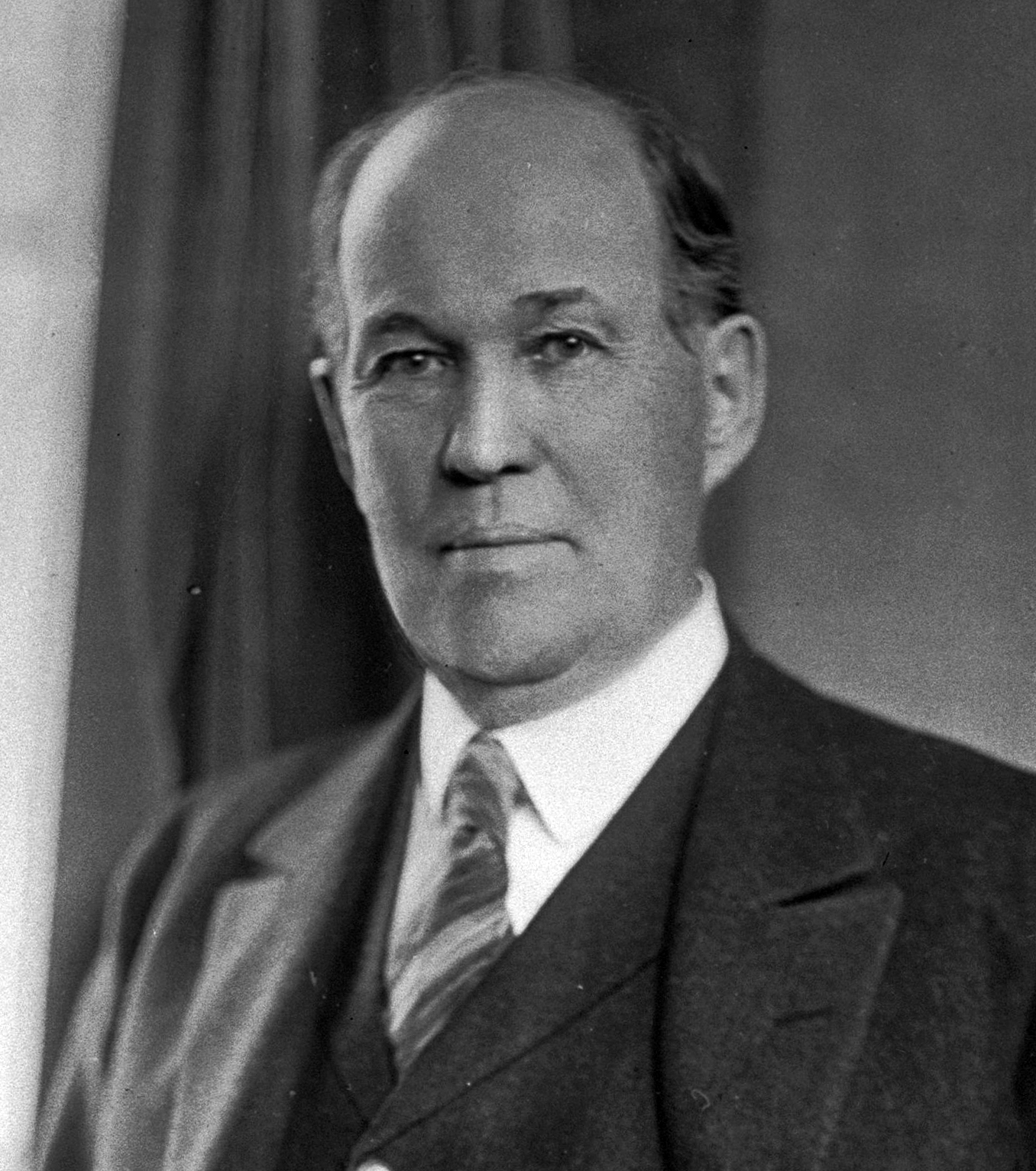
John Wesley Hill

John Wesley Hill (May 8, 1863 – October 12, 1936) was an American Methodist minister, political activist, author, and the chancellor of Lincoln Memorial University in Harrogate, Tennessee, from 1916 to 1936.

== Early life ==
Hill was born on May 8, 1863, in Kalida, Ohio. Hill's father was John Wesley Hill (1831–1913). Hill's mother was Elizabeth Hughes Hill (1838–1926). Hill attended Ohio Northern University and then took classes at the Methodist Boston Theological Seminary.

== Pastoral career ==
While still taking classes Hill became the pastor of a church in Eggleston Square in Boston. He went on to lead churches in Ogden, Utah; Helena, Montana; and Minneapolis, where he organized and built the Fowler Episcopal Methodist Church. He went on to positions in Fostoria, Ohio, and Harrisburg, Pennsylvania, where he was appointed chaplain to the Pennsylvania state senate. Around 1905 he moved to the Janes United Methodist Church in Brooklyn, and then to the Metropolitan Temple at 7th Avenue and West 13th Street in New York City.

== Politics ==
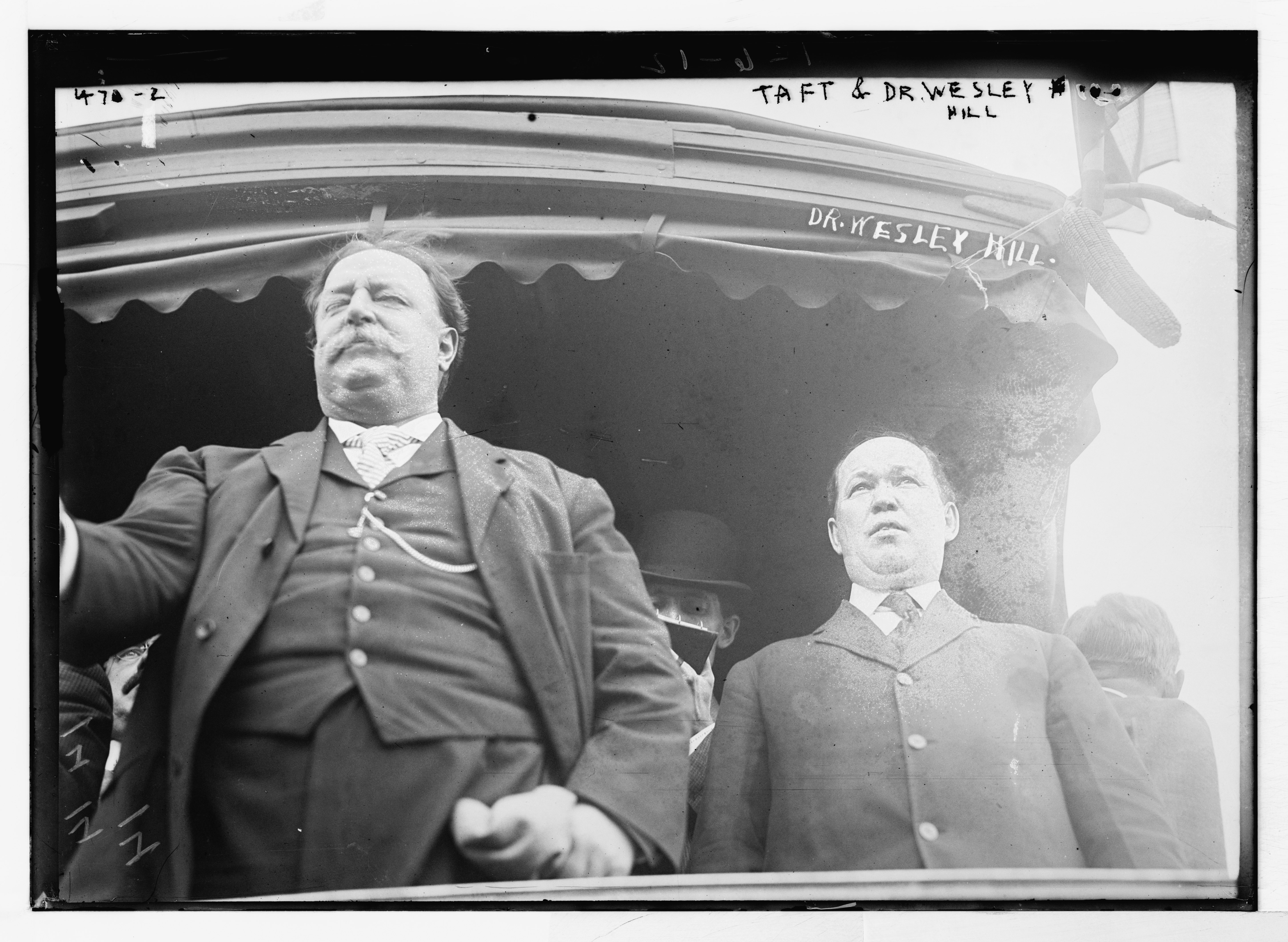
Hill (right) campaigning with William Howard Taft in 1908

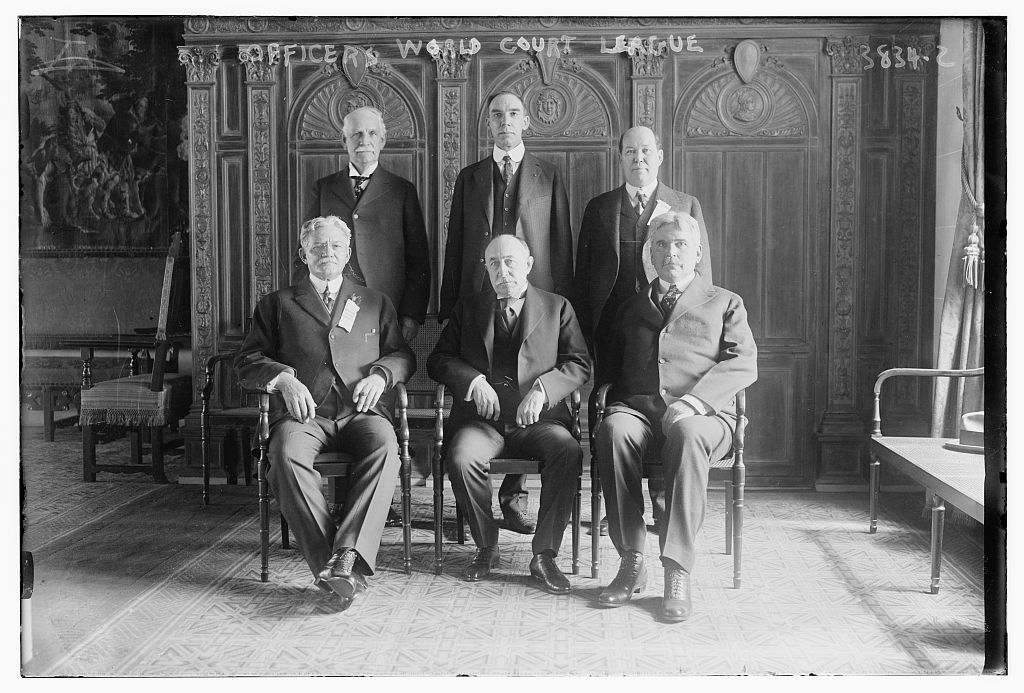
World's Court League in 1916. Seated from left to right are: Emerson McMillin, John Hays Hammond, and unknown. Standing from left to right are: unknown, Henry Riggs Rathbone, and John Wesley Hill

Hill was known for mixing politics and religion, campaigning for example with William H. Taft in 1908. In 1927 he touted the campaign of Illinois governor Frank Orren Lowden for the Republican nomination for president.

Hill was also active in civic organizations. In the 1910s Hill was a vice-president of the American Civic Association. During World War I Hill was involved with several organizations campaigning for peace and world governance, serving as general secretary of the World's Court League 1915-6 (and editor of their publication, The World's Court) and president of the International Peace Forum. Hill published through the Peace Forum a debate he participated in on May 7, 1913, with Dr. Bouck White on the question "Resolved: That socialism is a peril to the state and the church" (with Hill affirming the proposition). Inez Milholland was the moderator.

== Academic career ==
Hill was the chancellor of Lincoln Memorial University in Harrogate, Tennessee, from 1916 to 1936.

Hill wrote Twin City Methodism: A History of the Methodist Episcopal Church in Minneapolis and St. Paul, Minn. (1895), Abraham Lincoln: Man of God (1920), and If Lincoln Were Here (1925).

== Personal life ==
Hill's wife was Sally Harrison Hill.

Hill was accused and sued in 1916 for $100,000 for "breach of promise" damages by Lucille Covington as she claimed Rev. John Wesley Hill told her he was a widower and began a relationship with the promise of future marriage. She reports she later discovered he was married with children and he had no intentions of marrying her.

Hill died on October 12, 1936, at the Commodore Hotel in Manhattan, New York City.

== Legacy ==
Some of his papers are archived at Columbia University.

The John Wesley Hill Building at Ohio Northern University was named after Hill's father, at Hill's suggestion.
