= Briarcliff–Peekskill Parkway =

Highway in New York State

The parkway at Ryder Road in Ossining, pictured in 2026

The Briarcliff–Peekskill Parkway is a partially limited-access highway in Westchester County, New York. It extends for just less than six miles (9.7 km) from the Saw Mill River Parkway in Hawthorne to U.S. Route 9 (US 9) in Ossining. The highway travels through Briarcliff Manor and Ossining, first traveling beside the Taconic State Parkway before then turning west toward the Hudson River. After winding through the suburbs of Briarcliff Manor, the highway turns northward once again in Ossining to join US 9 where the Croton Expressway begins. The entire highway is concurrent with New York State Route 9A (NY 9A) and is concurrent with NY 100 between its southern end and the turn away from the Taconic, where NY 100 continues north toward Millwood and Yorktown Heights. Although it has parkway in its name, the highway allows commercial traffic, unlike most roads with the name in New York state.

Construction of the highway began in the early 1930s and was opened on September 4, 1933, originally as New York State Route 404 The designation was changed to NY 9A on January 1, 1949.

== Route description ==
The highway begins in Hawthorne at the junction between NY 9A and NY 100 where NY 100 joins NY 9A going northbound. After crossing under the Saw Mill River Parkway, the highway has a southbound-only connection ramp from NY 9A to the southbound Saw Mill Parkway. The Briarcliff–Peekskill Parkway now parallels the Taconic State Parkway and has an exit at NY 117 which can be used to access Pace University, Rockefeller State Park, and Pleasantville. The highway then has another southbound only exit, this time to the southbound Taconic State Parkway. There is also an entry ramp from the northbound Taconic (exit 5). The highway begins to veer away from the Taconic as it approaches the junction where NY 100 leaves the Briarcliff–Peekskill Parkway and continues north toward Millwood and Yorktown Heights. The highway then bears left and has its first at-grade junction with N State Road. It then bears right and parallels Pleasantville Road. The highway soon has another junction with Chappaqua Road, followed by a right-in/right-out junction with Croton Avenue. The Briarcliff–Peekskill Parkway continues lightly winding through the suburbs as there is another right-in/right-out junction with Ryder Road. Soon after, the highway turns westward sharply and has an at-grade junction with Croton Dam Road, and then a westbound only right-in/right-out junction with Hawkes Avenue. Another at-grade junction follows at Stormytown Road. The highway then turns northward and then back in a hump shape, with a westbound only right-in/right-out junction to Cedar Lane. After the hump there is another westbound only exit, although there is no entry ramp. The Briarcliff–Peekskill Parkway now turns northward and joins US 9. Here, the highway ends and both US 9 and NY 9A become the Croton Expressway toward Peekskill.

== History ==
During the 1920s, the roads throughout Westchester County were becoming increasingly unsuitable for the volume and speed of automobile traffic. The success of the Bronx River Parkway showed that roadways could be built or upgraded and integrated into the environment, creating roads more pleasing to the eye and less disruptive to surrounding towns. The Westchester County Parkway System created many parkways around the county in the following years, the Briarcliff–Peekskill Parkway one of them. Land acquisition began in the 1920s and construction of the highway began in the early 1930s, with opening on September 4, 1933, as NY 404. The Briarcliff Manor village school was one of the buildings demolished. The county had acquired more land then was ultimately developed, however. The highway was originally intended to be extended to Peekskill however the project was eventually cancelled. The remaining right of way is now part of the Briarcliff Peekskill Trailway. In the 1960s, the Croton Expressway was built as the only completed section of the proposed Interstate 487 (I-487) and the highway was extended to a new junction which allowed NY 9A to continue northward with its parent route, US 9. Unlike many other parkways in New York, the Briarcliff–Peekskill Parkway was never restricted to commercial traffic and continues to allow trucks. By the postwar period, the Briarcliff–Peekskill Parkway had evolved from a county parkway into an important component of the state highway system. Its incorporation into NY 9A increased its role as a regional traffic route, while suburban growth and increasing automobile and commercial traffic placed demands on infrastructure designed for vehicles of the 1920s and 1930s. The highway retained much of its original alignment and characteristic structures, including its narrow roadway and low-clearance bridges, even as its role changed from a scenic parkway to a general-purpose arterial. In the 21st century, the resulting conflict between the highway's historic design and modern traffic loads has become a major consideration in proposals to reconstruct and modernize the highway.

== Exit list ==
The entire route is in Westchester County.

| Location | mi | km | Destinations | Notes |
|---|---|---|---|---|
| Pleasantville | 0.0 | 0.0 | NY 117 Bedford Road | |
| Pleasantville | 0.6 | 0.97 | Taconic State Parkway | Southbound only; exit 5 on the Taconic State Parkway |
| Briarcliff Manor | 1.8 | 2.9 | Pleasantville Road | Right-in/right-out |
| Briarcliff Manor | 2.1 | 3.4 | Carleton Avenue | Uncontrolled intersection, northbound only |
| Briarcliff Manor | 2.1 | 3.4 | NY 100 Saw Mill River Road | NY 100 leaves the highway here |
| Briarcliff Manor | 2.4 | 3.9 | N State Road | At-grade junction |
| Briarcliff Manor | 3.1 | 5.0 | Chappaqua Road | At-grade junction |
| Ossining | 3.6 | 5.8 | NY 133 Croton Avenue | Right-in/right-out |
| Ossining | 3.9 | 6.3 | Ryder Road | Right-in/right-out, southbound only |
| Ossining | 4.9 | 7.9 | NY 134 Croton Dam Road | At-grade junction |
| Ossining | 5.1 | 8.2 | Hawkes Avenue | Right-in/right-out, westbound only |
| Ossining | 5.3 | 8.5 | Stormytown Road | At-grade junction |
| Ossining | 5.7 | 9.2 | Cedar Lane | Westbound only |
| Ossining | 6.2 | 10.0 | Shady Lane Farm Road | Westbound only, exit only |
| Ossining | 6.4 | 10.3 | US 9 Croton Expressway | End of highway, start of Croton Expressway |
1.000 mi = 1.609 km; 1.000 km = 0.621 mi: Concurrency terminus; Incomplete access
