= New York State Route 134 =

State highway in Westchester County, New York, US

New York State Route 134
- Map of Westchester County in southeastern New York with NY 134 highlighted in red

Route information
- Maintained by NYSDOT
- Length: 6.35 mi (10.22 km)
- Existed: 1930–present

Major junctions
- West end: NY 133 in Ossining village
- NY 9A in Ossining town Taconic State Parkway in Yorktown
- East end: NY 100 in Yorktown

Location
- Country: United States
- State: New York
- Counties: Westchester

Highway system
- New York Highways; Interstate; US; State; Reference; Parkways
← NY 133	→ NY 135

New York State Route 134 (NY 134) is a 6.35-mile (10.22 km) state highway in the western part of Westchester County, New York, in the United States. It begins at an intersection with NY 133 in the village of Ossining and heads northeast to the hamlet of Kitchawan, located adjacent to the New Croton Reservoir in the town of Yorktown. From here, the route turns southeast to reach its east end at a junction with NY 100. The highway passes the Thomas J. Watson Research Center, one of the main research headquarters for IBM, just east of an interchange with the Taconic State Parkway.

Taken over by the state of New York between 1908 and 1926, NY 134 was assigned to its current alignment as part of the 1930 renumbering of state highways in New York. In 1960, in conjunction with construction of the Watson Research Center, an interchange was added to NY 134 for the Taconic.

== Route description ==
NY 134 begins at an intersection with NY 133 (Croton Avenue) in the village of Ossining, just east of the latter's west end at U.S. Route 9 (North Highland Avenue). The route proceeds northeast as the two-lane Dale Avenue, passing through a residential section of the village and passing Dale Cemetery. Just past the cemetery, the highway changes names to Hawkes Avenue as it leaves the village for other parts of the town of Ossining. The route continues generally northeastward past homes to the vicinity of NY 9A (Briarcliff–Peekskill Parkway), where NY 134 forks from Hawkes Avenue and begins to parallel NY 9A on Kitchawan State Road, a short connector to nearby Croton Dam Road. Upon intersecting Croton Dam Road, NY 134 turns northward and immediately intersects NY 9A at an at-grade intersection.

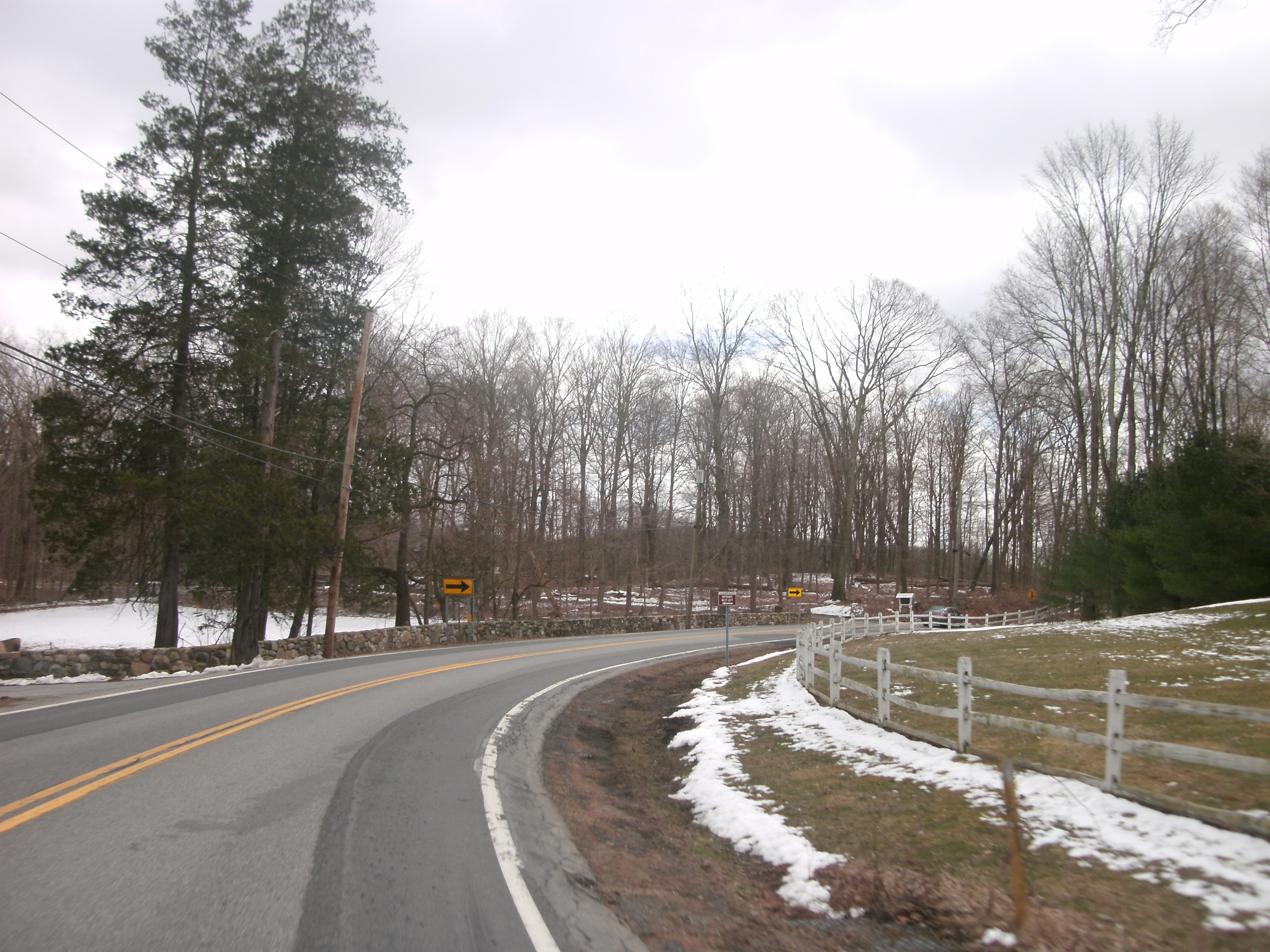
NY 134 passing along a curve in front of the Kitchawan Preserve

Past NY 9A, NY 134 heads northeast across the northern fringe of Ossining, climbing uphill as it passes Purdy Pond and crossing into the town of New Castle. Here, the homes gradually diminish in number, with dense woods taking their place. This trend continues into the adjacent town of Yorktown, where NY 134 becomes Kitchawan Road. About 1 mile (1.6 km) from the town line, the highway entering an interchange with the Taconic State Parkway. For a short distance after the interchange, NY 134 becomes four lanes as the road serves IBM's Thomas J. Watson Research Center. It narrows to two lanes past the facility, from where the highway takes a slightly more easterly track across Yorktown to reach the Kitchawan Preserve on the southern edge of the New Croton Reservoir.

At this point, the road makes a turn to the southeast to enter the small hamlet of Kitchawan, located at NY 134's junction with Pines Bridge Road (unsigned County Route 1323 or CR 1323). Pines Bridge Road was once NY 135, and its junction with NY 134 in Kitchawan was NY 135's eastern terminus. From Pines Bridge Road, NY 134 bends southward to run alongside a reservoir inlet connecting to Cornell Brook. After about 1,500 feet (460 m), the route makes a final turn to the east to cross Cornell Brook and reach its east end at an intersection with NY 100 (Saw Mill River Road).

== History ==
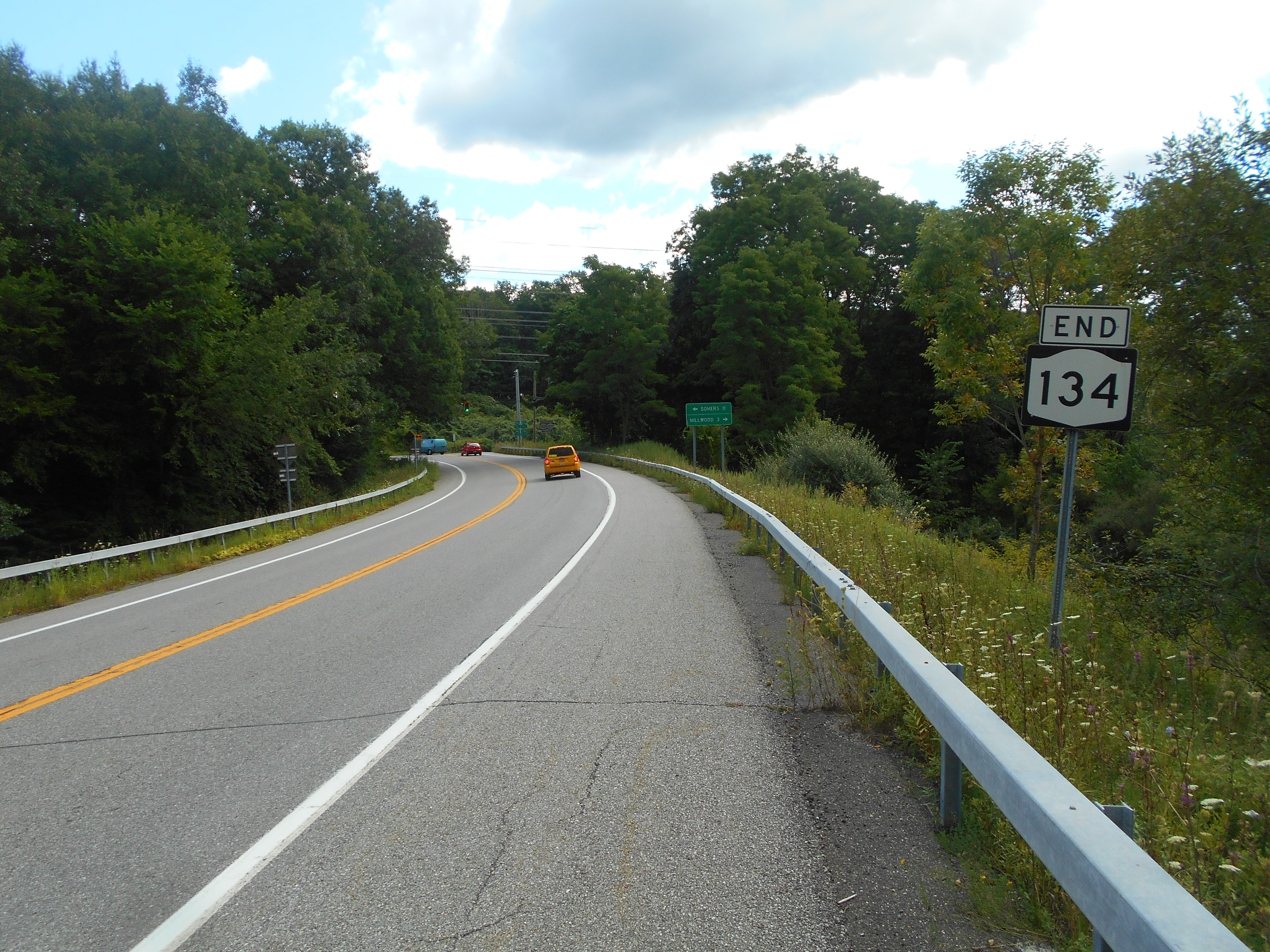
NY 134 eastbound approaching its terminus, NY 100, in Kitchawan

The origins of NY 134 date back to the late 1900s when the state of New York improved the portion of the route outside of the Ossining village limits to state highway standards. A contract for the $59,973 project (equivalent to $2.07 million in 2025) was awarded on June 30, 1908, and the rebuilt road was added to the state highway system on August 1, 1910, as unsigned State Highway 768 (SH 768). Its continuation into the village limits was taken over by the state by 1926. Neither state highway had a posted route number until the 1930 renumbering of state highways in New York, when hundreds of state-maintained roads were given signed designations for the first time. The two state highways were combined to create NY 134.

In 1960, a new interchange was built between NY 134 and the Taconic State Parkway as part of the construction of IBM's Thomas J. Watson Research Center. During the excavation process for the junction, a bone from a woolly mammoth (colloquially known as Jefferson's mammoth) was found buried in the earth below. The bones were moved to the New York State Museum in Albany. The construction also required the relocation of the Kitchawan Tavern from the site of the exit to the junction of Kitchawan and Chadeanye roads a half-mile (0.8 km) to the east.

== Major intersections ==
The entire route is in Westchester County.

Location	mi	km	Destinations	Notes
Village of Ossining	0.00	0.00	NY 133 – Millwood, Mount Kisco	Western terminus
Town of Ossining	1.18	1.90	NY 9A north	Access via Hawkes Avenue
Town of Ossining	1.41	2.27	NY 9A – Croton-on-Hudson, Briarcliff Manor	
Yorktown	4.43	7.13	Taconic State Parkway – Albany, New York City	Exits 11A-B on Taconic State Parkway
Yorktown	6.35	10.22	NY 100 – Millwood, Somers	Eastern terminus; hamlet of Kitchawan
1.000 mi = 1.609 km; 1.000 km = 0.621 mi
