= New York State Route 133 =

State highway in Westchester County, New York, US

New York State Route 133
- Map of Westchester County in southeastern New York with NY 133 highlighted in red

Route information
- Maintained by NYSDOT
- Length: 8.71 mi (14.02 km)
- Existed: 1930–present

Major junctions
- West end: US 9 in Ossining village
- NY 9A in Ossining village NY 100 / Taconic State Parkway in Millwood; Saw Mill River Parkway in Mount Kisco
- East end: NY 117 in Mount Kisco

Location
- Country: United States
- State: New York
- Counties: Westchester

Highway system
- New York Highways; Interstate; US; State; Reference; Parkways
← NY 132	→ NY 134

New York State Route 133 (NY 133) is an 8.71-mile (14.02 km) long state highway in Westchester County, New York, in the United States. It begins at U.S. Route 9 (US 9) in the village of Ossining, goes through several hamlets in the town of New Castle (Millwood and Tompkins Corners), and ends at NY 117 in the village of Mount Kisco.

NY 133 between Ossining and the junction with NY 100 in New Castle was part of the Croton Turnpike, which connected Ossining to the hamlet of Somers, established in 1807. Dissolved by the state in 1849, the turnpike become a public road, and the section was added to the state highway system between 1903 and 1917. The portion of NY 133 from NY 100 to Mount Kisco became a state highway in 1908, after construction by William McCabe, a local general contractor. The alignment was designated as NY 133 in the 1930 state highway renumbering.

== Route description ==
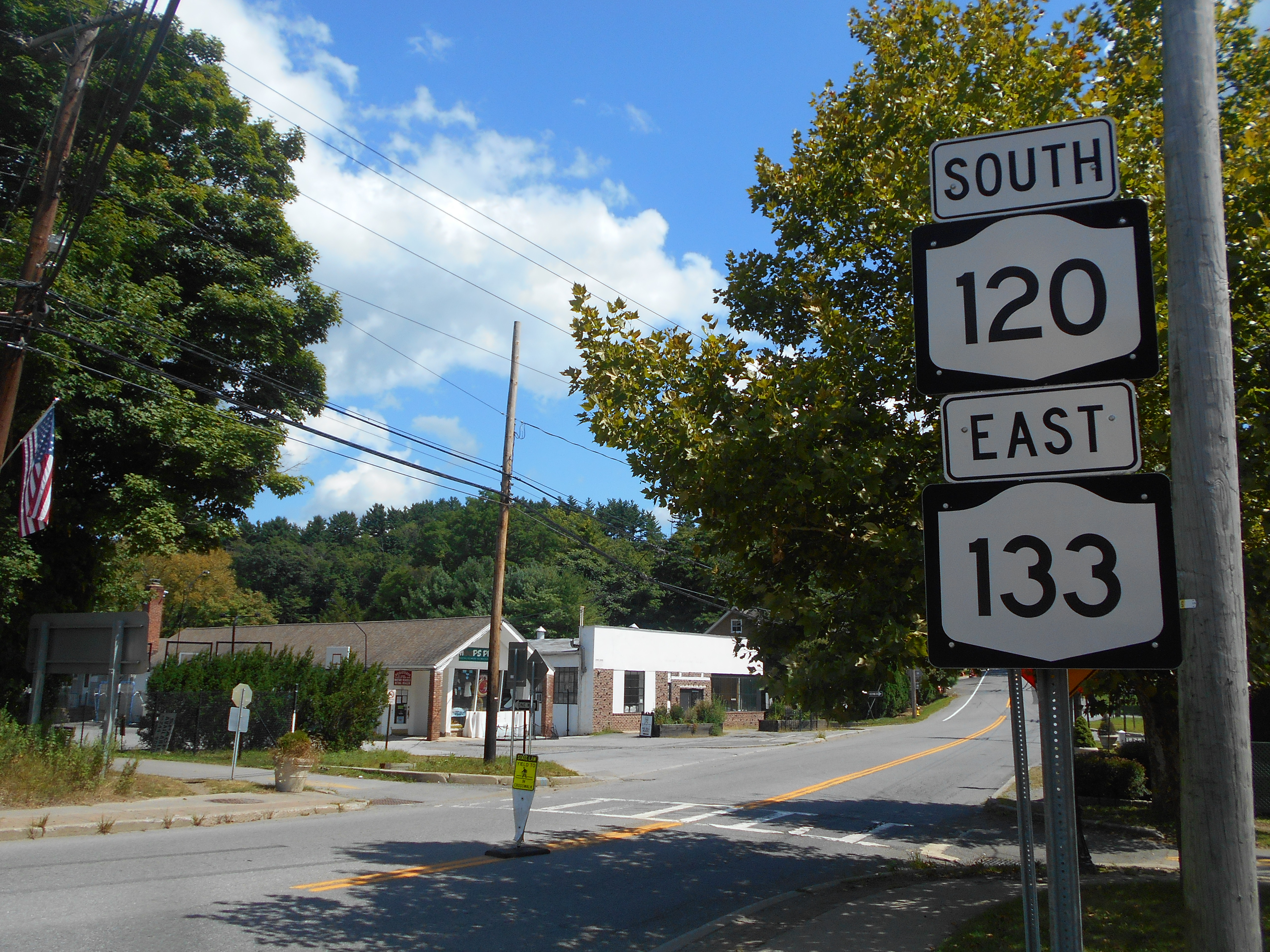
NY 120 southbound along concurrency with NY 133 in Millwood

NY 133 begins in the downtown of Ossining village at an intersection with US 9 (North Highland Avenue). NY 133 proceeds northeast through Ossining as Croton Avenue, a two-lane commercial street. Winding northeast for several blocks, NY 133 passes multiple apartment buildings before intersecting with the southern terminus of NY 134 (Dale Avenue). At NY 134, NY 133 turns closer to the east, crossing into a large residential section of Ossining after Linden Avenue. NY 133 winds eastward for several blocks, becoming a commercial/residential street through the town of Ossining, winding eastward for a distance into a grade-separated interchange with NY 9A (the Briarcliff–Peekskill Parkway).

After crossing NY 9A, NY 133 continues eastward through Ossining, changing names to Somerstown Road. Now a two-lane residential road, NY 133 bends northeastward, winding through town. At Brookside Road, the route continues northeast, changing names to Somerstown Turnpike. The route remains similar in design for several miles, crossing into the town of New Castle as a two-lane residential road. NY 133 soon intersects with NY 100 (Saw Mill River Road), forming a concurrency through New Castle. After the junction, NY 133 and NY 100 enter an interchange with the Taconic State Parkway, which uses ramps from Campfire Road. After this interchange, the routes enter the hamlet of Millwood.

The concurrency ends as NY 133 turns northeast on Station Place, passing a strip mall as it bends north along Station Place. After the bend, the route becomes a two-lane residential/commercial street through Millwood, passing the former site of the Millwood station of the New York Central Railroad's Putnam Division. This station was demolished in May 2012 after years of neglect. Just after the former station, NY 133 intersects with NY 120 (Shingle House Road). At this intersection, NY 133 and NY 120 become concurrent along the street now known as Millwood Road (formerly Shingle House). The two routes wind eastward along a two-lane residential road, passing Gedney Park and leaving the hamlet of Millwood. A short distance to the northeast of Millwood, NY 120 forks east on Quaker Road, while NY 133 continues north on Millwood.

NY 133 continues northeast on Millwood Road as a two-lane residential street, winding through the town of New Castle, passing numerous homes for a couple miles. This section is often referred to as "Hawk Alley." After making a turn to the east, NY 133 intersects with Seven Bridges Road (unsigned County Route 5 (CR 5)). The route winds eastward after CR 5, soon starting the same wind towards the northeast. The residences give way to dense woods, with NY 133 soon entering the village of Mount Kisco. Just after crossing into Mount Kisco, NY 133 enters an interchange with exit 34 of the Saw Mill River Parkway. Now known as West Main Street, NY 133 is a two-lane residential street for several blocks, soon bending southeast at Kisco Avenue. Here the name changes to Main Street, and NY 133 passes the Mount Kisco Metro-North station. Three blocks from the train station, the route enters Feigel Square, where it intersects with NY 117 (North Bedford Road), which serves as the eastern terminus of NY 133.

== History ==
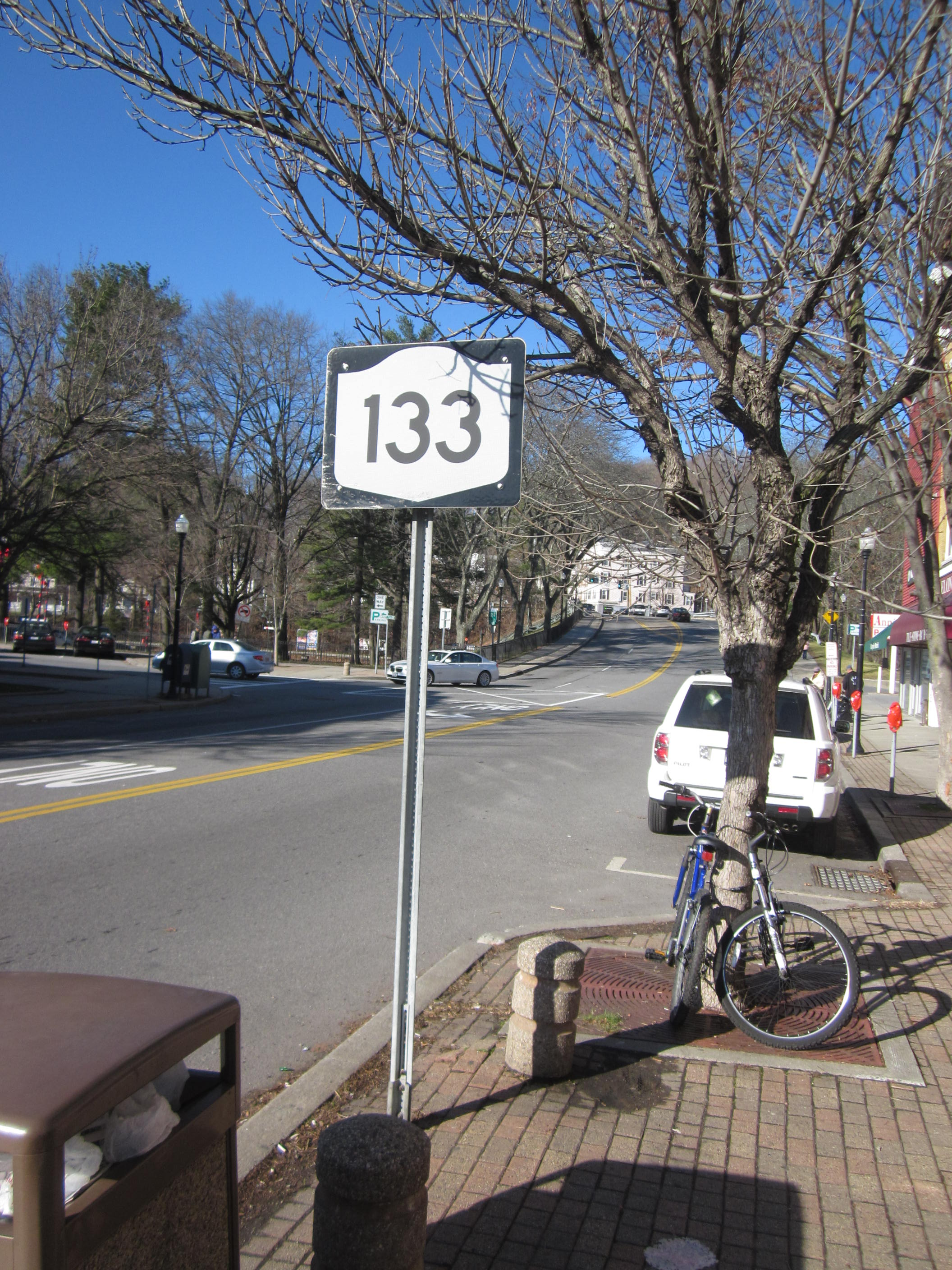
NY 133 westbound through the village of Mount Kisco

The alignment of NY 133 through the town of New Castle was part of the former Croton Turnpike (also known as the Somerstown Turnpike), which connected the town of Somers with the village of Sing Sing (current-day Ossining). The Croton Turnpike Company was established on April 6, 1807 by charter from the New York State Assembly at the cost of 12.5 cents per wagon with at least two horses. By the middle of the 19th century, the Croton Turnpike had been dissolved, after an 1849 request to repeal the charter given in 1807 had passed the Assembly.

The first piece of NY 133 upgraded to state highway standards was the alignment concurrent with current-day NY 100 in Millwood. Designated State Highway 143 (SH 143), the alignment was first contracted in 1903 for a 3.14 miles (5.05 km) segment of macadam. The new road would be 24 feet (7.3 m) wide and use 12 feet (3.7 m) of macadam pavement. The project cost $30,430.00 (1903 USD) with the state covering half the cost ($15,215.00). The contract was let on June 15, 1903, construction was completed and accepted into the state highway system on December 21, 1903.

The alignment of NY 133 between current-day NY 100 in Millwood and the Mount Kisco village line, designated SH 768, was upgraded to state highway standards in the early 20th century. A contract was let on November 26, 1907 to the contractor William F. McCabe for a total of $36,775.38 (1907 USD; $1270721 in 2013 USD) for the 4.39 miles (7.07 km) segment. The alignment would be 24 feet (7.3 m) wide, with 12 feet (3.7 m) of macadam. McCabe would use New York State-approved stones for the roadway, with sand to sustain the road. When the contract was completed, the project to upgrade the road cost $39,924.03 (1907 USD). The project was completed in October 1908, being accepted into the state highway system on October 19.

On August 31, 1915, the portion of NY 133 between the border of the village of Ossining and NY 100, designated SH 1307, was contracted for an upgrade. The 1.89 miles (3.04 km) segment cost $28,313.22 (1915 USD), with the state giving in $18,402.94 in funds for the project. The alignment would be up to 28 feet (8.5 m) wide for traffic outside of Ossining. The project was completed in 1918 and entered the state highway system on August 27.

NY 133 was created in the 1930 state highway renumbering, with no major changes to its alignment since then.

== Major intersections ==
The entire route is in Westchester County.

Location	mi	km	Destinations	Notes
Village of Ossining	0.00	0.00	US 9	Western terminus
Village of Ossining	0.30	0.48	NY 134 east	Western terminus of NY 134
Village of Ossining	1.32	2.12	NY 9A – Croton-on-Hudson, Briarcliff Manor	Interchange
Town of New Castle	3.31– 3.45	5.33– 5.55	NY 100 south / Taconic State Parkway – Briarcliff Manor, Valhalla, Albany	Western end of NY 100 concurrency; exit 8 on Taconic State Parkway
Town of New Castle	3.70	5.95	NY 100 north	Eastern end of NY 100 concurrency; hamlet of Millwood
Town of New Castle	4.17	6.71	NY 120 north – Somers	Western end of NY 120 concurrency; hamlet of Millwood
Town of New Castle	4.70	7.56	NY 120 south – Chappaqua	Eastern end of NY 120 concurrency
Mount Kisco	8.14	13.10	Saw Mill River Parkway	Exit 34 on Saw Mill River Parkway
Mount Kisco	8.71	14.02	NY 117 – Katonah, Chappaqua	Eastern terminus
1.000 mi = 1.609 km; 1.000 km = 0.621 mi: Concurrency terminus
