= Taconic State Parkway =

North–south highway in New York

Taconic State Parkway
- Taconic State Parkway highlighted in red

Route information
- Maintained by NYSDOT
- Length: 104.12 mi (167.56 km)
- Existed: 1925–present
- Restrictions: No trucks, buses, trailers, or vehicles over 8 feet tall; no drivers with learner's permits south of exit 23

Major junctions
- South end: Bronx River Parkway in North Castle
- Sprain Brook Parkway in Hawthorne; NY 141 / Saw Mill River Parkway in Hawthorne; NY 9A / NY 100 in Mount Pleasant; US 202 / NY 35 / Bear Mountain State Parkway in Crompond; US 6 in Shrub Oak; I-84 in East Fishkill; NY 55 in LaGrange; US 44 in Pleasant Valley; NY 199 in Milan; NY 23 in Claverack
- North end: I-90 Toll / Berkshire Connector in Chatham

Location
- Country: United States
- State: New York
- Counties: Westchester, Putnam, Dutchess, Columbia

Highway system
- New York Highways; Interstate; US; State; Reference; Parkways
- Taconic State Parkway
- U.S. National Register of Historic Places
- U.S. Historic district
- Area: 7,067 acres (2,860 ha)
- Architects: Westchester County Park Commission; et al.
- NRHP reference No.: 05001398
- Added to NRHP: December 8, 2005

The Taconic State Parkway (often called the Taconic or the TSP) is a 104.12-mile (167.56 km) limited-access parkway between Kensico Dam and Chatham, the longest in the U.S. state of New York. It follows a generally north–south route midway between the Hudson River and the Connecticut and Massachusetts state lines, much of its upper section along the westernmost flank of the Taconic Mountains. It is open only to passenger vehicles, as with other parkways in New York, and maintained by the state Department of Transportation (NYSDOT), the fourth agency to have that responsibility.

Franklin D. Roosevelt, who had long envisioned a scenic road through the eastern Hudson Valley, was instrumental in making it a reality as a way to provide access to existing and planned state parks in the region. Its winding, hilly route was designed by landscape architect Gilmore Clarke to offer scenic vistas of the Hudson Highlands, Catskills and Taconic regions. The bridges and now-closed service areas were designed to be aesthetically pleasing. It has been praised for the beauty of not only the surrounding landscape and views it offers, but the way the road itself integrates with and presents them.

It was completed in its present form in the early 1960s. In 2005, the entire highway, including its supporting structures, was listed on the National Register of Historic Places in recognition of its historic importance in the development of parkways in the 20th century, and Roosevelt's role in creating it. It is the second-longest continuous road listed on the Register after Virginia's Skyline Drive, and the longest limited-access highway. (Note: The next longest is the Baltimore–Washington Parkway at 32 miles (51 km).)

The parkway continues to provide access to several state parks, including Franklin D. Roosevelt State Park. It has also become an important regional artery, one of the primary routes to northern New England and the Capital Region of New York from the Hudson Valley, New York City and Long Island. The southern sections, particularly in Westchester County, have become a commuter route into the city for residents who moved into towns that became suburbanized as a result of the parkway. The state and regional transportation planners have worked to adapt to this change since the 1940s.

== Route description ==
The Taconic's character changes with its surroundings. In the busy suburbs of its first few miles, it is a narrow at-grade roadway, paralleling a commuter rail line through a small downtown. Soon after that, it becomes a wide divided highway, with median strips and gentle turn radii similar to an Interstate Highway carrying much commuter traffic.

In the Hudson Highlands, it narrows again as it curves back and forth and climbs up and down quickly to its highest point. When the terrain levels out again, it widens and begins to assume its scenic character in a growing, exurban area with at-grade intersections. Its northernmost section, located on the ridges between the Hudson Valley and the Taconic Mountains along the state borders to the east, offers mountain and hilltop vistas as the road itself continues to curve gently through bucolic surroundings. This winding route contributes to its 104.12-mile (167.56 km) length, which makes the Taconic New York State's longest parkway.

=== Westchester County ===
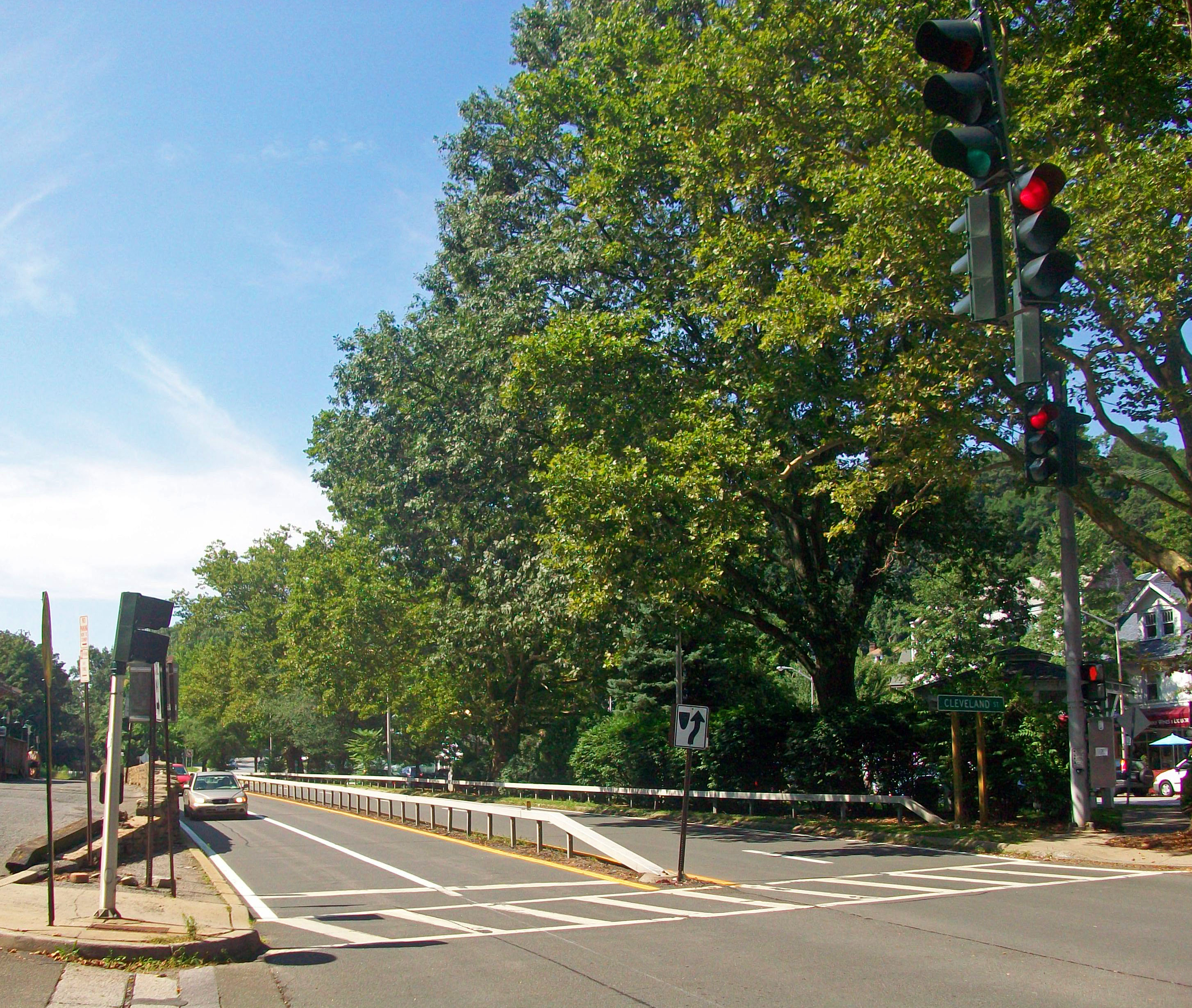
The Taconic at the Cleveland Street intersection in Valhalla

The Taconic begins at Kensico Circle, just south of Kensico Dam, in the town of North Castle, also the northern terminus of the Bronx River Parkway. The roadway here is a narrow, four-lane expressway. It curves northwest to a traffic light at Cleveland Street in the hamlet of Valhalla. The Valhalla station on Metro-North Railroad's Harlem Line is on the west side, with the downtown area on the east. It is the only densely developed community the road goes through rather than near.

After crossing under the stone arch bridge carrying Legion Drive over the parkway, the first of many such rustic overpasses, the Taconic begins a long section going past Gate of Heaven Cemetery and paralleling the railroad tracks past the small Mount Pleasant Metro-North train station, built to allow access to the surrounding cemetery of that name. The road then crosses over the train line into a wooded area where the two roadways split wide apart, merging with the Sprain Brook Parkway.

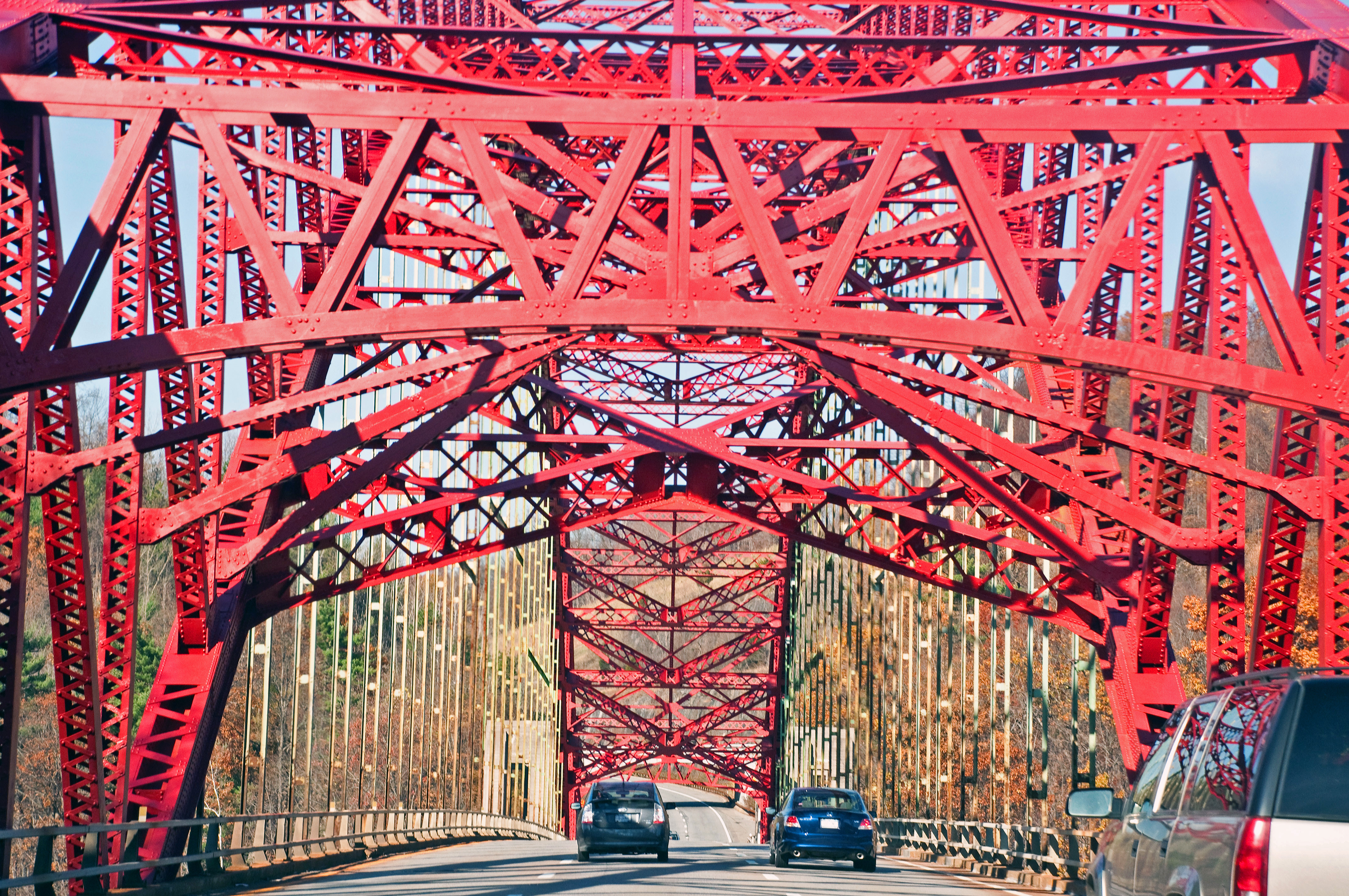
The northbound AMVETS Memorial Bridge, which crosses over the Croton Reservoir, a collecting basin for the New York City Water System

At the merge, the Taconic becomes a wider, six-lane freeway. For the remainder of Westchester County, the Taconic has been rebuilt, widened, and modernized to meet the needs of commuter growth, bearing little resemblance to its original design. A thousand feet (300 m) to the north, after a small interchange with NY 141, a three-level stack interchange allows access to the Saw Mill River Parkway northbound (and southbound from the southbound lanes). North of the interchange power lines and Saw Mill River Road (New York State Route 9A or NY 9A and NY 100) on the west parallel the parkway past undeveloped Graham Hills County Park. The next exit, at Bedford Road (NY 117), serves Pleasantville to the east. Just north of it, a short fork allows traffic to divert to NY 9A and 100, which split away toward Ossining.

The Taconic continues north through a minimally developed area of low hills, past another exit serving Pleasantville, and then across another town line into New Castle. Route 100 returns to parallel the highway on the west again, then joins NY 133 at the next exit, serving Ossining and Millwood. About a half mile (0.80 km) north of that exit, northbound traffic can also exit, and southbound traffic enters, at Pines Bridge Road.

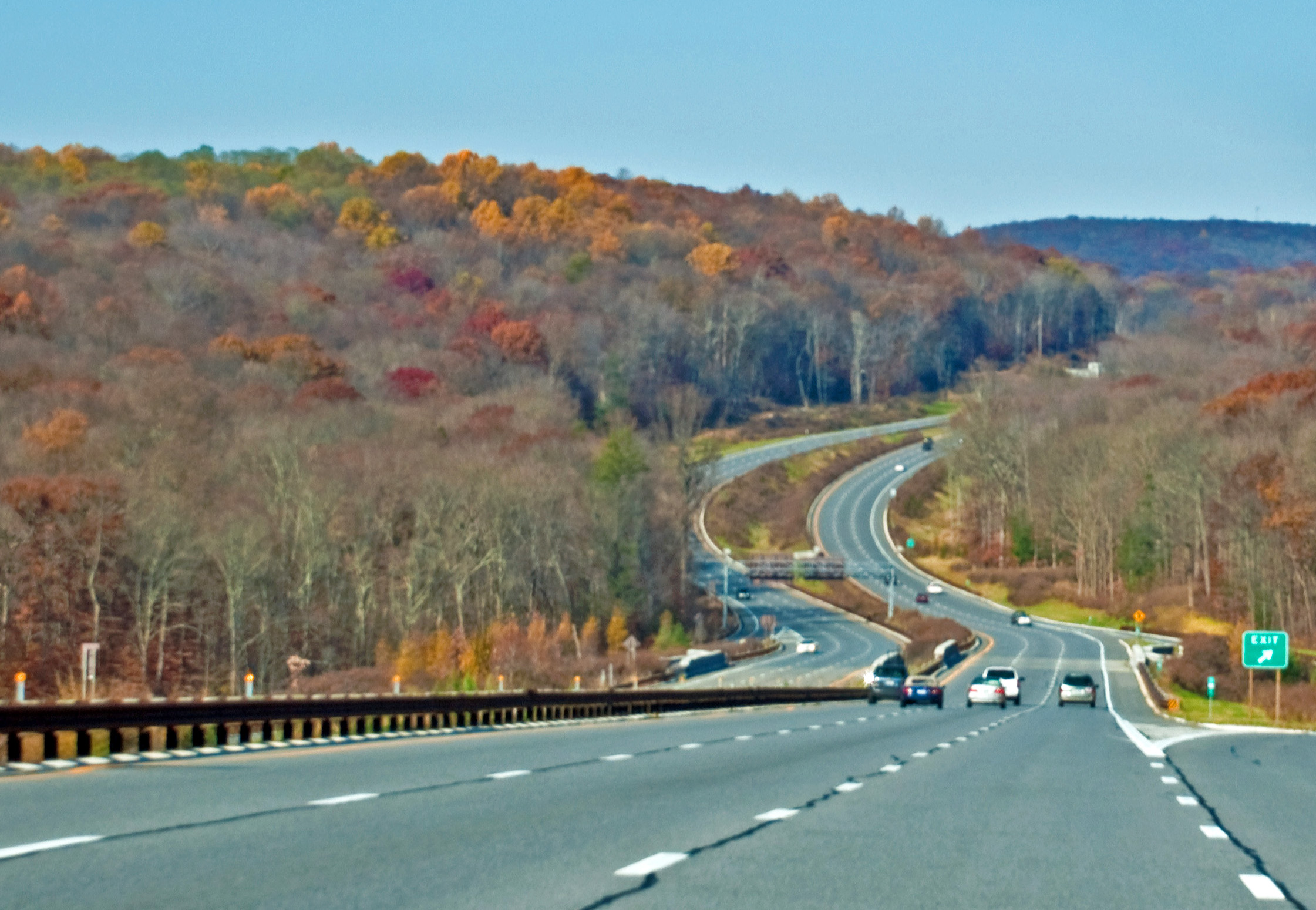
Looking north along the Taconic at the Bear Mountain Parkway exit in Crompond

The roadways grow far apart over the next mile before coming together again at the NY 134 exit, as Turkey Mountain, one of the Manhattan Hills, looms ahead. The Taconic then enters Yorktown, the last town along the Taconic in Westchester County, and split again until they are 1,500 feet (460 m) apart, with neighborhoods and houses between them, to the two bridges over New Croton Reservoir, part of the New York City water supply system. Once on the other side, in the town of Yorktown, they converge again to their previous width. The next exit, at Underhill Avenue, provides access to downtown Yorktown and the reservoir.

Past the Baldwin Road exit a half mile (0.80 km) north of Underhill, the Taconic curves westward along the south side of Mohansic Lake. When the road returns to a northerly course, an exit allows entrance to Franklin D. Roosevelt State Park. It is followed by the Crompond Road (U.S. Route 202 or US 202 and NY 35) exit, which serves Peekskill to the west as well as Yorktown. Just beyond it, the Bear Mountain State Parkway, a legacy of the Taconic's original planned route and purpose, leaves to the west as the road drops into a wide valley carved by a tributary of the Hudson, the first place where the road begins to respond to the increasing relief of the landscape.

The Taconic then passes through undeveloped woods, part of another local park, and under a footbridge carrying a hiking trail. Curving northeast, the exits for NY 132 and US 6 (recently improved), with residences on either side of the parkway, herald Shrub Oak and Jefferson Valley. A short distance past that exit, the parkway crosses into Putnam County.

=== Putnam County ===
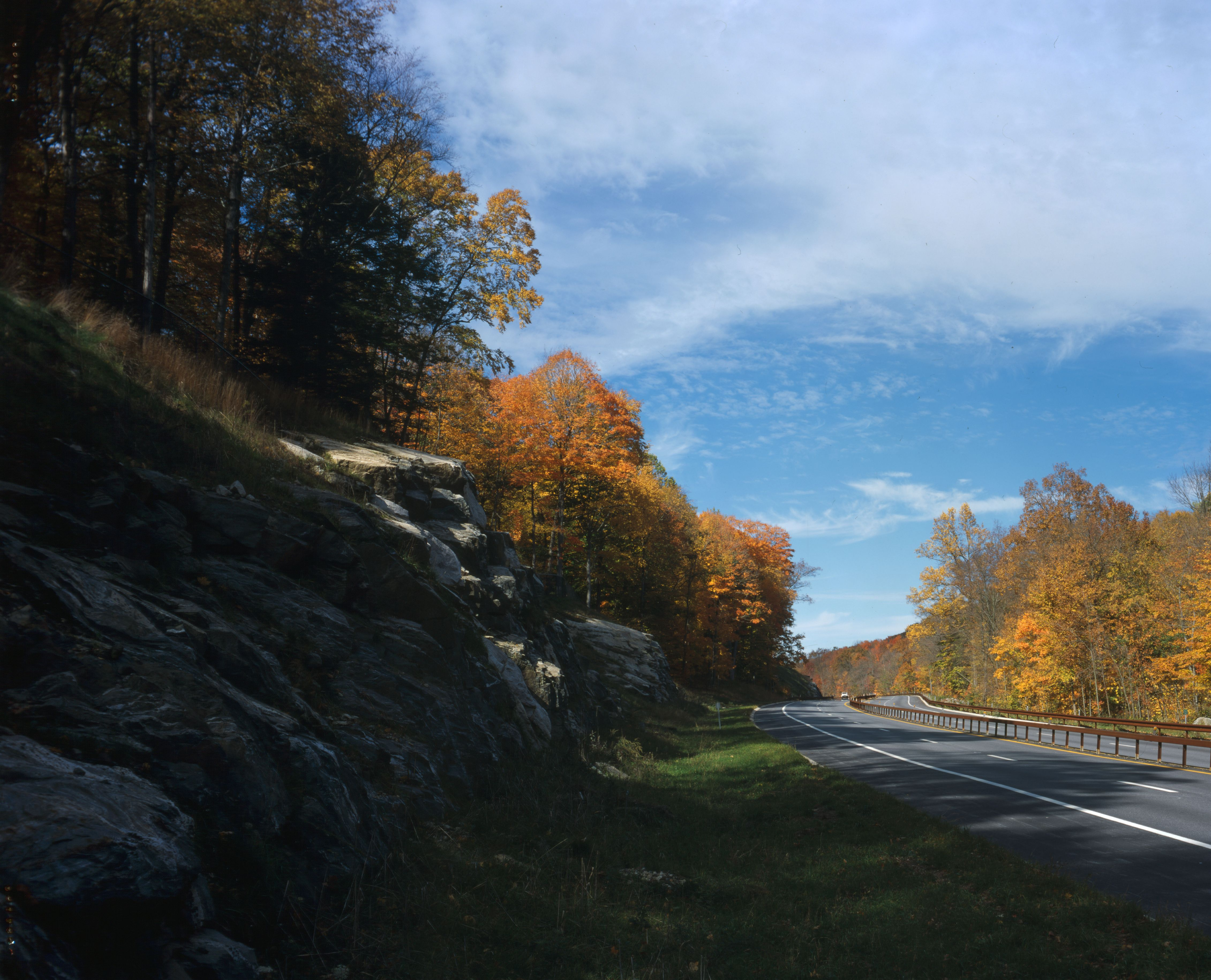
Looking north along the Taconic just north of the Peekskill Hollow Road exit in Putnam Valley

The road narrows to a four-lane divided highway as it reaches the county line in the town of Putnam Valley, with the shoulders replaced by soft curbs, in preparation for the rugged terrain of the next 12 miles (19 km). From this point north, the original design of the Taconic is still intact for the most part, aside from safety improvements such as the removal of almost all at-grade intersections. Curves become sharper, with the widest having a radius of 11,459 feet (3,493 m). It remains generally level for the first two miles (3.2 km), past the Bryant Pond Road exit serving Mahopac. The land around the road is heavily wooded and less developed than in Westchester.

One mile (1.6 km) to the north, the road begins to descend 350 feet (110 m) in 1.1 miles (1.8 km) alongside a steep ridge, narrowing to less than 100 feet (30 m), with a high stone retaining wall along the east side, to Peekskill Hollow Creek and the exit for the similarly named road, briefly entering the town of Carmel in the process. It starts to climb again just past the exit, and 1/2 mile (0.80 km) to the north it goes into an S-curved section with both segments having extremely narrow radii. The Taconic moves to the east in the process then resumes its roughly northward ascent up the Roaring Creek valley into Clarence Fahnestock State Park. For the next 5.5 miles (8.9 km) it crosses this 14,000-acre (5,700 ha) protected area of the eastern Hudson Highlands, with no development visible from the highway.

The roadways begin to separate as the parkway's ascent continues through heavily wooded terrain past rocky cliffs and outcrops between two lakes. Next to a now-closed overlook on the eastern side, with the two roadways 500 feet (150 m) apart in the densely wooded country. Signs on both roadways mark the Taconic's highest elevation, almost 1,200 feet (370 m) above sea level.

A short distance beyond that, a stone bridge marks the NY 301 exit that serves as the main access to the state park, and the bathing area and hiking trails at nearby Canopus Lake. The parkway begins to descend again, entering its last Putnam County town, Kent. It bends east again, and within two miles (3.2 km) it crosses into Dutchess County.

=== Dutchess County ===
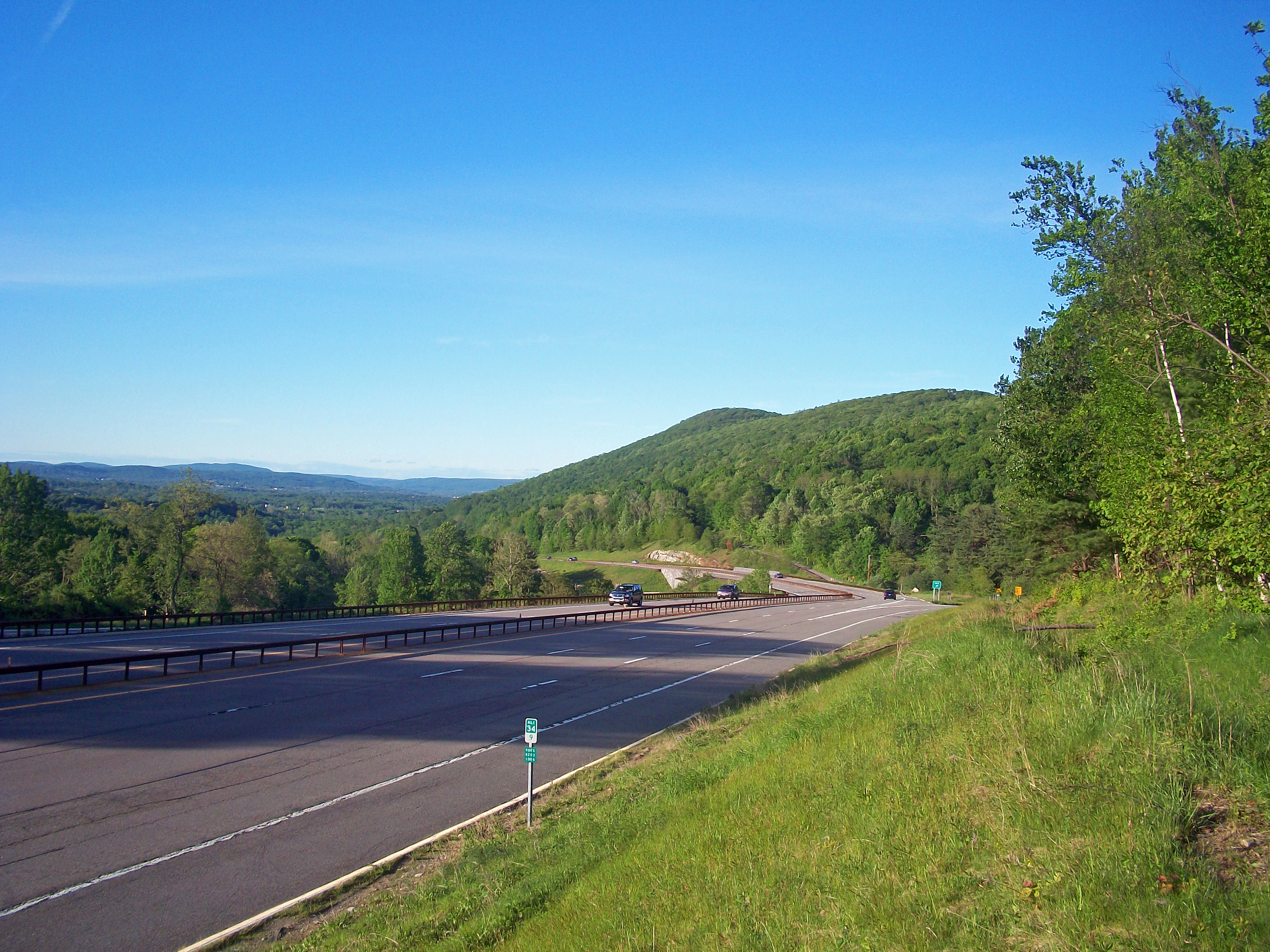
Looking north along the Taconic at the Miller Hill Road exit in East Fishkill

Continuing its easterly slant, the Taconic starts leveling out in Dutchess County, the largest county segment of any of the four counties along the road, entering the town of East Fishkill. Just south of the Miller Hill Road exit, the first in the county, the road widens, with grassy slopes on its east side. At this point the hills farther north are visible in the distance, and the valley to the west, between Hosner and Shenandoah mountains, opens up occasional scenic vistas to the west.

A grade crossing with a flashing overhead warning beacon was replaced in 2000 by a grade-separated exit, making the Appalachian Trail's crossing here less hazardous. The Taconic levels off into a narrow section bearing due northeast along Hosner Mountain's steep west slope, with stone walls on either side. This ends after a mile with the Interstate 84 (I-84) interchange.

North of the Interstate Highway, the parkway bends to the northwest and starts to assume the character it retains through most of Dutchess County, with a wider, intermittently cleared median and gentler turns (their radii reaching almost 23,000 feet (7,000 m), more than twice that of the widest curve in Putnam County), taking it through the now lower hills. There are still no shoulders. A closed rest area sits in the median between I-84 and the NY 52 exit two miles (3.2 km) farther north.

The road then bends back toward the northeast, narrowing again through some wooded stretches over the next few miles to the Beekman Road (County Route 9 or CR 9) exit. This area, rural and agricultural when the highway was built, has become more developed in the last decades, with residential subdivisions and golf courses replacing the silos and haystacks as landmarks off the road.

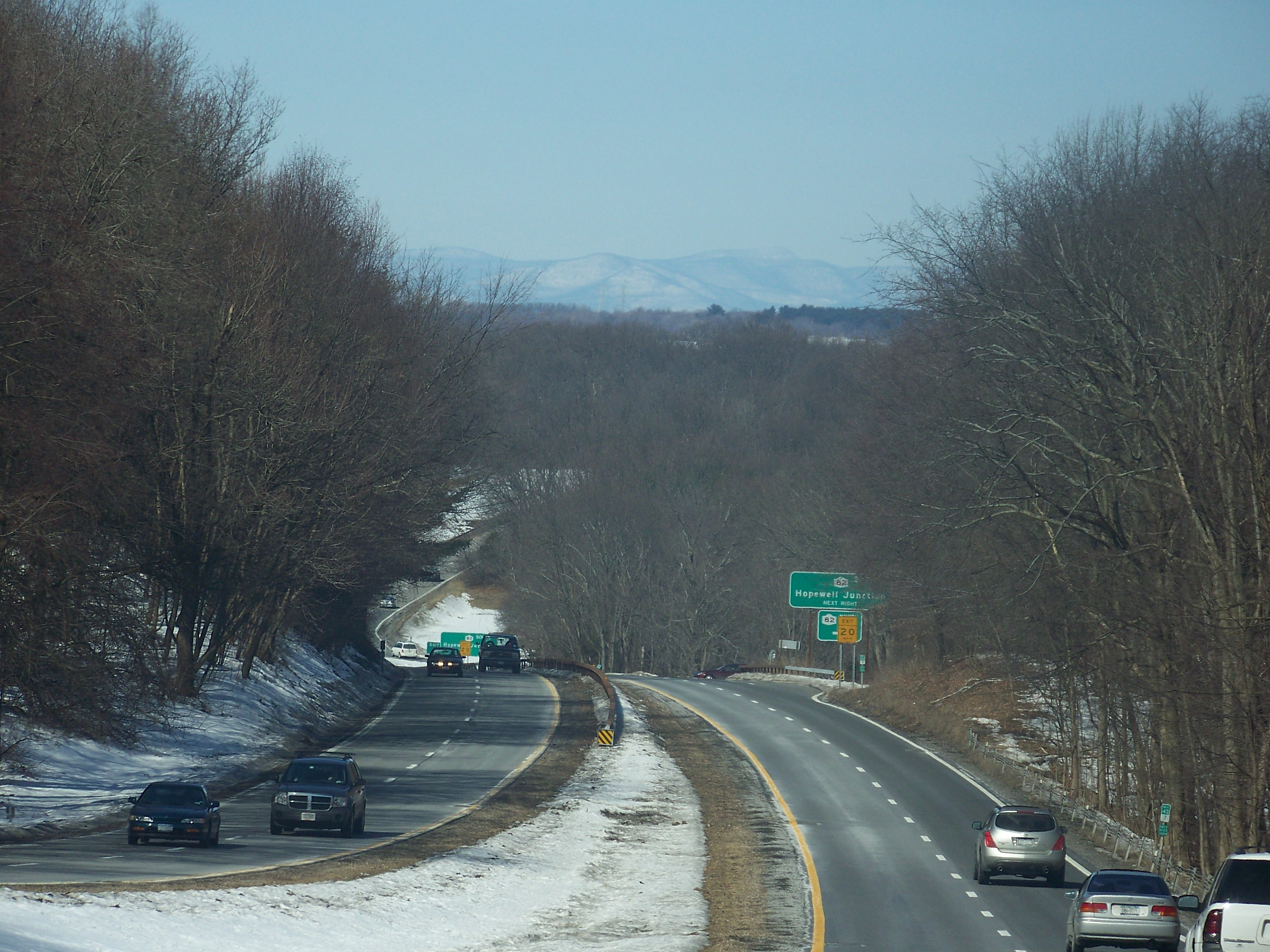
Looking north along the Taconic at the NY 82 exit in Arthursburg

A long curve back to the northwest again takes the Taconic to the first of its two interchanges with NY 82, at Arthursburg. Almost a mile to its north, the Arthursburg Road at-grade crossing was closed, and a southbound off-ramp and on-ramp were built. The road bends back north into the town of LaGrange to the next exit a half-mile (800 m) beyond, at Noxon Road (CR 21), a new exit accessible only to northbound traffic via an off-ramp.

The road widens through a wooded area and then narrows past another service area just before Todd Hill Road. The road drops to cross a creek, then rises again to the NY 55 exit, one of two roads serving the city of Poughkeepsie to the west, near Freedom Plains. Its slow undulation with the landscape continues past the now closed Skidmore Road grade crossing as it heads due north into the town of Pleasant Valley and the less developed half of Dutchess County.

The roadways separate widely (750 feet or 230 metres) again for a mile in the woods east of James Baird State Park. An entry road forks to the left from the northbound lanes and crosses the southbound lanes via an underpass with on/off ramp. The two roadways descend and come together again by the Mountain Road grade crossing.

It climbs a hill after the McDonnell Road crossing, then descends to the Rossway Road crossing. A quarter-mile (400 m) to the north, a dead-end road leaves the northbound lanes for the nearby Taconic–Hereford Multiple Use Area. Several other local roads cross the parkway until it reaches one of its straightest stretches, which then curves to the first grade-separated exit in several miles, US 44, the other main route to Poughkeepsie, between Millbrook and Pleasant Valley.

The road passes through a much more wooded area as it makes a long curve into its next junction, the grade intersection at Hibernia Road. A bridge over Wappinger Creek 0.1 miles (160 m) to the north separates that grade crossing from the one with Hollow Road (CR 14) and takes the road into the town of Clinton. Another half-mile (800 m) north, at the next exit, NY 115 has its eastern terminus while Salt Point Turnpike continues.

A slight western slant continues as the parkway traverses a landscape now thoroughly rural, with fields and woodlots alternating. Two more grade crossings, at Willow and Pumpkin lanes, follow through a long curve to the east and back. At Nine Partners Road, the Taconic is back on a northward heading as it slips east of the Stanford town line.

It begins to climb onto the high ground between the Hudson and the Taconic Mountains to the east. To the west there are occasional glimpses across the river valley to the Catskill Escarpment to the west. From here the parkway bends eastward again, entering the town of Milan and climbs slowly through generally wooded area, passing another grade crossing at Cold Spring Road. The next exit, at NY 199, is the last in Dutchess County. After another long bend east, the Taconic goes north again and crosses into Columbia County just past Roeliff Jansen Kill Multiple Use Area and the Jackson Corners Road (CR 2) exit.

=== Columbia County ===
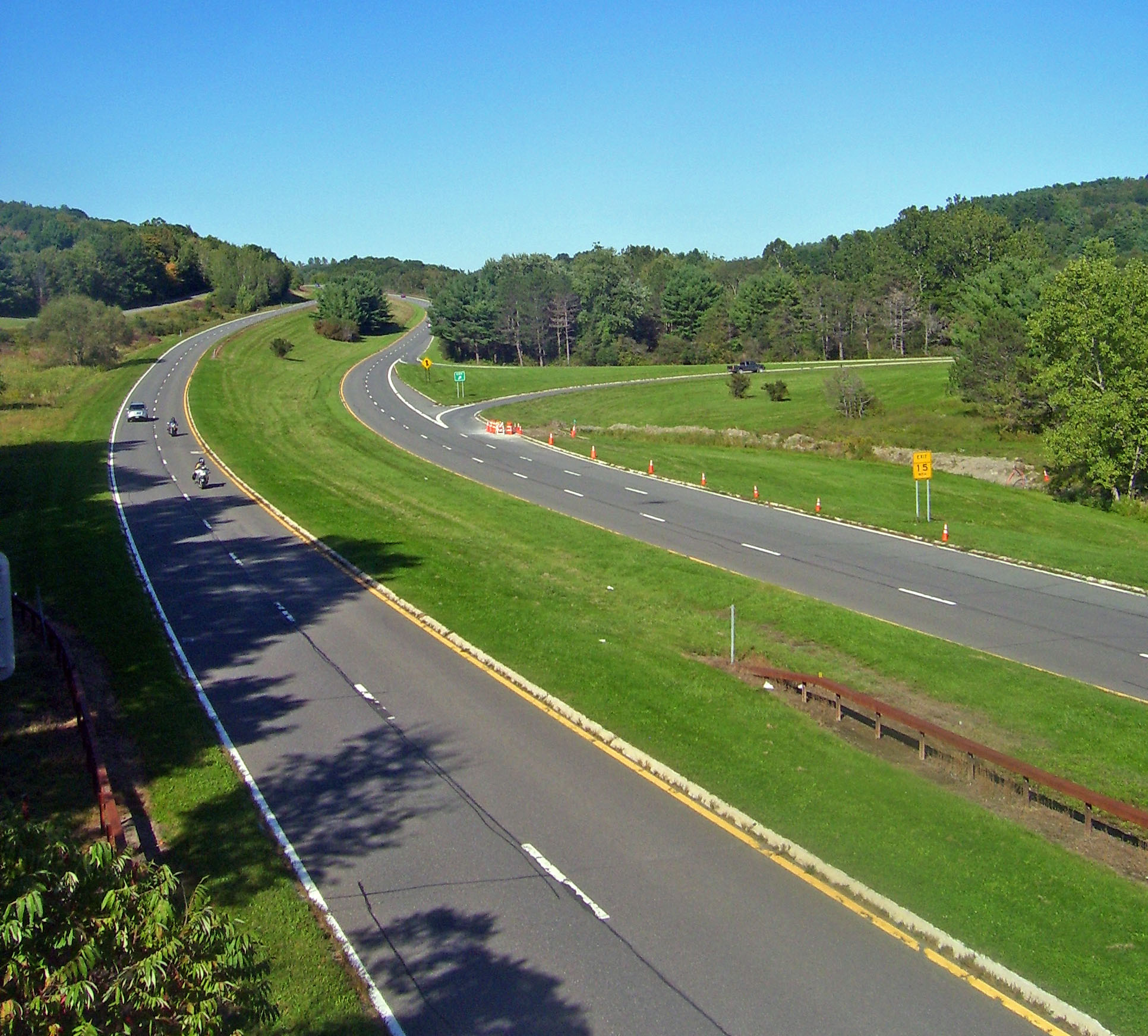
Birds-eye view of the Taconic at the NY 217 exit in Philmont

The parkway terrain in Columbia is similar to that in northern Dutchess, with more views opening up in the north as the road levels out. The surrounding farms and woods get more extensive. After entering the county, the Taconic continues due north through the town of Gallatin through unbroken woods. It bends slightly to the intersection with CR 8 to pass the beach at Lake Taghkanic State Park, with the access road for the park leaving to the east at grade from the northbound lanes where the highway enters the town of Taghkanic. Another half-mile (800 m) to the north is the second interchange with NY 82.

North of that exit, the parkway bends to the northeast again, paralleling the orientation of the county as a whole. It crosses briefly into the town of Claverack, then back into Taghkanic before reentering Claverack as it heads due east briefly, then north again into the NY 23 exit near the hamlet of Martindale. It bends from the northerly heading back to the northeast to cross into Philmont over the next three miles (4.8 km), where NY 217 comes to its eastern terminus at the exit with the Taconic.

Past a rise beyond that exit, there are scenic overlook parking areas on both sides of the highway with panoramic views west to the Catskills. The road curves into the town of Ghent, with two more at-grade intersections, one of which being Rigor Hill Road, which features a gas station right on the side of the parkway.

The Taconic continues to the north from here for five miles (8.0 km) more, crossing into the town of Chatham, with an exit for NY 203 shortly after. The parkway continues north through Chatham, where signs warn drivers that the NY 295 exit is the last before the Thruway tolls at the end of the road. The last exit for Rock City Road is open only to southbound traffic, allowing commercial vehicles that have ventured onto the parkway to exit. A toll gantry for exit B2 on the Berkshire Connector of the New York State Thruway (I-90), marks the administrative end of the Taconic State Parkway, 104 miles (167 km) from Kensico Circle.

== Scenery ==
Parkway scenery

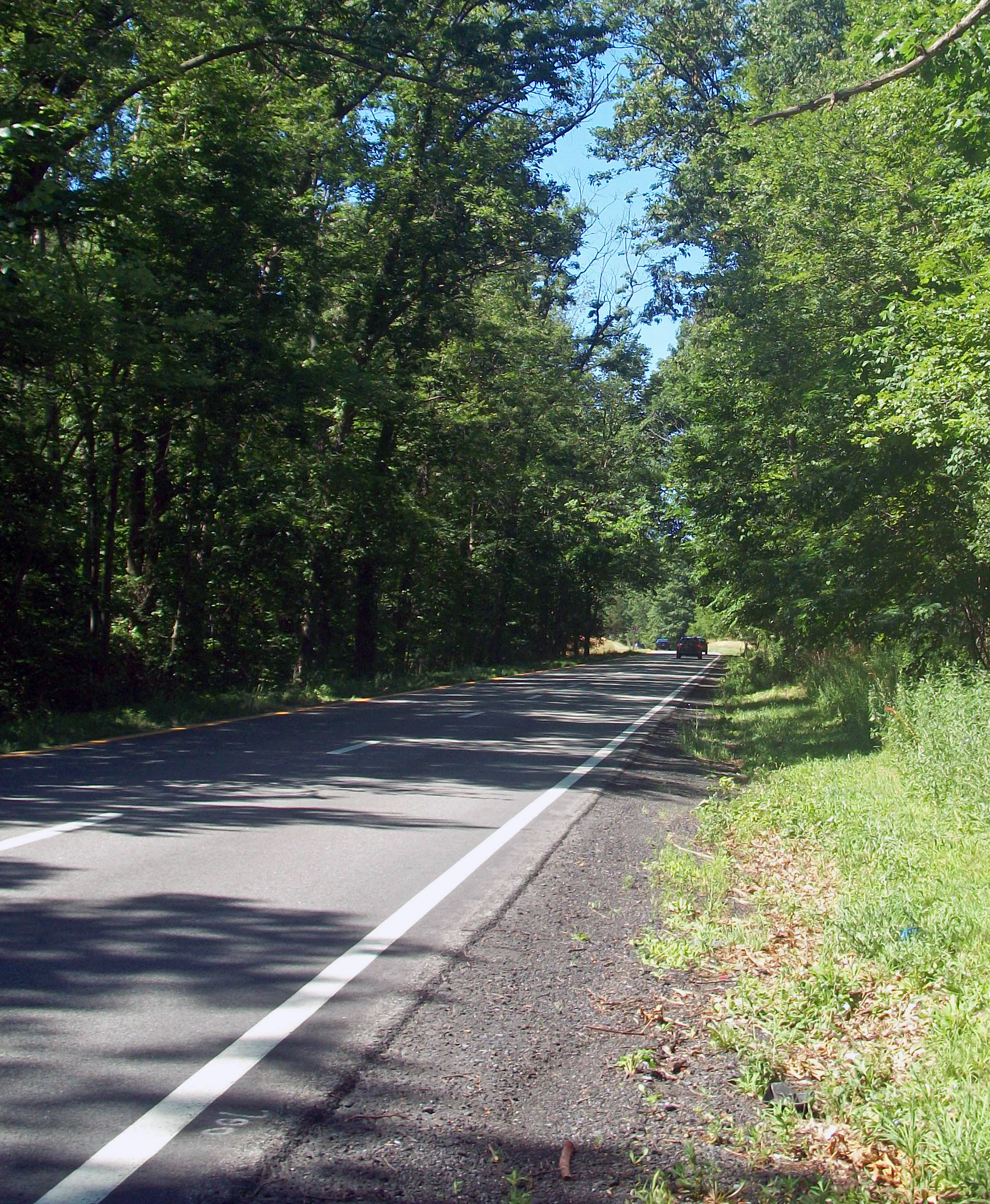
Trees overhanging the Taconic in LaGrange, Dutchess County

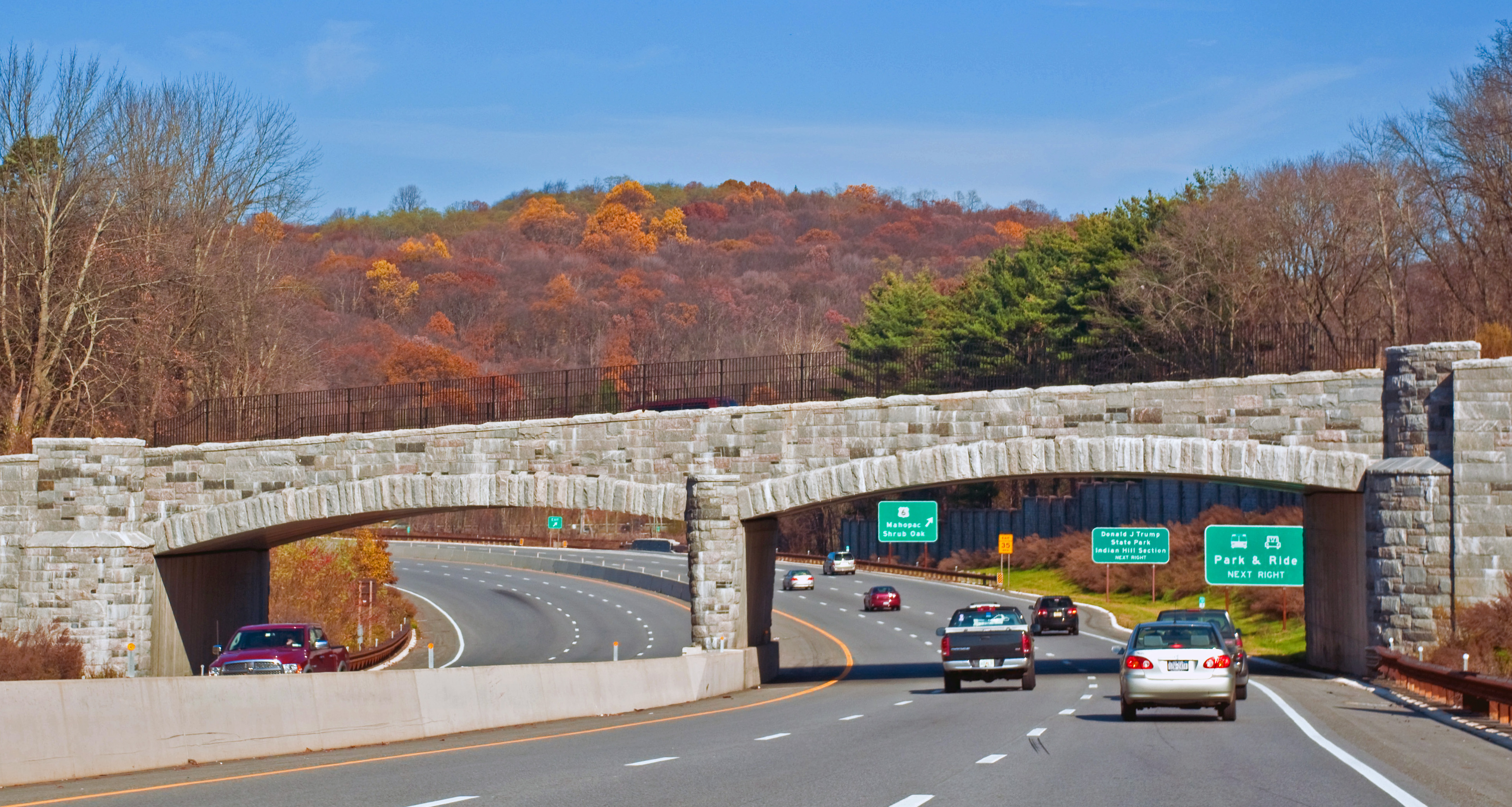
Stone overpass in Shrub Oak, Westchester County

Landscape architects such as Gilmore Clarke worked closely with engineers and construction crews during the Taconic's construction, often on site. Some features of the road's design address practical considerations and increase safety. Curves that climbed or descended were banked to increase vehicle traction and permit better drainage. Likewise the curves in undulating terrain are located to reduce blind spots at crests and keep the sharpest turns out of valleys. These also make sure that views of distant landscapes open up on downgrades and on long curves, when they are less distracting.

Closer to the road, on the northern sections in Columbia and Dutchess counties, the road was routed to showcase a nearby view of wooded hillside or a farm. Since trucks were not permitted on the road—for some time, this even included privately owned pickup trucks used solely for personal use—in many sections tree branches overhang the roadways, creating a park-like canopy. The curve of the northbound AMVETS Memorial Bridge over Croton Reservoir echoes the surrounding hills. On the medians and berms, plantings were carefully planned to maintain continuity with the surrounding woods. On the descent into Peekskill Hollow in Putnam Valley, the trees and shrubs above the retaining wall on the east side were transplanted from the path of the highway, which retained the appearance of the local forest and saved money. Overpasses, both carrying roads over the parkway and carrying it over roads, were faced in native stone. Grade intersections, usually a feature engineers tried to avoid, which initially helped keep local east–west routes open and connect the parkway to the landscape it traversed, have since either been closed or replaced by overpasses.

As a result, the Taconic has been the subject of much praise over the years not only for its vistas but for the way it harmonizes with the surrounding landscape. Sociologist Lewis Mumford, who often criticized the effect of superhighway construction on contemporary cities, always advised friends traveling up from New York to visit him at his house in Amenia that they should take the Taconic. He described it as "a consummate work of art, fit to stand on a par with our loftiest creations". The engineers, he said, had avoided "brutal assaults against the landscape." Albany-born novelist William Kennedy, whose family frequently drove the Taconic during his childhood to visit relatives farther south, called it "a 110-mile [180 km] postcard. It's the most beautiful road I've ever known—in all seasons." "You can drive it with confidence", said automotive writer David E. Davis. "There are no bad surprises about the way the road is engineered." Landscape architect Garret Eckbo called the Taconic "as lovely an integration of highway engineering and landscape architecture as one could hope to find". Commenting on this years later, architecture critic Matthew Gandy wrote:

Clarke's design for the Taconic State Parkway, for example, provides a vivid example of a new kind of mediation among nature, technology and society, with what appears to be a delicate balance between the new infrastructural project and an imaginary natural order. Implicit within this aesthetic dialectic is the notion of engineering as an art form that can in some way embellish or even improve upon nature: there is no radical disjuncture here but a sense of aesthetic progression and purity of form.

In the late 20th and early 21st centuries, with sections of the road modified from its original design and the rest areas mostly gone, writers for The New York Times have variously described the Taconic as "a pleasure to use, evoking those bygone days when people went for a drive just for the fun of it" and "unquestionably among the most scenic roadways in the Northeast, winding along the Hudson Valley with a painter's eye for landscape and a gearhead's idea of fun." The Lonely Planet New York State guidebook calls it a "highway masterpiece".

== Engineering ==
The parkway's engineering principles evolved over the four decades it took to build, with northern sections reflecting improvements in construction technology and lessons learned from the early days of construction. Some aspects of the original road remained consistent from end to end.

The Westchester County sections were laid out by the county's parks commission based on the parkways they had already designed. Its engineers later worked on the design of the upper sections. In its early days, the Taconic State Parks Commission (TSPC) lacked the money to hire a full engineering staff, in spite of terrain that presented some major challenges. Its engineer, E.J. Howe, on loan from the state's Department of Public Works (DPW), frequently complained about the commission's directive that he plan a route only where it had the land or expected to buy it, instead of planning a route and then buying the land. He also began negotiations with landowners, and his position was eliminated from the commission's budget after three years. His successor clashed with his superiors as well, and after he left in 1933 the commission relied on state DPW engineers for the rest of the construction.

Most of the original parkway was surfaced in reinforced concrete. Officials favored it despite its higher initial cost as compared to asphalt since it was less likely to need repair over its 50-year lifespan and reflected more light at night, improving safety. Asphalt was used for repaving of segments to the south; today the original concrete remains only between the US 44 and northern NY 82 exits.

The changes in the design of the northern Taconic also reflect higher speeds that mid-century automobiles were capable of, and improvements in construction technology. The track-equipped steam shovels that broke ground for the first section in Putnam County in 1931 were the most advanced excavators of the time. Over the next decade, the cost of moving a cubic yard dropped to almost half of what it had been in the early 1920s. Later in the parkway's development, engineers began using aerial photographs to plan the route.

The road's drainage system had some special features designed to avoid detracting from its scenic qualities. The roadway was crowned, with storm drain grates at the edge since there was no shoulder, to keep water from forming deep puddles that could cause accidents (these have been eliminated from modernized sections of the parkway in Westchester). The soft hand-fluted curbs also helped channel runoff to the basins, and in the median strips a central trench took water to underground pipes which drain into local streams.

The median strips themselves were not part of the original design on the lower sections of the Taconic, save for sections like Fahnestock State Park where designers used them to enhance the scenic capabilities of the road and create recreational opportunities. As the road was extended north during the 1930s, it became clear that the wider medians improved safety without sacrificing beauty, and starting with the NY 52 exit in East Fishkill they were made a standard element of the parkway's design. Wider medians were also a lot easier to build in Dutchess and Columbia counties, as the land is much flatter than in Putnam County. When the parkway was modernized and widened in Westchester County, wide medians were installed for most of the length between the Sprain Brook Parkway and the Putnam County line.

== History ==
The Taconic came into being as a result of the increasing presence of the automobile in American society and the demand for more public parks near crowded cities. Two separate agencies, the Taconic State Park Commission (TSPC) and Westchester County Parks Commission (WCPC), were its initial constructors, building different segments. In time a state authority would take over from them both, and then 18 years later itself yield up to its current administrator, the state Department of Transportation.

It would take nearly four decades to complete from the initial parkway proposal by TSPC chair Franklin D. Roosevelt in 1925 to the opening of the last segment in 1963, due in part to a lengthy hiatus resulting from World War II. Construction technology and highway design standards changed during the construction of the road, changes whose effect is still visible to drivers today. Since its completion it has been renovated, particularly in Dutchess and Westchester counties, reflecting the change in its role from park access route and scenic drive to important regional transportation artery.

=== Background ===
Immigration and industrialization caused a major increase in New York City's population in the late 19th and early 20th centuries. In the summertime, many of these newer residents began looking for places to get away from the hot city and the densely populated tenements they lived in. The city's own parks and beaches were often overcrowded. Automobiles became more affordable, and by 1917 there were more cars than horses in the city. Drivers began taking to low-quality roads in search of parks outside the city, but were often disappointed after long drives to find that most of those parks were closed to nonresidents.

In 1900, New York and New Jersey had jointly acquired the Palisades, the cliffs along the west side of the Hudson in both states, to protect them from further damage due to quarrying. Making it a park for city residents had not been part of the plan, but it quickly became one. Its success as a park led to the establishment of the Palisades Interstate Park Commission and the construction of Palisades Interstate Parkway to allow nonstop drives through scenic and wooded areas through Palisades Park up to the Bear Mountain Bridge.

During his successful campaign for the State Senate in 1910, Roosevelt had toured the district in a car, still not common in the area, the first candidate to do so. He became more interested in the possibilities of automobile touring ten years later when, paralysis resulting from polio having cost the effective use of his legs, Roosevelt began frequently taking his friends on such trips around the region. He began pondering the idea of a north–south parkway through the eastern Hudson Valley.

In 1922, as part of its political reform efforts, the New York State Association (NYSA) published A State Park Plan For New York, the first such comprehensive plan for any state's parks. New York's few parks at that time had been managed by a loose combination of public and private interests, and all the land had been donated to the state since the legislature would not appropriate money for any park outside a city.

The plan's author, NYSA secretary Robert Moses, combined the ideas of association researchers into a document that transformed park planning. It was primarily a statewide plan for acquiring and protecting other large tracts of natural resources not currently in public ownership through a $15 million ($227 million in 2025) bond issue, an amount far in excess of any previously proposed. A subsequent revision proposed the coordination of state park management and development through various regional park commissions, centralized under a State Council of Parks (SCP), itself to be part of the Conservation Department. It advocated the construction of parkways to make these areas accessible to nearby cities via automobile and that areas be developed not only for conservation but also for active outdoor recreation.

When the bond issue was put to voters in 1924, the reaction was uniformly positive. The legislation creating the administrative structure of the state parks was drafted by Moses. The legislation gave the SCP director considerable power. The legislature passed the bill unanimously in 1924. The bond issue passed overwhelmingly that fall.

=== Taconic Parkway plan ===
Roosevelt was appointed chair of the newly created TSPC. It was expected to focus on the creation of a tri-state park along with Connecticut and Massachusetts, to protect and develop the mountainous area around the tripoint where the three states meet (today Taconic State Park). Other than that it had no obvious goals. The 1922 plan had not identified any areas in Columbia or Dutchess counties to protect as parks, and the area's major scenic resources, the Catskills and Taconics, were largely outside its borders. At its third meeting, Roosevelt proposed the commission design and build a parkway along the following route:

Approximately midway between Albany Post Road and the Harlem River Valley and coming out on the west side of Shenandoah Valley, passing thence east of East Fishkill, east of Hopewell, east of Arthursburg, east of Billings, east of Moores Mill, east of Washington Hollow, east of Stanfordville, west of Bangall to the south end of Stissing Mountain, thence over the top of Stissing Mountain through Silvermalls and past Charlotte Lake, thence approximately in a straight line to Philmont and past Chatham, with the idea that at some point north of Chatham would be divide and one fork would lead northeast to Williamstown and the Mohawk Trail and the other fork northwest passing east of Troy, to the Saratoga Battlefield.

Moses had already proposed an alternate route at the first meeting of the commission, which Roosevelt missed. He would have the parkway avoid the rugged terrain of central Putnam County and instead follow the Hudson from the Bear Mountain Bridge up to Cold Spring, where it would then go northeast to the Tri-State Park. That would allow it to pass through a scenic area along the river but created other issues for engineering and land acquisition. The two men lobbied their colleagues for their routes.

Roosevelt eventually won, pointing to a new state highway planned to run north from the bridge (today's US 9W) and that a more direct route would better serve recreational traffic from the city. His was the plan initially adopted by the TSPC and approved by the SCP in July 1925, several months later. Moses relented, but reportedly said the parkway should extend only a few miles north of the city. Roosevelt is reported to have said later the parkway would extend north through the Adirondacks to the Canada–US border - a north–south freeway link of sorts that avoided the Adirondacks in starting slightly west of the TSP's northern terminus, yet still reached the international border was achieved by the end of August 1967 with the completion of the Adirondack Northway (I-87).

=== Bronx River Parkway Extension plan ===
The WCPC had built 70 miles (113 km) of parkways on its own by the time the bond issue passed, retaining the services of landscape architect Gilmore Clarke for the latter. One of its most successful had been a joint project with New York City, the Bronx River Parkway, which followed the south Bronx River north from Soundview in the Bronx 19 miles (31 km) to public picnic grounds at Kensico Dam.

The road had first been proposed in 1895. In 1924 the parkway opened and was instantly popular. Its design was widely emulated on parkways in New York and elsewhere.

The WCPC had begun considering another idea of Moses's, that the Bronx River Parkway could be extended north to the new Bear Mountain Bridge, at the time the only bridge over the Hudson River south of Poughkeepsie. Motorists could thus make a 125-mile (201 km) day trip from the city to the Hudson Highlands and back via the Palisades Parkway (which would soon connect directly into the city at the George Washington Bridge).

Two routes were considered for the extension. A western one took it past Briarcliff Manor; an eastern alternative was closer to Pleasantville and Chappaqua. Clarke recommended the western one for its scenery and cheaper land. He also noted that while both crossed the Croton River, the eastern one did so at the reservoir's narrowest point, reducing the costs of a bridge.

It was universally agreed by all the agencies involved—the SCP, TSPC and WCPC—that the Taconic Parkway should extend south of Roosevelt's route through Putnam County and connect to the Bronx River Parkway extension at the former's southern terminus. The TSPC would build from the Putnam County line onwards.

=== Construction ===
==== 1925–1928, route planning and land acquisition ====
Throughout the late 1920s, both park commissions focused on land acquisition and planning. The WCPC was adequately funded with proceeds from the bond issue and other sources, and was able to accomplish both tasks with relative ease. That was not the case with the TSPC, for several reasons.

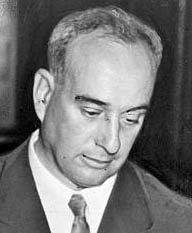
Robert Moses

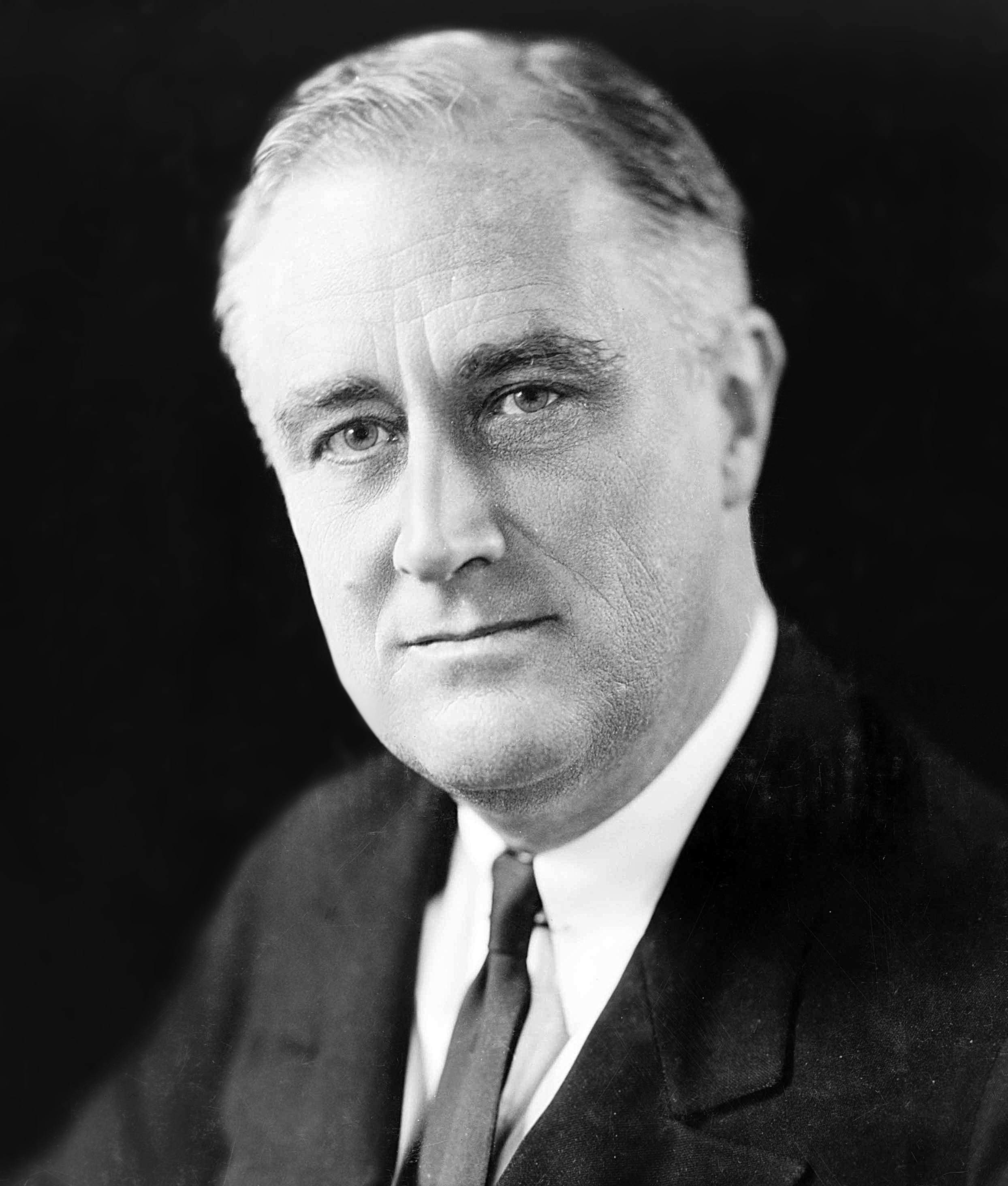
Franklin D. Roosevelt

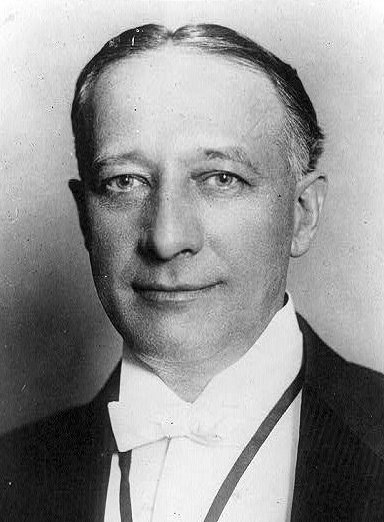
Al Smith

The greatest was the animosity between Moses and Roosevelt. The latter had hired his longtime associate Louis Howe as the TSPC's secretary at a salary of $5,000 (equivalent to $93,932 in 2025). Moses, as SCP head, was responsible for preparing the council's budget and submitting it to the Conservation commissioner. He told Roosevelt that if he wanted "a secretary and a valet" he would have to pay for it personally.

Roosevelt never forgave him for this remark, and Moses later said that this incident was the root of the antipathy between them that lasted into Roosevelt's later presidency. Moses, who also served as New York's Secretary of State for two years during this period, used his influence with the legislature and control of the parks budgeting process to keep the TSPC's finances low enough that it could barely maintain existing facilities under its jurisdiction, much less acquire right-of-way or hire staff.

Other regions and their plans, particularly Moses's domain on Long Island, were well funded. He, and his political patron Smith, felt that the TSPC should focus not on the parkway but the Tri-State Park, which Moses and Smith believed Roosevelt's commission had neglected, along with the donated property that has since become Fahnestock State Park. Moses also wanted to make sure that money was available for the parkways he was building on Long Island.

Roosevelt at one point wrote Smith an angry letter complaining that Moses had "skinned us alive" by allegedly lying to the governor and other officials about the TSPC. By early 1928 Roosevelt told the governor that he and the other TSPC commissioners had no choice but to resign if they were to continue to be so poorly served. Later that year the lack of funds, along with resistance from local property owners, led the commission to abandon Roosevelt's original hope of routing the parkway over Stissing Mountain.

Smith dissuaded Roosevelt from doing so. The situation was resolved later that year, when Roosevelt was elected governor after Smith resigned to become the Democratic nominee for president in the 1928 election. In that capacity Roosevelt could no longer serve on the TSPC but could make sure the parkway was built due to his final authority over the proposed state budget. He also rebuffed Smith's efforts to have him retain Moses as Secretary of State, although he could not remove him from the park posts.

==== 1929–1931: completion of Bronx River Parkway extension ====
In 1929 construction began on the WCPC section, with the connector to the Taconic getting underway the following year. In April 1931 steam shovels finally broke ground at Shrub Oak for the section built by the TSPC in Putnam County. Roosevelt and Moses both spoke at the ceremony, the former suggesting he still planned for the parkway to one day reach Canada. Eight months later the two rivals were at the north portal of the triple-hinged steel suspension bridge built over the reservoir, at 750 feet (230 m) the longest of that type in the world at the time, for the ribbon cutting ceremony. The next day, 20,000 cars took the new road from the city into the Manhattan Hills. Along the way were public picnic grounds in three areas, and 18 miles (29 km) of bridle paths in the median strip.

==== 1932–1935: Putnam County ====
They could not yet continue into Putnam County. Ernest Fahnestock had donated the first 2,241 acres (907 ha) of the park named for his late brother. Further north, the TSPC had also acquired Lake Taghkanic and 172 acres (70 ha) around it for development when the parkway eventually reached it. But land prices were rising in Putnam County as a result of the parkway, and the county's Board of Supervisors told the state's Department of Public Works (BPW) that it would not support the parkway since they believed the county had enough roads as it was. As a result, the engineers were told to only survey property once it had been acquired, a policy that they found difficult to follow.

The stretch of road descending into Peekskill Hollow was very problematic. Roosevelt feared that route would take the parkway too far east. It offered a view into the valley as it descended, but to preserve existing rock outcrops it was necessary to route it so that it descended at an 8.5% grade and make the roadway so narrow that there was only a foot (30.5 cm) between the curb and the wall on either side.

The engineering challenges it posed resulted in that stretch costing ten times as much to build as the four miles (6.4 km) to its south had. It was necessary to move 97,000 cubic yards (74,000 m^{3}) of earth and replant 196 trees and 456 shrubs from the right-of-way to the edges. They were joined by 450 more shrubs on the slope above the road, primarily rhododendron and mountain laurel. Roosevelt, still taking an interest in the parkway, forced changes in the stonework of the Peekskill Hollow Road overpass to be more consistent with local architectural traditions. The bridge also had to be re-engineered due to the swampy ground.

Soil difficulties north of Mohansic Lake were making it difficult for the WSPC to complete its section as well. It was finished in late 1932, and paving began on the TSPC's section the following year. The first 2.4 miles (3.9 km) had to be completely redone when the concrete slabs froze in place over the winter due to inadequately built drainage. Bridle paths along the median in this section, to Route 301 and Fahnestock State Park, were opened in 1933. After it was paved with its initial layer, it was opened to the public temporarily on Fourth of July weekend in 1935. It was opened permanently several weeks later after the fine work was done.

==== 1935–1939: southern Dutchess County ====
Some land for the Taconic State Parkway in Pleasant Valley was acquired in early 1932. The TSPC took advantage of several New Deal programs that Roosevelt had established upon being elected president in 1932. Funds provided under the National Industrial Recovery Act were used to build the road, while Civilian Conservation Corps (CCC) workers based in camps at the commission's state parks improved the parks and landscaping along the highway. Roosevelt himself was no longer involved as actively as he had been in state office, but continued to make occasional suggestions, such as the location of picnic areas in Columbia County. He also took a widely publicized drive from his home in Hyde Park to the site of the 1939 New York World's Fair in 1938 that brought publicity to the new highway.

With Roosevelt preoccupied by his presidential responsibilities, his successor as TSPC chair, Francis Masters Jr., cultivated relationships with area state legislators. Assemblyman D. Mallory Stephens of Putnam County, and Senator Charles Bontecou in Dutchess, became strong supporters of the parkway. They helped secure funding when a veto by governor Herbert Lehman in 1937 threatened to postpone paving for the next segment, to NY 52 in Dutchess County.

That interchange marked a change in the parkway's design reflecting an evolution within the engineering community. Previously the parkway had been mostly undivided, with medians only in a few places where necessary. This, a practice of the WSPC, had helped save land acquisition costs. But increasingly medians proved to be safer and more scenic. The segment between routes 52 and 82 at Arthursburg was the first designed as a fully divided parkway, with a continuous median. For the rest of the Taconic's construction, the roadways would come together only when necessary, at bridges and grade intersections.

Land acquisition had presented some problems, with some landowners attempting to profiteer and others reneging on earlier donation agreements since the price of land in the parkway's path had gone up. The commissioners used their power of eminent domain sparingly, despite Moses's recommendations to the contrary, preferring to negotiate with local landowners since they, too, were longtime residents of the region. A 500-acre (200 ha) land donation from James Baird, an engineer whose firm had built the Lincoln Memorial in Washington, led to the creation of James Baird State Park along the parkway in LaGrange.

Farmers, some of whom had received grade crossings to ensure that they could cross the parkway to their lands, nevertheless complained that they couldn't take their own families for a ride on the road, since they often owned pickup trucks as their primary vehicles, which were not allowed on the road as commercial vehicles until decades later, as privately licensed or "combination-plated" vehicles. Local governments also saw the parkway as offering little benefit to their transportation needs, since it avoided the settlements in the region and could not handle commercial vehicles. The commission did not help matters by aggressively opposing paralleling road projects, on the grounds that it would spoil the views from the highway.

The next section of the Taconic, north to NY 55, nine miles (14 km) east of Poughkeepsie, opened in late 1939. That year, Roosevelt wrote the commission with another suggestion, that an extension be built westward to Hyde Park. The commission also acquired Lake Taghkanic, the next park it proposed for the parkway.

==== 1941–1949: the war years ====
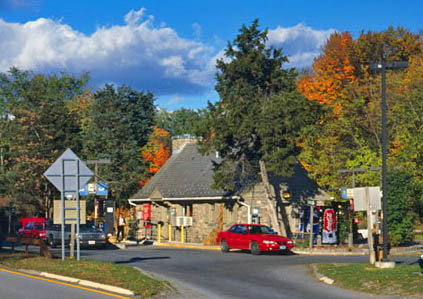
The Shenandoah service station, now closed, in 1999

The Poughkeepsie connection allowed traffic to access the new Mid-Hudson Bridge, making the Taconic a more vital link in the state road network. In 1940 traffic counts increased heavily, showing that the parkway was now being used for more than the weekend pleasure trips it was originally intended for. The TSPC erected two more service areas, Shenandoah north of Hosner Mountain Road, and Todd Hill Road, to accommodate the increased traffic. The commission also closed (permanently, as it turned out) the bridle paths along the median strip in Putnam County, unsure about how it would pay for them.

In 1941, two developments occurred with a major impact on the highway. Early that year, Assemblyman Stephens introduced a bill similar to the one Lehman had vetoed four years earlier. This time it passed, giving the TSPC not only the $3.6 million (equivalent to $60.7 million in 2025) to extend the parkway to Columbia County but putting the Westchester sections, including the entire Bronx River Parkway extension and the planned Bear Mountain Parkway, under the commission's jurisdiction. Later that year the U.S. entered World War II, putting a halt to actual construction for the duration.

The War Department designated the Taconic a military highway, requiring it to be open for troop movements. It also deemed the Croton Reservoir bridge strategically important and had it protected by armed guards. The commission lowered the speed limit from 40 to 30 mph (65 to 50 km/h) to conserve fuel, limited maintenance to snow removal and mowing and kept streetlights off everywhere except the bridge throughout the war. The speed limit on the section from Valhalla to Hawthorne was increased back to 40 mph until 1962.

Planning continued for the northern Dutchess stretch, to be built after the war. With the enforced break in construction, and its new authority over the entire road, the commission began to look at ways to improve what had already been built, especially in light of the road's growing role as a regional artery. The Hawthorne Circle, where the Taconic, Saw Mill River Parkway and NY 100 intersected, was the major problem. It had become a magnet for accidents and congestion. A 1944 study recommended it be replaced with a three-level grade-separated interchange.

The study also suggested eliminating some of the more dangerous grade intersections in Westchester as well. Without the money to build new exits, the TSPC settled for larger stop signs on the intersecting roads. It would seek the money for the interchanges after the war.

The road's northern terminus had still not been settled. In 1942 state highway commissioner H.O. Schermerhorn suggested it might be more useful if the road veered west north of Chatham towards Albany to connect to a proposed bridge over the Hudson there. The TSPC inspected the proposed route and found it would be very expensive to acquire and build, and in 1943 Schermerhorn agreed that the Taconic should continue on its planned course northwards. Three years later, in 1946, the commission also considered the Hyde Park extension proposed by the recently deceased Roosevelt, but dropped it as construction was resuming with the end of the war.

Paving had begun that year to Clinton Corners, but the commission became embroiled in controversy over Lake Taghkanic further north. In the two decades since the TSPC had bought the property, more cottages had been built along the lake. It would be necessary to condemn 110 of them to follow the proposed route 225 feet (69 m) west of the lake, similar to how the parkway had been built at Mohansic Lake to allow for a view from the road. The owners objected, and were able to persuade their state legislators to introduce a bill requiring a new parkway alignment at least 750 feet (230 m) west of the lake and prohibiting the commission from acquiring any property along it or constructing any of the road north of Route 199 until it had acquired a new route. Governor Thomas E. Dewey signed it into law in 1946 over Moses's objections, delaying planning for two years.

Dewey also advocated the construction of a statewide "thruway" system of limited-access divided highways that would, unlike the parkways, be designed for buses and trucks as well as automobiles and serve commercial needs. Part of the system was a proposed "Berkshire Thruway" which would be the Taconic's northern terminus, even as the commission was studying a route through Rensselaer County to the north.

State highway money was increasingly diverted to planning the thruway system. The proposed Berkshire Thruway terminus gave the TSPC renewed vigor in continuing construction, but meant that it had to abandon plans for a connection to the Tri-State Park, its original mandate. In October 1949, Dewey cut the chain on the section between Routes 55 and 199.

==== 1950–1963: Columbia County ====
As the designers and builders pushed north into Columbia County, connecting Lake Taghkanic State Park at last to the parkway, they took advantage of the more open and rolling terrain to improve the road's scenic possibilities. Medians averaged 100 feet (30 m) in width, and it was easier to include views of the distant Catskills. Curves were generally wider than they had been in Dutchess County. A service station was built in the median at the park, and a scenic overlook at CR 8.

Dewey again presided at the opening of the link from Route 199 to 82 in October 1954. He expressed pride in having gotten the parkway out of Dutchess County at last under his tenure. He also called for parkway designers to straighten the roads out, and praised the Thruway, then under construction on the opposite side of the river. Moses, in his speech, recalled Roosevelt's original hope to build the parkway all the way to Canada, the idea he had opposed three decades before. It did not appear likely that this would happen in any event, between the likely end of the Taconic at the Berkshire section of the Thruway and the recently announced plan to build the Adirondack Northway from Albany to Canada as part of the new Interstate Highway System.

Grading of the next section, to reach NY 23, had begun a month before the ceremony. When it was completed in summer 1956, paving was delayed because the money had not been released due to disagreement over whether to continue the use of concrete or asphalt. This was settled in favor of concrete and paving began in spring of 1957.

Asphalt proved less expensive, and it was used again when the next and last section of the Taconic to the Thruway was paved in the early 1960s. During this time another governor, Nelson Rockefeller, proposed that management of the road be turned over to a new entity, the East Hudson Parkway Authority (EHPA), along with all the other Westchester parkways since the debt the county had incurred building and maintaining them was becoming a financial burden. The new authority would oversee a $50 million (equivalent to $416 million in 2025) rehabilitation program.

The TSPC was opposed to the new plan. Its commissioners feared that their greatest work would pass to the control of an agency for which it would be just one of many responsibilities, and that it would be necessary to make the Taconic a toll road in order to pay for the improvements planned. When the bill passed and the EHPA was created, with most of its members from Westchester, Columbia County residents feared the road would never be completed. The TSPC was allowed to operate the Taconic through 1962, by agreement with the EHPA, since the former's budget was already in place.

When it took over, the EHPA established the toll gate at the Thruway as the northern limit of its jurisdiction, ending any plans that some of the TSPC commissioners had had of continuing at least to US 20 a short distance to the north. An opening ceremony celebrating the completion of the road after almost four decades was planned for November 25, 1963. The parkway opened as scheduled, but the ceremony was canceled due to the assassination of President John F. Kennedy three days earlier.

=== Improvements and reconstruction ===
==== 1961–1979, EHPA administration ====
As early as its 1941 study the TSPC had had documentary evidence that some sections of the parkway, particularly in Westchester, were already outmoded. After the war, it had had to put most of the money it was now competing with the interstate system for into finishing the road. It was able to make one improvement, eliminating the grade intersection at Underhill Road in 1954. Clarke designed a new bridge architecturally sympathetic to those built in the early 1930s.

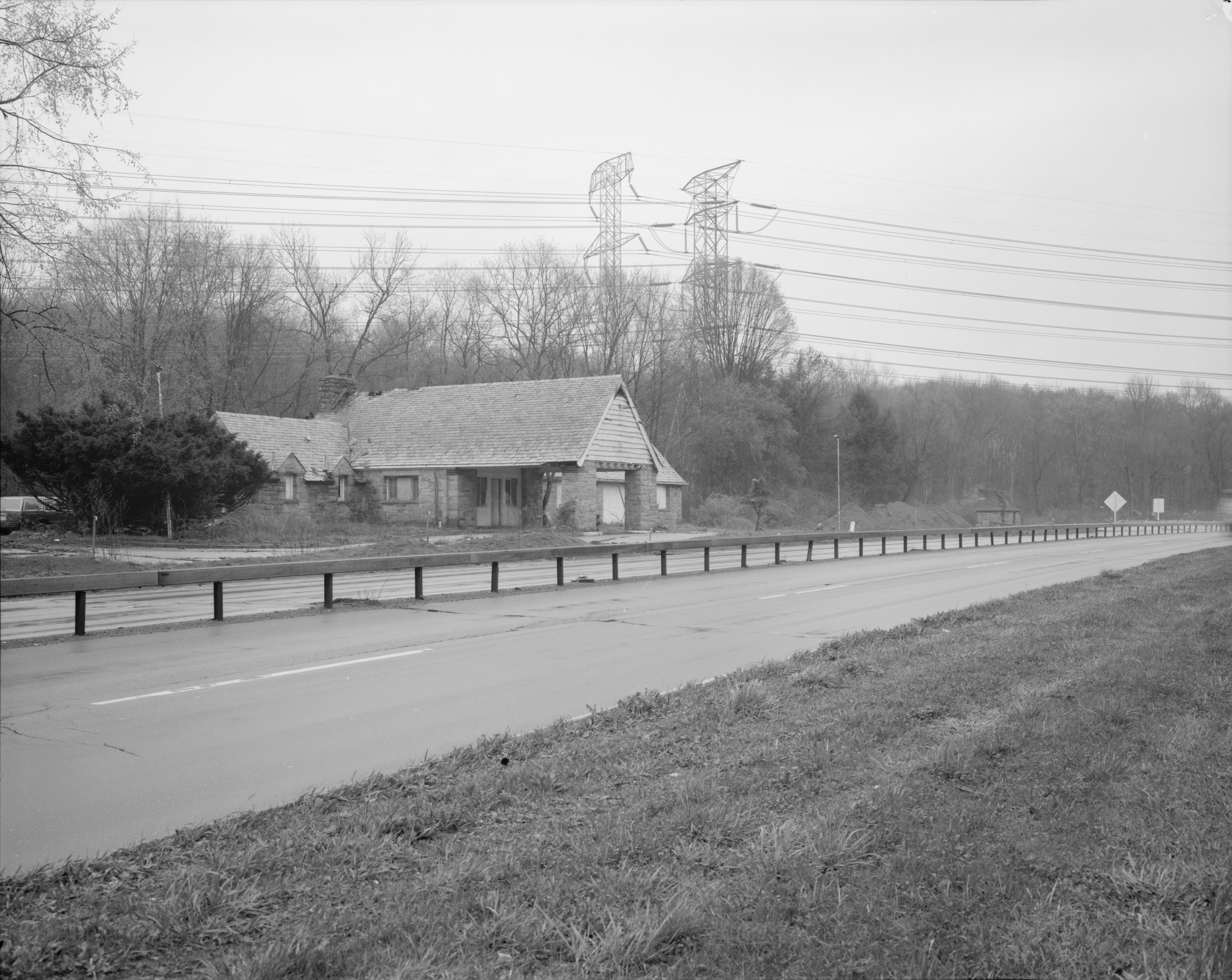
Briarcliff Wells service station, since demolished

The TSPC had also planned to realign the road at Lake Mohansic and replace the grade intersection with an interchange. In 1962, while the commission was finishing the northern section of the Taconic, the EHPA began that project. The original parkway became the northbound roadway and a new southbound one was built. The EHPA's improvements made the road safer and more efficient for the commuters who now used it, but changed the character of the road, widening it and replacing its concrete pavement with asphalt and its wooden guardrails with steel ones that were allowed to rust in order to approximate the color of their predecessors. In 1964, I-84 was built through Dutchess and Putnam counties, giving the middle of the Taconic a controlled-access intersecting route that made it possible to access the Danbury and Newburgh areas via the parkway.

Other EHPA improvements included the replacement of the Hawthorne Circle with an interchange and the construction of the new southbound bridge at Croton Reservoir. The 1,362-foot (415 m) steel truss bridge was named the most beautiful medium-span low-clearance bridge of 1970 by the American Institute of Steel Construction.

Moving north from Westchester, the authority sought to improve the Peekskill Hollow section, which had been so difficult to build initially. It had the highest accident rate on the Taconic, with 18 fatalities in 1965–66. The trees and cliffs kept the sun off the road, making it icy in wintertime. The EHPA planned to reconstruct a 3-mile (4.8 km) section in Yorktown in 1966, and it announced plans for a metal barrier in the middle of the road in 1967. It also planned another southbound roadway as much as 1.5 miles (2.4 km) to the west.

Residents of the area objected to the effect it would have on Fahnestock State Park. They also feared that the hamlet of Tompkins Corners, and other residents in the area, would become isolated in a large median strip. It would also be necessary to condemn a popular summer camp for city children that had been displaced to the area when the Thruway was routed through its original land in Orange County. Due to this opposition, the EHPA abandoned any plans for a realignment around Peekskill Hollow.

In 1979, with Westchester's parkways adequately upgraded, the EHPA dissolved itself and turned control of all its roads, including the Taconic, over to the Department of Public Works' successor, the state Department of Transportation (NYSDOT). The new operator established the Westchester Parkways Commission for public input and planned a program to continue the rehabilitation and upkeep of the parkways.

==== 1979–present: DOT administration ====
In 1980, the commuter-oriented Sprain Brook Parkway was completed to the Taconic, providing a higher-speed, signal-free means between it and the freeway portion of the Bronx River Parkway. DOT continued to remake the road in Westchester, where 90,000 vehicles used the parkway on an average day, reconfiguring exits, widening the roadways and putting asphalt over the original concrete, to the point that most of the parkway in the county bore little resemblance to its original appearance. The Taconic was designated a State Scenic Byway in 1992, and a multidisciplinary Corridor Management Plan was drafted and implemented seven years later to ensure that future changes to the road preserved and improved safety with minimal impact on its scenic and historic character. The next year the parkway was inventoried for the Historic American Engineering Record.

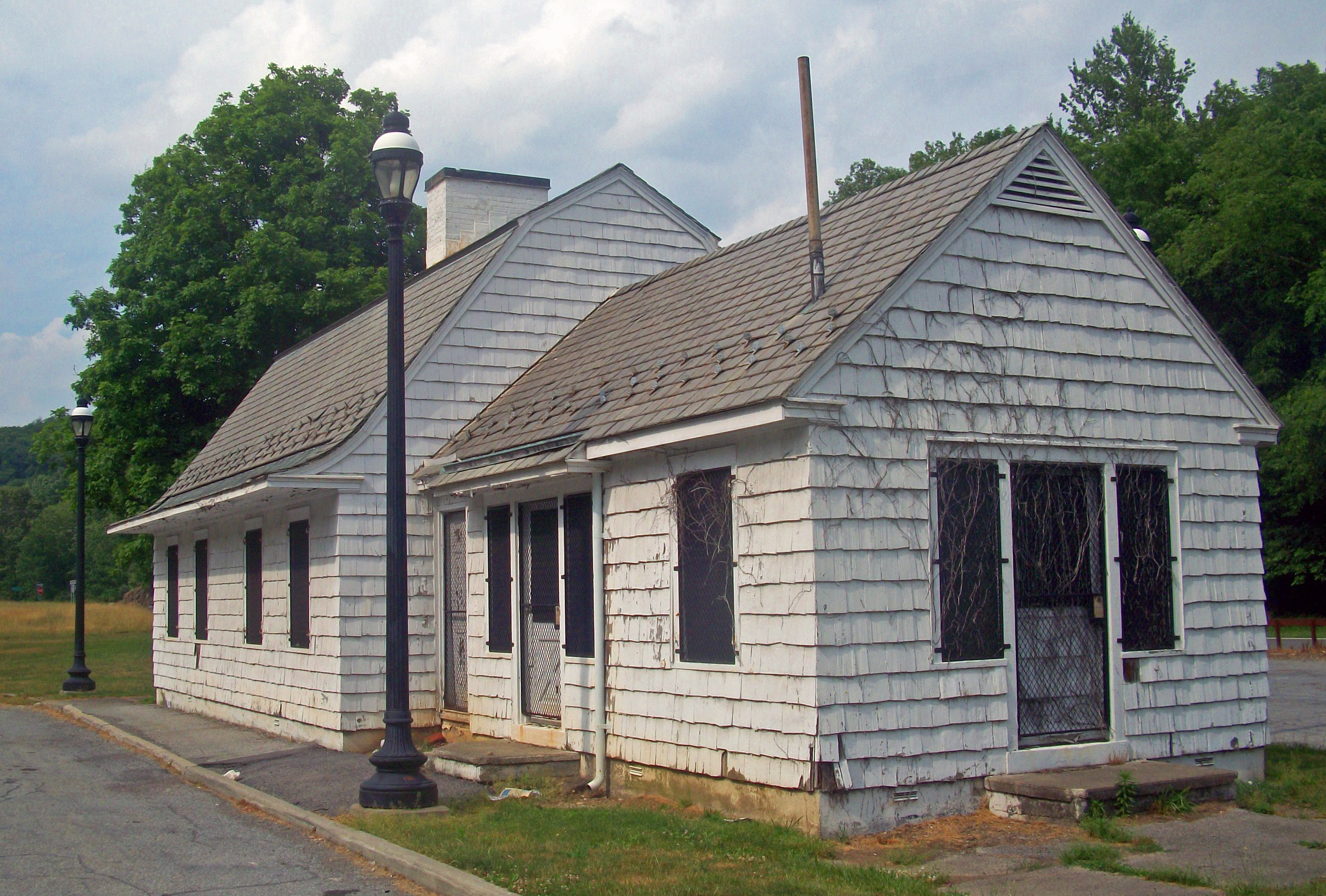
The closed Todd Hill rest stop building in 2010, since reopened as a Taste NY store

In the 21st century, DOT began addressing safety issues in Dutchess County, where traffic counts had increased by 7–11% annually since the 1970s. A 2003 task force report recommended action on many of the grade intersections, closing some completely while closing just the medians on others. Only the Salt Point Turnpike (NY 115) junction was spared.

There was some local controversy about the changes. Residents of some rural areas worried that the intersection closings would isolate them, and preservationists felt cell phone towers would detract from the scenic beauty along the parkway. Other residents welcomed the construction of noise barriers along sections that bordered near their homes.

There are no plans currently to modify any of the grade intersections north of Route 199, where use of the parkway has not significantly increased. The grade intersection at Pudding Street in Putnam County was replaced by a new diamond interchange between 2019 and 2021. The state had previously added turn lanes and widened the median so that a school bus would not block the road, but members of the county's Traffic Safety Board, including the sheriff, said that accidents were still too frequent. Similarly, there has been talk in Dutchess County of replacing the Carpenter Road intersection with an interchange.

When the parkway was listed on the National Register in late 2005, the entire right-of-way from Kensico Circle to the Thruway merge was included, creating a 7,067-acre (2,860 ha) linear historic district. These 11 square miles (28 km^{2}) make the parkway the third largest Register listing in the state. (Note: The Adirondack Park and Hudson River Historic District are the larger two.) The entire parkway, right-of-way and supporting buildings and structures were considered contributing except for the 15 miles (24 km) of rebuilt roadway between the former Hawthorne Circle and Crom Pond Road and 23 bridges in the southern three counties.

The parkway got another state park in 2006, when another wealthy individual donated land. Donald Trump had bought 436 acres (176 ha) along the east side of the road near the Westchester–Putnam county line in 1998, intending to develop it into a hotel and golf course. Local opposition was considerable, and he decided to donate the land to the state. It is now Donald J. Trump State Park, with separate parcels called Indian Hill and French Hill.

In July 2009, Diane Schuler of West Babylon crashed her van head-on into an oncoming sport utility vehicle (SUV) while driving south in the northbound lanes approximately 1.7 miles (2.7 km) north of the Pleasantville Road exit. Eight people, including Schuler and several children, were killed. The accident was the deadliest ever on the parkway, and the worst motor vehicle accident in Westchester County since 1934. Schuler was determined to have been driving under the influence of both alcohol and marijuana.

The road, which has a lower accident rate than average for New York, was not considered to be at fault. Some changes were nevertheless made. Two large "Wrong Way" signs were installed on the ramp she drove down. Westchester County Executive Andrew Spano ordered that signage at onramps on the Taconic and other parkways in the county be checked to make sure "there can be no question of whether you're entering or exiting." The state legislature passed Leandra's Law, making it a felony to drive while intoxicated with a passenger 16 or younger, partly as a result of the accident.

In the years 2009 and 2010, the existing rustic guide rails along the medians and edges of the parkway were systematically replaced with zinc-coated type guide rail. The existing rustic box beam, cable, and w-shape guide rails were replaced.

According to data compiled by the National Highway Traffic Safety Administration, the Taconic was the second-deadliest road in Dutchess County after US 9 between 1994 and 2008. New York State Police blamed travelers exceeding speed limits, wildlife crossings and trucks being directed onto the parkway by their GPS navigation devices. The state was planning to post more explicit signage making it clear that trucks are not allowed on parkways in New York.

== Exit list ==
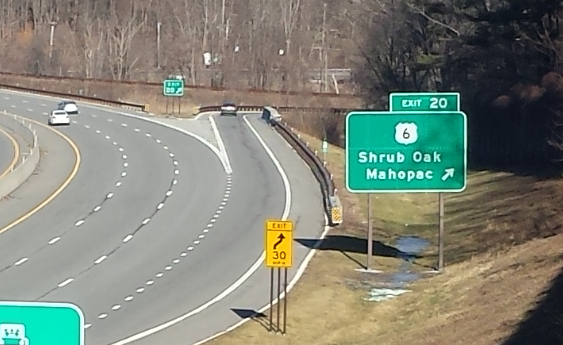
Mileage-based exit sign, implemented in 2016

Intersections and interchanges were formerly numbered sequentially with a single letter prefix indicating the county, with exit numbers resetting at county lines. Intersection numbers were posted on small tabs attached to the intersection sign, as opposed to on gore signs as on other limited-access highways. Numbering was not necessarily sequential, as some exits were removed or added after the parkway opened.

From 2016 to 2018, NYSDOT added mileage-based exit numbers. At-grade intersections were not numbered, though their signage was improved. The Taconic, which is the state's longest parkway, previously stood out for its lack of exit numbers ever since the county-based numbering system was removed in the late 1990s.

County	Location	mi	km	Old exit	New exit	Destinations	Notes
Westchester	North Castle	0.00	0.00		–	Bronx River Parkway south – White Plains	Continuation beyond Kensico Circle
Westchester	Valhalla	0.10	0.16	W1		Broadway to I-287 / NY 22	At-grade intersection; no southbound entrance; I-287/NY 22 not signed northbound
Westchester	Valhalla	0.40	0.64	W2		Cleveland Street – Valhalla Station	At-grade intersection
Westchester	Valhalla	0.45	0.72	W3		Valhalla Place	Northbound at-grade intersection
Westchester	Valhalla	0.50	0.80	W4		Legion Drive	Intersection replaced with overpass
Westchester	Valhalla	1.20	1.93	W5		Lakeview Avenue – Kensico Cemetery, Sharon Gardens	At-grade intersection
Westchester	Valhalla	1.60	2.57	W6		Commerce Street	At-grade intersection
Westchester	Mount Pleasant	2.40	3.86	W7		Stevens Avenue – Mount Pleasant Station	At-grade intersection
Westchester	Hawthorne	2.85	4.59	Southern end of freeway			
Westchester	Hawthorne	2.85	4.59		2	Sprain Brook Parkway south – New York City	Southbound exit and northbound entrance; northern terminus of Sprain Brook Parkway
Westchester	Hawthorne	3.10– 3.80	4.99– 6.12	W8	2	NY 141 to NY 9A (NY 100) – Hawthorne	Northbound exit and southbound entrance
Westchester	Hawthorne	3.10– 3.80	4.99– 6.12		3	Saw Mill River Parkway – Brewster, Yonkers	Same-directional access only; exit 26 on Saw Mill River Parkway
Westchester	Mount Pleasant	4.00	6.44	W9	4	NY 117 – Sleepy Hollow, Pleasantville	Northbound exit and entrance
Westchester	Mount Pleasant	4.67	7.52	W10	5	NY 9A north / NY 100 north	Northbound exit and southbound entrance
Westchester	Briarcliff Manor	5.63	9.06	W11	6	Pleasantville Road – Briarcliff Manor, Pleasantville	
Westchester	Briarcliff Manor	7.00	11.27	W12		Chappaqua Road	Intersection replaced with overpass
Westchester	Millwood	8.30	13.36	W13		Campfire Road	Intersection eliminated
Westchester	Millwood	8.50	13.68	W14	8	NY 100 / NY 133 – Briarcliff Manor, Millwood	
Westchester	New Castle	9.80	15.77	W15	9	Pines Bridge Road	Northbound exit and southbound entrance
Westchester	Yorktown	10.84	17.45	W16	11	NY 134 – Ossining	Signed as exits 11A (east) and 11B (west) southbound
Westchester	Yorktown	12.00	19.31	W17		Illington Road	Intersection replaced with overpass
Westchester	Croton Reservoir	12.70– 12.90	20.44– 20.76	AMVETS Memorial Bridge			
Westchester	Yorktown	14.00	22.53	W18	13	Underhill Avenue – Croton-on-Hudson, Yorktown Heights	Former NY 131
Westchester	Yorktown	15.00	24.14	W19	14	Baldwin Road	Former NY 132A
Westchester	Yorktown	16.40	26.39	W20	16	Franklin D. Roosevelt State Park	
Westchester	Crompond	17.14	27.58	W21	17A	US 202 / NY 35 – Yorktown Heights	
Westchester	Crompond	17.36	27.94	W22	17B	Bear Mountain State Parkway west to US 202 west / NY 35 west – Peekskill	No northbound entrance; eastern terminus of Bear Mountain Parkway
Westchester	Shrub Oak	19.76	31.80	W23	19	NY 132 – Shrub Oak	Northbound exit and southbound entrance
Westchester	Shrub Oak	20.13	32.40	W24	20	US 6 – Mahopac, Shrub Oak	
Putnam	Putnam Valley–Carmel line	23.20	37.34	P1	23	Bryant Pond Road	
Putnam	Putnam Valley–Carmel line	24.30	39.11	P2		Bullet Hole Road	Intersection eliminated
Putnam	Putnam Valley–Carmel line	25.65	41.28	P3	25	Peekskill Hollow Road (CR 21)	
Putnam	Fahnestock State Park	28.10	45.22	P4	28	Pudding Street	
Putnam	Fahnestock State Park	28.40	45.71	P5		Wiccopee Road	Intersection eliminated
Putnam	Fahnestock State Park- Kent line	31.14	50.11	P6	31E-W	NY 301 – Carmel, Cold Spring	Signed as exits 31A (east) and 31B (west)
Putnam	Kent	33.30	53.59	P7		Hortontown Hill Road	Right-in/right-out connections only
Putnam	Kent	33.90	54.56	P8		North Knapp Court	Northbound at-grade intersection; signed as Knapp Road
Dutchess	East Fishkill	35.00	56.33	D1	35	Miller Hill Road	Location of Appalachian Trail crossing
Dutchess	East Fishkill	36.92	59.42	D2	37E-W	I-84 – Danbury, Newburgh	Site of former exit with Jackson Road; signed as exits 37A (east) and 37B (west); exits 52A-B on I-84
Dutchess	East Fishkill	37.60	60.51	D3		Hosner Mountain Road	Intersection replaced with overpass
Dutchess	East Fishkill	38.39	61.78	D4	38	NY 52 – Fishkill, Carmel	
Dutchess	East Fishkill	40.10	64.53	D5		Carpenter Road (CR 29)	Right-in/right-out connections only
Dutchess	East Fishkill	40.90	65.82	D6		Stormville Road	Intersection eliminated
Dutchess	East Fishkill	41.40	66.63	D7	41	CR 9 (Beekman Road) – Hopewell Junction, Sylvan Lake	
Dutchess	East Fishkill	42.2	67.9	D8		Bogardus Lane	Intersection eliminated
Dutchess	East Fishkill	43.69	70.31	D9	43E-W	NY 82 – Hopewell Junction, Arthursburg	Signed as exits 43A (east) and 43B (west)
Dutchess	LaGrange			D10	45	CR 42 west (Arthursburg Road) to CR 21 – LaGrange	Southbound exit and entrance; eastern terminus of CR 42; serves Hudson Valley Regional Airport
Dutchess	LaGrange			D10	45	CR 21 (Noxon Road) – LaGrange	Northbound exit only; serves Hudson Valley Regional Airport
Dutchess	LaGrange	46.25	74.43	Taste NY Store (formerly Todd Hill Rest Area)			
Dutchess	LaGrange	46.25	74.43	D11		Todd Hill Road	Right-in/right-out connections only
Dutchess	LaGrange	47.05	75.72	D12	47E-W	NY 55 – Pawling, Poughkeepsie	Signed as exits 47A (east) and 47B (west)
Dutchess	LaGrange	47.55	76.52	D13		Skidmore Road	Intersection eliminated
Dutchess	LaGrange	48.30	77.73	D14	48	James Baird State Park	Left exit northbound
Dutchess	LaGrange	49.65	79.90	D15		Mountain Road	At-grade intersection; no turns
Dutchess	LaGrange	50.50	81.27	D16		McDonnell Road	Southbound at-grade intersection
Dutchess	Pleasant Valley	52.00	83.69	D17		Rossway Road / Drake Road	At-grade intersection; Drake Road not signed northbound
Dutchess	Pleasant Valley	52.80	84.97	D18		Tyrrel Road	At-grade intersection
Dutchess	Pleasant Valley	53.75	86.50	D19		Forest Ridge Lane	At-grade intersection
Dutchess	Pleasant Valley	54.72	88.06	D20	54	US 44 – Poughkeepsie, Millbrook	
Dutchess	Clinton	57.60	92.70	D21		Hibernia Road	Right-in/right-out connections only
Dutchess	Clinton	57.80	93.02	D22		Hollow Road (CR 14 east)	Northbound at-grade intersection
Dutchess	Clinton	58.30	93.82	D23	58	NY 115 south / CR 17 north (Salt Point Turnpike) – Salt Point, Clinton Corners, Hyde Park	Northern terminus of NY 115; southern terminus of CR 17
Dutchess	Clinton	61.30	98.65	D24		Willow Lane	Southbound at-grade intersection
Dutchess	Stanford	62.80	101.07	D25		Nine Partners Road	Right-in/right-out connections only
Dutchess	Stanford	64.60	103.96	D26	64	CR 19 (Bulls Head Road) – Rhinebeck, Stanfordville	
Dutchess	Milan	65.80	105.89	D27		Willow Brook Road	Right-in/right-out connections only
Dutchess	Milan	66.40	106.86	D28		Cold Spring Road	Right-in/right-out connections only
Dutchess	Milan	67.75	109.03	D29	67	NY 199 – Pine Plains, Red Hook, Rhinebeck	
Dutchess	Milan	69.30	111.53	D30		North Road	At-grade intersection
Dutchess	Milan	70.30	113.14	D31		Wilbur Flats Road	At-grade intersection
Dutchess	Milan	70.98	114.23	D32		Ferris Lane	At-grade intersection
Dutchess–Columbia county line	Milan–Gallatin line	72.24	116.26	C1	72	CR 2 west / CR 50 east (Jackson Corners Road) – Elizaville, Ancram	Eastern terminus of CR 2; western terminus of CR 50
Columbia	Gallatin	73.10	117.64	C2		Ten Neighbors Road	At-grade intersection; dead end
Columbia	Gallatin	76.30	122.79	Parking area (no facilities)			
Columbia	Gallatin	78.30	126.01	C3		CR 15 / Lake Taghkanic Road – Lake Taghkanic State Park	At-grade intersection; CR 15 not signed; Lake Taghkanic State Park not signed northbound
Columbia	Taghkanic	78.60	126.49	C4		Lake Taghkanic State Park	At-grade intersection; no southbound exit
Columbia	Taghkanic	79.72	128.30	C5	80	NY 82 – Ancram, Hudson, Rip Van Winkle Bridge	
Columbia	Taghkanic	80.50	129.55	C6		CR 10	At-grade intersection
Columbia	Taghkanic	81.60	131.32	C7		Post Hill Road	At-grade intersection
Columbia	Taghkanic	84.10	135.35	C8		Snydertown Road	At-grade intersection
Columbia	Claverack	84.60	136.15	C9		Manor Rock Road	At-grade intersection
Columbia	Claverack	86.50	139.21	C10		Bauer Road	At-grade intersection; dead end
Columbia	Claverack	87.30	140.50	C11		Palmer Road	At-grade intersection
Columbia	Claverack	87.77	141.25	C12	88	NY 23 – Claverack, Hillsdale	Access to Athens–Hudson Ferry and Rip Van Winkle Bridge
Columbia	Ghent	91.34	147.00	C13	91	NY 217 west / CR 21C east – Harlemville, Philmont, Hudson	Eastern terminus of NY 217; western terminus of CR 21C
Columbia	Ghent	92.00	148.06	Parking area (no facilities)			
Columbia	Ghent	93.70	150.80	C14		Harlemville Road	At-grade intersection
Columbia	Austerlitz	94.90	152.73	C15		Rigor Hill Road	At-grade intersection; gas station
Columbia	Austerlitz	99.25	159.73	C16	99	NY 203 – Austerlitz, Chatham, Valatie	
Columbia	Chatham	101.88	163.96	C17	102	NY 295 – Chatham, East Chatham, Canaan	Access via Birge Hill/Hartigan Roads; last northbound exit before toll
Columbia	Chatham	104.00	167.37			To NY 295 – East Chatham, Canaan	Southbound exit only; access via Upper Cady Road; all trucks must exit
Columbia	Chatham	104.10	167.53	Exit B2 Toll Gantry			
Columbia	Chatham	104.12	167.56			I-90 Toll (Berkshire Connector) – Albany, Boston	Exit B2 on I-90 / Thruway; northern terminus
1.000 mi = 1.609 km; 1.000 km = 0.621 mi: Closed/former; Electronic toll collection; Incomplete access

== See also ==
- National Register of Historic Places listings in Columbia County, New York
- National Register of Historic Places listings in Dutchess County, New York
- National Register of Historic Places listings in Putnam County, New York
- National Register of Historic Places listings in northern Westchester County, New York
- Parkways in New York

== Bibliography ==
- Caro, Robert (1974). The Power Broker: Robert Moses and the Fall of New York. New York: Knopf. ISBN 978-0-394-48076-3.
- LaFrank, Kathleen (November 2002). National Register of Historic Places nomination, Taconic State Parkway (Report). New York State Office of Parks, Recreation and Historic Preservation. PDF p. 89.
- Taconic State Parkway (PDF) (Report). National Register of Historic Places, National Park Service. 2005.
