= Millwood, New York =

- Hamlet & CDP
- Location within New York
- Coordinates: 41°11′32″N 73°47′50″W
- Country: United States
- State: New York
- County: Westchester
- Town: New Castle

Population (2000)
  - Total: 1,210
- Time zone: UTC-5 (Eastern (EST))
  - Summer (DST): UTC-4 (EDT)
- Area code: 914

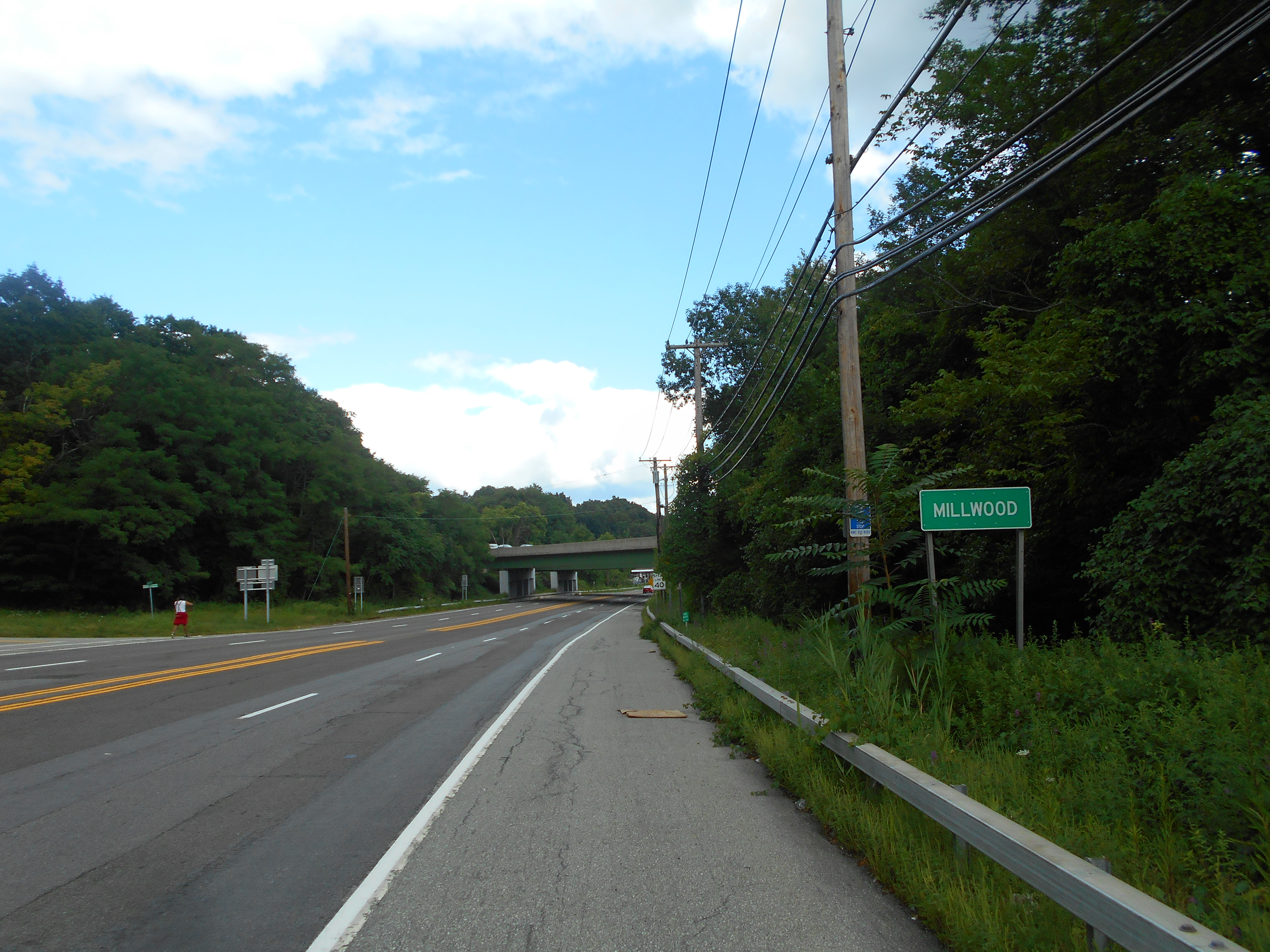
Entering Millwood from NY 100 northbound

Millwood is a hamlet and census-designated place located in the town of New Castle, New York, United States in Westchester County. It was originally settled as Sarlesville. The area now known as Millwood appears on 19th century maps as Merritt's Corners (now the intersection of NY 100 and NY 120) and Rockdale Mills (close to what is now the Briarcliff Manor border). As of the 2020 census, Millwood had a population of 1,081.

Miss America 1984, actress and singer Vanessa Williams grew up in Millwood, but lives in New Castle's larger hamlet of Chappaqua.

Sarles' Tavern, also known as Granite House, was added to the National Register of Historic Places in 1979.

== Education ==
All of the census-designated place is in the Chappaqua Central School District includes the village. Additionally, most of the Millwood area lies in the Chappaqua Central School district.

Schools include: Elementary - Roaring Brook, Westorchard and Douglas Grafflin; Middle School - Seven Bridges and Robert E. Bell; High School - Horace Greeley. Most Millwood public school students will go to Westorchard, Seven Bridges, and Horace Greeley. The last group of students who graduated from Bell were seniors during the 2007-2008 school year. Over 94% of Greeley graduates attend four-year colleges.

== Infrastructure ==
Millwood had a train station that was originally built by the New York and Putnam Railroad, that later became the Putnam Division of the New York Central Railroad. The last passenger train ran along the Putnam Division in May 1958. Freight service ended in 1962, when the rails were removed after this section had been abandoned. There was no usable track already by 1970. Pavement has since taken its place, and it is now a bicycle and pedestrian path, the North County Trailway. The original Millwood station house, built in 1888, burnt to the ground soon after the station was built, and it was replaced by a baggage car. The baggage car remained the station until 1910, when Henry Law built a new station for Briarcliff and the old Briarcliff Manor station was moved to Millwood. This station house was demolished in May 2012.

The closest Metro-North Railroad station is Chappaqua on the Harlem Line.

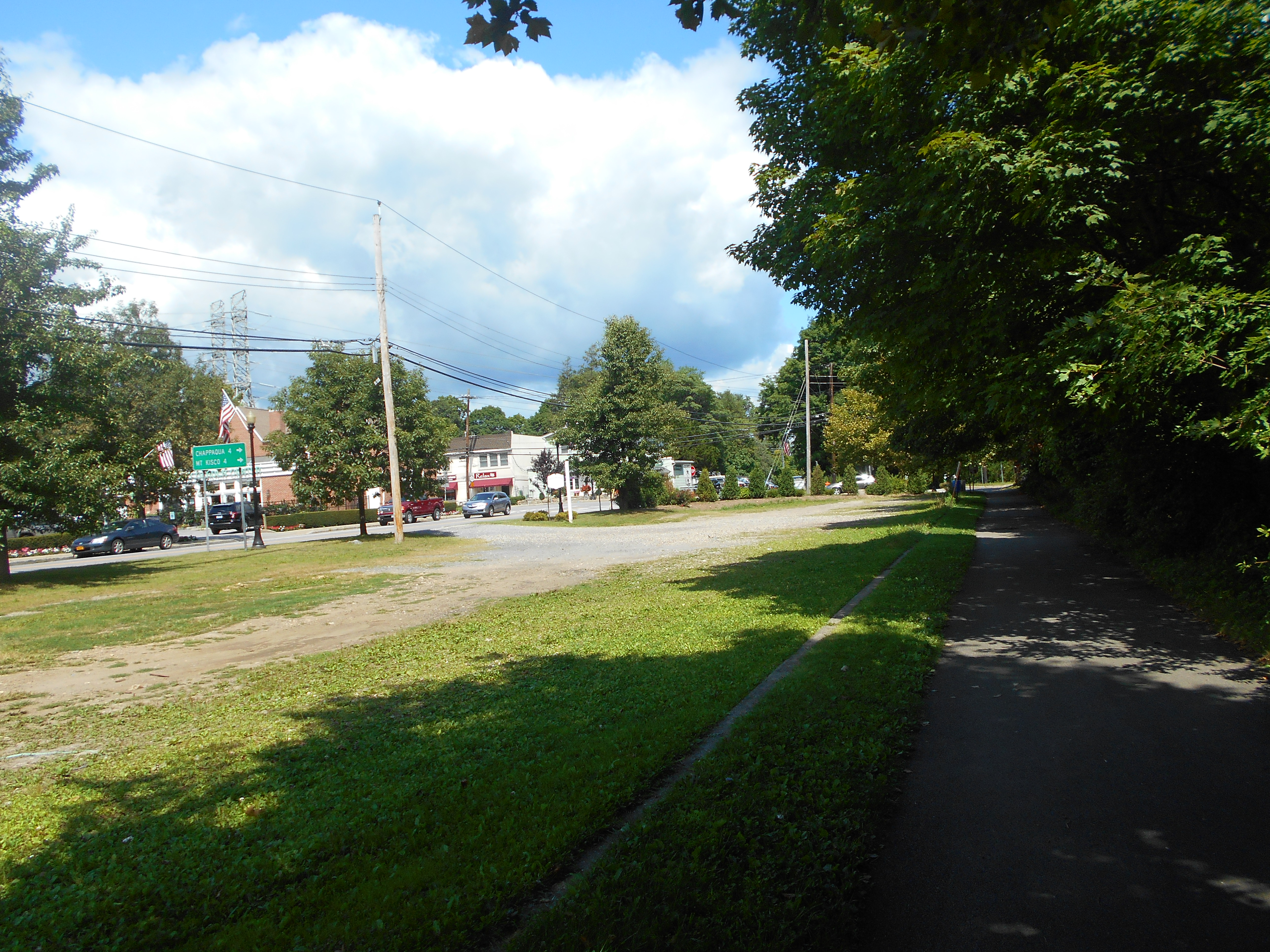
Site of the former Millwood station depot. The platform's outline is visible in the foreground while signage on NY 133 is visible in the background

Important highways: Taconic State Parkway (North to Albany, South to Hawthorne), NY Route 100 (North to Somers, South to Yonkers), NY Route 133 (East to Mount Kisco, West to Ossining), NY Route 120 (South to Rye, North end in Millwood).

=== Fire department ===
As legend has it, lightning struck the Millwood railroad station one spring day in 1924 and a blazing fire started. Area residents attempted to put out the fire, but they did not have the equipment or manpower and the Chappaqua fire department was called in to suppress the blaze. To many residents, the railroad fire incident underscored the importance of a quick response to a fire in Millwood. Shortly after the railroad fire, a dozen families met to start the Millwood Fire Company to meet the suppression needs of the community.

Land for the Millwood Fire House was located on Route 120. The founders of the Fire Company contributed seed money and solicited area residents for donations for the land, to build Station #1 and to buy the 1924 Brockway chemical pumper. Much of the labor to build the firehouse was donated by residents, as many were carpenters and tradesmen.

In the beginning, firefighters were called to alarms by hammering the bell – still to be seen – in front of Station #1. That system was soon replaced with an air horn which was later replaced with an electronic siren still in use today.

In the early days, reporting a fire was done by telephone. When a fire was reported, telephones would ring in ten locations including Station #1, Millwood Shell, Deems Mobil, and the private homes of the Fire Company officers. Each of these phones was capable of sounding the air horn at Station #1. Today, a caller can dial 911 to report a fire, and firefighters are dispatched by a portable radio paging/alert system and an audible alarm sounds at the firehouse. Pager freq are Westchester county fire control 46.26 for page out and Trunk 17 for response. They also utilize county fire 17 for operations and communications to 60 control and multi-district communication at major fires.

The Millwood Fire Company currently houses two locations: Station #1 located on Route 120 and Station #2 located on Route 134. There are approximately 50 volunteers that respond to over 300 alarms a year. The all volunteer company is equipped with six fire-fighting pieces of equipment: two Engines (E-247, E-248), a Tanker (T-15), a Ladder (L-52 - a quint), a Rescue-Engine (R-36), a Mini-Attack (MA-10), and two utility vehicles (U-44, U-145).
