= Saw Mill River =

River in Westchester County, New York

Saw Mill River Nepperhan Creek, Colendonck's Kill
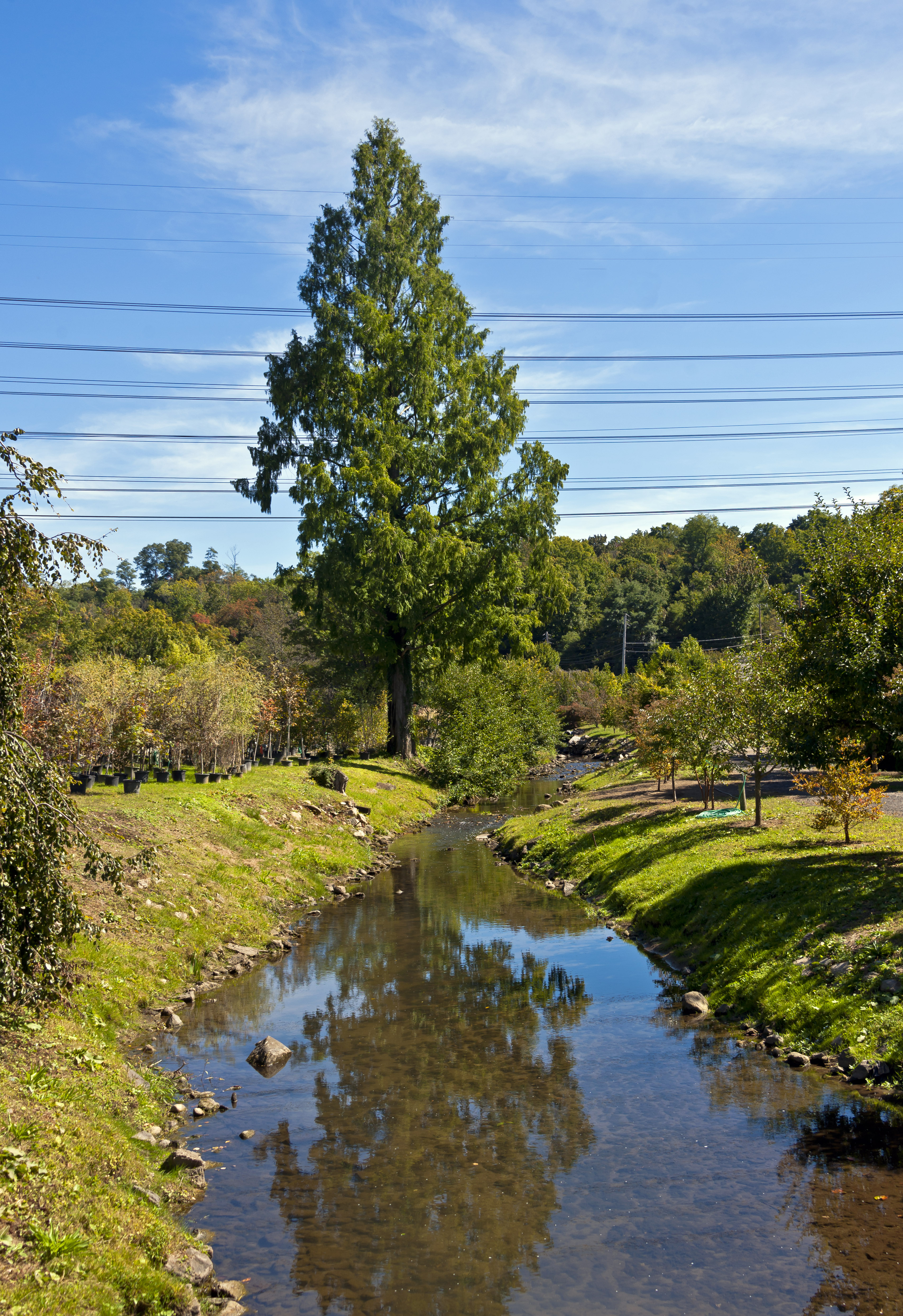
- Saw Mill River in Hawthorne

Location
- Country: United States
- State: New York
- Region: Hudson Valley
- County: Westchester
- Municipalities: New Castle, Mount Pleasant, Greenburgh, Yonkers

Physical characteristics
- Source
  - location: Unnamed pond in Chappaqua
  - coordinates: 41°10′40″N 73°46′49″W
  - elevation: 494 ft (151 m)
- Mouth: Hudson River
  - location: Yonkers
  - coordinates: 40°56′8″N 73°54′11″W
  - elevation: 0 ft (0 m)
- Length: 23.5 mi (37.8 km)
- Basin size: 26.5 mi^{2} (69 km^{2})
- Discharge
  - location: Yonkers
  - average: 32.3 cu ft/s (0.91 m^{3}/s)
  - minimum: 0.11 cu ft/s (0.0031 m^{3}/s)
  - maximum: 1,840 cu ft/s (52 m^{3}/s)

Basin features
- Tributaries
  - left: Tercia Brook, Nannyhagen Brook, Mine Brook, Rum Brook

The Saw Mill River is a 23.5-mile (37.8 km) tributary of the Hudson River in Westchester County, New York, United States. It flows from an unnamed pond north of Chappaqua to Getty Square in Yonkers, where it empties into the Hudson as that river's southernmost tributary. It is the only major stream in southern Westchester County to drain into the Hudson instead of Long Island Sound. It drains an area of 26.5 square miles (69 km^{2}), most of it heavily developed suburbia. For 16 miles (26 km), it flows parallel to the Saw Mill River Parkway, a commuter artery, an association that has been said to give the river an "identity crisis."

The watershed was settled by the Dutch in the 17th century. The land was long owned by Frederick Philipse I and his descendants as Philipsburg Manor, site of Philipse Manor Hall, until the family lost it at the end of the American Revolution. The land along the river was later divided into multiple towns. Industry in Yonkers developed along the Saw Mill, so polluting the river by the end of the 19th century that a local poet called it a "snake-like yellow scrawl of scum". In the 1920s, the last half-mile (800 m) of the stream was routed into culverts under downtown Yonkers, a process partially reversed in the early 21st century when it became the first major New York waterway to be daylighted.

Today, the U.S. Environmental Protection Agency (EPA) rates the river's last 2.9 miles (4.7 km) as an impaired water body. Plastics are commonly found along the riverbank, and metals from industrial factories are found in the water in high concentrations. Nonetheless, the river is home to species such as the American eel (Anguilla rostrata), which swim upstream to mature and swim back into the Hudson and the ocean in order to breed.

== Course ==
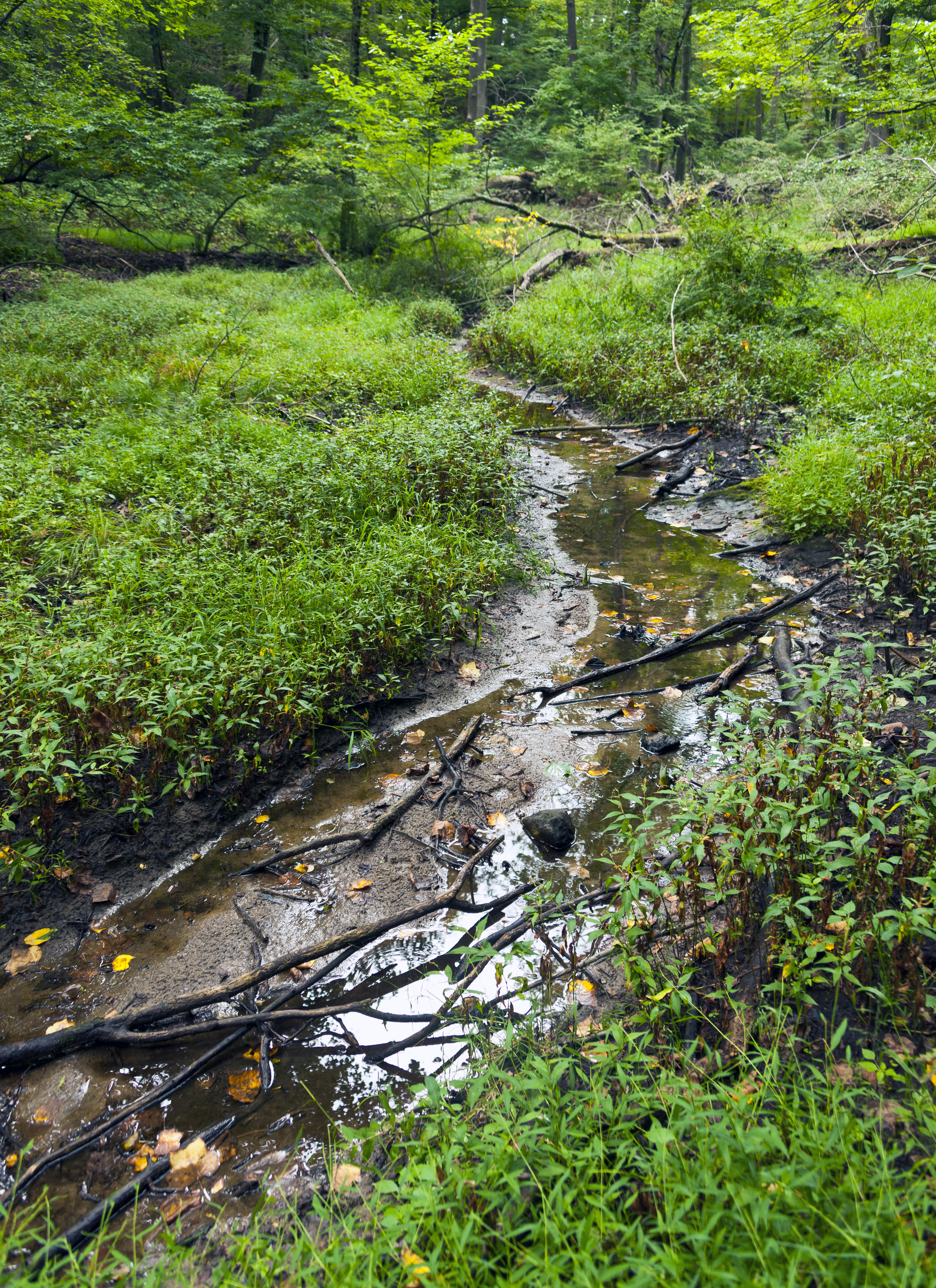
Headwaters of the Saw Mill River in the woods of Chappaqua, just below its source

The Saw Mill River rises from a 1.75-acre (7,100 m^{2}) pond in a wooded area of the town of New Castle roughly 2 miles (3.2 km) north of Chappaqua, a one-half mile (800 m) west of Quaker Road (State Route 120/NY 120) and just south of Stony Hollow Road, at an elevation of 490 feet (150 m) above sea level. It wends in a generally southward direction past a cemetery, between hills, and through an area of houses on large wooded lots. Just north of Marcourt Drive, its first crossing, it is impounded to create another small pond. In this area it is frequently channelized and impounded as part of residential landscaping. After crossing under Kipp Street, it bends eastward beneath Quaker Road.

A short channelized portion runs through the front yard of a large house on Quaker southeast of the intersection, after which the river flows back under Quaker and behind the houses on the west side into another impoundment, Chappaqua's Duck Pond. From its outlet it continues southeast between Quaker on its east and Douglas and Mill River roads on the west to the Saw Mill River Parkway. Just west of the Chappaqua train station, it turns southwest to parallel both the parkway and Metro-North Railroad's Harlem Line as both cross into the town of Mount Pleasant. At this point the river is at 340 feet (100 m) in elevation, a loss of 150 feet (46 m) from its source. Just south of the town line, it receives Tertia Brook, its first named tributary, from the east.

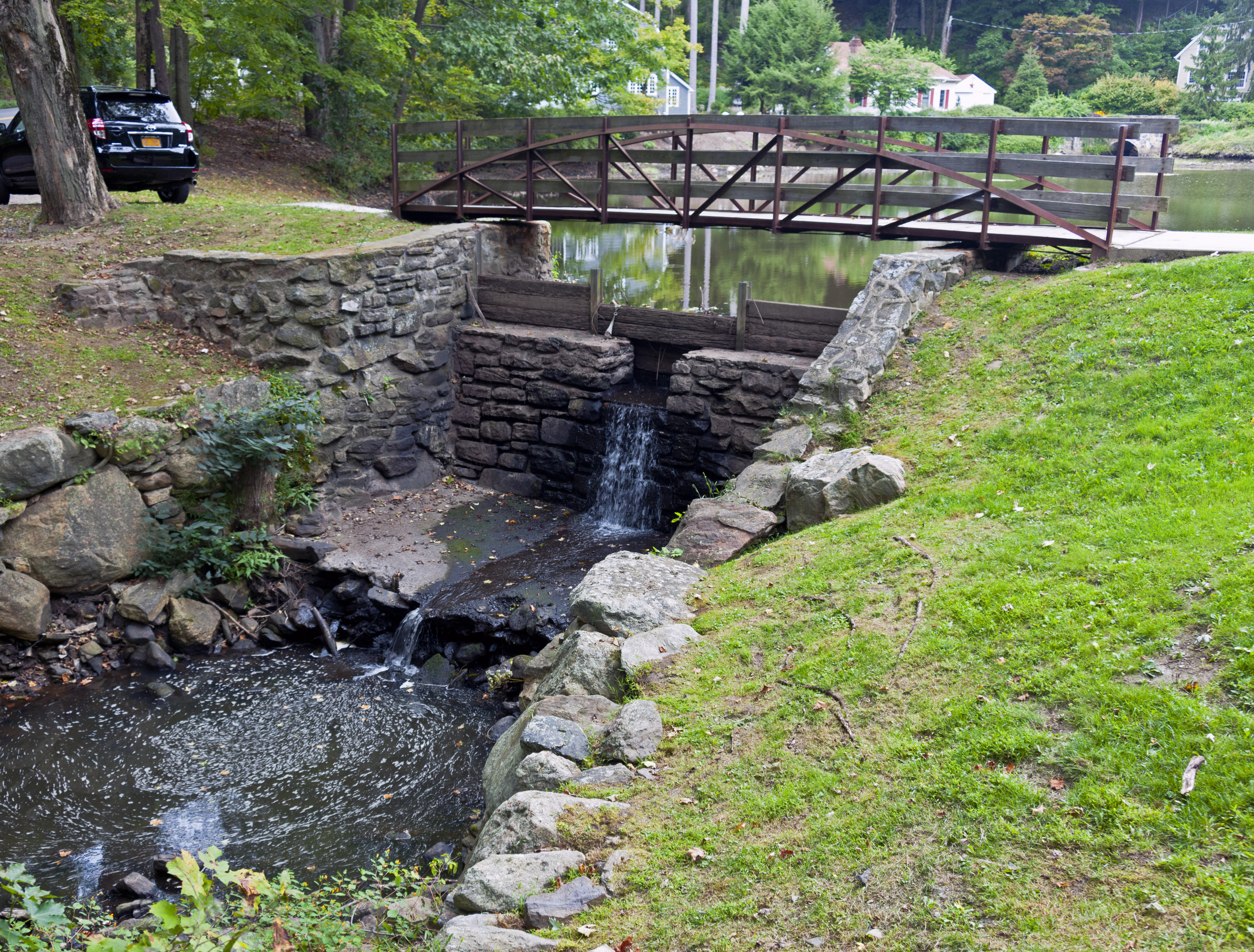
Saw Mill River flowing out of the Chappaqua Duck Pond

A mile past the town line, the river and parkway pass the village of Pleasantville to the east. There the river crosses under the parkway to flow on its west, then crosses and recrosses at the Pleasantville Road (State Route 117) exit. Both make a long turn to the southeast and then back to the southwest around Graham Hills County Park, where it receives Nanny Hagen Brook from the east, before crossing back to the parkway's west in the flood plain around the base of the hills as road, river and rail pass the unincorporated hamlets of Thornwood, and Hawthorne, where the Harlem Line turns to the south.

Just east of the Taconic State Parkway, the river again crosses under the Saw Mill Parkway, then the Taconic. Shortly after that exit it crosses under Saw Mill River Road (State Routes 9A and 100) and some ramps to them from the interchange, then under the Saw Mill Parkway. Both turn south again, then southeast, following the eastern edge of the Pocantico Hills, joined on the west by the North County Trailway bike path, on the right-of-way of the former New York and Putnam Railroad, known as the "Old Put".

The river crosses under the parkway again to form the eastern edge of a plant nursery on Saw Mill River Road, then recrosses as the river, bike path, parkway and Saw Mill River Road all bend around the northwest corner of Eastview, where the Saw Mill drops below 200 feet (61 m) in elevation, a loss of 100 feet (30 m) since Chappaqua. A turn back to the southwest around Tarrytown Lakes County Park puts the river at the outskirts of Elmsford. There it receives Mine Brook from the east.

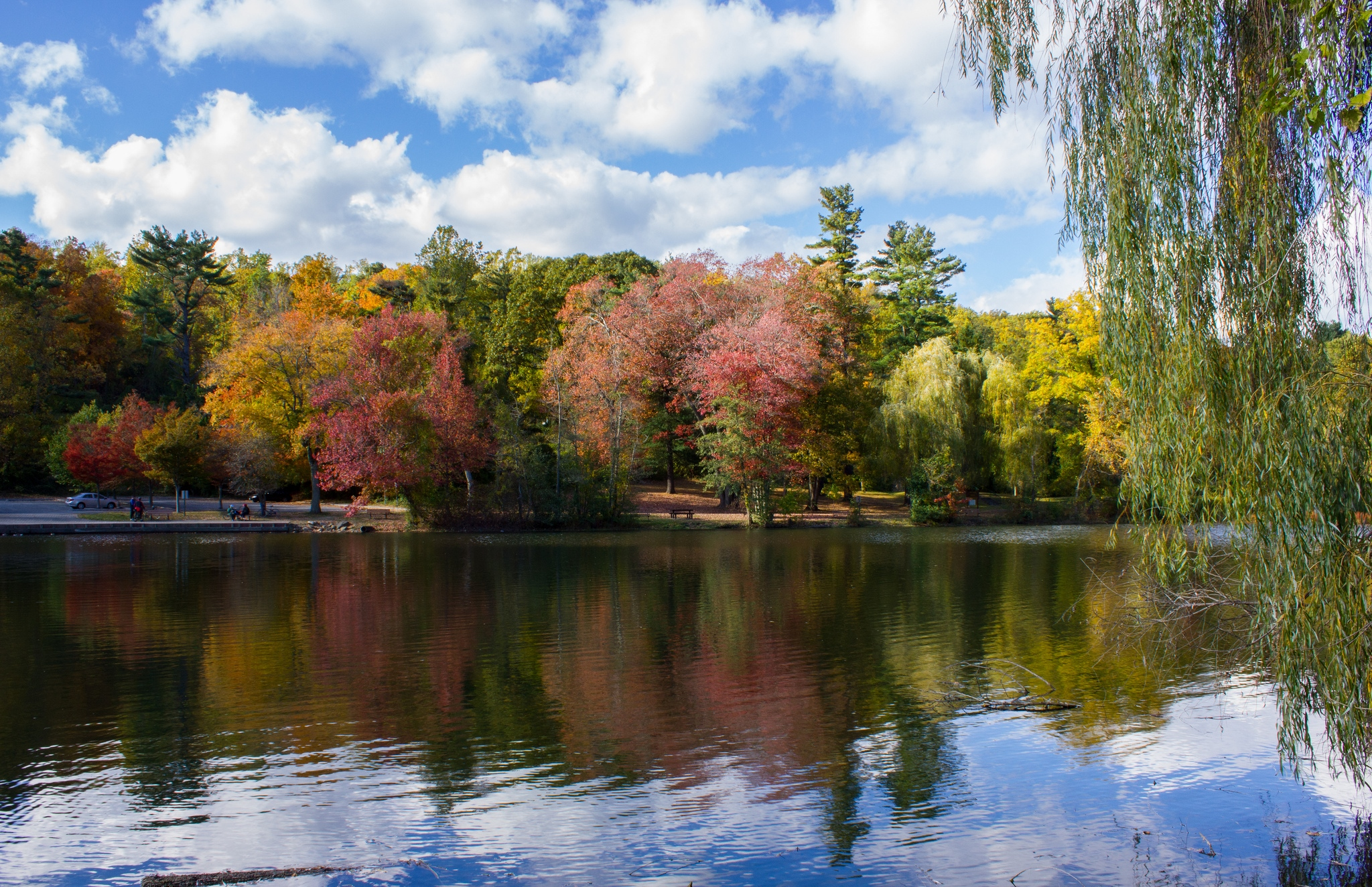
Woodlands Lake in Greenburgh

Here the bike path ends amidst the dense urban development, but the parkway continues, and the two again draw close as they enter the town of Greenburgh and intersect the Cross Westchester Expressway (Interstate 287). A new bike path, the South County Trailway, begins here just south of the West Main Street (State Route 119) bridge north of the Rum Brook confluence. Past that the parkway, trailway and the Saw Mill River all turn southwest, where they intersect the New York State Thruway (Interstate 87) at an oblique angle. For the next mile the Thruway remains close to the river, and Saw Mill River Road, now just carrying NY 9A, returns to the corridor just east of the Thruway as well.

The river then runs along the west of V. Everit Macy Park. As part of the park facilities, the Saw Mill River is impounded into Woodlands Lake, the largest impoundment on the Saw Mill River, used as a water supply by the local communities of Ardsley and Dobbs Ferry, whose northern village line is just to the south. The river runs close to the boundary between the two, as the Thruway gradually veers away to the southeast just past the Ashford Avenue bridge.

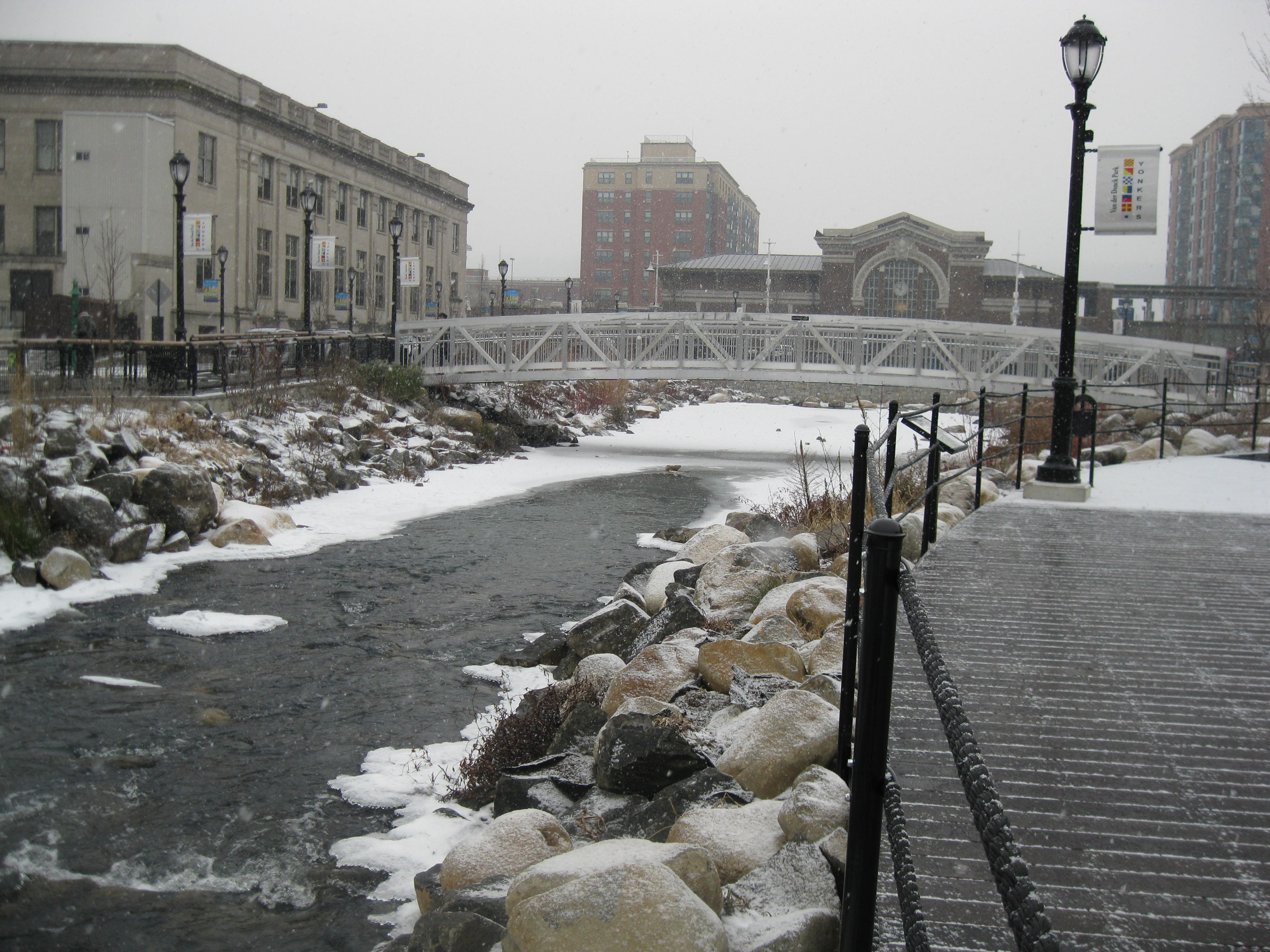
Newly daylighted Saw Mill River in Van Der Donck Park, Yonkers

Continuing south-southwest, the river along with the parkway and trailway enter Hastings-on-Hudson, its greenbelt the only major break in the village's dense suburban development. It slowly veers toward a more southerly heading, and enters the Nepera Park neighborhood of Yonkers after 1 mile (1.6 km), just south of Farragut Parkway. Once in the neighborhood, the Saw Mill River flows through a former Yonkers water treatment plant, the other impoundment of the river. After leaving the plant, 1.5 miles (2.4 km) to the south of where the river entered Yonkers, the parkway and trailway diverge from the river after 16 miles (26 km), to climb over the watershed divide to Tibbetts Brook. Saw Mill River Road continues to parallel its namesake.

Bending to the southwest again, the Saw Mill flows in a narrow channel through an industrial and commercial area. A mile south of the parkway, it flows through the middle of the former Smith Carpet Mills site, where it finally drops to 100 feet (30 m) in elevation. After crossing Ashburton Avenue, the river bends around to flow briefly to the northwest under Nepperhan Avenue after crossing the Old Croton Aqueduct. It circles around War Memorial Field, giving up its remaining elevation as the Hudson River nears.

As every one may not recognize these boundaries by their original Indian names, it may be well to observe, that the Neperan is that beautiful stream, vulgarly called the Saw-Mill River, which, after winding gracefully for many miles through a lovely valley, shrouded by groves, and dotted by Dutch farm-houses, empties itself into the Hudson, at the ancient drop of Yonkers.

— Washington Irving, Wolfert's Roost, Chronicle II

The Saw Mill River turns south again past the park. After passing the towers of a large housing project to its west, it is routed into a tunnel at Chicken Island, the triangle between Nepperhan and Palisade avenues and School Street. At Van der Donck Park in downtown Yonkers, it resurfaces as it flows past the post office. For its final hundred feet (30 m), it re-enters a tunnel under the train station and the tracks of the Hudson Line, after which culverts empty it into the Hudson south of Dock Street.

== Watershed ==
The Saw Mill's 26.5-square-mile (69 km^{2}) watershed is limited by the hilly topography of central Westchester County to a valley that averages 1.4 miles (2.3 km) wide; the only wider spots are the Mine Brook and Tarrytown Lakes subwatersheds and the river's mouth in downtown Yonkers. The highest elevation in the watershed is 710 feet (220 m), reached in two locations: the summit of Sarles Hill north of Pleasantville, and an unnamed height of land about 1,200 feet (370 m) southwest of Buttermilk Hill, west of Hawthorne.

From source to mouth, 10% of the watershed is in New Castle, 42% in the town of Mount Pleasant, 33% in Greenburgh, and 14% in Yonkers. 63% of the watershed consists of dense urban or less dense suburban land development, 34% forest, and 1% agricultural. The woodlands buffering the river and the South County Trailway is one of the few significant areas of open space in the county south of I-287.

Some 110,000 people live in the Saw Mill River's watershed, in communities varying from small villages to Yonkers, New York's fourth-largest city. This is 12% of the county's total, on 6% of its area. The watershed's population density varies from 1,000 per square mile around the headwaters at Chappaqua to 10,000 around the mouth. It averages to 4,151 per square mile, twice that of the county and ten times the density for the state.

On the north, the Saw Mill watershed is bordered by the watersheds of Gedney Brook and the Kisco River, both of which drain into New Croton Reservoir on the Croton River, one of several large reservoirs in that watershed that are part of New York City's water supply system. On the northeast, the adjacent watersheds drain into Kensico Reservoir, another that supplies the city. Moving south, the next watersheds are tributaries of the Bronx River, then Yonkers' Grassy Sprain Reservoir and finally Tibbetts Brook. To its west in the narrow strip between the Saw Mill and the Hudson are the Pocantico River and Sheldon Brook watersheds at the north end of the watershed, and those of unnamed shorter streams at the south.

== History ==
=== Pre-colonial ===
The Saw Mill River, then known as the Nepperhan River, acted as a boundary between the Manhattan Indians and the Weckquaesgeeks, members of the Algonquian family who fished the region's streams and lakes with rods and nets. The Manhattans occupied present-day New York City north to the river, while the Weckquaesgeeks occupied the land from the river north to the Pocantico River. The Manhattans' principal village, Nepperamack, was on the site of present-day Yonkers where the Saw Mill River discharges into the Hudson River. The Weckquaesgeeks settled the site of today's Dobbs Ferry, and on the river's banks west of White Plains.

=== Colonial period ===
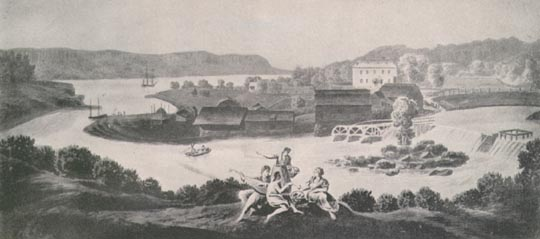
The Saw Mill River flowing past Philipse Manor Hall into the Hudson River, c. 1784

In 1639, the Dutch West India Company acquired from the Manhattans the area that would become Yonkers. Seven years later, Dutch settler Adriaen van der Donck was granted part of this land, including the southern section of what he named the Saeck-kill, today's Saw Mill River. His estate was called Colen Donck, for "Donck's colony". He built a sawmill and a gristmill on the Saeck-kill. After his death, his widow gradually sold the land.

In the 1670s, part of Donck's land passed to Frederick Philipse, who was rewarded with 90,000 acres (360 km^{2}), including the lower river, for declaring his loyalty to the new English rulers of New Netherlands. Philipse named the manor Philipsborough (later, the common spelling would change to "Philipsburg") and ran it as a quasi-feudal farm, hiring tenants to work the land. Around 1682, he built Philipse Manor Hall, a mansion along the Saw Mill River that is today a National Historic Landmark. When Philipse died around 1702, the manor was divided between his son Adolph and grandson Frederick II. In 1750, his great-grandson Frederick III inherited the whole property and moved from his New York City townhouse to the manor hall, previously used as the family's summer home. Frederick sat in the Colonial Assembly, where he was a strong supporter of the English government, which had given his family everything it owned, but he was primarily interested in managing the land. He improved the manor hall and worked to attract tenant farmers to the land. The family was known for its relaxed approach to its tenants, and the farm was very profitable.

Commercially navigable only at its mouth, the Saw Mill River itself was useless as a way to bring crops to market, limiting settlement further upriver. Nevertheless, the roots of present-day communities along the river were established during the colonial era. In 1695, a land agent named Isaac See settled at the north bound of Philipse Manor, in the flat land between a bend in the river. Other farmers came to the area, and the settlement ultimately became today's village of Pleasantville.

Houses from colonial settlement era

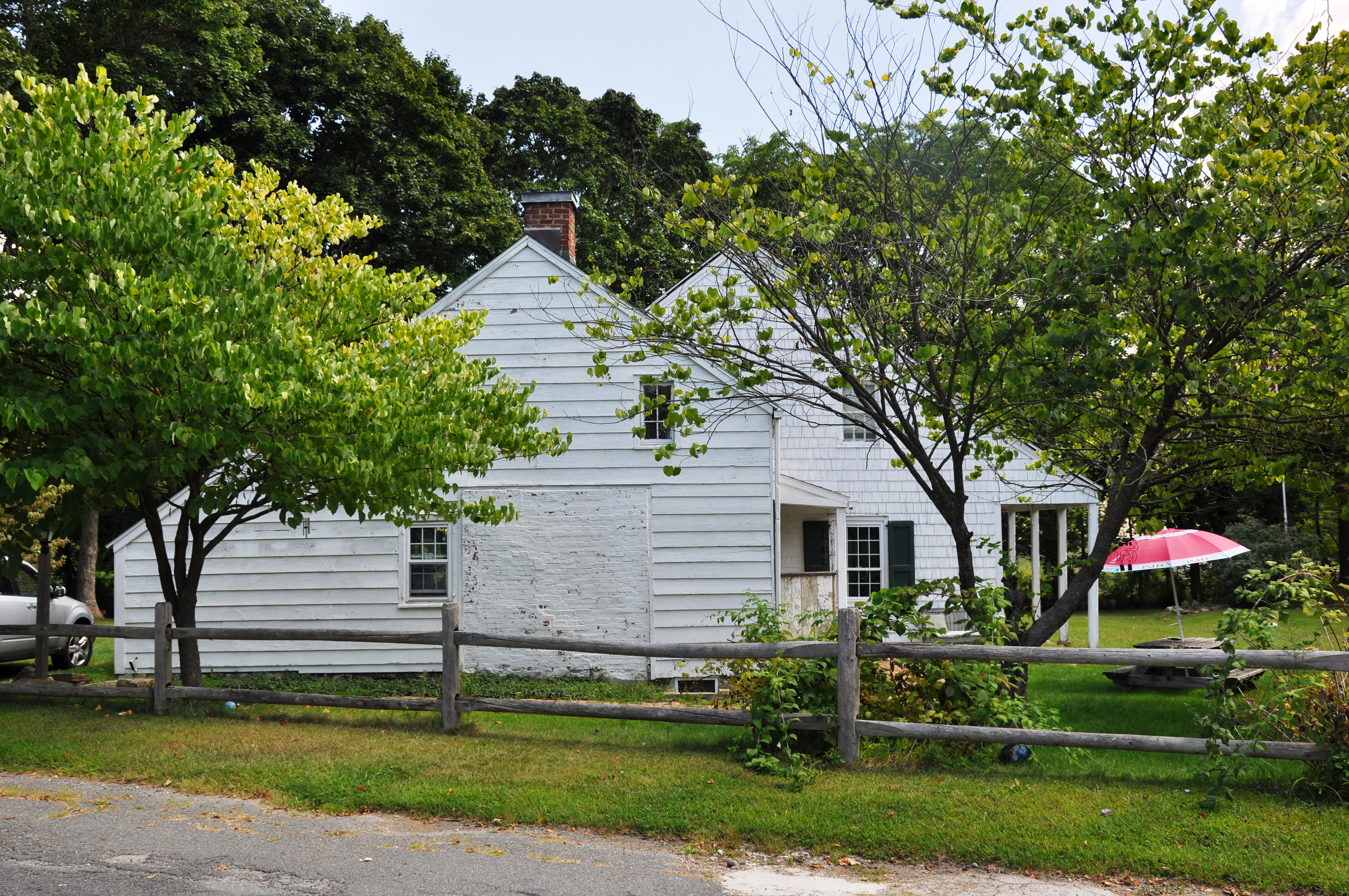
1719 Hammond House, Eastview

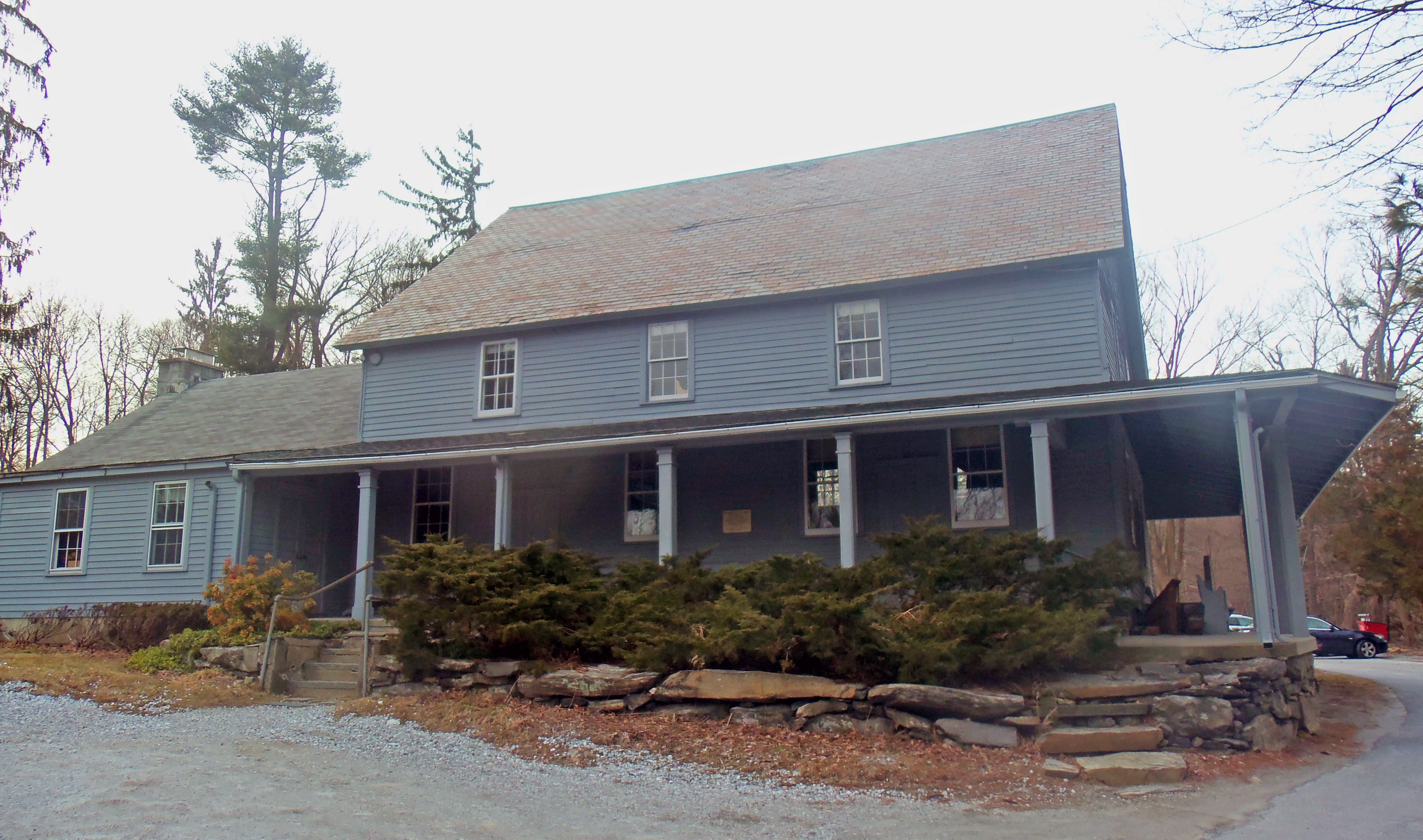
1755 Quaker meeting house at Chappaqua

By 1704, the area that is today Elmsford, New York was known as Storm's Bridge, after Abraham Storm, who established a tavern at the junction of the Saw Mill River and Tarrytown roads (today routes 9A and 119) that is the center of that village today. In 1719, one of the Philipse tenant farmers, William Hammond, built his house on land he leased in what is today Eastview, where his house still stands. Along the river to the north, his brother Staats Hammond built two mills along the river; the small settlement of Hammond's Mill became today's Hawthorne.

Other settlers came to the Saw Mill River's headwaters from a different direction. Quakers had been immigrating to Long Island since the previous century to escape religious persecution in England; in the 1700s, "Shapequaw", north of the present hamlet of Chappaqua, was established. In the middle of the century, the community built its meeting house; it and other buildings of the era are today part of the Old Chappaqua Historic District, listed on the National Register of Historic Places in 1974.

==== Revolutionary War ====
As tensions rose between the colonists and Britain in the early 1770s, Philipse remained loyal to the Crown. He was arrested in August 1776 and held in Connecticut until a parole grant at the end of the year allowed him to return home as long as he did nothing to support the British. He broke that promise the next spring: he attempted, perhaps at the behest of his wife, to inform the British that a passing column of Continental Army troops was headed south to attack a British camp at Morrisania, now in the Bronx. Shortly afterwards he fled to British-occupied New York; he would never return to his home along the Saw Mill.

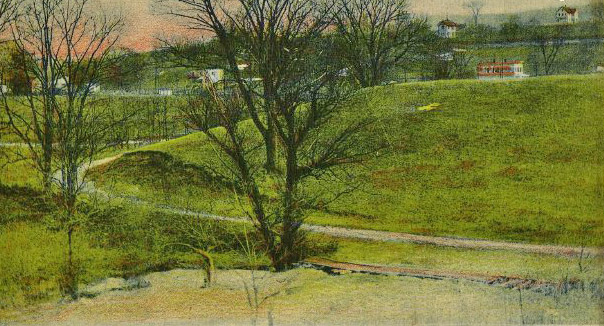
Postcard of Yankee Dam in Hawthorne, since obliterated by modern highway construction

Communities along the Saw Mill played minor parts in the Revolutionary War, especially after the Battle of White Plains in October 1776. The defeated Continentals retreated to the vicinity of Peekskill while the victorious British withdrew to Kingsbridge in what is now the Bronx. Neither side wanted to cede control of the Hudson Valley, which divided New England from the other colonies. This left most of Westchester the so-called "Neutral Ground." However, Westchester was not demilitarized. Local militias and raiding parties affiliated with both sides fought each other and terrorized the other's sympathizers and supporters. Many residents of southern Westchester abandoned their farms and drove their herds up the valley to Buttermilk Hill to protect them from Loyalist raids. The Continentals built forts near Hawthorne, where a minor tributary named Flykill Creek drained into the Saw Mill (roughly at the junction of today's Saw Mill and Taconic parkways), and built Yankee Dam to create a lake wide enough to slow any British progress up the river. At Chappaqua, the pacifist Quakers opened their meetinghouse as a hospital for injured Continental Army soldiers. Storm's tavern was a gathering place for Continental officers and, later, their French colleagues.

As one of the few routes into hilly central Westchester, the river and its associated roads saw frequent skirmishes. In November 1777, three young men with Patriot sympathies were walking near the river crossing on the Dobbs Ferry Road (now Ashford Avenue) when they came upon a group of horsemen affiliated with Kipp's Regiment, one of the county's most-feared Loyalist military units. The young men taunted their rivals, who beat them so severely that two later died. The survivor was awarded a pension, believed to be the first in U.S. history, by the Continental Congress.

Later that month, Emmerick's Chasseurs, an elite unit of Loyalist militia and Hessian soldiers, staged a midnight raid on Storm's Bridge. Hoping to capture Storm and his cousins the Van Tassels, all active in the local Patriot militia, the Chasseurs settled for burning and looting Storm's house and tavern. Proceeding on to the Van Tassel houses, they trapped Cornelius Van Tassel Jr., one of the cousins' teenage sons. As the Chasseurs set fire to the houses, he hid on a roof, then jumped off, fended off some putative captors, and fled into the cold waters of the nearby Saw Mill. He got away, but soon died of hypothermia.

The Saw Mill River and its adjacent terrain conferred some tactical advantages to those who knew it. One skirmish began when a Patriot militiaman, Jacob Acker, was hunting in a bushy area of the eastern flood plain at Elmsford. He spotted a detachment of 28 British soldiers, accompanied by a group of Loyalists, marching on the road to Storm's tavern. Acker began sniping at them from his concealment and killed two soldiers. Hearing the shots, other local Patriots came to Acker's aid, and eventually all but one of the detachment and the Loyalists accompanying them were captured.

Some senior Continental Army officers spent time in the Saw Mill River valley. George Washington is said to have mentioned the "ford over the Nepperhan at the elm tree", referring to a wide tree no longer extant; a century later, residents named their hamlet after the remark, "Elmsford". He left a meeting at the Hammond House in Eastview moments before Loyalists converged on it; his host, Col. James Hammond, the commander of the Westchester militia, was captured and imprisoned for the rest of the war. On the British side, Major John André spent his last night before his capture, with documents detailing Benedict Arnold's defection, at the Rookery inn in Hawthorne.

Later in the war, Young's farmhouse and Four Corners were the site of the largest military engagement near the river. By 1780, the Continentals were operating much more freely around northern Westchester, although they had to stay on the move to avoid attack. In January, one company of about 250 troops from Massachusetts lingered long enough at Four Corners for local Loyalists to inform the British, who raised a force of about 100 cavalry and 400 to 500 infantry at Fort Washington, today on the northern tip of Manhattan. The force marched to Yonkers and up the Saw Mill overnight, arriving at Four Corners the next morning. The outnumbered Continentals put up stiff resistance, aided by the cold, heavy snow cover and their opponents' fatigue, but most were ultimately killed or taken prisoner. The British force, which also consisted of Loyalist and Hessian troops, subsequently burned down the Young house; the Continentals retreated to the north of the Croton River for the rest of the war.

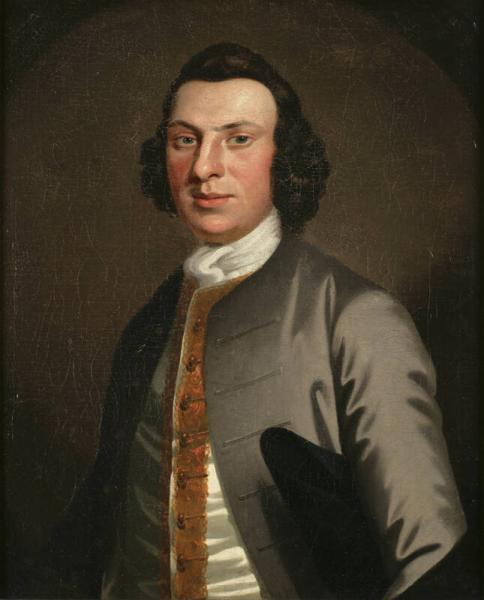
Frederick Philipse III, last lord of Philipsburg Manor

In 1779, the New York State Legislature passed a bill of attainder confiscating the property of British officials and prominent Loyalists, Philipse included. The land, including land in the Saw Mill River watershed, was then distributed to the tenant farmers. In 1788, the state divided into three the town of Greenburgh, in which the entire eastern half of the tract had been located. The towns of Yonkers and Mount Pleasant joined Greenburgh, all approximately within their present boundaries. In 1790, a group of settlers organized the Greenburgh Presbyterian Church, and three years later built a church at Storm's Bridge. (Today, it is the National Register-listed Elmsford Reformed Church, the oldest building in the village, the oldest church in continuous use in Westchester County.)

=== 19th and 20th centuries ===
Most of Yonkers' economy in the early 19th century was derived from the Saw Mill River. As of 1813, there was a small wharf slightly upstream from the mouth where the sloops that carried river trade put in. Five small mills existed along the river above the village, all with their own dams, small mill ponds, and nearby tenements for the workers. The stagecoach route up the Post Road stopped at an inn near the bridge; a few stores existed to supply the workers there and at the mills. Some pastures and orchards existed, but the rocky soil deterred most attempts at farming. (A historian later wrote that it was said at the time that "the succession of boulders was so continuous that one might have stepped from Getty Square to the present Glenwood without setting his foot upon the ground".) Between the rocky soil and Wells' general refusal to sell or lease most of his land, there were so few settlers in Yonkers that two schoolhouses built during the Revolution fell into severe neglect due to the lack of students.

The manor house and the surrounding land at the river's mouth that is today downtown passed through several owners until 1813, when New York merchant Lemuel Wells bought the 320 acres (130 ha) around the manor house. Wells neither subdivided nor developed the property, although he did extensively landscape the manor house grounds. In 1831, Wells built a long wharf into the Hudson just above the mouth of the Saw Mill for the steamboat service which had been established between New York and Albany. Otherwise, the property remained largely unchanged until his death in 1842.

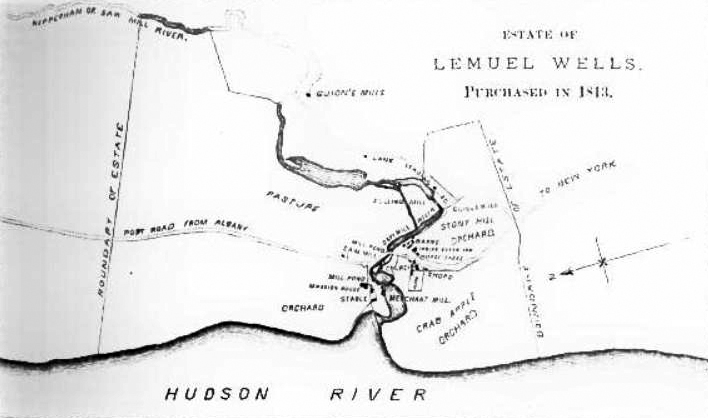
Map of Yonkers in 1813, at the time of Wells' purchase of the area

Maps of the property from the time of Wells' purchase and his death show the Saw Mill's mouth widening into a small estuary before reaching the Hudson. The south bank of the river at the mouth had a 40-foot-high (12 m) bluff. The only construction directly affecting the river was the bridge that carried the Albany Post Road, today Riverdale and Warburton avenues, part of U.S. Route 9 and Route 9A, over the river.

Wells had survived the death of his first wife and all four of his brothers; he also had no children, leaving him without a clear heir. His estate was further complicated by his lack of a will. Accordingly, under New York law at the time, his holdings were divided among his widow, fifteen nephews and one grand nephew. They decided to subdivide and sell the property, and within a few years more buildings had gone up, just in time for the construction of the Hudson River Railroad in 1848, which laid its track on a causeway right across the river's mouth. Over the next several decades, as Yonkers' population grew rapidly, leading it to incorporate as a village and then, in 1872, a city, the rest of the estuary was filled in and narrowed and the bluffs on its south side graded out of existence.

By the later decades of the 19th century, industry had grown up along the river's lower portion. So much pollution was dumped into the river from the factories alongside it that a local poet lamented the Saw Mill's decline in an 1891 quatrain:

'Tis now, at Yonkers's spreading feet,
A flow with odorous sins replete;
Its nitid bosom has become
A snake-like yellow scrawl of scum.

To let the river replenish itself, most of the dams that had been built were removed in 1893. Ten years later it had somewhat recovered, and people were again using it for drinking water and swimming.

In the late 19th century, the New York and Putnam Railroad was built along the Saw Mill River from Putnam County to central Yonkers, and thence to Tibbets Creek and the Harlem River. Various parts of the line operated until the 1940s and the 1980s. The main line of the railroad is now devoted to bicycle and pedestrian paths. They are the South County Trailway on the parts south of Route 119, and the North County Trailway north of 119 in Elmsford.

To slake the thirst of its ever-growing population, which had reached almost 100,000 by 1915, Yonkers tapped the Saw Mill. Water from an impoundment 2 miles (3.2 km) north of downtown was held in two reservoirs and two water towers. It was purified by slow filtration through sand and then chlorinated. By 1919 the city was drawing an average of 10.6 million gallons (40,000 m^{3}) a day from the river through this system.

Despite this, the pollution of the river continued unabated, reversing its earlier recovery. In a 1920 report on the condition of public water supplies around the state, New York's Health Department said "sanitary conditions upon the Saw Mill watershed are very unsatisfactory", despite the considerable rules and regulations it had promulgated to protect the river in Yonkers. The city's own public works department had noted dozens of violations for the previous year, most of them continued from the years before that. "A great many privies and cesspools are located on the edge of the Saw Mill and its tributaries and there is also drainage from poultry yards, barnyards and house drains," the department noted

Rather than enforce the violated regulations more strictly and clean up the river, the city chose to cover it up entirely. Between 1917 and 1922, the last 2,000 feet (610 m) of river, including a small gorge, was buried in a culvert under the Getty Square neighborhood, an effort to halt the river's frequent floods and quarantine its unsanitary water, and open up some space for further development. That same decade, the county parks commission proposed the Saw Mill River Parkway along the river, just as the 1922 Bronx River Parkway follows the Bronx River, and to add a sewer line along the river to prevent contamination of Yonkers' water supply. Construction began in 1929 and continued throughout the Great Depression. By 1940, the parkway had reached the river's headwaters at Chappaqua, where World War II temporarily halted construction. In 1954, it was complete. The parkway's construction, along with that of the New York State Thruway later in the decade, required some adjustment of the river's course in some areas.

Westchester's postwar development led to more stormwater runoff, which often flooded and closed the parkway. By 1958, engineers were urging that the river be cleaned up to reduce flooding. Still, illegal dumping and overflows continued. For example, storm runoff gave the Yonkers section the river's highest concentrations of heavy metals, PCBs, and other chemicals, according to a study of the river in 1983, the year the city stopped using the Saw Mill as its primary water source. A decade later, the sediment in the Saw Mill had the highest concentration of metals in the United States Geological Survey's entire water-quality assessment program.

=== 21st century ===
A new kind of pollution entered the lower Saw Mill in 2003 when a Yonkers sugar refinery spilled hydrochloric acid into the river. Westchester District Attorney Jeanine Pirro brought criminal environmental charges against American Sugar Refining, the plant owner, which was forced to pay a $20,000 fine; make a $100,000 donation to Riverkeeper, a regional environmental organization that focuses on the Hudson and its tributaries; and give 1 short ton (910 kg) of sugar to Westchester Food-PATCH, a local nonprofit that supplies food to other nonprofits. Riverkeeper passed the money it received along to the Saw Mill River Coalition for local projects in Yonkers.

In 2008, Groundwork Hudson Valley, the coordinator of the Saw Mill River Coalition, received a three-year, $889,183 U.S. Environmental Protection Agency Targeted Watershed Grant. One of 15 recipients from a nationwide pool of more than 100 applicants, the group cleans up garbage, removes invasive species, and plants native trees along the river. The group also marks storm drains that drain to the river. On September 25–26, 2009, the Saw Mill River Coalition organized a BioBlitz to catalog species of plant life, animal life, insects, fungi, and bacteria in the river and its watershed. The Coalition is also looking to restore the wetlands along the river in order to reduce flooding.

Raising of the Saw Mill Parkway continues; in 2013, a 900-foot (270 m) stretch in Pleasantville was raised by three inches to reduce flooding from the river.

==== Daylighting ====
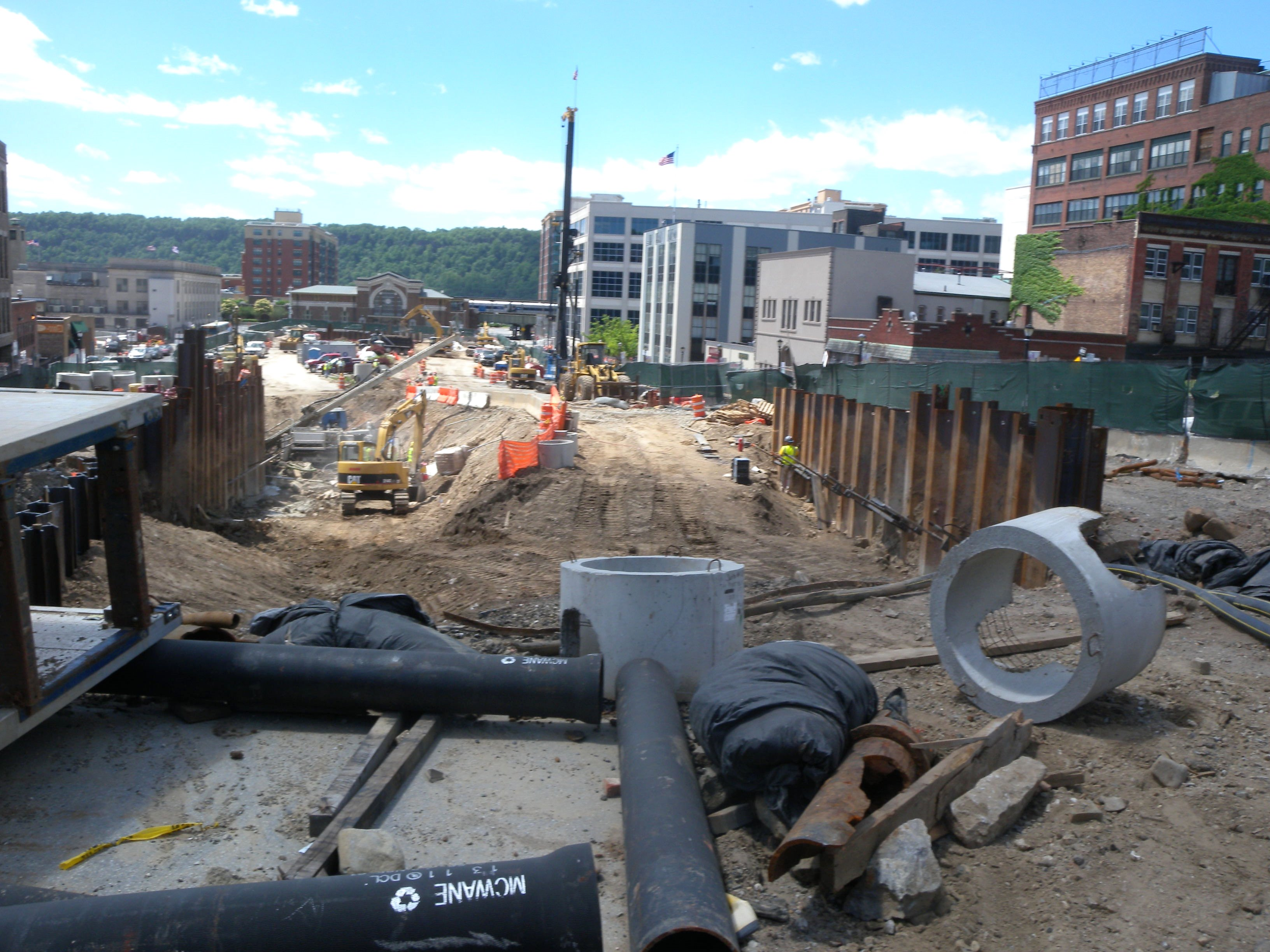
2011 daylighting construction

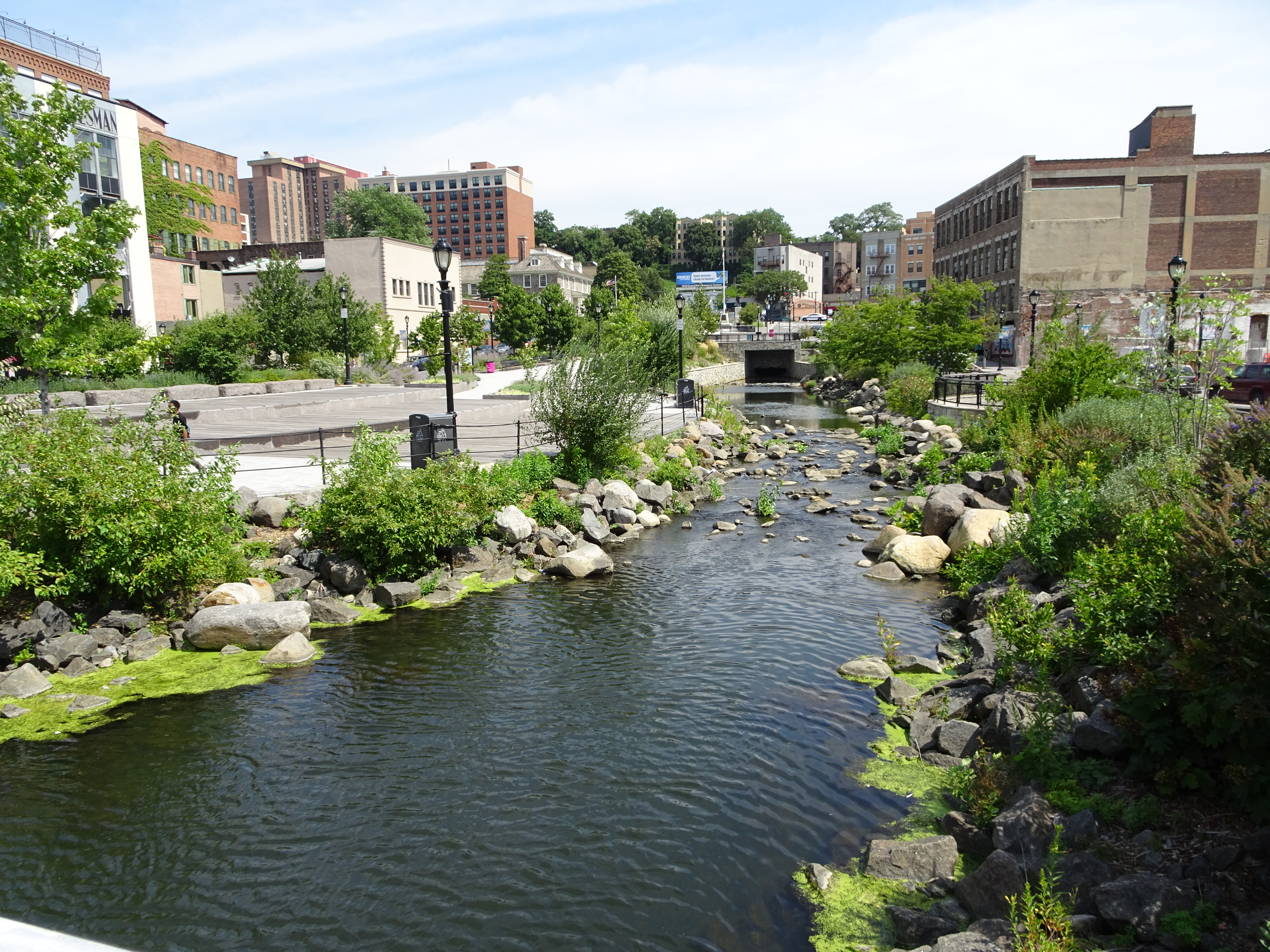
Daylighted

The city of Yonkers carried out a $48 million daylighting project in the 2010s to remove the culvert that the river flows through under Yonkers and bring the river to the surface. The project uncovered the river for six blocks in Downtown Yonkers. The newly surfaced river is the centerpiece of an urban park in Getty Square, Downtown Yonkers.

The first phase of the project removed a parking lot that covered a two-block section of the river in the Getty Square neighborhood of downtown Yonkers. Ground was broken on December 15, 2010, and the work was completed in December 2011. Work on the second phase, to expose the river in the Mill Street Courtyard, began on March 19, 2014 and was completed by August 2016. The project stimulated real estate investment in the area. The third phase of the daylighting project, consisting of a short section at New Main Street, was completed in November 2018; it consists of a 1.25-acre (5,100 m^{2}) park with a water wheel and plants.

== Recreation ==
The river affords some of the few remaining open spaces in Westchester County. Near Ardsley and Dobbs Ferry and Irvington, the river passes through V. Everit Macy Park, popular for picnicking and fishing in Woodlands Lake. Butternut Ridge Park contains the Tarrytown Lakes reservoirs and a hiking trail.

Two bicycle trails run along parts of the river: the North County Trailway and the South County Trailway, which run from Van Cortlandt Park in the Bronx to Putnam County.

The Saw Mill was also known as the closest trout fishing river to New York City. In the early 2000s, it was stocked with a few hundred trout each year. The lower river specifically is a good trout river.

== Hydrology ==
The USGS maintains a stream gauge on the Saw Mill just above the river's mouth in Yonkers. Mean discharge since 1944 has been 32 cubic feet (0.91 m^{3}) per second, with extremes of 1,840 cubic feet (52 m^{3}) during the April 2007 nor'easter and 0.11 cubic feet (3,100 cm^{3}). Average annual precipitation in the watershed is 46.2 inches (1,170 mm).

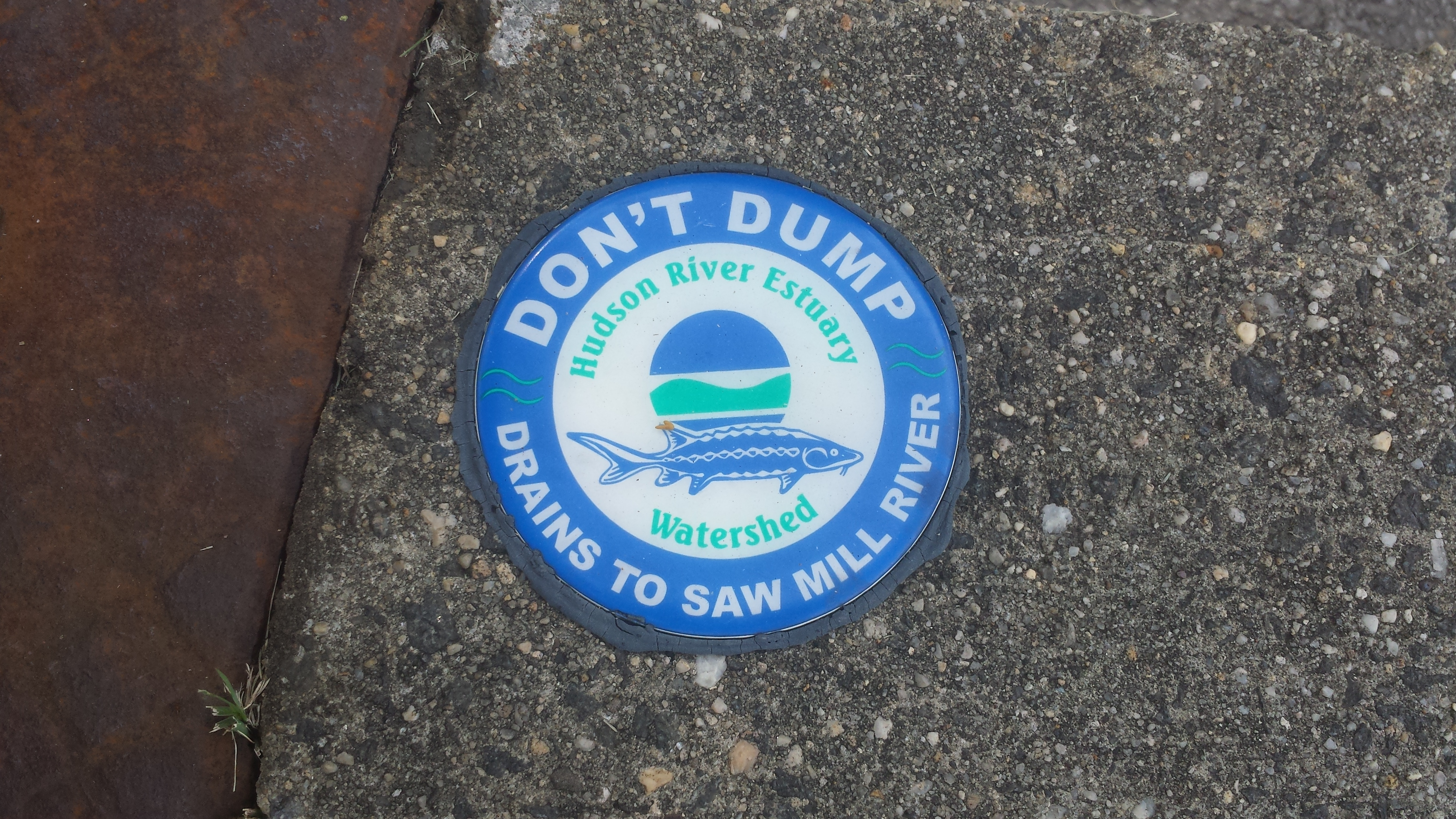
Saw Mill River Sewer Marker

The Saw Mill River's water quality varies, reflecting its history and surroundings. Its headwaters in the town of New Castle are considered "relatively healthy". There the river is less disturbed, and its ecosystem supports a diversity of organisms. In Yonkers, where it flows through a concrete-lined channel, there is less life in the water and it is considered to be environmentally impaired. A 1983 United States Geological Survey (USGS) study found that concentrations of heavy metals in the water increased further downstream, a phenomenon observed with many other pollutants in the river and correlated with the urbanization around and above its mouth. DDT was detected in the streambed sediments throughout the river. In its final 6 miles (9.7 km), more than 50 micrograms of PCBs were found per kilogram of water. In the 1990s, the USGS found that of the 35 Hudson tributaries it tested, the Saw Mill had the worst levels of cadmium, copper, mercury, nickel and zinc in the sediments near its mouth, and among the worst nationwide (however, only the river's manganese levels were found to exceed federal standards). It is believed to add more pollution to the Hudson than any other single tributary.

Unusually for a river, the Saw Mill's waters have consistently had a slightly alkaline pH, suggesting it has not been as affected by acid rain as other Hudson tributaries. In 1951, a state Department of Health survey reported pH between 7.25 and 9.1. Four decades later, another study found pH readings rising steadily from 7.59 in Chappaqua to 8.24 in Yonkers. Similarly, a 2007 Manhattan College study done for the New York State Water Resources Institute found a median low of 7.36 in Chappaqua and a median high of 7.81 near Torre Road in Yonkers, with a drop to 7.67 at the tunnel, for a total median for the river of 7.59. The lowest recorded pH in the year-long study was 7.1 at Chappaqua with the highest reading, 8.17, at Torre Road. All results were between 6.5 and 8.5, the range required by state regulations.

The 1983 USGS study also classified the water quality of the entire river. The first 14.5 miles (23.3 km) from the river's source in Chappaqua was classified as suitable for any purpose besides drinking. The next 6.0 miles (9.7 km) was classified as being safe to drink. The last 3.0 miles (4.8 km) of the river from the sewage treatment plant to the Hudson was determined to be unsafe to drink, bathe in or fish in. The water was only safe for agricultural and industrial use.

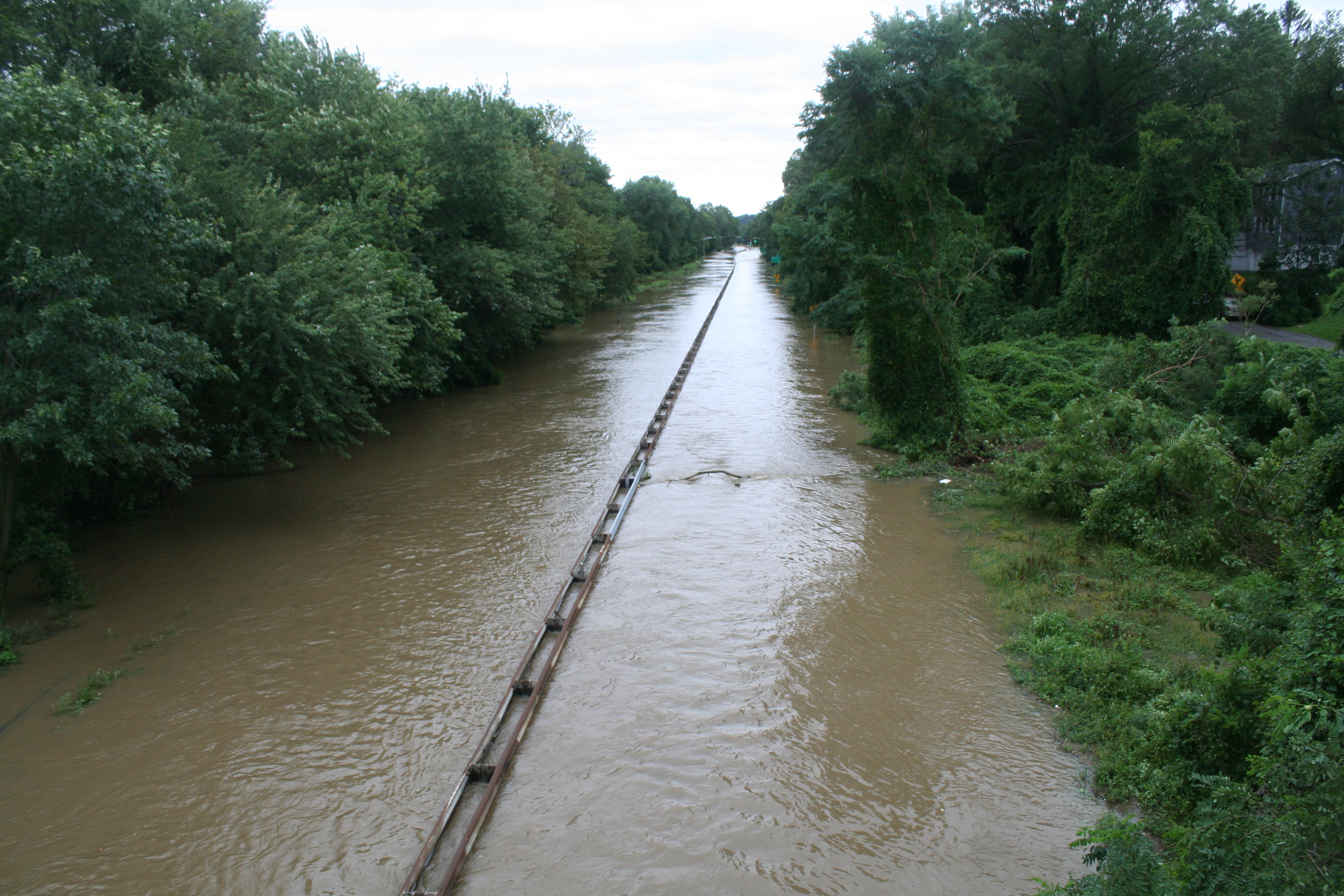
Saw Mill River Parkway flooded after Hurricane Irene

In regulations adopted in 1985 and amended in 2008, New York's Department of Environmental Conservation (DEC) divides the river into four water-quality regions similar to those in the 1983 USGS study. The first 1,100 feet (340 m) from the Saw Mill's mouth is affected by the Hudson's tides and thus is often salty like the river at that point. It is considered Saline Class B surface water, to be kept suitable for primary and secondary contact recreation such as swimming, boating and fishing, and capable of supporting "fish, shellfish and wildlife propagation and survival." The next section extends to the tailwater at the Yonkers sewage plant impoundment, and is Class C fresh water, with the same purposes, to the extent that "other factors" do not limit them. From there to the Woodlands Lake inlet is the third section, designated as Class A fresh water, to be kept clean enough for drinking. The remainder to the source is the fourth section, designated Class B, or fresh water kept to the same standards as the salt water above the river's mouth. Tributaries, named and unnamed, and subtributaries are generally held to the same standards as the section into which they drain.

A 1991 study by Irene Gruenfeld, a Williams College undergraduate, measured various pollutants at eight points along the river, from just below the duck pond in Chappaqua to inside the tunnel in Yonkers. The levels increased as the river flowed along, suggesting that most pollutants, especially dissolved salts, came from urban runoff instead of any single point source. The exception was PCBs, which rose drastically south of Elmsford (a finding that concurred with an earlier study) and then doubled in Yonkers. The study noted that this suggested a point source, perhaps a known burial site for used capacitors in the Elmsford area, yet Gruenfeld argued that cleaning up this and other possible point sources would not eliminate PCBs in the river. While the PCBs in the river were found somewhat biodegraded, chlordane levels are high enough that DEC recommends eating no more than a half-pound (230 g) of fish or eel from the Saw Mill per month.

A 2004–05 EPA study of the river rated the water quality 6 out of 100. The study also discovered that dissolved oxygen levels in the water were low because there were few organisms, poor sediment, and little plant life in the river. Although storm water from residential neighborhoods added dissolved oxygen, it also brought ammonia from fertilizer. The Army Corps of Engineers found that the channeling prevented aquatic life from sustaining itself; few fish naturally spawn in the river because of the cement casing and culvert at its mouth.

Two years later, a joint study by Manhattan College and the New York State Water Resources Institute found high levels of human fecal bacteria in the water, likely due to municipal wastewater. All 12 sites exceeded the state maximum of a monthly median of 200 organisms per 100 milliliters (ml) over five months. Levels were, as with most of the river's other pollutants, generally the highest near the mouth. However, the uppermost sampling site in the study, at the Chappaqua Metro-North station recorded the greatest single reading of any site, 1.2 × 10^{5} organisms per 100 ml, as well as the second-highest; the researchers speculated that this was due to sewer overflow in the area at the times of those readings. Most of the high coliform readings came after rainfall except at the two sites furthest downstream; the study theorized that some older buildings in this area of Yonkers may still discharge sewage directly to the river. Since most of the Saw Mill River flows under the shade of a forest canopy, the bacteria may be less likely to be inactivated by sunlight than in other streams.

The riverbanks in Yonkers are often lined with tires, shopping carts, plastic bottles, and other trash. In 2008, DEC found trash and pollution from the river's mouth to the end of the tunnel. "Urban refuse (tires, bottles, cans, etc.) lines much of the lower river," it reported. "Oil/gasoline slicks are regularly observed along this segment."

The stretches further upriver were slightly better. Between the end of the tunnel and Woodlands Lake, the river was still found to be impaired for recreation, drinking and aquatic life, but less strewn with litter, and as a whole the habitat was merely stressed. Above that point, the Saw Mill's waters were merely stressed for aquatic life and recreation, with only fish consumption considered to be impaired. DEC did not know the sources of pollutants in this stretch and called for further research."

== Geology ==
The Saw Mill's basin is part of the Manhattan Hills in the New England Uplands physiographic region. It is primarily underlain by metamorphic rock such as gneiss, schist and marble. They can be seen in some bedrock outcrops in and around the river.

Soils in the river and its basin reflect past glaciation in the area. Glacial till covers much of the river bottom in its headwaters. Further downstream there is stratified drift and alluvium in the sediments.

== Flora and fauna ==
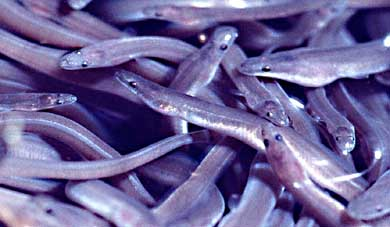
Juvenile American eels

The American eel lives in the Saw Mill River and its tributaries. Commonly bred in the Atlantic Ocean, the eels maneuver through the river's tunnel under Yonkers before reaching the more natural parts of the river farther upstream. The eels also scale a 20-foot (6.1 m) dam before reaching Woodlands Lake. Growing up to 5 feet (1.5 m) in length upstream, the eels return to the ocean via the Hudson River to spawn. The planned installation of trash-catching nets along the daylighted portion of the river would prevent the eels from leaving the river to reproduce.

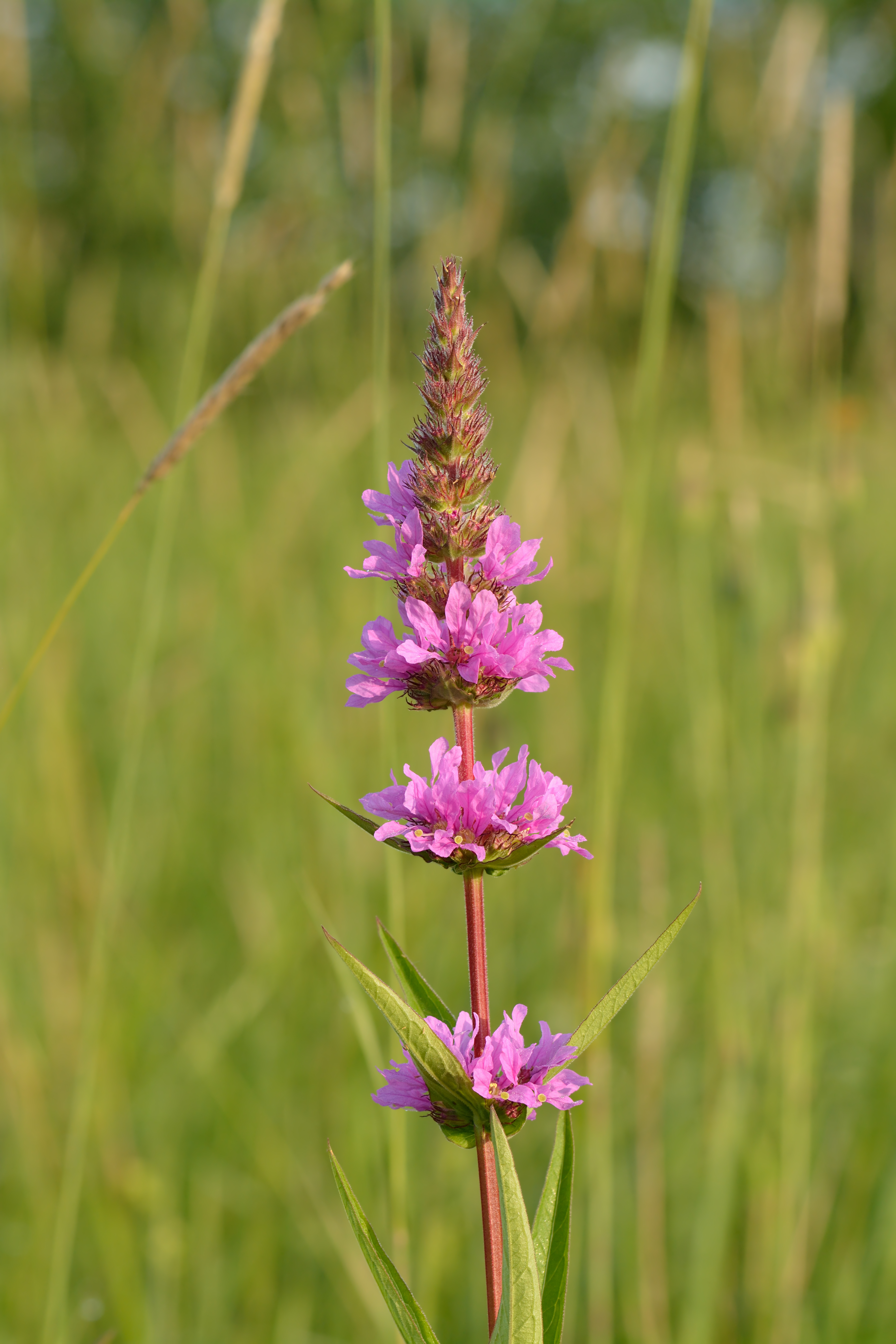
Purple Loosestrife

More fish have been discovered in the newly daylighted section of the river. Baby eastern blacknose dace and tessellated darter have been spotted in the river in addition to trout. In addition, wood frogs, eastern painted turtles, and redbreast sunfish live in the river too. All of these species have been hurt by the industrialization of the river.

About 10 to 20 white-tailed deer per square mile (2.6 to 5.2 deer per square kilometer) live along the river and the parkway, more than the ecosystem can carry. They eat low-lying plants, shrubs, and tree saplings, reducing the food supply for smaller animals. The deer also collide with cars—in Hastings, about 1.6 times per month.

Beavers can also be found along the river, building small dams along the river. Night herons, ducks, and other birds are also present along the river.

Numerous invasive plants live along the Saw Mill River. Porcelain berry is a vine with white berries that wraps around native trees and strangles them. Oriental bittersweet is also present along the river, and it is slowly displacing the native American bittersweet. Oriental bittersweet can also form hybrids with the native bittersweet and making identification harder. Japanese honeysuckle and Japanese knotweed are two other invasive vines native to Asia. In addition, purple loosestrife, a perennial herb with magenta flower stalks, is also present along the river.

Native trees on the river include the pin oak and staghorn sumac. These trees were found along Woodlands Lake, but can be found throughout the entire Hudson Valley. Other native plants include evening primrose, an invasive species in Europe, and wild lettuce.

== See also ==
- List of rivers of New York
