= Woodlands Lake =

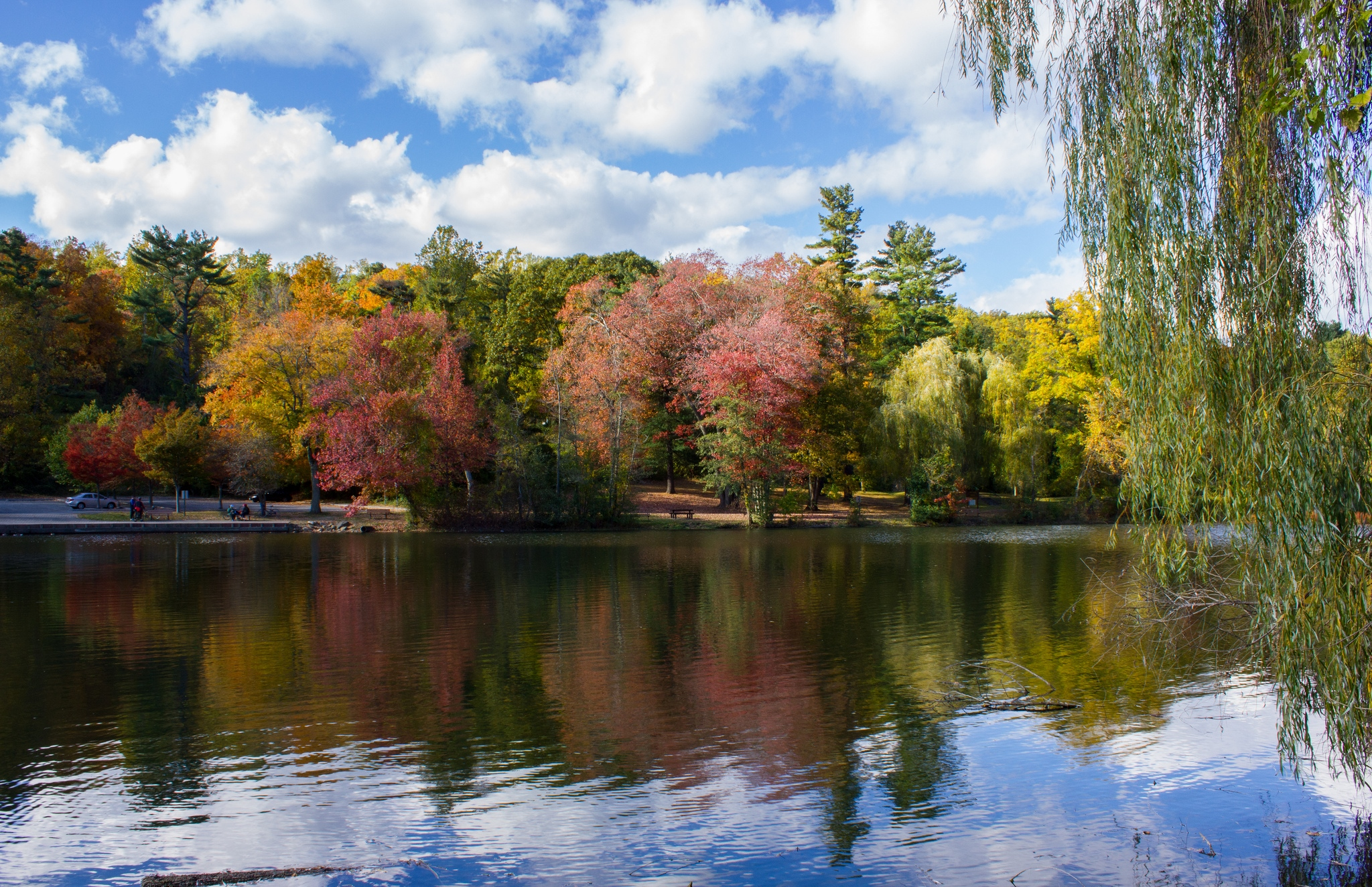
- Woodlands Lake in VE Macy Park

- Location within New York
- Location: Greenburgh, New York
- Coordinates: 41.026°N 73.844°W
- Type: reservoir

Woodlands Lake was a reservoir in Greenburgh, New York. An impoundment of the Saw Mill River, it was located adjacent to VE Macy Park. In 2022, the reservoir's dam was condemned by the Westchester County Department of Parks. The dam was subsequently removed causing the reservoir to drain and revert to a free-flowing river.

== History ==
The area surrounding Woodlands Lake was once part of Philipsburg Manor the estate belonging to Frederick Philipse III, a royalist whose land was confiscated during the American Revolution. In 1816, Joseph Howland purchased 100-acre tract along the Saw Mill River along with the sawmill that was located there, and for many years afterward the property became known as Howland's Mill and Howland's Mill Pond. Mr. Howland lived in a mansion near the pond.

The waterfall was created by building a dam across the Saw Mill River, and was used to power the sawmill, a common practice until the 19th century. At some point the lake was renamed Woodlands Lake. Midway into the 19th century, Woodlands Lake Waterfall and its surrounding area was owned by a number of financiers including Cyrus W. Field as well as J.P. Morgan.

In 1869, the New York and Boston Railroad built a railroad line on the east bank of the lake between Highbridge and Brewster. After some acquisitions and receiverships, the railroad became known as the New York and Putnam Railroad by 1894 (thanks to Morgan) and eventually became the Putnam Division of the New York Central Railroad. The railroad installed a small platform station at the edge of the dam named Woodlands station.

The lake became a popular recreational area, beginning sometime in the late 19th century. It was a place where bathers and swimmers used to show off to one another. It was also a spot that hosted traveling circuses, provided picnic areas it provided picnic areas where ladies and gentlemen could go for an outing and a barbecue. At the beginning of the automobile age, it had a place where families could park their cars in the shade while they had family picnics and had the accessibility of having a food van nearby to provide the food they didn't bring to the park. Before or during this period, the mansion was replaced with the Woodlands Lake Hotel complex and the Reinhardt Hotel replaced the resorts in the Woodlands Lake Waterfall area. The sounds of German folk music were often heard from the Reinardt Hotel. Eventually, the hotels were also torn down.

In 1923, the Westchester Parks Commission decided to purchase the land from Howland, along with some nearby land owned by J.P. Morgan to create Woodlands Lake Park, but on May 2, 1932 was renamed for Valentine Everit Macy, Sr., a former Westchester County Commissioner. The Saw Mill River Parkway was constructed high above the west bank of the lake between 1926 and 1932, resulting in the demolition of the old Howland Mansions. In place of that mansion was a new roadside restaurant known as Leighton's (later Woodlands Lake and La Cantina). The construction also included replacing the wooden bridge over the dam with a concrete and steel bridge, which was designed to carry automobiles. The road along the bridge crossed the Putnam Division and ended at U.S. Route 9 until the New York State Thruway turned the road into a dead end. Since that time, it has been primarily used as a fishing pier.

On May 29, 1958, the New York Central Railroad terminated passenger service on most of the Putnam Division. The line became a freight only line that was cut back from Lake Mahopac to Eastview in 1963. After merging with Pennsylvania Railroad to form Penn Central in 1968, and taken over by Conrail in 1976, the segment between Eastview and Chancey stations were eliminated on December 2, 1977, including along the east bank of the lake. The line was replaced with the South County Trailway, one of four trails replacing the former line. The road bridge over the dam became a connecting trail to the park, and to this day serves as a connecting trail to the park for hikers, bikers, and strollers.

Meanwhile, tolls were eliminated from the Saw Mill River Parkway in Yonkers in 1994, and the La Cantina Restaurant was closed in November 1995. Subsequent efforts to lease and reopen the building, even as something other than a restaurant have been met with no success. Rather than providing food for drivers and revenue for the park, on June 24, 2001, the Westchester County Parks Commission decided to unveil a memorial to the Great Famine of Ireland behind the parking lot north of the former restaurant on the west bank of the lake. However, the restaurant was briefly used for the 2019 Netflix film The Irishman, dressed up as a Texaco gas station and Stuckey's restaurant from the 1950s.
