= Putnam County Trailway =

Bicycle and pedestrian trail in Putnam County, New York

Coordinates: 41.41463°N 73.68620°W

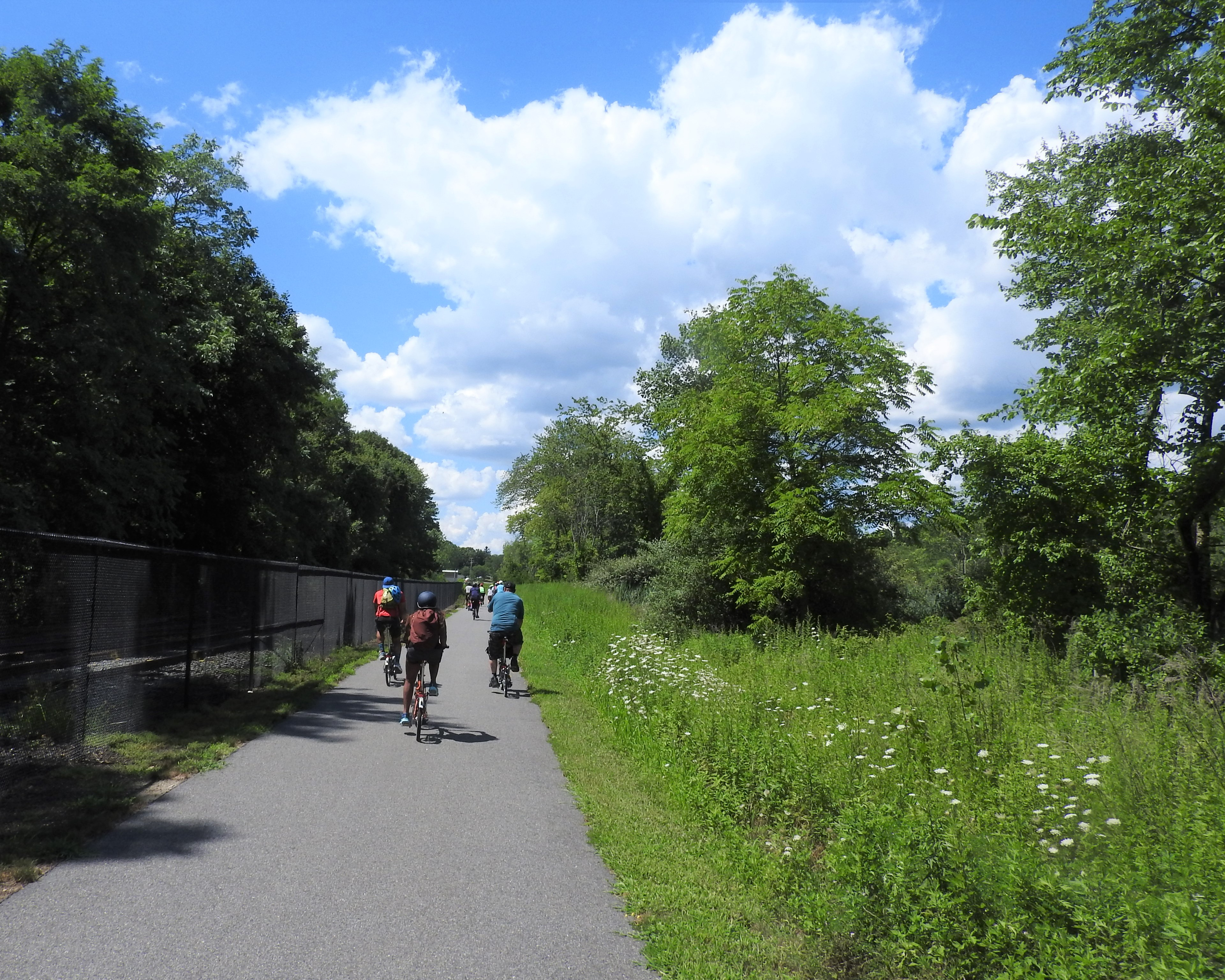
- Length: 12 mi (19 km)
- Location: Putnam County; New York
- Trailheads: Baldwin Place, New York; Brewster, New York
- Use: Hiking, Bicycling
- Website: Putnam County Department of Parks and Recreation

The Putnam County Trailway is a paved 12-mile (19 km) bicycle and pedestrian trail in Putnam County, New York. With few exceptions, it follows the former right-of-way of the New York and Putnam Railroad from the northern end of the North County Trailway at the Putnam County line in Baldwin Place north, then east, to Carmel. In 2011 the trail was extended east to Brewster. In late summer 2018, a final section bypassing portions of Putnam Ave in Brewster, which was formerly closed off with construction barriers and signs, has been opened. The Brewster station of the Metro-North Railroad is a short distance away.

The trail is also a part of the statewide Empire State Trail, connecting the North County Trailway to the Maybrook Trailway to Pawling.

The Putnam County Trailway features mile markers giving the distance along the original railroad right of way from its former southern terminus in New York City. Marker 42.2 is located at Baldwin place, and marker 53 is visible shortly before the northern end of the trail.
