= Hammond House (Eastview, New York) =

Historic house in New York, United States

- U.S. National Register of Historic Places
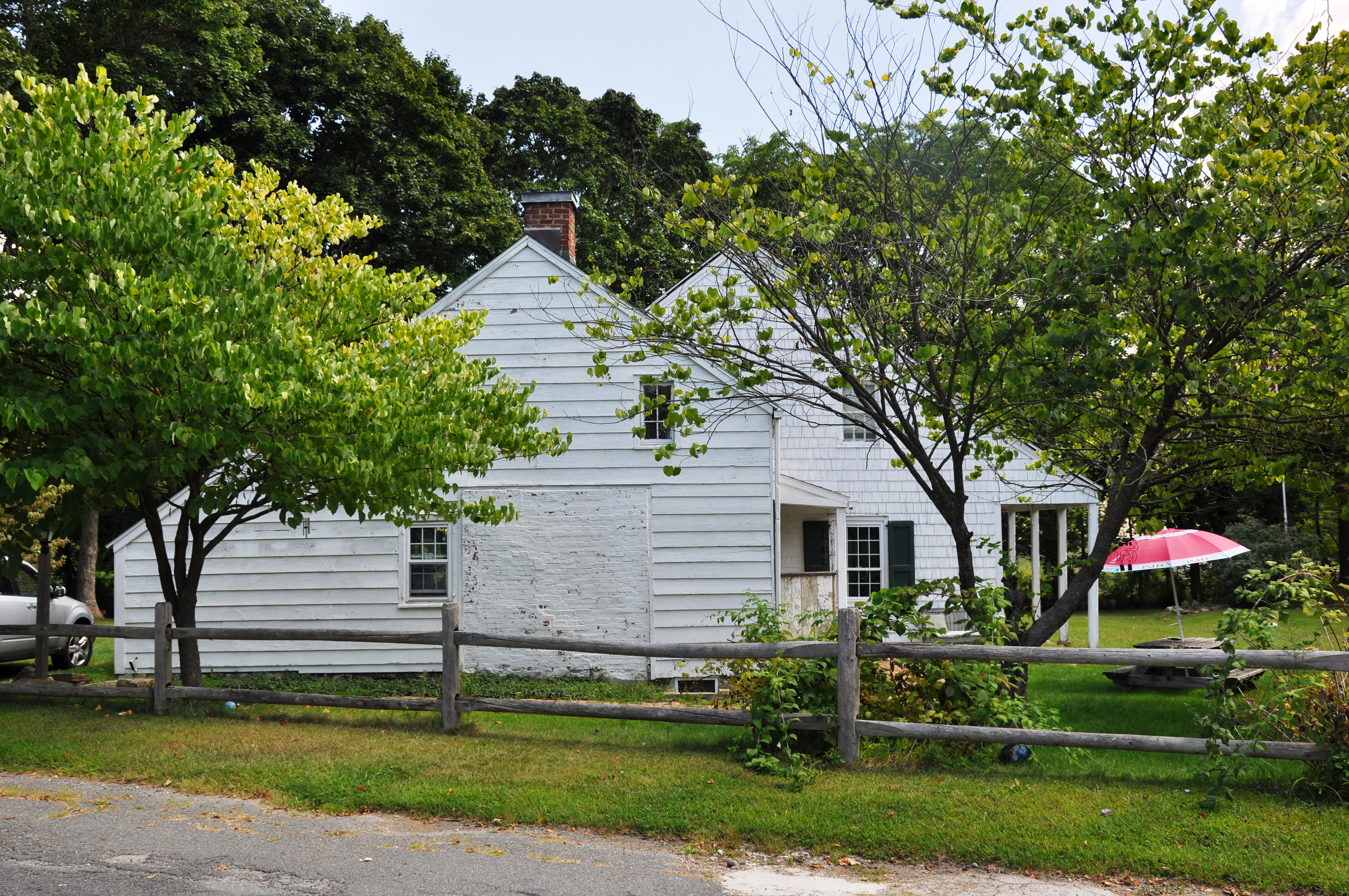
- West profile and south elevation, 2014

- Location within New York Location within the United States
- Location: Eastview, NY
- Nearest city: White Plains
- Coordinates: 41°4′34″N 73°48′42″W
- Area: less than one acre
- Built: 1720
- Architect: William Hammond
- NRHP reference No.: 80002790
- Added to NRHP: May 6, 1980

The Hammond House is located on Grasslands Road (New York State Route 100C) in the Eastview (Note: Per the note below, the house has a Valhalla mailing address.) section of the town of Mount Pleasant, New York, United States. It is a wooden building whose oldest part dates to the 1720s, with later additions during the 19th century. In 1980 it was added to the National Register of Historic Places.

It is one of the oldest houses in Westchester County, and one of only two remaining tenant houses from the Philipsburg Manor. It also has a rich Revolutionary War history. Col. James Hammond, son of the original owner, commanded the Patriot Westchester militia. Some historical evidence supports the longstanding local legend that George Washington visited the house for a brief conference with Hammond in the summer of 1780, leaving shortly before the house was surrounded by Loyalist militia or British troops.

During the war the Hammond family bought the land; they held on to it until the 1920s, when New York City acquired the property to protect its watershed. It was planning to demolish the structure, when the county historical society bought the deteriorating house and restored it for use as a historic house museum. It remained open in that capacity for another half-century. When the society shifted its focus to primarily serving as an archive, it sold it to New York Medical College, which used as a medical research laboratory for a decade. It was again saved from potential demolition by two brothers who bought it in the 1990s. They have been restoring it.

== Building ==
The house occupies a 1-acre (4,000 m^{2}) lot on the east corner of a short, unnamed dead-end street that runs off Grasslands from the north roughly midway between Saw Mill River Road (New York State Route 9A) and the Sprain Brook Parkway in the Eastview section of the town of Mount Pleasant. (Note: The National Park Service, the agency charged with keeping the National Register, used "Hawthorne vicinity" when it announced the property's listing in 1980 (U.S. National Park Service (February 3, 1981). "Weekly NRHP listings for 1980" (PDF). Federal Register. p. 24. Archived from the original (PDF) on August 30, 2010.). Why it chose to do so, when the NRHP application had explicitly used Eastview, is not known. Had the agency based its description of the house's location on its mailing address, as it has for several other properties in the county where postal ZIP Codes and municipalities do not have exactly coterminous boundaries, the house would be described as being in the vicinity of Valhalla to the east, whose 10595 ZIP Code it lies within, like the John Hartford House, a National Historic Landmark on the campus of nearby Westchester Community College, which was listed as being in Valhalla (Lower Westchester County (Map). 1:28,500. Hagstrom. 2006. § P-25. ISBN 0880979828.). The house's current owner also gives its address as Valhalla. Consensus among editors was for this article to use the more historically accurate Eastview as the property's location rather than the NPS's continued use of Hawthorne.) The terrain is gently rolling, with the land across the road sloping to the south towards Mine Brook, a tributary of the Saw Mill River to the west. While the area is open and clear, there are no other residences nearby, with most development taking the form of large building complexes.

New York Medical College and Westchester Medical Center are to the north, across open space where new construction has gone up recent years. Across the road to the south is a large wooded area, with office parks beyond. Big-box retailers and associated strip malls are located along Saw Mill.

A line of trees along the road and a wooden fence on the other bounds set off the lot, with the street serving as a driveway. The house itself is in three sections. The main block is a five-bay one-and-a-half-story structure with a shingled gabled roof pierced by a single brick chimney in the center. It is sided in clapboard.

Running the full length of the south (front) facade is a porch. The overhanging roof eave is supported by six square wooden pillars. The main entrance, a paneled and glazed wooden door, is located the center. It has wrought iron hardware and a glazed transom above.

All the windows on the first story front and sides are 12-over-8 double-hung sash flanked by wooden shutters; those on the west facade are original to the house. The attic windows are six-over-six double-hung sash without shutters. On the north side, where fenestration is less regular, two shed-roofed dormer windows pierce the roof on the west side.

The two-bay west wing was built separately elsewhere, moved and later attached to the main block. Its roof is similarly gabled, but in a saltbox style, lower in the north than the south. Like the main block, the roof and sides are clapboard and shingled respectively. However, a large section of the west wall is bricked in where the fireplace was, and the chimney is at the end, reflecting that alteration as well.

A small shed-roofed porch supported by a single square wooden pillar shelters the house's secondary entrance, protected also by a modern screen door. The other front bay has a 12-over-8 double-hung sash window like those on the main block. On the west elevation is one six-over-six double-hung sash north of the bricking, and two six-light casement windows at the attic level, which does not rise as high as the main block.

The east wing is a two-story, two-bay addition. It has the same exterior treatment and gabled roof as the main block and west wing. The roof's slope is slightly gentler than the main block, and like the west wing its chimney is on the end. The first-story windows are six-over-six; the upper story has the same six-light casement seen on the west wing.

Inside, the main front entrance opens into a small front hall. On the west is the original parlor, with its original fireplace; opposite is the original kitchen. A large bedroom, with a fireplace, and several smaller rooms adjoin the kitchen. From the parlor is the western addition, now the kitchen wing, with two antechambers on its kitchen. It, too, has a fireplace.

The rooms all have their original wideboard flooring. All rooms have plaster walls, except for two in the parlor, which are wood. Some of the original wooden doors remain as well. A main staircase in the rear and a secondary one in the kitchen lead up to the unfinished attics. There is no basement.

== History ==
After two relatively stable centuries, the house's more recent history has seen more periods of uncertainty.

=== 1719–1860: Construction and expansion ===
Bermuda-born William Hammond came to the colonial Province of New York in the early years of the 18th century. He eventually earned enough to lease 200 acres (81 ha) of farmland on the Philipsburg Manor, the colonial land grant that took up what is today most of eastern Westchester County. He began building a house there in 1719, now the main block of the existing building, and finished it the following year.

The house is architecturally noteworthy for several reasons. First, its full-length front porch under the overhanging roof is similar to that on the Elijah Miller House, also listed on the National Register, in nearby North White Plains, built a few years later. Second, Hammond built the house without a basement and with its structural beams dovetailing with each other, so that the house could easily be dismantled, moved and reassembled in another location if he lost his lease (it has been described as an early version of a mobile home). Third, of the approximately 200 homes known to have been built by tenant farmers on the manor, it is one of only two that have survived.

Hammond would never need to move. He became a fixture of the community, serving as captain of the local militia from 1755 on. He also became an elder of the Old Dutch Church of Sleepy Hollow, the oldest church in New York and today a National Historic Landmark.

Upon William's death in 1762, his eldest son, James, inherited the house and leasehold. James Hammond followed his father into the local militia, serving as its captain as well when it fought on the Patriot side during the Revolutionary War shortly after he was promoted to lieutenant colonel. In August 1776, he was promoted to full colonel shortly before leading his troops into the Battle of White Plains.

Some recently discovered evidence supports a long-retold story that shortly after George Washington left a brief meeting with Hammond at the house in 1780, it was surrounded by armed Loyalists or British soldiers. Seeking to capture Washington, they instead settled for Hammond, and he was held prisoner on a ship on the Hudson River for a year and a half, then released at the end of the war.

With the end of the war and the beginning of American independence came the end of the manor system. Hammond was able to buy not only the land the house stood on but the surrounding 242 acres (98 ha), where he continued growing wheat and flax. He further followed his father's footsteps to the leadership of the Old Dutch Church in Sleepy Hollow, where he was elected a trustee in 1786.

James Hammond died in 1810. His family inherited the house; it stayed in their ownership for several generations over the course of the 19th century. Several of his descendants distinguished themselves in the military as well.

Twice during their ownership, the house was expanded. In 1835 a small detached cottage on the property was moved and attached to the house, becoming the west wing. A quarter-century later, in 1860, the east wing was built.

=== 1861–present: Ownership changes and preservation ===
The Hammonds eventually departed, and the house was left unoccupied. By the early 20th century it came into the ownership of the New York City Bureau of Water Supply. It was the only improvement on a 157-acre (64 ha) parcel surrounding the important junction of the Catskill and Delaware aqueducts. To better protect the city's water supply, the bureau planned to demolish the neglected and deteriorated structure.

In 1926, however, the Westchester County Historical Society persuaded the city to sell them just the house for $50 ($900 in modern dollars). As part of the transaction, the city retained the right to demolish the structure and the society retained the right to move it, as well as use the acre around the house for its purposes. The society restored the house and reopened it three years later, operating it as a historic house museum, with a "hodge-podge" of displays that inaccurately represented early 19th century farm life as being authentic to the period of the house's construction.

During the next half-century, the house would become known around the county for its museum use. The society did some minor repairs, replacing some floorboards and replastering some walls. After the 1960s, however, it limited its work to routine maintenance, neglecting the building's structural system. The house's 1976 listing coincided with a change in the society's mission from historic preservation to historical research, to the detriment of the house and its contents. Potentially valuable artifacts and records languished in unorganized, insufficiently protected conditions within the house.

By the early 1980s it was obvious that some more work needed to be done. With a grant from the Norcross Wildlife Foundation, the society commissioned a historic structure report. It turned out that repairs would cost $500,000. Since they could not justify that level of spending without assurances that the city would not invoke its right to tear down the house, the society's board tried to persuade the city to donate the underlying acre or sell it to the society at a token price.

Those discussions were unsuccessful, and in 1984 the board turned to another Westchester-based historic preservation organization, Historic Hudson Valley (HHV), which operates and maintains several historic homes, including some National Historic Landmarks, as far north as Annandale-on-Hudson in Dutchess County. The board hoped that HHV would help them with moving the house, the city's preferred option, to the main Philipsburg Manor house in Sleepy Hollow, a site managed by that organization. HHV was interested, but only found the main block worth preserving, as it was the original house.

The society's board was unwilling to sacrifice the wings. So, in 1989, it went public with its predicament and put the house up for sale. It hoped to be able to keep it on the original site, but said it would talk with anyone who had a viable plan for adaptive reuse. The poorly stored artifacts and records were moved to the county's newly built Records Center in Elmsford.

At the end of that year it announced that it had found a buyer—nearby New York Medical College, which was starting to expand in the area to the north of the house, along with Westchester Medical Center, the former Grasslands Hospital. The sale price was undisclosed at the time, but it was reported that the college would pay $50,000 to update the house's electrical and heating systems, as well as repaint both the interior and exterior. The house became its center for field research on Lyme disease, then a growing public health problem during Westchester's summer months.

By 1995, however, the house was again facing the threat of demolition or relocation. Antiques dealer Frederick Rock and his younger brother Michael were able to put together the money to buy it, and spent several years fixing it up so he could live there. A folk music enthusiast, he began hosting regular hootenannies in 1999. These grew into a series of backyard performances featuring artists like The Kennedys, Jack Hardy and Terre and Maggie Roche.

== See also ==
- National Register of Historic Places listings in northern Westchester County, New York
