= South County Trailway =

Rail trail in New York

Coordinates: 41°3′48″N 73°49′9″W

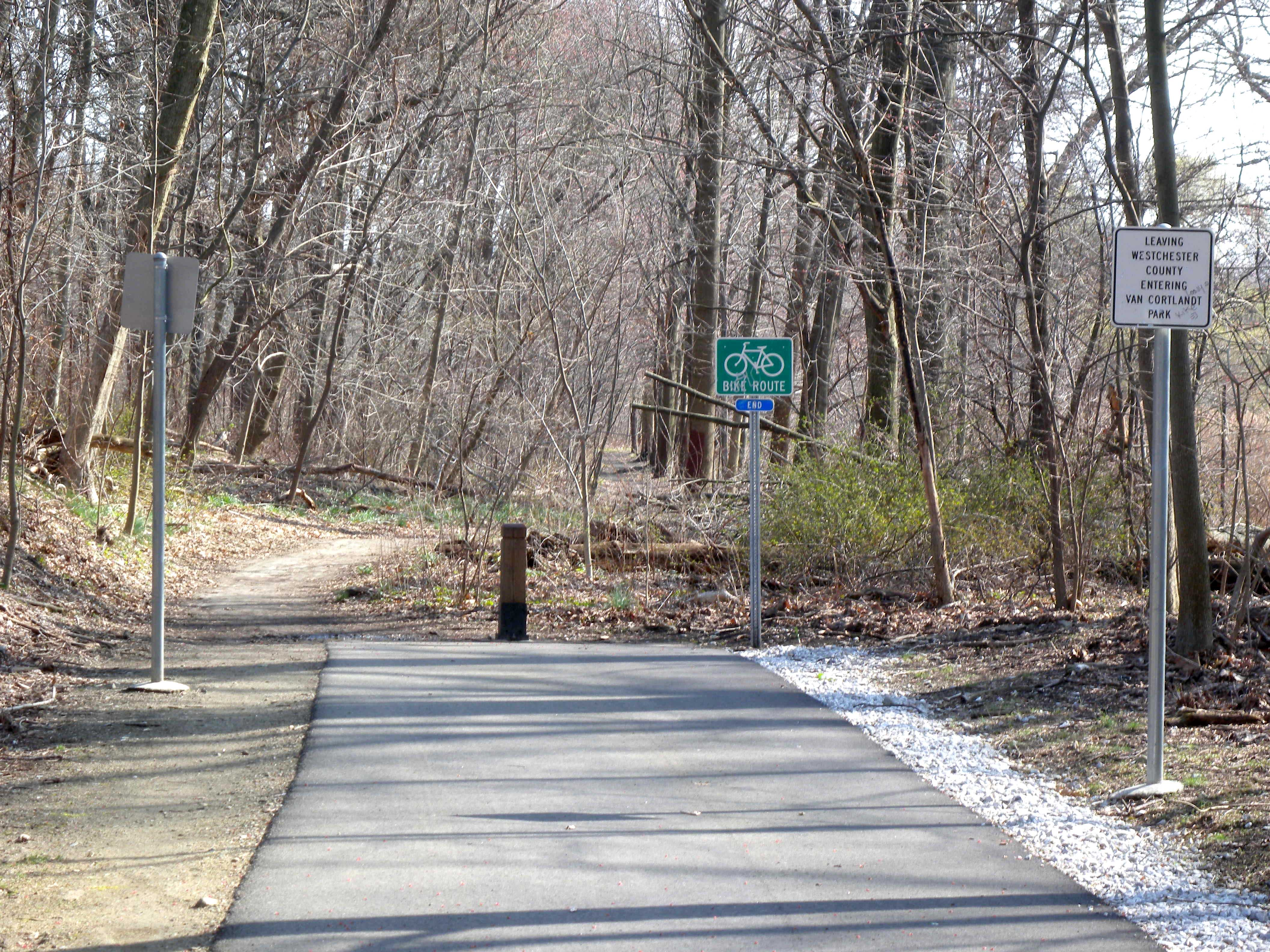
- Looking south as paved South County Trailway ends and enters Van Cortlandt Park in the Bronx. NYC paved this trail in Van Cortlandt Park in August 2020.
- Length: 14.1 mi (22.7 km)
- Location: Westchester County, New York
- Trailheads: Van Cortlandt Park; Eastview, New York
- Use: Hiking, Cycling
- Website: Westchester County Parks

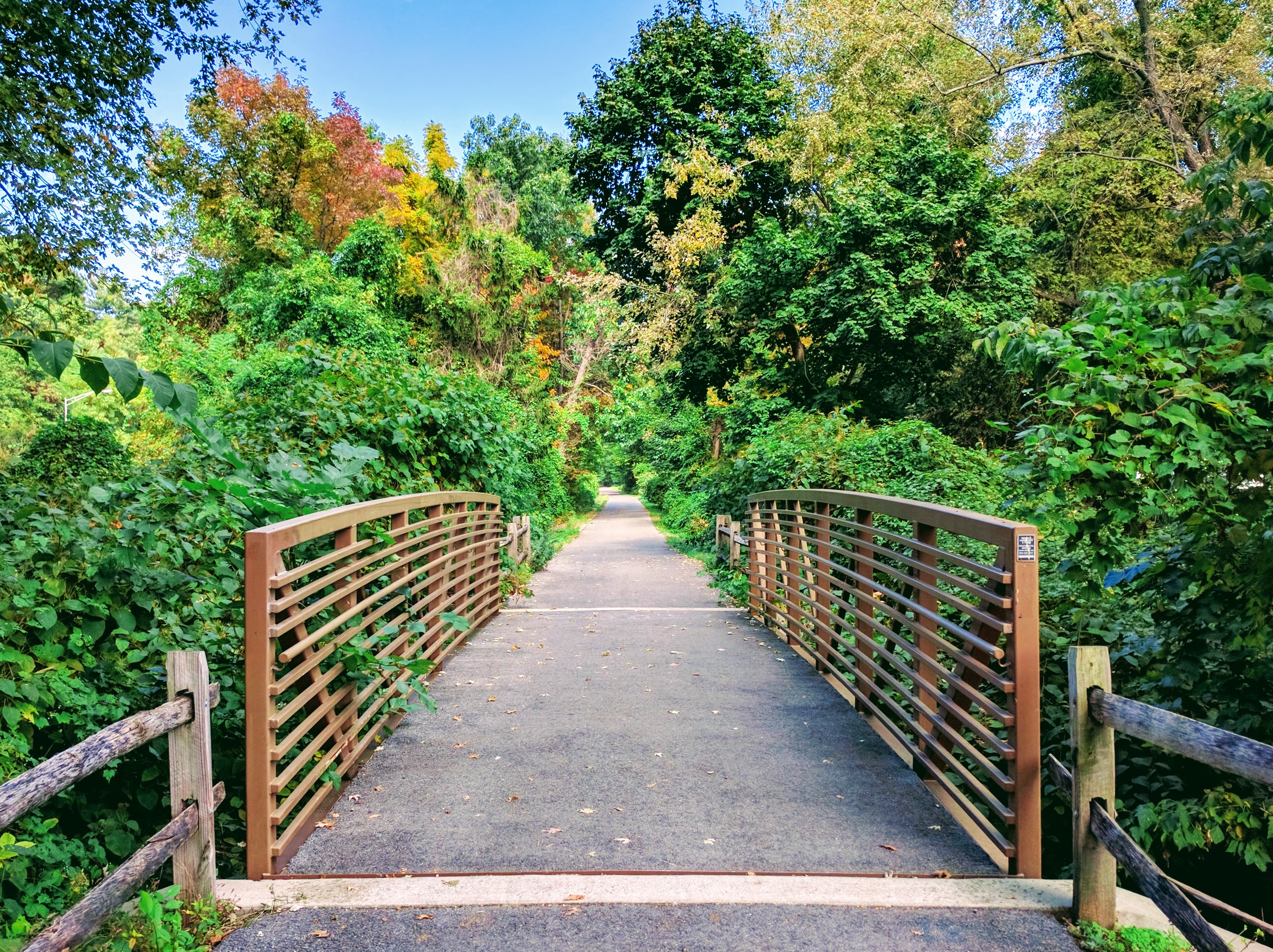
South County Trailway, Yonkers, NY in 2016

The South County Trailway is a 14.1-mile (22.7 km) long rail trail stretching from the Putnam Trail in Van Cortlandt Park in the Bronx to the North County Trailway in Eastview, New York. Westchester County Parks constructed the trailway in segments beginning in 1990 and completed it on October 31, 2017. The first segment opened in August 1999.

The South County Trailway was constructed mostly along the main line of the former New York and Putnam Railroad railbed in Westchester County, New York (also known as "Westchester"). In Eastview it connects to the North County Trailway via a spur trail that runs through Tarrytown Lakes Park. Much of the trail is in the Saw Mill River floodplain, although the southern portion runs along Tibbetts Brook. The Putnam Division provided freight and passenger service from 1881 to 1958 between the Bronx and Putnam County, with freight service lasting until 1962. The railroad served 23 stations in Westchester. Historic marker plaques have been placed at most of the former stations.

The Trailway has become a bicycle commuter route for Westchester residents traveling to jobs in business centers in Elmsford, Getty Square in Yonkers, the Bronx, and Manhattan. The Trailway is not illuminated at night or plowed in winter, making its use difficult but not impossible. Despite initial opposition, it has become one of Westchester's most popular parks. A 2016 housing development called "The Lofts on Saw Mill River" in Hastings-on-Hudson included a pedestrian bridge over the Saw Mill River connecting it to the trailway. Westchester County Parks embarked on construction projects in 2015 and 2017 to close gaps in the trailway. and again in August 2017.

The South County Trailway is also a section of the Empire State Trail, a route that leads north from New York City to Albany and thence either to the Canadian border or to Buffalo. The state trail officially opened at the end of 2020.

A controversy developed in 2013 with the announcement that Westchester County planned to put sponsorship signage along the trail. This plan was canceled shortly after the announcement, after opposition arose.

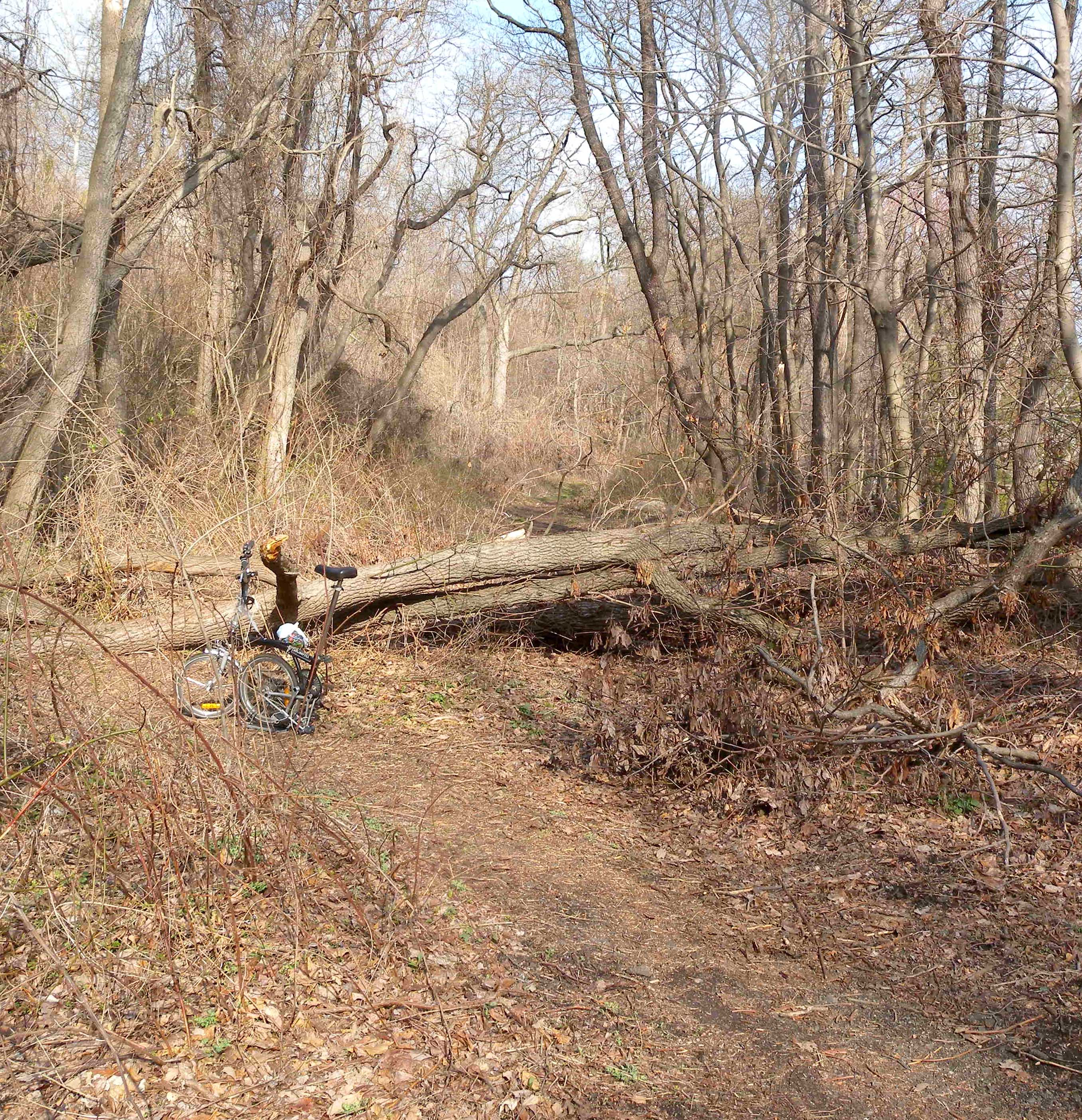
Before paving completion in 2012. Fallen trees across dirt trail.

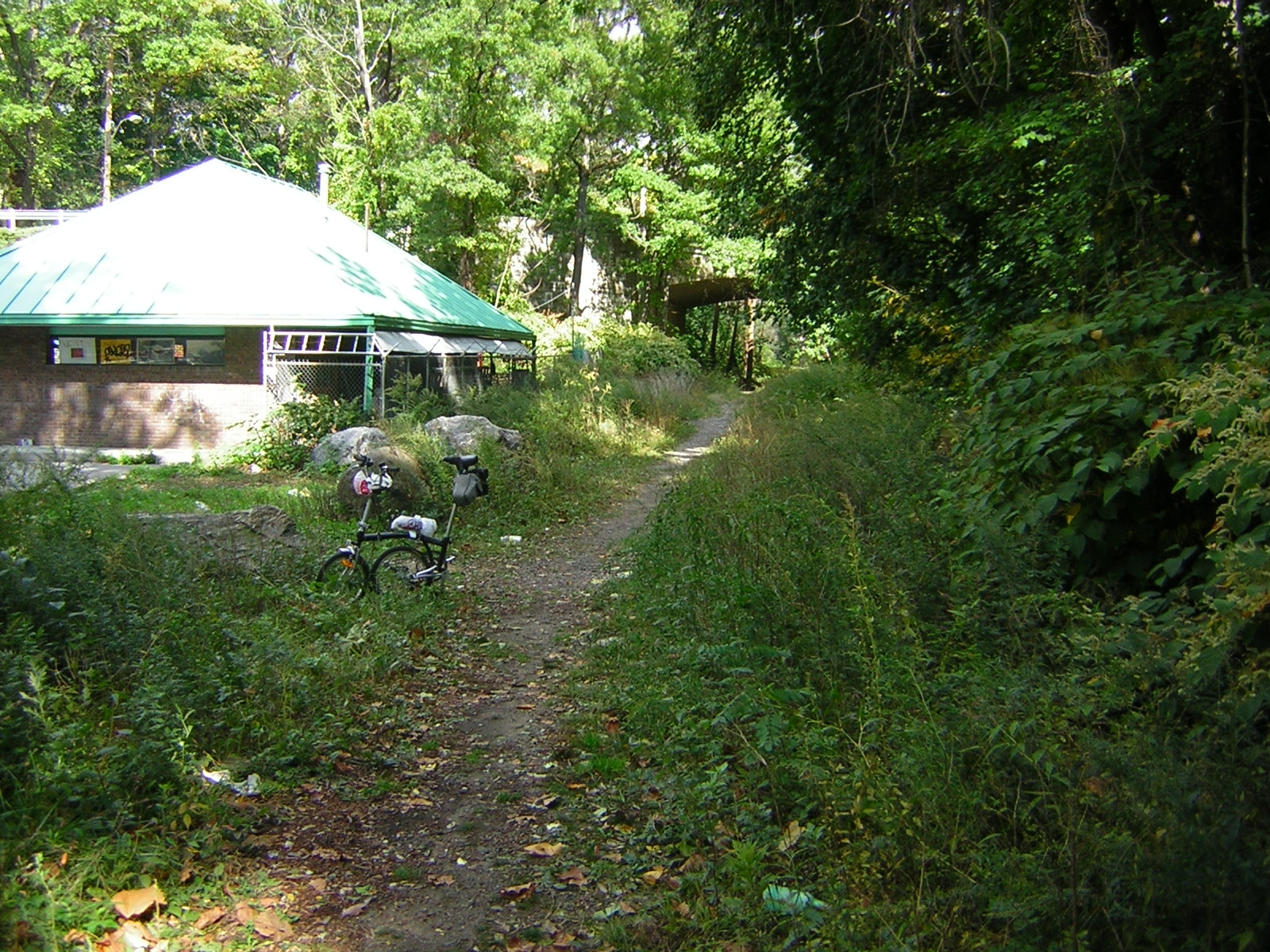
Before paving. Looking north past Bryn Mawr Park station replica, under Palmer Road, 2007

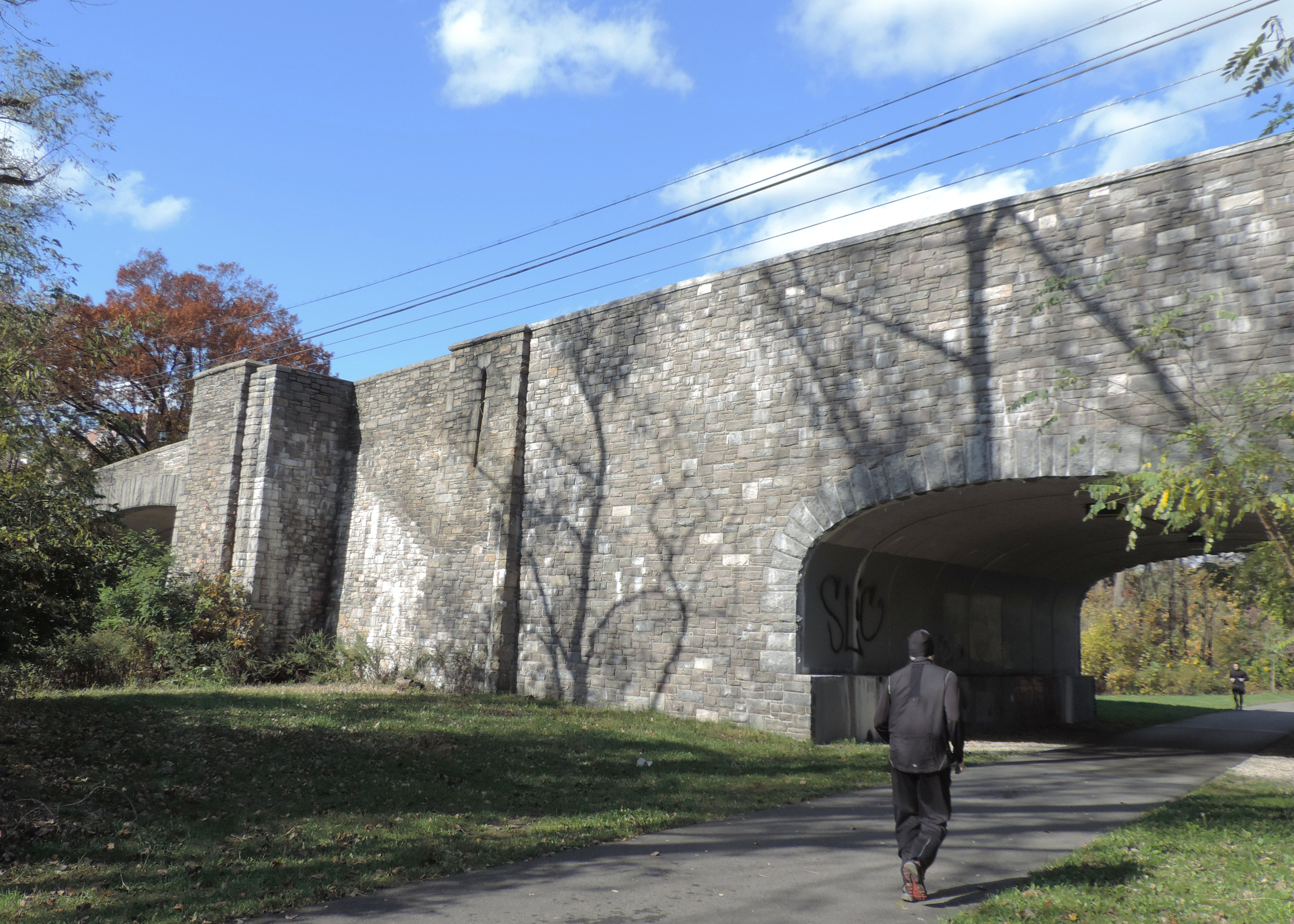
Under a road in northern Yonkers

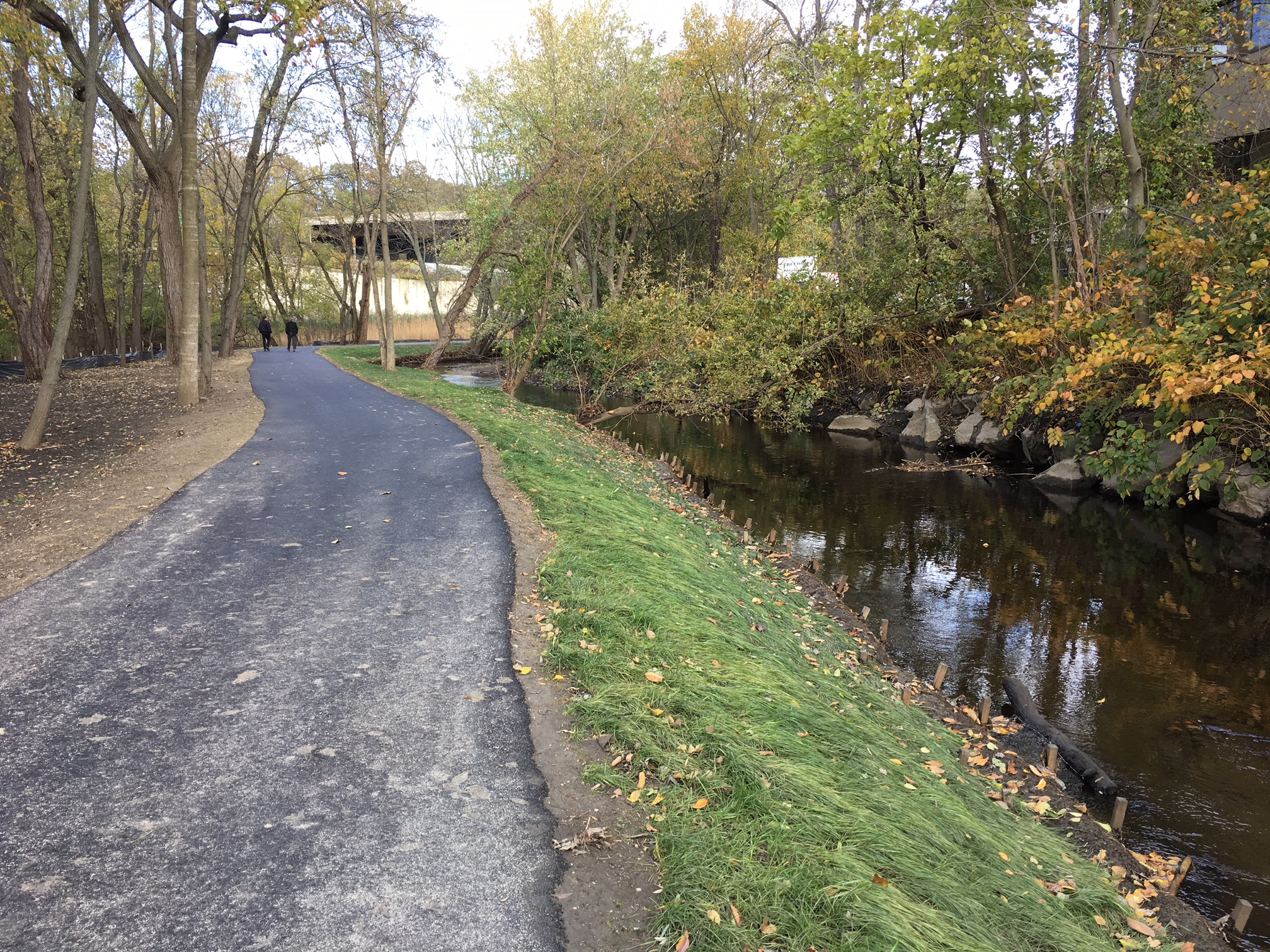
Final completed section in Elmsford, NY north of Route 119 on November 1, 2017, alongside Saw Mill River.

== See also ==
- List of rail trails in New York
