= North County Trailway =

Rail trail in Westchester County, New York

Coordinates: 41.0667°N 73.8050°W

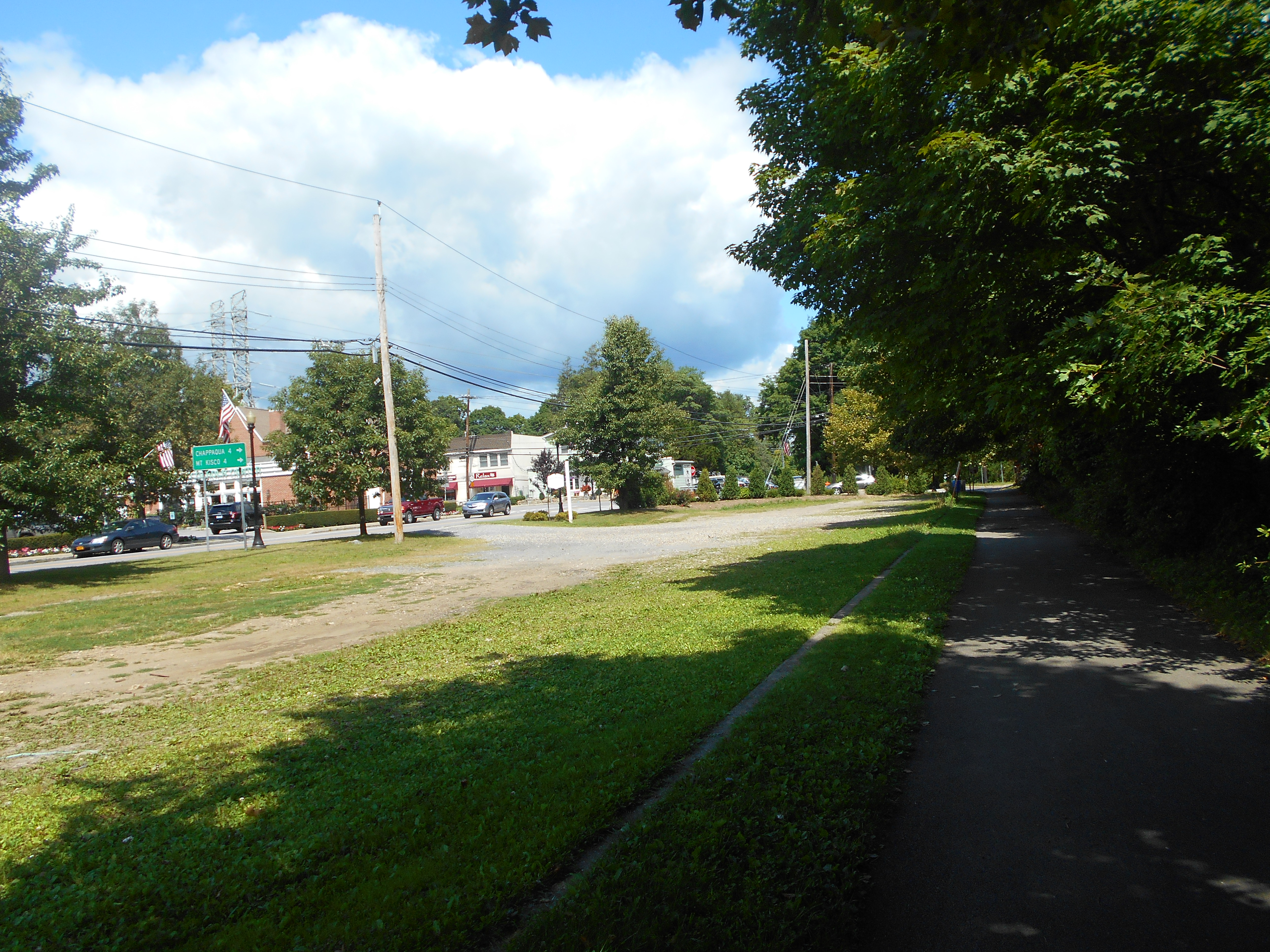
- Site of the former Millwood NY&P station along the North County Trailway.
- Length: 22.1 mi (35.6 km)
- Location: Westchester County; New York
- Trailheads: Baldwin Place, New York; Elmsford, New York
- Use: Hiking, Bicycling
- Website: Westchester County Parks

The North County Trailway is a 22.1-mile (35.6 km) long paved rail trail stretching from Eastview to Baldwin Place in Westchester County, New York. It is also part of the statewide Empire State Trail.

It connects to the South County Trailway in Eastview, also built along the former railroad. It connects through the Eastview parking lot to the Tarrytown Lakes Extension and Tarrytown Lakes Trail to the Old Croton Aqueduct and Tarrytown.

While it is primarily a dedicated multi-use path, trail users are directed by signs to use the shoulders of New York State Route 100 for two sections between Briarcliff Manor and Millwood.

== History ==
The North County Trailway was constructed along the Putnam Division railbed of the former New York Central Railroad ("Old Put"). At its north end it becomes the Putnam County Trailway, which continues along the former railbed to Brewster, New York. The first segment opened in 1981.

The Putnam Division provided passenger service from 1881 to 1958 between the Bronx and Putnam County, with freight service continuing until 1962. The railroad served 23 stations in Westchester County. Historic marker plaques have been placed at most of the former stations.

In 2019, County Executive George Latimer announced that $8.7 million would be dedicated to improving the trailway.

In November 2024, outgoing Westchester County executive proposed renaming both the North and South County Trailways to the Andrew P. O’Rourke Westchester County Trailway. If the Westchester County Board of Legislators adopts this proposal, signs denoting the new name are expected to be ready in Spring of 2025.

== See also ==
- List of rail trails in New York
