= Eastview, New York =

Eastview
- Business district
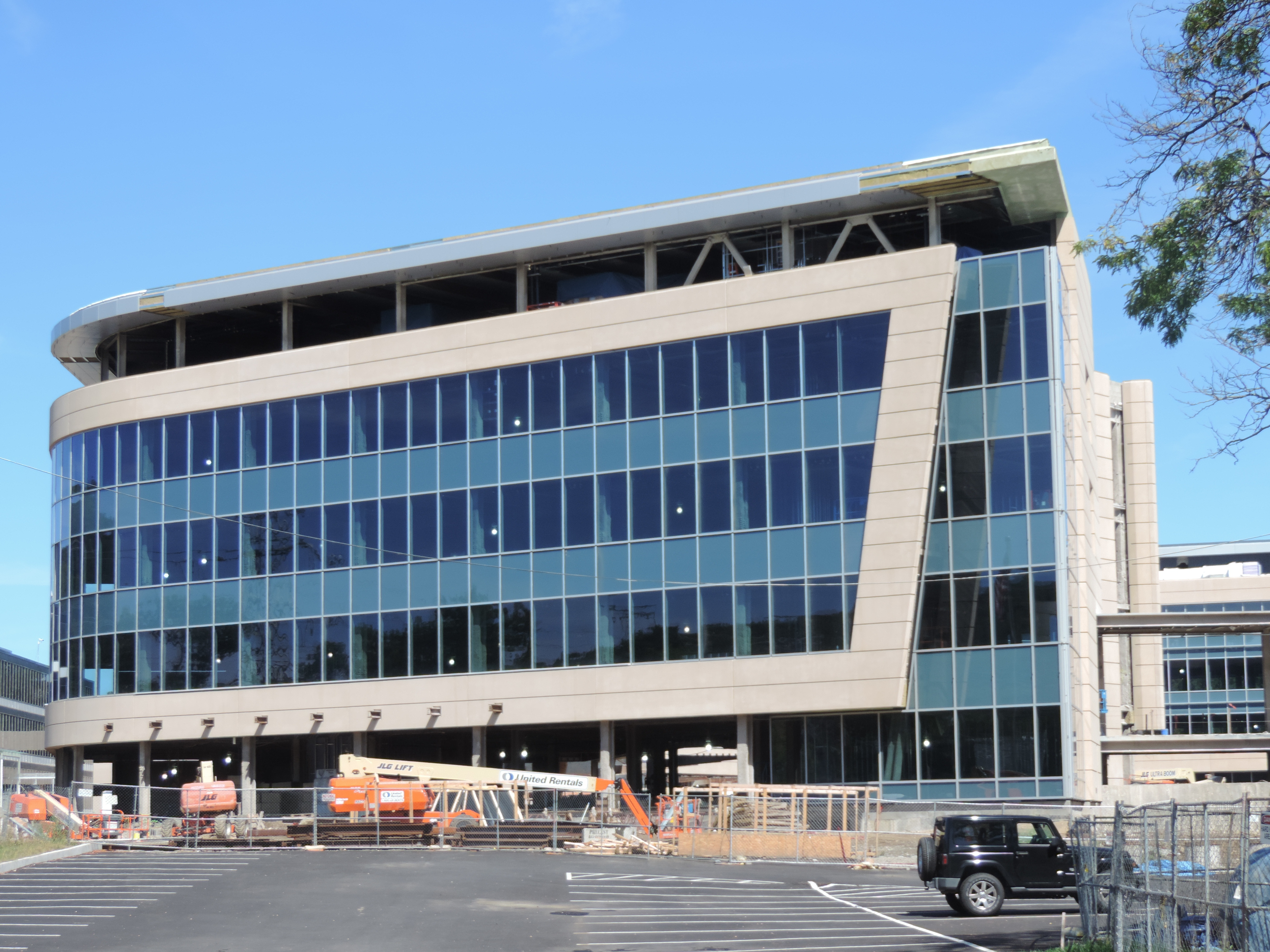
- Headquarters of Regeneron Pharmaceuticals, one of many commercial buildings in Eastview
- Interactive map of Eastview
- Coordinates: 41°04′53.4″N 73°49′45.5″W
- Country: United States
- State: New York
- County: Westchester
- Town: Mount Pleasant
- Time zone: UTC-5 (Eastern (EST))
  - Summer (DST): UTC-4 (EDT)
- Area code: 914
- GNIS feature ID: 972438
- Historic names: East Tarrytown; Knapp's Corners

Eastview (or East View) is a business district and former hamlet in Mount Pleasant, Westchester County, New York, United States, located approximately 25 miles north of Midtown Manhattan. It was primarily residential, and had a post office, railroad station, and school. In the late 1920s, John D. Rockefeller Jr. purchased most of the hamlet's property and razed the buildings. The Hammond House, a National Register of Historic Places-listed farmhouse dating to the 1720s, is located in the district, on New York State Route 100C. Currently, dozens of commercial buildings have been developed in the area. The community is now most prominently known as the global headquarters for Regeneron Pharmaceuticals, which moved into a newly constructed campus in 2014.

== History ==
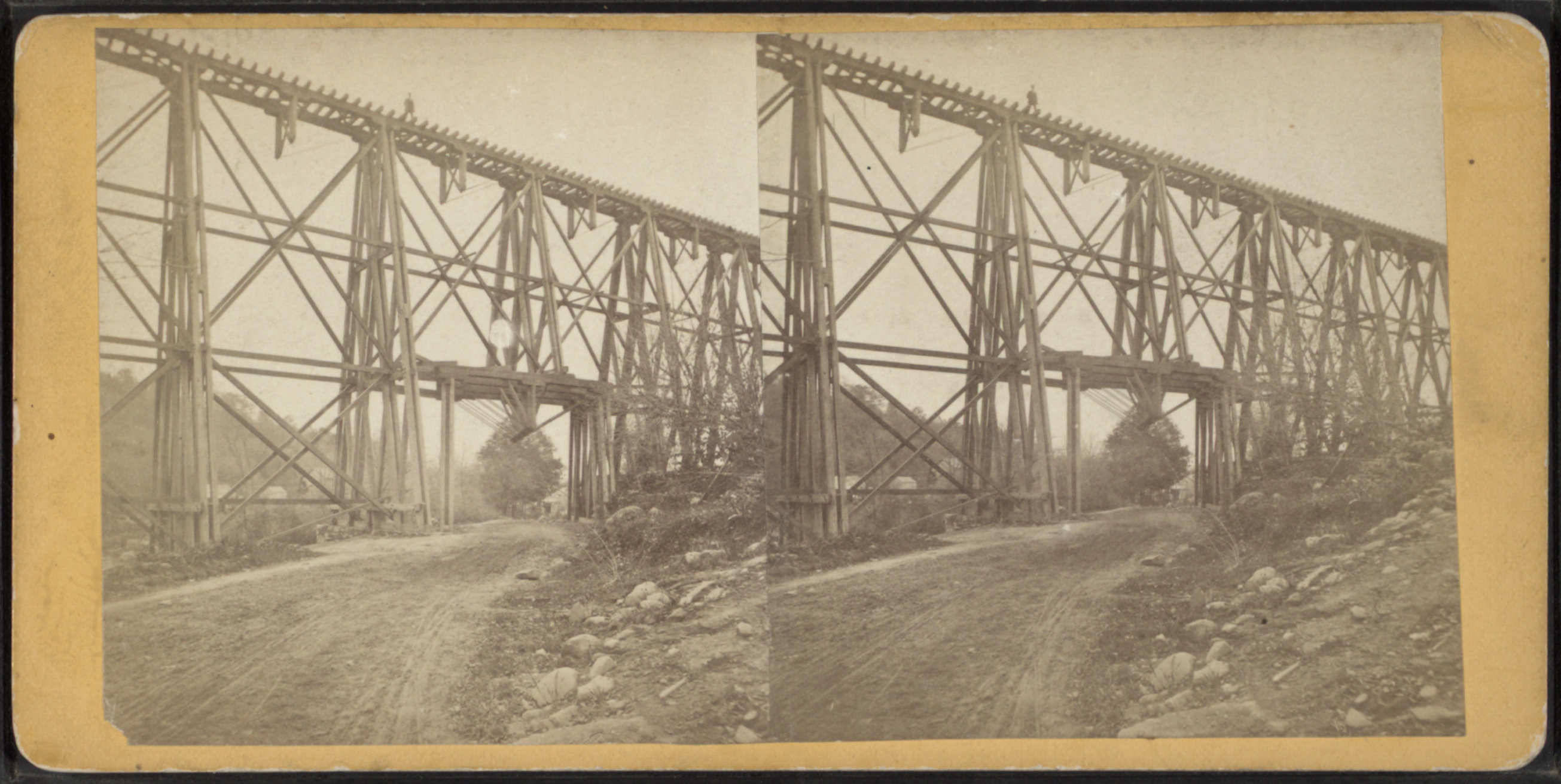
A stereoscopic view of the trestle at Eastview

The Eastview area consisted entirely of farmland until 1824, when Westchester County purchased 110 acres (45 ha) and built the Westchester County Alms House, a building complex and cemetery for abandoned children and the elderly, poor, and homeless. The almshouse was used by the 715 Military Police Battalion and later became part of Westchester Medical Center. The area became known as Eastview after East View Farm, a 350-acre (140 ha) estate purchased by grocery chain owner James Butler in 1893. John Paulding, a captor of John André in the American Revolutionary War, had previously owned part of Butler's estate.

At one point, Eastview was a small hamlet with approximately 15 frame houses, general stores, and candy shops, a community hall, a Methodist church, a one-room schoolhouse, and surrounding farms that supplied dairy products to Tarrytown. The hamlet was located near the old Tarrytown Lakes Pumping Station and continued east by the current Park-and-Ride lot. John Paulding's grandfather Joseph Paulding had built a small farm in Eastview in 1753. John F. Brown owned a small general store at the center of the hamlet. Brown's Mill, which burned to the ground in the 1920s, was one of the last active grist mills on the Saw Mill River. The Eastview railroad station was close to the almshouse, and also held the community's post office. The railroad station was part of the New York and Putnam Railroad, and close to the station was an eighty-foot (25 m) high trestle (41°5′0″N 73°50′0″W) which served as a railroad bridge. In 1881, the tracks were relocated to eliminate the trestle.

In 1893, John D. Rockefeller began buying land in Pocantico Hills to develop his estate. The railroad, which ran through his property, created noise. As well, the sight of Eastview was so irritating in the estate's otherwise undisturbed surroundings, that when Rockefeller's son John Jr. was given the estate in 1928, he negotiated with New York Central (which had acquired the New York and Putnam Railroad) to relocate the railroad to along the Saw Mill River, costing $200,000, which Rockefeller Jr. would pay. In the late 1920s, Rockefeller Jr. hired a Tarrytown real estate agent to quietly buy property in Eastview, and paid well, from $25,000 to $50,000 for property. For $825,000, Rockefeller Jr. had purchased nearly all of the area, and the 46 long-established families moved away. The buildings were set to be razed on May 1, 1929. The railroad would run along what was Eastview's main street. In July 1930, Rockefeller Jr. donated $115,000 of Eastview land to the Westchester County Park Commission to facilitate construction of the Saw Mill River Parkway. In 1935, the cemetery in Eastview was buried with 20 feet of dirt for the Saw Mill River Parkway to run over the plot.

Soon after the end of World War II, Butler's Eastview estate was considered as a site for the United Nations headquarters, and was bought by Union Carbide in the early 1960s, which then sold to the property to Landmark at Eastview, which still owns it. Con Edison now stands where the county almshouse once stood.
