= New York State Route 100 =

State highway in Westchester New York, US

New York State Route 100
- Map of Southeastern New York with NY 100 highlighted in red

Route information
- Maintained by NYSDOT and Westchester County
- Length: 33.27 mi (53.54 km)
- Existed: 1930–present

Major junctions
- South end: I-87 / New York Thruway / Cross County Parkway in Yonkers
- Sprain Brook Parkway in Yonkers and Hawthorne; NY 119 / Bronx River Parkway in White Plains; I-287 in White Plains; NY 9A / NY 141 / Saw Mill River Parkway in Hawthorne; Taconic State Parkway in Mount Pleasant; NY 9A in Briarcliff Manor; NY 133 / Taconic State Parkway in Millwood; NY 35 in Somers
- North end: US 202 in Somers

Location
- Country: United States
- State: New York
- Counties: Westchester

Highway system
- New York Highways; Interstate; US; State; Reference; Parkways
← NY 99	→ NY 100A

New York State Route 100 (NY 100) is a major north–south state highway in Westchester County, New York, in the United States. It begins parallel to Interstate 87 (I-87) at a junction with the Cross County Parkway in the city of Yonkers and runs through most of the length of the county up to U.S. Route 202 (US 202) in the town of Somers. NY 100 was designated as part of the 1930 renumbering of state highways in New York. Prior to becoming a state road, various sections of NY 100 were part of several important early roads in the county.

== Route description ==
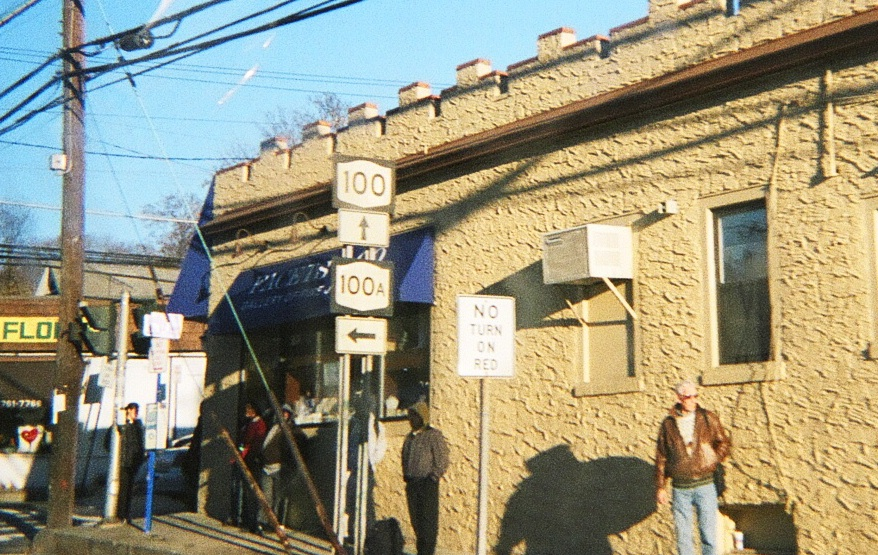
100A and 100 intersection in Hartsdale

NY 100 begins in the city of Yonkers as Central Park Avenue (almost always just called "Central Avenue") at exit 4 of the New York State Thruway (I-87). This portion of Central Avenue is maintained by Westchester County as County Route 47II (CR 47II), an unsigned reference route. Central Avenue continues south as a service road for I-87 until The Bronx, where it splits from I-87 shortly after entering the city, and becomes Jerome Avenue, a major surface road in the West Bronx. NY 100 diverges from I-87 just north of exit 5 and heads northeast, crossing over the Sprain Brook Parkway about 0.6-mile (1.0 km) beyond the split. Central Avenue has an interchange with Tuckahoe Road shortly after the Sprain Brook Parkway. The road continues through Yonkers in the area between the Grassy Sprain Reservoir and the Bronx River, with many retail establishments lining both sides. At the northernmost part of the city, Central Avenue intersects Fort Hill Road, which leads to Jackson Avenue and the northbound Sprain Brook Parkway. Central Avenue continues out of the city of Yonkers into the Edgemont/Greenville section of the town of Greenburgh. The only noteworthy intersection in this area is with Ardsley Road, an east-west road that goes straight across most of south-central Westchester. NY 100 runs through the hamlet of Hartsdale, about two miles (3 km) north of the city line, and where the bypass route NY 100A (Hartsdale Avenue) begins. Hartsdale Avenue also continues east of the intersection into the village of Hartsdale without a route designation. Central Avenue then enters the city limits of White Plains, where the road ends at NY 119 (Tarrytown Road). Within White Plains, the road is county-maintained with unsigned designations of CR 99 and CR 90.

NY 100 north follows NY 119 west for a 0.5-mile (0.8 km) overlap through the western reaches of White Plains. Access to I-287 (the Cross Westchester Expressway) and the Bronx River Parkway can be made in the vicinity of the 100/119 overlap. NY 100 then splits off to the north using Hillside Avenue and Grasslands Road as it goes around the perimeter of Westchester Community College. At a four-way intersection between Grasslands Road, Knollwood Road, and Bradhurst Avenue, NY 100 meets with the north end of NY 100A (Knollwood Road) and the east end of NY 100C. NY 100 makes a right-hand turn to follow Bradhurst Avenue north from the junction while Grasslands Road continues west as NY 100C. Bradhurst Avenue leads into the hamlet of Hawthorne within the town of Mount Pleasant, crossing over the Sprain Brook Parkway along the way. NY 100 subsequently shifts onto Saw Mill River Road (NY 9A), after using a brief section of NY 141 (Broadway). From this junction, the roadway (carrying 9A and 100) is a four-lane expressway as it continues north alongside the Taconic State Parkway. It has an interchange with NY 117 (Bedford Road) about 1.1 miles (1.8 km) north of the 9A/100 merge, with all exits and entrances on the left. 9A and 100 then enter the eastern edge of the village of Briarcliff Manor.

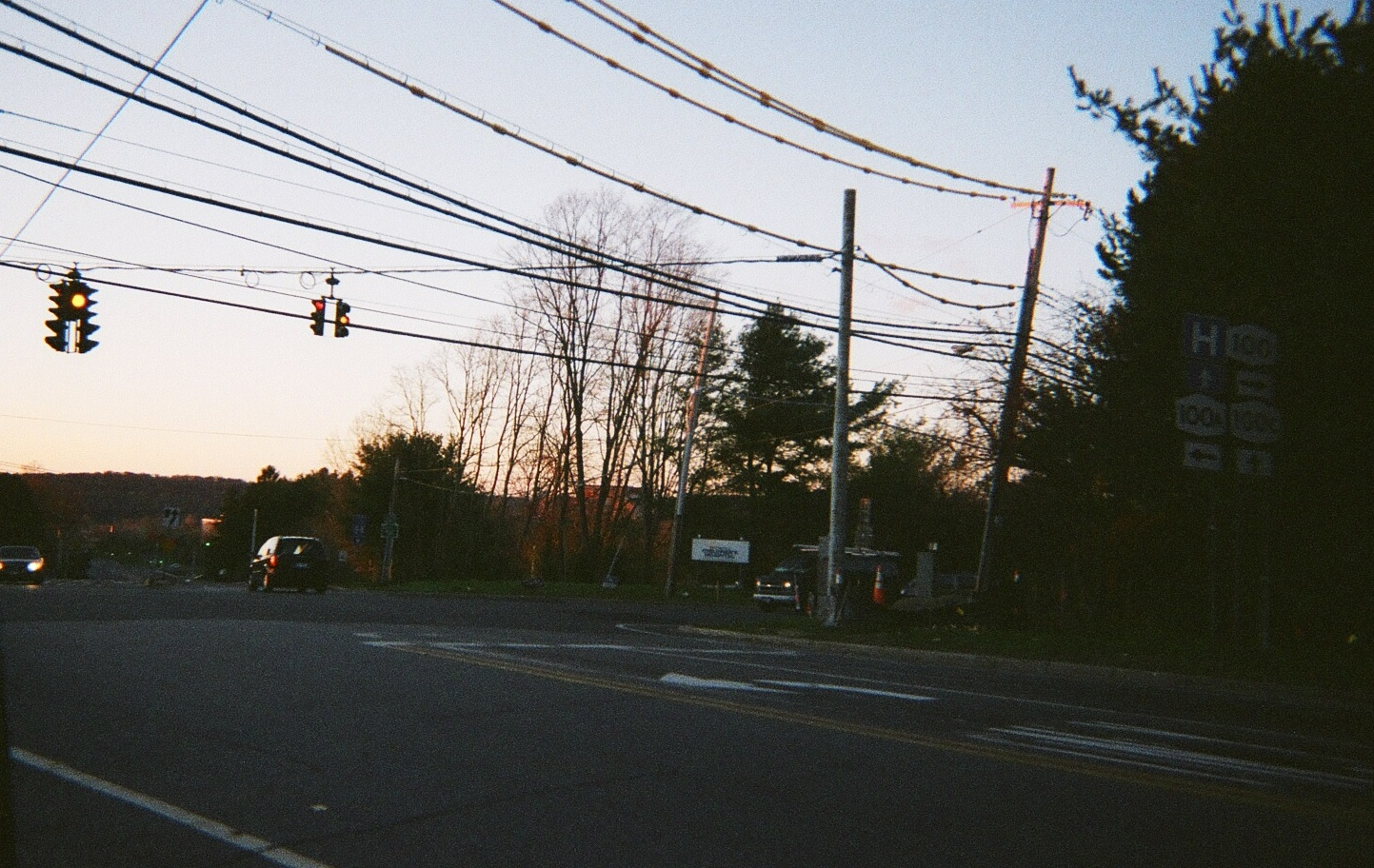
NY 100, NY 100A, and NY 100C near the Sprain Brook Parkway

NY 100 then branches off on its own again in Briarcliff Manor, with NY 9A continuing north as the Briarcliff–Peekskill Parkway and NY 100 continuing northeast on Saw Mill River Road, now a two-lane expressway, which roughly follows New York Central's old Putnam Division railroad. Many of the railroad's old stations can still be found along the highway. NY 100 passes through New Castle before meeting NY 133 and the Taconic State Parkway in the hamlet of Millwood, where it becomes a two-lane surface road. NY 100 continues into the town of Yorktown, passing by the hamlet of Kitchawan. NY 100 then crosses the Croton Reservoir on Pines Bridge. After crossing the reservoir, NY 118 splits off to the west on Saw Mill River Road, while NY 100 continues northeast, now called Somerstown Turnpike.

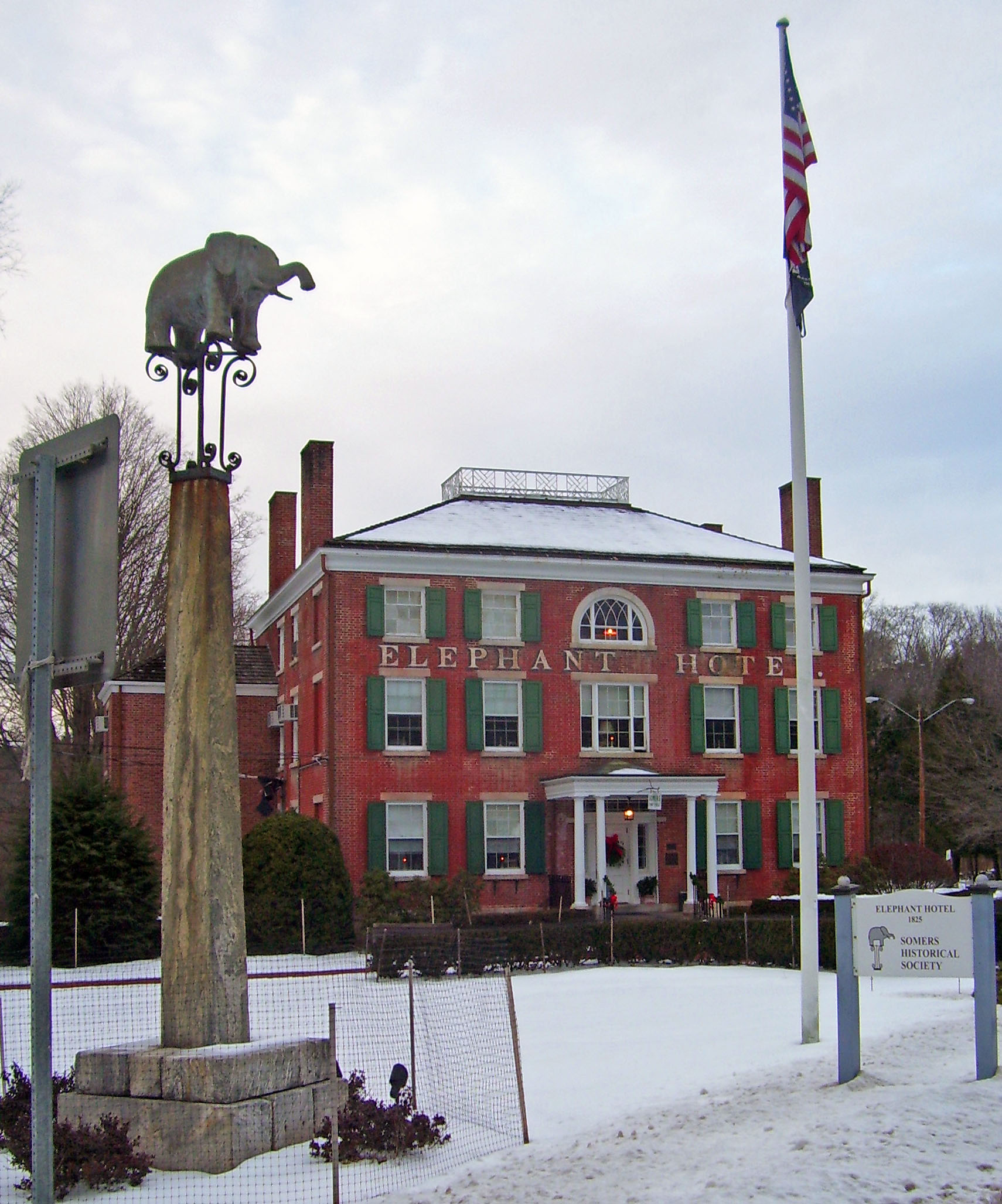
The Elephant Hotel, at Route 100's northern terminus in Somers.

Somerstown Turnpike continues into the town of Somers, passing by some of the last remaining rural areas in Westchester County, including Muscoot Farm, a county owned early-1900s interpretive farm. North of the farm NY 100 intersects with NY 35 in the hamlet of Whitehall Corners, site of a PepsiCo complex. In its northern extremes, NY 100 roughly parallels the Croton Reservoir on the north side before meeting up with US 202 in the hamlet of Somers, where it ends opposite the Elephant Hotel.

== History ==
=== Early roads ===
The southernmost section of NY 100, known as "Central Avenue", appeared in maps by 1888. It was constructed as a plank road in 1874 connecting Macombs Dam Bridge (then known as Central Bridge) to Westchester County. The road continues south into the Bronx as Jerome Avenue, which was originally also called Central Avenue.

NY-100 uses Saw Mill River Road from Hawthorne until it splits from NY 100 in the Town of Yorktown to follow NY 118. The Saw Mill River Road is an early colonial road connecting many different hamlets and villages in Westchester County. It follows along the path of various rivers and brooks, the most notable of which being the road's namesake, the Saw Mill River, as it winds its way to the north of the county. The road is now used as parts of several state routes, including NY 9A, NY 100, and NY 118. The segment used by NY 100 mostly follows the Pocantico River.

The northernmost section of NY 100 runs along a part of the "Croton Turnpike", an early private toll road that was chartered in 1807. The Croton Turnpike connects the village of Ossining (then called Sing Sing) to the hamlet of Somers via Kitchawan. The road was made free in 1849. The Saw Mill River Road was rerouted to overlap the Croton Turnpike as it navigates around and across the Croton Reservoir, which was constructed between 1837 and 1842.

In 1908, the New York State Legislature created Route 2, an unsigned legislative route extending from the New York City line at Yonkers to the Columbia County village of Valatie. Route 2 followed Central Avenue (now NY 100) north through Yonkers to Hartsdale, where it veered west to bypass White Plains on modern NY 100A, NY 100B, and NY 119. It rejoined what is now NY 100 at the junction of Tarrytown Road (NY 119) and Hillside Avenue and followed it north along Hillside Avenue and Grasslands Road to the modern junction of NY 100, NY 100A, and NY 100C, at which point Route 2 continued west toward the Hudson River on current NY 100C.

=== Designation ===
NY 100 was first designated in the 1930 renumbering of state highways in New York, when many of the state roads in Westchester County were first publicly posted with route numbers. Originally, it went north from the Croton Reservoir to US 6 (now NY 6N) in Mahopac Falls on what is now NY 118, Baldwin Place Road, and Myrtle Avenue. Also assigned at this time was NY 118, which began adjacent to the Croton Reservoir at NY 100 and proceeded northeast along the Croton Turnpike to NY 22 in Croton Falls via modern NY 100 and US 202. The alignments of NY 100 and NY 118 north of the Croton Reservoir were swapped c. 1939, placing NY 118 on the more westerly alignment and NY 100 on the Croton Turnpike between the reservoir and Croton Falls.

In December 1934, at the insistence of the Automobile Club of New York, several numbered routes were extended and signed within New York City, with NY 100 being one of these routes. NY 100 was extended south from the Yonkers line in the Bronx along Jerome Avenue to the Grand Concourse. NY 100 crossed into Manhattan via East 149th Street and the 145th Street Bridge. In Manhattan, NY 100 continued south along Lenox Avenue, 110th Street, Fifth Avenue, 96th Street, and Park Avenue, ending at Houston Street (NY 1A). South of Fordham Road, NY 100 was overlapped with NY 22 all the way to Houston Street. The NY 100 designation was removed from New York City following the opening of the Major Deegan Expressway in 1956.

In 1934, US 202 was designated and overlapped with NY 118 (later NY 100) from Somers to Croton Falls. The overlap between NY 100 and US 202 lasted as late as 1990. NY 100 was cut back to end at US 202 in Somers by 2004. The south end of NY 100 had been at the New York City line since 1956; however, as of 2007, NYSDOT recognizes the Cross County Parkway underpass as the official southern terminus of NY 100.

=== Expressway plans ===
In April 1956, the Westchester County Planning Commission recommended that a new expressway should be built along the current NY 100 north of White Plains. The road was to be an extension of the Central Corridor Expressway, which was proposed as NY 125. This 21-mile (34 km) extension was stretch to Putnam County. The area was a high-priority corridor, stretching from the Cross Westchester Expressway (I-287) to the proposed Northern Westchester Expressway (NY 35). North of NY 35, the area was a medium-priority corridor, ending at US 6 in Mahopac. This plan never materialized and Interstate 684 along the NY 22 corridor was built instead.

== Suffixed routes ==
- NY 100A (4.21 miles or 6.78 kilometres) is a bypass route of NY 100 that lets motorists avoid the frequently congested stretch of NY-100 in White Plains. NY 100A connects to Interstate 287 and goes near the NY 100B entrance to the Sprain Brook Parkway. It was assigned as part of the 1930 renumbering of state highways in New York.
- NY 100B (2.88 miles or 4.63 kilometres) is a spur off NY 119. Although the route does not intersect NY 100, it meets NY 100A and terminates at NY 119 roughly 200 yards (180 m) from where NY 119 meets NY 100 and I-287. It connects to the Sprain Brook Parkway. The route was assigned in the late 1930s.
- NY 100C (1.24 miles or 2.00 kilometres) is a spur off NY 100 in Eastview. It connects to the Saw Mill Parkway at its western terminus and the Sprain Brook Parkway near its intersection with NY 100 and NY 100A. It was assigned in the late 1930s.

== Major intersections ==
The entire route is in Westchester County.

Location	mi	km	Destinations	Notes
Yonkers	0.00	0.00	Central Park Avenue	Continuation south
Yonkers	0.00	0.00	Cross County Parkway to Bronx River Parkway	Exit 4N on Cross County Parkway
Yonkers	0.10	0.16	I-87 south (New York Thruway) – New York City	Southbound exit and northbound entrance; exit 5 on I-87 / Thruway
Yonkers	0.10	0.16	Midland Avenue	Interchange
Yonkers	0.20	0.32	I-87 north / New York Thruway north – Tappan Zee Bridge, Albany	Northbound exit and southbound entrance; exit 4 on I-87 / Thruway
Yonkers	1.00– 1.11	1.61– 1.79	Palmer Road	Interchange
Yonkers	1.00– 1.11	1.61– 1.79	Sprain Brook Parkway	Interchange; no northbound access to Sprain Brook Parkway south
Yonkers	1.72	2.77	Tuckahoe Road	Interchange
Town of Greenburgh	4.72	7.60	Ardsley Road – Ardsley, Scarsdale, Scarsdale Station	Hamlet of Edgemont (Greenville)
Town of Greenburgh	6.89	11.09	NY 100A north – Hartsdale, Scarsdale, Hartsdale Station	Southern terminus of NY 100A; hamlet of Hartsdale
White Plains	8.61	13.86	NY 119 east / Bronx River Parkway – White Plains, Scarsdale, Valhalla, White Plains Station	Access to Bronx Parkway via Central Avenue; southern end of NY 100 concurrency; exit 22 on Bronx Parkway
White Plains			I-287	Northbound exit and southbound entrance; exit 5 on I-287; former I-487
White Plains	9.10	14.65	NY 119 west – Elmsford	Northern end of NY 119 concurrency
Greenburgh–Mount Pleasant town line	12.26	19.73	NY 100A south / NY 100C west to Sprain Brook Parkway	Northern terminus of NY 100A; eastern terminus of NY 100C
Town of Mount Pleasant	13.60	21.89	Sprain Brook Parkway south – New York City	Access via Hospital Road
Town of Mount Pleasant			Sprain Brook Parkway to Taconic State Parkway north / Saw Mill River Parkway north – New York City, Albany	Interchange
Town of Mount Pleasant	14.73	23.71	To NY 141 north	No southbound exit; access via Bradhurst Avenue
Town of Mount Pleasant	14.85	23.90	NY 141 north to Taconic State Parkway south – Hawthorne	Southern end of NY 141 concurrency; southbound exit and northbound entrance; hamlet of Hawthorne
Town of Mount Pleasant	15.02	24.17	Southern end of limited-access section	
Town of Mount Pleasant	15.02	24.17	NY 9A south – Elmsford NY 141 ends	Southern end of NY 9A concurrency; northern terminus of NY 141
Town of Mount Pleasant	15.12	24.33	Saw Mill River Parkway south – New York City, Yonkers	Southbound exit only
Town of Mount Pleasant	16.15	25.99	NY 117 – Sleepy Hollow, Pleasantville	Left exit and entrance
Town of Mount Pleasant	16.85	27.12	Taconic State Parkway south – New York City	Southbound exit and northbound entrance; exit 5 on Taconic State Parkway
Briarcliff Manor	17.85	28.73	Pleasantville Road east	Northbound exit and entrance
Briarcliff Manor	17.85	28.73	Pleasantville Road west	Southbound exit and entrance
Briarcliff Manor	18.13	29.18	NY 9A north – Peekskill, Bear Mountain Bridge	Northern end of NY 9A concurrency; former routing of NY 100
Town of New Castle	20.71	33.33	Northern end of limited-access section	
Town of New Castle	20.71– 20.85	33.33– 33.55	NY 133 west / Taconic State Parkway – Ossining, New York City, Albany	Southern end of NY 133 concurrency; exit 8 on Taconic State Parkway
Town of New Castle	21.10	33.96	NY 133 east – Chappaqua, Mount Kisco	Northern end of NY 133 concurrency
Town of New Castle	21.56	34.70	NY 120 south – Chappaqua, Mount Kisco	Northern terminus of NY 120; hamlet of Millwood
Town of Yorktown	23.23	37.39	NY 134 west – Ossining	Eastern terminus of NY 134
Croton Reservoir			Pines Bridge	
Town of Yorktown	24.94	40.14	NY 118 north – Yorktown Heights	Southern terminus of NY 118; former NY 129
Town of Somers	29.30	47.15	NY 35 – Yorktown Heights, Katonah, Katonah Station	Hamlet of Whitehall Corners
Town of Somers	29.88	48.09	NY 139 north – Lincolndale	Southern terminus of NY 139
Town of Somers	32.35	52.06	NY 138 east – Goldens Bridge, Goldens Bridge Station	Western terminus of NY 138
Town of Somers	33.27	53.54	US 202 – Brewster, Yorktown, Purdy’s Station	Northern terminus; hamlet of Somers
1.000 mi = 1.609 km; 1.000 km = 0.621 mi: Concurrency terminus; Incomplete access

== See also ==
- List of county routes in Westchester County, New York
