= New York State Route 100A =

State highway in Westchester New York, US

New York State Route 100A
- Map of Westchester County in southeastern New York with NY 100A highlighted in red

Route information
- Auxiliary route of NY 100
- Maintained by NYSDOT
- Length: 4.21 mi (6.78 km)
- Existed: 1930–present

Major junctions
- South end: NY 100 in Hartsdale
- I-287 in Elmsford
- North end: NY 100 / NY 100C at the Greenburgh–Mount Pleasant line

Location
- Country: United States
- State: New York
- Counties: Westchester

Highway system
- New York Highways; Interstate; US; State; Reference; Parkways
← NY 100	→ NY 100B

New York State Route 100A (NY 100A) is a 4.21-mile (6.78 km) loop route of NY 100 in Westchester County, New York, in the United States. It follows West Hartsdale Avenue and Knollwood Road in the town of Greenburgh. The route starts in the hamlet of Hartsdale and ends in the community of Grasslands at the boundary between the towns of Greenburgh and Mount Pleasant.

== Route description ==
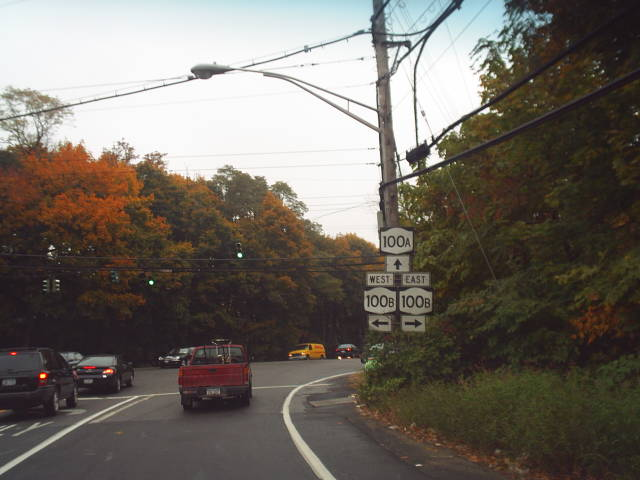
NY 100A at the junction with NY 100B in Greenburgh

NY 100A begins at an intersection with NY 100 (Central Park Avenue) in the town of Greenburgh, a short distance north of Hartsdale. NY 100A winds northwest through the hills of Greenburgh as West Hartsdale Avenue, passing multiple residences on its way up. Just after Woods End Lane, the route turns northward through Greenburgh, passing Ridge Road County Park and the Metropolis Country Club before reaching a junction with NY 100B (Dobbs Ferry Road). At this junction, NY 100A changes monikers to Knollwood Road, winding northward through Greenburgh into a junction with NY 119 as it crosses into the village of Elmsford.

After NY 119, NY 100A passes Yosemite Park and enters exit 4 off the Cross Westchester Expressway (I-287). NY 100A continues northeast through Elmsford, running along the southeastern edge of the Knollwood Country Club and passing an entrance to Westchester Community College. After passing the entrance, the route winds northward through Greenburgh, passing multiple residences before reaching a junction with NY 100 (Grasslands Road) and NY 100C (Grasslands Road) just east of the Sprain Brook Parkway. This junction marks the northern terminus of NY 100A and the eastern terminus of NY 100C, with NY 100 turning north onto Bradhurst Avenue, the continuation of Knollwood Road. Several blocks away from this junction is the Kensico Cemetery.

== History ==
NY 100A was designated in the 1930 state highway renumbering and has not had any major changes since.

== Major intersections ==
The entire route is in Westchester County.

Location	mi	km	Destinations	Notes
Hartsdale	0.00	0.00	NY 100 (Central Park Avenue)	Southern terminus
Greenburgh	1.52	2.45	NY 100B (Dobbs Ferry Road)	
Elmsford	2.21	3.56	NY 119 – Elmsford	Interchange
Elmsford	2.33	3.75	I-287	Exit 4 on I-287; former I-487
Greenburgh–Mount Pleasant line	4.21	6.78	NY 100 / NY 100C west to Sprain Brook Parkway	Northern terminus; eastern terminus of NY 100C
1.000 mi = 1.609 km; 1.000 km = 0.621 mi
