= New York State Route 100C =

State highway in Westchester New York, US

New York State Route 100C
- Map of Westchester County in southeastern New York with NY 100C highlighted in red

Route information
- Auxiliary route of NY 100
- Maintained by NYSDOT
- Length: 1.24 mi (2.00 km)
- Existed: late 1930s–present

Major junctions
- West end: NY 9A in Greenburgh
- NY 9A at the Greenburgh–Mount Pleasant line Sprain Brook Parkway at the Greenburgh–Mount Pleasant line
- East end: NY 100 / NY 100A at the Greenburgh–Mount Pleasant line

Location
- Country: United States
- State: New York
- Counties: Westchester

Highway system
- New York Highways; Interstate; US; State; Reference; Parkways
← NY 100B	→ NY 101

New York State Route 100C (NY 100C) is an east–west spur route of NY 100 located in Westchester County, New York, in the United States. The road is entirely within the town of Greenburgh, running for 1.24 miles (2.00 km) from an intersection with NY 9A (Saw Mill River Road) to a junction with NY 100 and NY 100A just east of the Sprain Brook Parkway. The eastern terminus of NY 100C also serves as NY 100A's northern endpoint.

== Route description ==
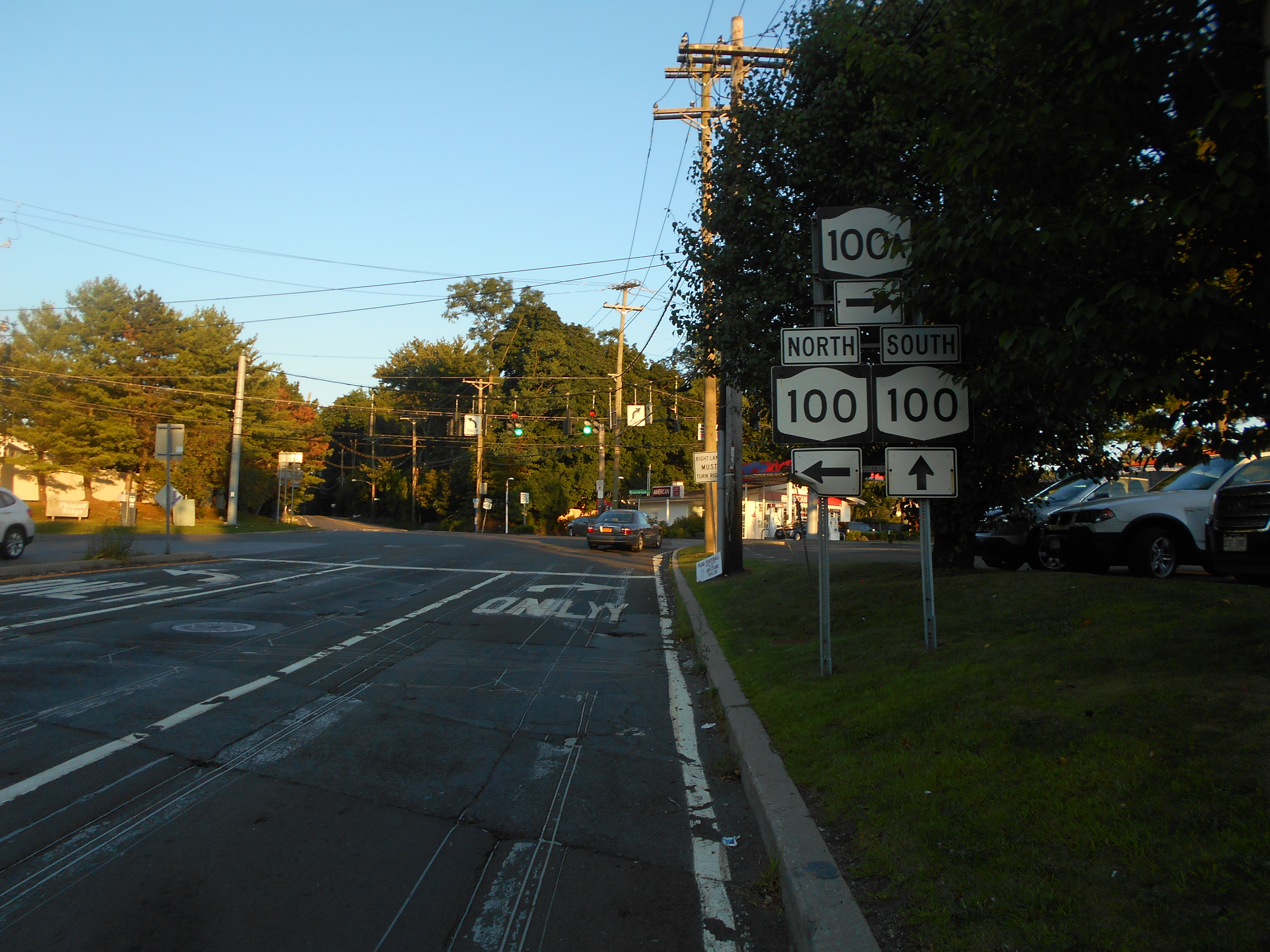
NY 100C at the junction with NY 100 and NY 100A in Greenburgh

NY 100C begins as Old Saw Mill River Road at an at-grade intersection with NY 9A (Saw Mill River Road) in the town of Greenburgh. After Old Saw Mill River Road leaves it at a roundabout, the route heads east as Grasslands Road and crosses over NY 9A, where it has a northbound entrance ramp. Continuing east, NY 100C enters a grade-separated interchange with the Sprain Brook Parkway. A short distance from the interchange, NY 100C intersects with NY 100 (Bradhurst Avenue) and NY 100A (Knollwood Road). This intersection serves as the eastern terminus of NY 100C, as Grasslands Road continues east as NY 100.

== History ==
All of what is now NY 100C was originally designated as part of NY 142 c. 1931. At the time, NY 142 overlapped with NY 9A along Old Saw Mill River Road (modern CR 303) to the east end of Neperan Road, where it broke from NY 9A and proceeded toward Hawthorne on then-Saw Mill River Road. The NY 142 designation was short-lived, however, as it was eliminated around c. 1938. By 1940, the portion of NY 142's former routing northeast of the NY 9A overlap was replaced by an extended NY 141 while the section east of the concurrency on Grasslands Road was redesignated as NY 100C. In the late 1940s, NY 9A was extended northward through Hawthorne to Ossining by way of a realigned Saw Mill River Road. The portion of Old Saw Mill River Road between Grasslands Road and the new highway became a short extension of NY 100C.

== Major intersections ==
The entire route is in Westchester County.

Location	mi	km	Destinations	Notes
Greenburgh	0.00	0.00	NY 9A – Elmsford, Hawthorne	Western terminus
Greenburgh–Mount Pleasant line	0.20	0.32	Old Saw Mill River Road – Eastview	Roundabout
Greenburgh–Mount Pleasant line	0.20	0.32	NY 9A north – Hawthorne	Interchange
Greenburgh–Mount Pleasant line	1.10	1.77	Sprain Brook Parkway – New York City, Albany	Interchange
Greenburgh–Mount Pleasant line	1.24	2.00	NY 100 / NY 100A south – White Plains, Hawthorne	Eastern terminus; northern terminus of NY 100A
1.000 mi = 1.609 km; 1.000 km = 0.621 mi
