= Lillie Rubin =

Women's clothing shop chain

- Industry: Retail
- Founded: 1946
- Founder: Lillie Rubin
- Defunct: 1999
- Fate: Acquired by The Forgotten Woman and then liquidated with the company
- Headquarters: Miami Beach, Florida, United States
- Number of locations: 1 (1946); 2 (1955); 50 (1984); 79 (1994); 59 (1996, pre-bankruptcy); 38 (1996, post-bankruptcy); 25 (1998)
- Products: Women's dresses, sportswear, and suits

Lillie Rubin was an American chain of women's clothing shops in the United States, that operated from 1946 until 1999.

== History ==
Lillie Rubin began in 1946 with a single store in Miami Beach, Florida at 1037 Lincoln Road, where an Apple Store resides today. A second store opened in Palm Beach, Florida on December 15, 1955.

Founder and namesake Lillie Rubin died at age 90 in 1984, at which point her chain had grown to 50 stores. The chain was the target of a potential lawsuit from the Equal Employment Opportunity Commission in 1995, following a complaint filed in Phoenix, Arizona the year before, after a male applicant was denied a job due to his gender. The case was, however, quietly dropped by 1996. The chain filed for Chapter 11 Bankruptcy in 1996, then shrunk to 59 stores from a 1994 peak of 79. The assets of the company were bought by Elmsford, New York based investor Asher Fensterheim for $7 million, and were formed into a new company, Lillie Rubin Fashions, which was to operate 38 stores.

The company filed for Chapter 11 bankruptcy a second time in February 1998, with the 25 stores being sold to The Forgotten Woman, a New York City based chain of 9 plus-size woman's clothing stores. While the chain intended to continue operating the majority of stores under the Lillie Rubin name, The Forgotten Woman filed for bankruptcy the following year, closing all 30 stores in 1999.
