= New York State Route 100B =

State highway in Westchester New York, US

New York State Route 100B
- Dobbs Ferry Road
- Map of Westchester County in southeastern New York with NY 100B highlighted in red

Route information
- Auxiliary route of NY 100
- Maintained by NYSDOT
- Length: 2.88 mi (4.63 km)
- Existed: late 1930s–present

Major junctions
- West end: NY 9A in Greenburgh
- Sprain Brook Parkway in Greenburgh
- East end: NY 119 in Fairview

Location
- Country: United States
- State: New York
- Counties: Westchester

Highway system
- New York Highways; Interstate; US; State; Reference; Parkways
| ← NY 100A | → NY 100C |

New York State Route 100B (NY 100B) is a 2.88-mile (4.63 km) spur route of NY 100 in Westchester County, New York, in the United States. The route follows Dobbs Ferry Road across the southern part of the town of Greenburgh, connecting NY 9A to NY 119. It does not directly connect to NY 100; however, it intersects NY 100A about 1 mile (1.6 km) west of NY 119, and its eastern terminus on NY 119 is roughly 660 feet (201.2 m) west of NY 100. NY 100B was assigned in the late 1930s.

== Route description ==
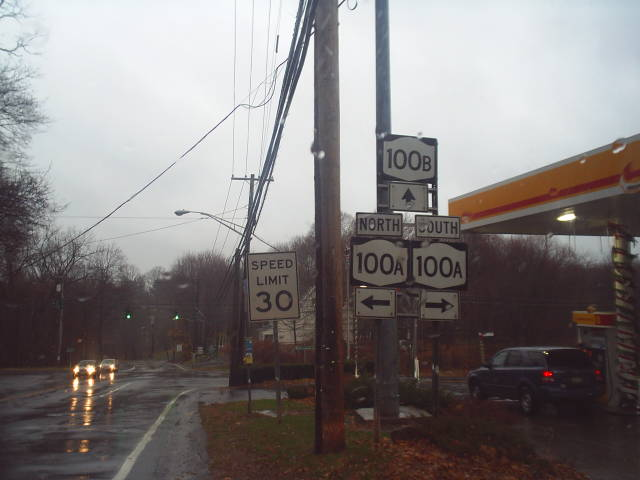
NY 100B east at the junction with NY 100A in Greenburgh

NY 100B begins at an intersection with NY 9A (Saw Mill River Road) in the town of Greenburgh, right next to the New York State Thruway (I-87) just outside of Ardsley. Known as Dobbs Ferry Road, NY 100B proceeds northeast through Greenburgh as a two-lane residential street within the proximity of Ardsley, bending east into a junction with Park Avenue. Crossing east through Greenburgh, the route crosses south of the former Elmwood Country Club.. At the east end of the country club, NY 100B passes underneath two transmission lines and crosses into an interchange with the Sprain Brook Parkway. After the Sprain, the route continues east through Greenburgh, passing more residences and entering an intersection with NY 100A (West Hartsdale Road / Knollwood Road). near the Hartsdale border

After NY 100A, NY 100B turns northeast in front of the Metropolis Country Club, remaining the two-lane residential street through Greenburgh. Passing south of a large strip mall near Fairview, the route crosses into a junction with NY 119 (Tarrytown Road) in the center of Greenburgh. The right-of-way for NY 100B merges into NY 119, marking the eastern terminus of NY 100B.

== History ==
The easternmost mile (1.6 km) of NY 100B was originally part of Route 2, an unsigned legislative route assigned by the New York State Legislature in 1908. The route began at the New York City line in Yonkers and went north through the eastern Hudson Valley to Valatie, where it ended at Route 1. Route 2 continued south from Dobbs Ferry Road on modern NY 100A and north on what is now NY 119. The Dobbs Ferry Road section of Route 2 was improved to state highway standards as part of a contract awarded by the state of New York on June 26, 1912, and added to the state highway system six months later on December 27. Although the portion of Dobbs Ferry Road east of NY 100A was state-maintained, it did not receive a posted route number until the late 1930s when it was designated as part of NY 100B, a new route continuing west of NY 100A to connect to NY 9A (Saw Mill River Road). The alignment of the route has not been changed since that time.

== Major intersections ==
The entire route is in Westchester County.

| Location | mi | km | Destinations | Notes |
|---|---|---|---|---|
| Greenburgh | 0.00 | 0.00 | NY 9A (Saw Mill River Road) – Ardsley, Elmsford | Western terminus |
| Greenburgh | 1.53 | 2.46 | Sprain Brook Parkway | Interchange |
| Greenburgh | 1.94 | 3.12 | NY 100A (Hartsdale Avenue / Knollwood Road) | |
| Fairview | 2.88 | 4.63 | NY 119 (Tarrytown Road) | Eastern terminus |
1.000 mi = 1.609 km; 1.000 km = 0.621 mi
