= Greenburgh, New York =

- Town
- Town of Greenburgh
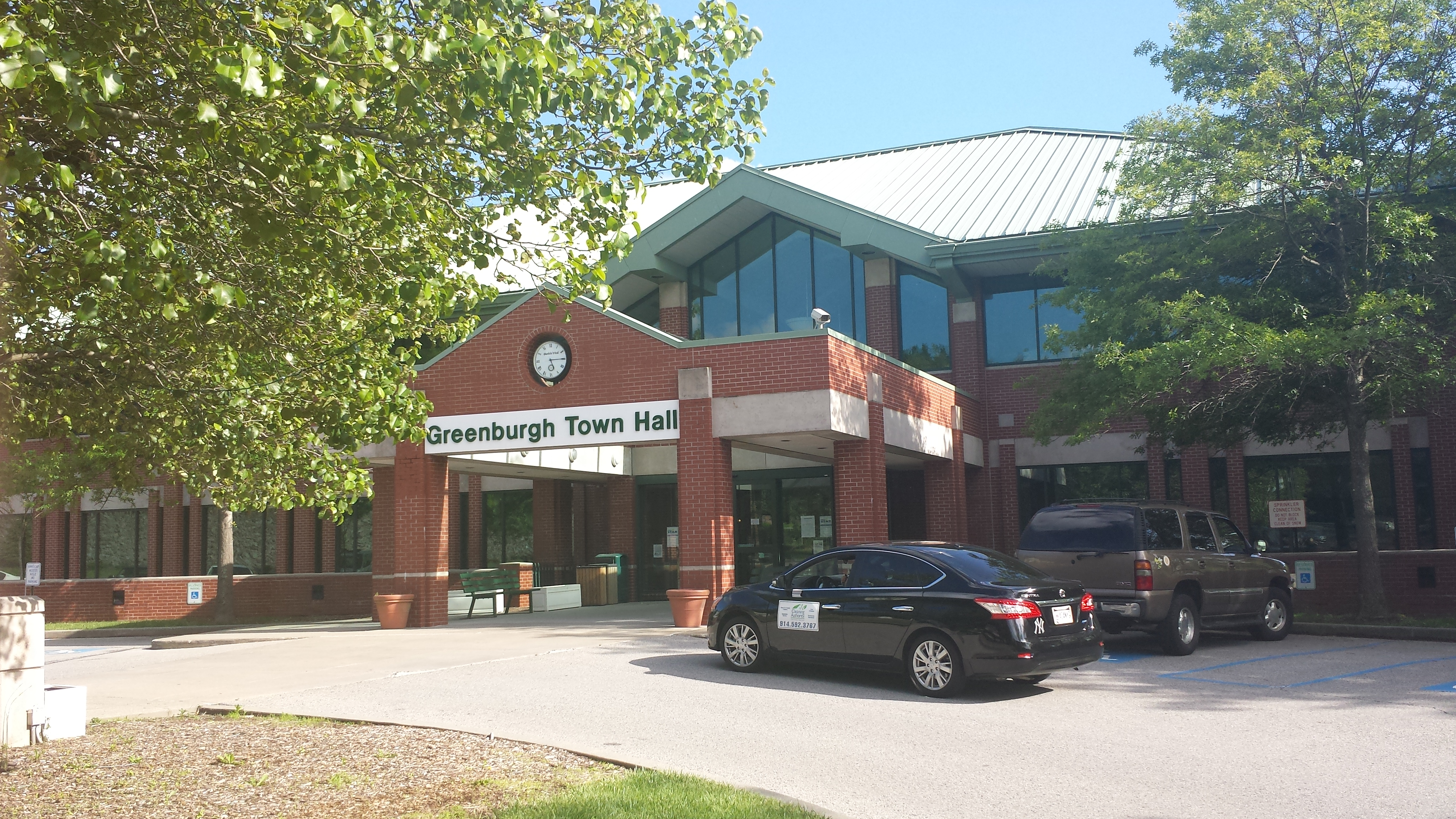
- Greenburgh Town Hall

- Seal

- Location of Greenburgh, New York
- Coordinates: 41°1′55″N 73°49′59″W
- Country: United States
- State: New York
- County: Westchester
- Founded: 1788

Government
  - Type: Civil township
  - Town Supervisor: Paul J. Feiner (D)
  - Town Council: Members: • Ken Jones (D); • Diana Juettner (D); • Kevin Morgan (D); • Francis Sheehan (D)

Area
  - Total: 36.12 sq mi (93.54 km^{2})
  - Land: 30.31 sq mi (78.50 km^{2})
  - Water: 5.80 sq mi (15.03 km^{2})
- Elevation: 171 ft (52 m)

Population (2020)
  - Total: 95,397
  - Density: 3,147.5/sq mi (1,215.25/km^{2})
- Time zone: UTC-5 (Eastern (EST))
  - Summer (DST): UTC-4 (EDT)
- ZIP code: 10603, 10607, 10530, others
- Area code: 914
- FIPS code: 36-30367
- GNIS feature ID: 0979017
- Website: www.greenburghny.com

Greenburgh is a town in western Westchester County, New York. The population was 95,397 at the time of the 2020 census. The town consists of 6 villages and an unincorporated area.

== History ==
Greenburgh developed along the Hudson River, long the main transportation route. It was settled by northern Europeans in its early years, primarily of Dutch and English descent. Residents were active during the American Revolutionary War.

The Romer-Van Tassel House served as the first town hall, from 1793 into the early 19th century. It was added to the National Register of Historic Places in 1994. Other locations on the National Register are the Church of St. Joseph of Arimathea and Odell House. The Spanish American War Monument to the 71st Infantry Regiment in Mount Hope Cemetery was added to the National Register of Historic Places in 2011.

== Geography ==
Greenburgh is bordered by the city of Yonkers on the south, the town of Mount Pleasant to the north, and to the east by the city of White Plains and the town of Scarsdale. The boundary between Greenburgh and Mount Pleasant is the boundary between the adjacent villages of Tarrytown (in Greenburgh) and Sleepy Hollow (in Mount Pleasant), which runs along Andre Brook. Greenburgh's western boundary is the Hudson River. The Tappan Zee Bridge, whose eastern end is in Tarrytown, connects Greenburgh with South Nyack in Rockland County, New York.

According to the United States Census Bureau, the town has a total area of 36.1 square miles (93.5 km^{2}), of which 30.3 square miles (78.5 km^{2}) is land and 5.8 square miles (15.0 km^{2}), or 16.07%, is water.

== Demographics ==
Historical population
Census	Pop.	Note	%±
1790	1,450		—
1820	2,064		—
1830	2,195		6.3%
1840	3,361		53.1%
1850	4,291		27.7%
1860	8,929		108.1%
1870	10,790		20.8%
1880	8,934		−17.2%
1890	11,613		30.0%
1900	15,564		34.0%
1910	21,148		35.9%
1920	23,881		12.9%
1930	35,821		50.0%
1940	40,145		12.1%
1950	47,527		18.4%
1960	76,213		60.4%
1970	85,827		12.6%
1980	82,881		−3.4%
1990	83,816		1.1%
2000	86,764		3.5%
2010	88,400		1.9%
2020	95,397		7.9%
U.S. Decennial Census

As of the 2000 census, there were 86,764 people, 33,043 households, and 23,097 families residing in the town. The population density was 2,842.7 inhabitants per square mile (1,097.6/km^{2}). There were 34,084 housing units at an average density of 1,116.7 per square mile (431.2/km^{2}). The racial makeup of the town was 72.41% White, 13.07% African American, 0.17% Native American, 8.77% Asian, 0.05% Pacific Islander, 2.94% from other races, and 2.59% from two or more races. Hispanic or Latino of any race were 9.02% of the population.

There were 33,043 households, out of which 32.4% had children under the age of 18 living with them, 57.3% were married couples living together, 9.8% had a female householder with no husband present, and 30.1% were non-families. 25.5% of all households were made up of individuals, and 9.1% had someone living alone who was 65 years of age or older. The average household size was 2.57 and the average family size was 3.10.

In the town, the population was spread out, with 23.7% under the age of 18, 5.9% from 18 to 24, 29.7% from 25 to 44, 26.2% from 45 to 64, and 14.6% who were 65 years of age or older. The median age was 40 years. For every 100 females, there were 90.3 males. For every 100 females age 18 and over, there were 84.5 males.

According to a 2007 estimate, the median income for a household in the town was $100,656, and the median income for a family was $118,360. Males had a median income of $64,186 versus $46,658 for females. The per capita income for the town was $43,778. About 2.0% of families and 3.9% of the population were below the poverty line, including 3.4% of those under age 18 and 4.8% of those age 65 or over.

By 1991, 5% of the community's population was of Asian origins.

== Communities and locations in the Town of Greenburgh ==
Roughly half of Greenburgh's population reside within the town's six incorporated villages. The rest live in the unincorporated area of the town of Greenburgh, outside any villages.

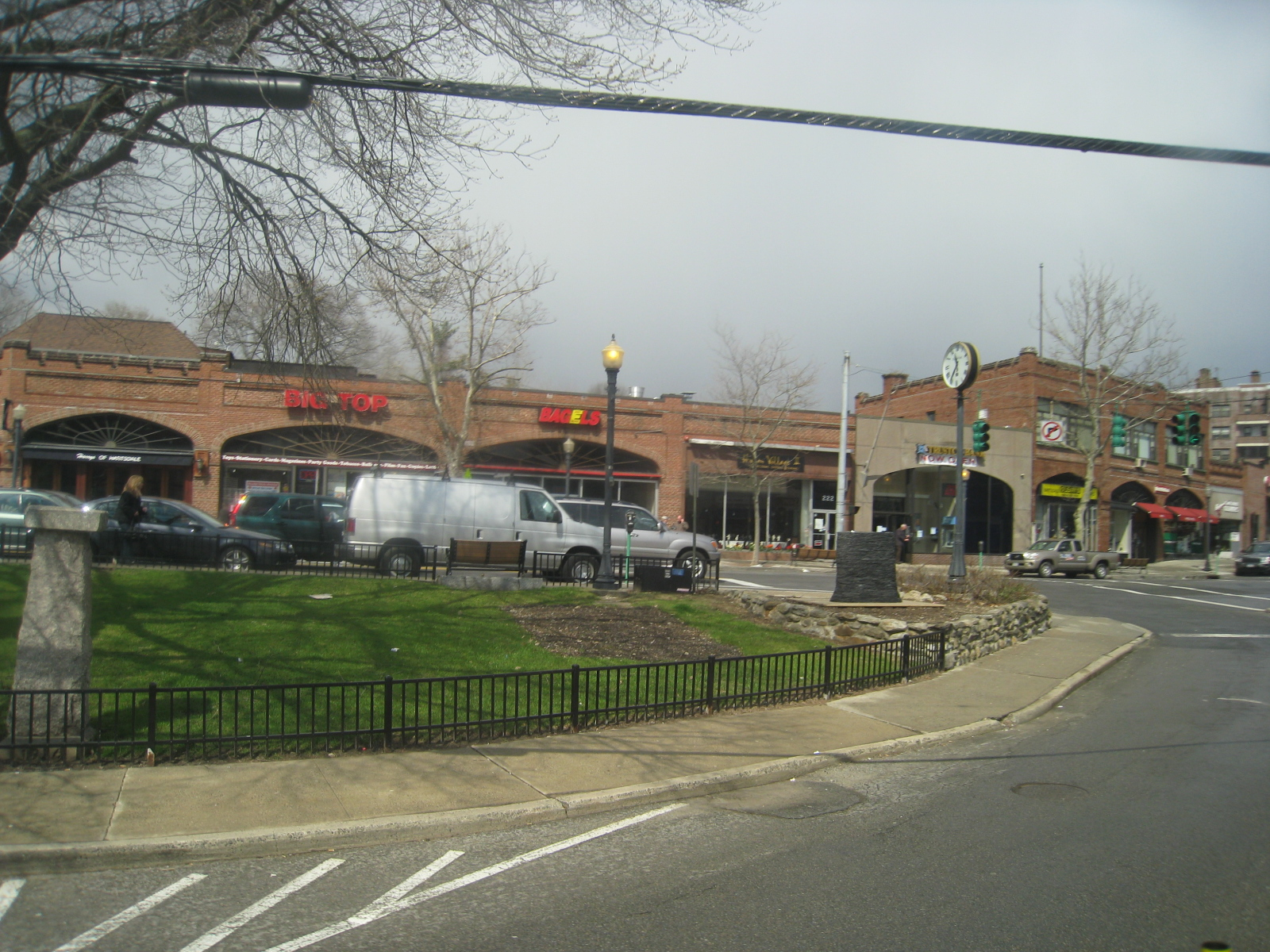
Hartsdale, an unincorporated hamlet in the town of Greenburgh

=== Villages ===
Greenburgh contains six villages:

- Ardsley
- Dobbs Ferry
- Elmsford
- Hastings-on-Hudson
- Irvington
- Tarrytown

=== Unincorporated area ===
The unincorporated area of Greenburgh consists of the formerly rural areas of the town outside the villages. While hamlets are not recognized as municipal entities in New York State, most properties in unincorporated Greenburgh are classified within one of the town's three federally recognized zones, each known as a census-designated place. These generally correspond to a fire district.

- Fairview
- Greenville
- Hartsdale

Other unincorporated areas in Greenburgh outside of the three main CDPs include the neighborhoods of:

- East Irvington^{A}
- North Elmsford
- South Ardsley

== Transportation ==
Interstate 87 (the New York State Thruway), the Cross Westchester Expressway, the Saw Mill River Parkway, the Bronx River Parkway, and the Sprain Brook Parkway all pass through the town. US routes include U.S. Route 9. State routes that traverse the town are Route 9A, Route 100 (as well as A, B and C) and Route 119.

The Metro-North Railroad's Hudson Line passes through the west of the town with stations at Hastings-on-Hudson, Dobbs Ferry, Ardsley-on-Hudson, Irvington and Tarrytown, and its Harlem Line passes through the east of the town with a station at Hartsdale.

Westchester County's Bee-Line Bus System also serves the town, and the HudsonLink Bus Service provides connections across the Governor Mario M. Cuomo Bridge to Rockland County.

== Economy ==
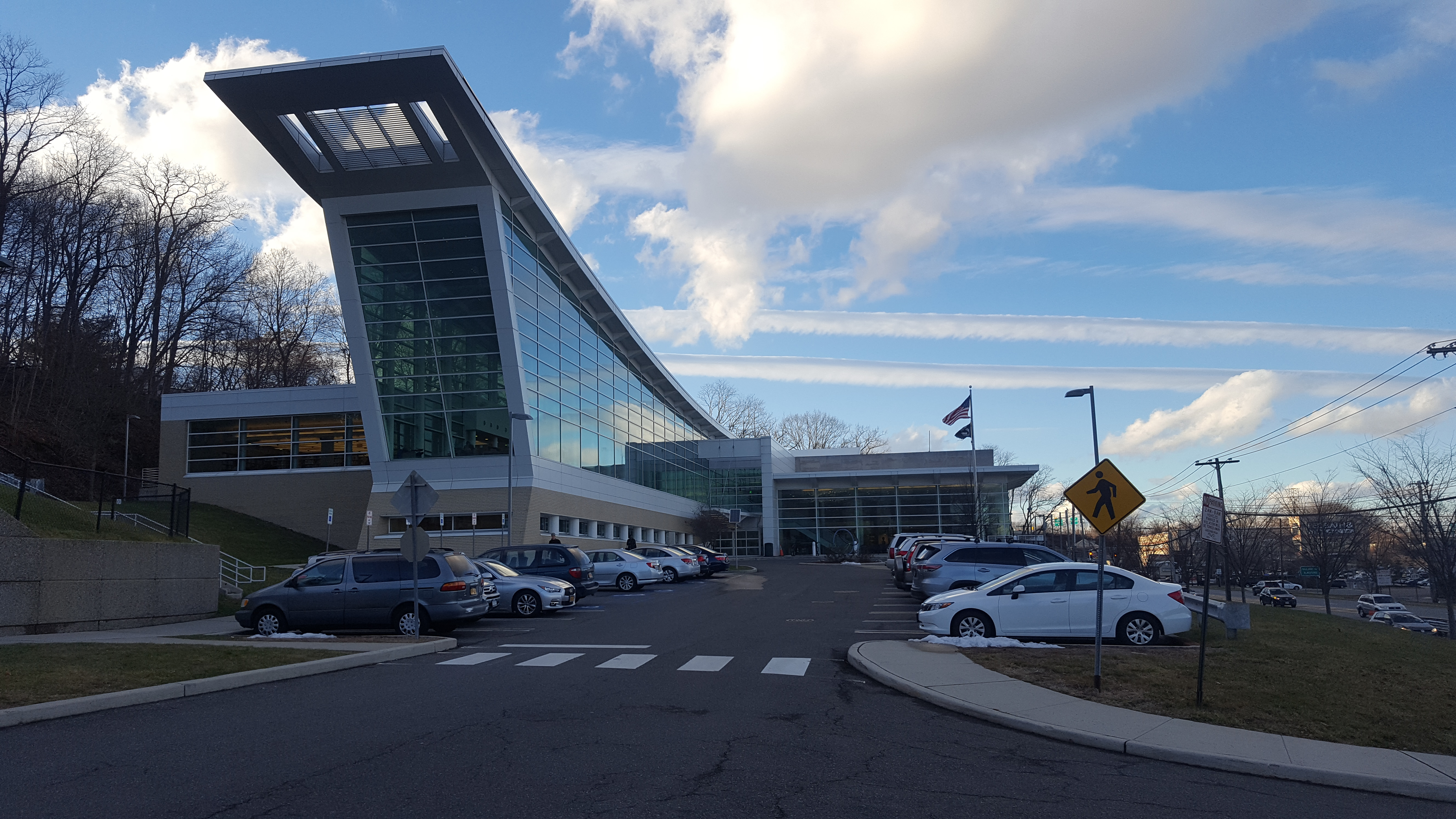
Greenburgh Public Library

The Westchester Library System headquarters are in the town, in Elmsford. As of 2014, The income per capita in Greenburgh is $55,049. The median household income is $100,282.

== Notable people ==
- Freddie Blassie, professional wrestler
- Cab Calloway was born in Rochester NY, jazz musician
- Gordon Parks, photographer
- Moms Mabley, comedian
- Donovan Mitchell, NBA player
- Dana Reeve, actress and wife of Christopher Reeve
- Biff Henderson, television personality
- Adam Clayton Powell Jr., Baptist pastor and politician
- Adam Clayton Powell III, journalist, academic, and media executive
- Hazel Scott, jazz vocalist
- Roy Campanella, professional baseball player

== Notes ==
A.The community of East Irvington is centered on the intersection of East Sunnyside Lane, Taxter Road and Mountain Road at 41.047°N 73.849°W. It consists primarily of unincorporated parts of the town of Greenburgh, but is also commonly considered to include adjoining parts of the villages of Irvington and Tarrytown which branch off from East Sunnyside Lane and Mountain Road. The community has no official status, but is nonetheless recognized in names of Greenburgh facilities such as "East Irvington Park" and the "East Irvington Nature Preserve", as well as in the East Irvington School, formerly a facility of the Irvington School District and now converted to condominiums. (The school was listed on the National Register of Historic Places in 1983.) East Irvington was formerly known as "Dublin" from the population of Irish immigrant laborers there who worked on the large estates in the area, on the railroads and docks, or in the stone quarries, the remnants of which still exist.
