= New York State Route 9A =

Highway in New York

New York State Route 9A
- NY 9A highlighted in red

Route information
- Auxiliary route of US 9
- Maintained by NYSDOT, NYCDOT, MTAB&T and the City of Yonkers
- Length: 47.25 mi (76.04 km)
- Existed: 1930–present
- Restrictions: No commercial vehicles between exits 8 and 23

Major junctions
- South end: I-478 Toll / FDR Drive / Battery Place in Battery Park City
- I-95 / US 1-9 in Fort Washington Park; US 9 / Henry Hudson Parkway in Riverdale; Saw Mill River Parkway in Yonkers and Mount Pleasant; I-87 Toll / New York Thruway in Ardsley; I-287 in Elmsford; NY 100 / NY 141 / Saw Mill River Parkway in Hawthorne; Taconic State Parkway in Mount Pleasant; US 9 / NY 129 in Croton-on-Hudson
- North end: US 9 in Peekskill

Location
- Country: United States
- State: New York
- Counties: New York, Bronx, Westchester

Highway system
- New York Highways; Interstate; US; State; Reference; Parkways
← US 9	→ NY 9B
← US 6	NY 6A	→ NY 6B

New York State Route 9A (NY 9A) is a state highway in the vicinity of New York City in the United States. Its southern terminus is at Battery Place near the northern end of the Brooklyn–Battery Tunnel in New York City, where it intersects with both the unsigned Interstate 478 (I-478) and FDR Drive. The northern terminus of NY 9A is at U.S. Route 9 (US 9) in Peekskill. It is predominantly an alternate route of US 9 between New York City and Peekskill; however, in New York City, it is a major route of its own as it runs along the West Side Highway and Henry Hudson Parkway. It is also one of only two signed New York State routes in Manhattan (the other is NY 25). In northern Westchester County, NY 9A follows the Briarcliff–Peekskill Parkway.

The origins of NY 9A date back to the 1920s when an alternate route of then-NY 6 from Yonkers to Tarrytown was designated as NY 6A. NY 6 was redesignated as US 9 in 1927; however, NY 6A was not renumbered to NY 9A until the 1930 renumbering of state highways in New York. NY 9A was extended south into New York City in 1934 and north to Ossining in the late 1930s. In 1933, the Briarcliff–Peekskill Parkway opened as NY 404. All of NY 404 was incorporated into an extended NY 9A on January 1, 1949. NY 9A was extended northward to Peekskill in 1967 following the completion of the Croton Expressway and southward to the Brooklyn–Battery Tunnel in the mid-1990s.

== Route description ==
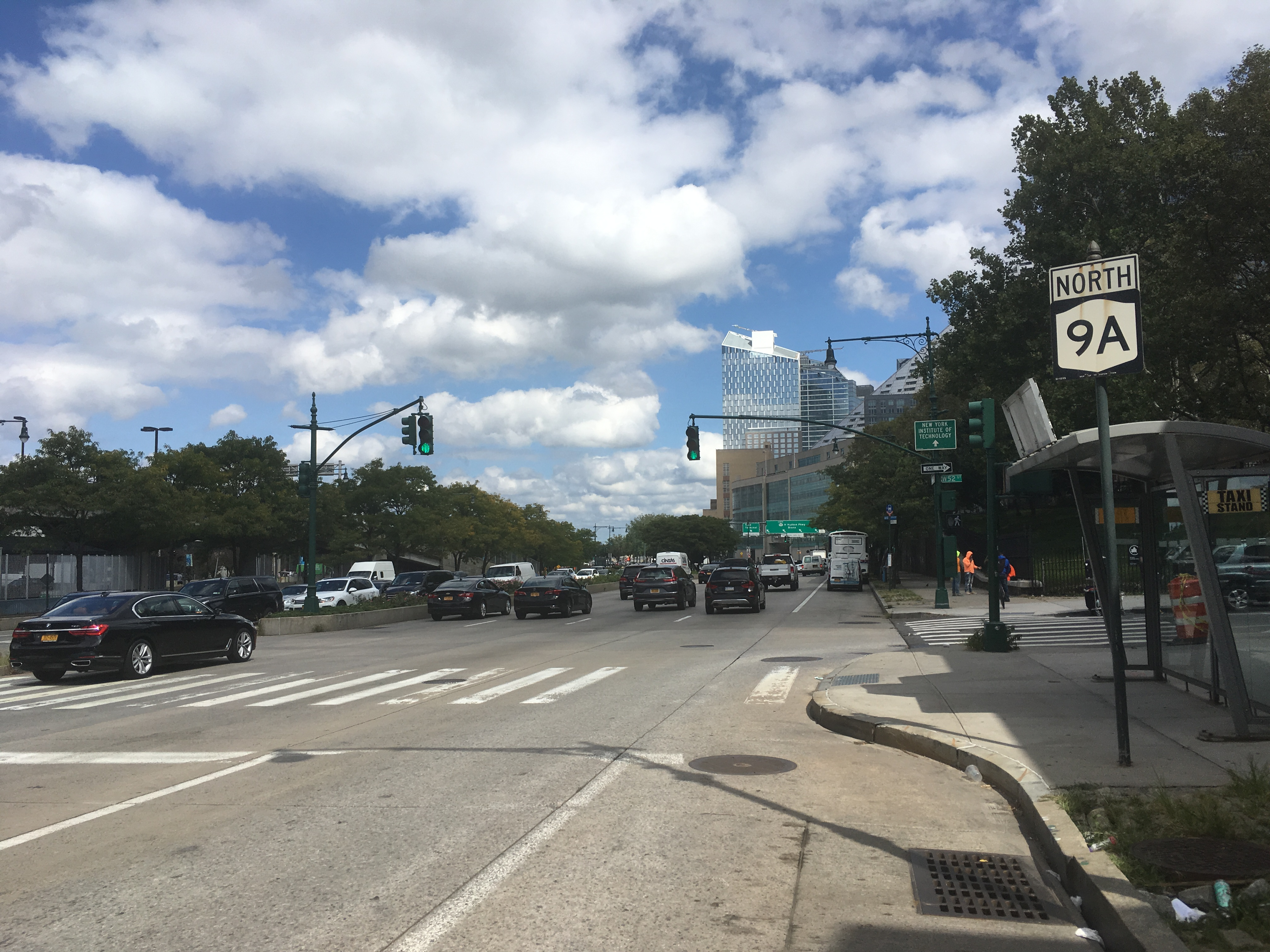
NY 9A northbound at 52nd Street in Manhattan

NY 9A begins in Lower Manhattan at Battery Place near the north end of the Brooklyn–Battery Tunnel (unsigned I-478) and heads north on the West Side Highway and Henry Hudson Parkway, crossing US 9 for the first time at the east end of the George Washington Bridge. After crossing into the Bronx via the Triborough Bridge and Tunnel Authority-owned Henry Hudson Bridge, NY 9A proceeds to leave the parkway at exit 23, joining US 9 on Broadway. The portions of NY 9A between Lower Manhattan and 72nd Street, and from 125th Street to the New York City line (with the exception of the Henry Hudson Bridge) are owned by the New York State Department of Transportation, the portion between 72nd and 125th Streets is owned by the New York City Department of Parks & Recreation and the entire highway within city limits is maintained on a daily basis by the New York City Department of Transportation. The concurrency between US 9 and NY 9A runs for 2.87 miles (4.62 km) within the city of Yonkers. All of NY 9A within Yonkers is maintained by the city.

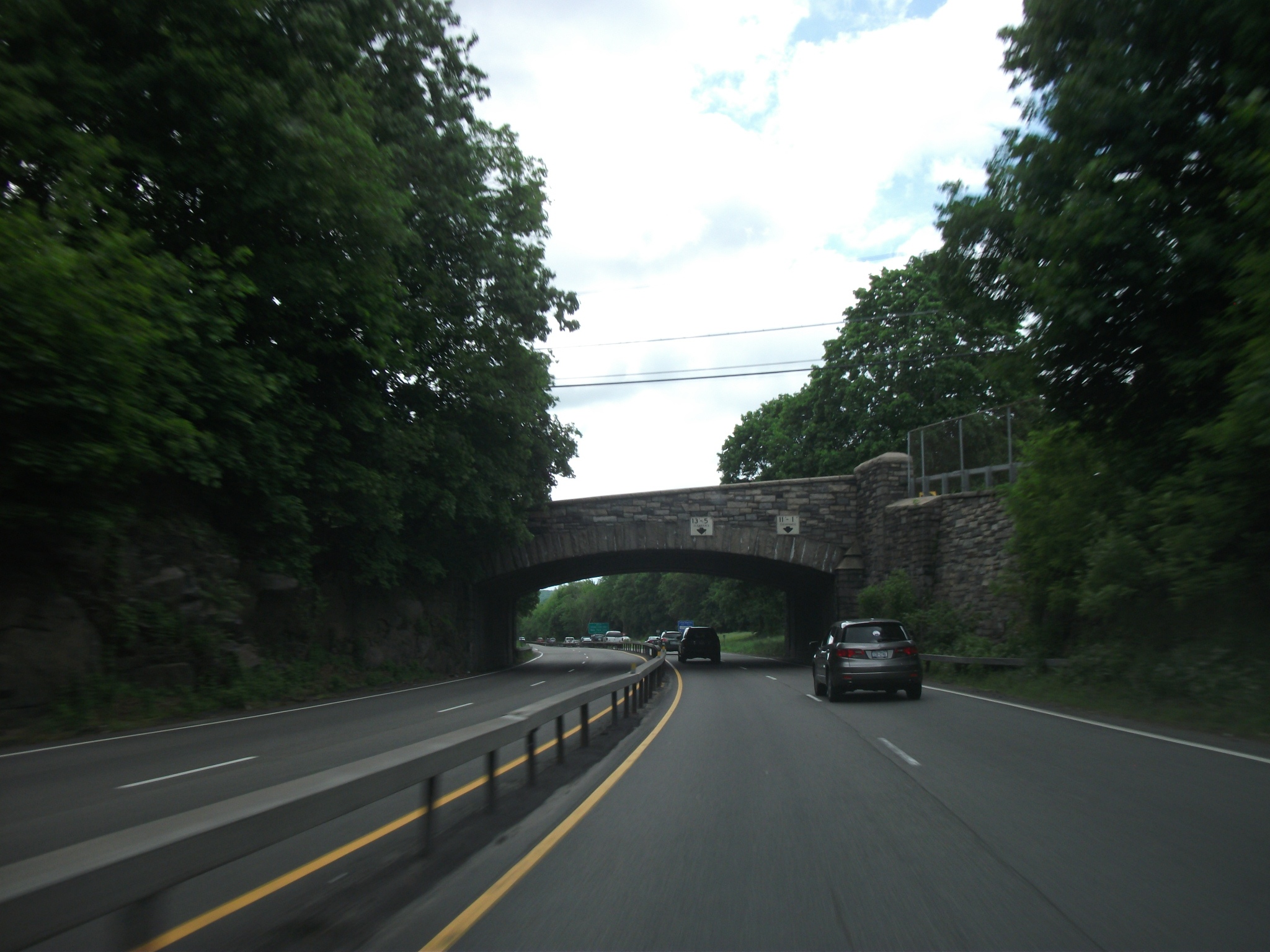
NY 9A and NY 100 southbound in Briarcliff Manor

NY 9A separates from US 9 along Ashburton Avenue and heads north as Saw Mill River Road. It parallels the Saw Mill River Parkway through Ardsley and Elmsford, to the west side of Hawthorne. The route meets the southbound New York State Thruway (I-87) at a partial interchange and later meets I-287 (the Cross Westchester Expressway) at a full interchange that provides a route to the northbound Thruway (I-87). NY 100 merges with NY 9A to form a 3.11-mile (5.01 km) concurrency carrying the names Saw Mill River Road and Briarcliff–Peekskill Parkway, parallel to the Taconic State Parkway. NY 9A exits off this highway along the Briarcliff–Peekskill Parkway, while NY 100 continues straight as Saw Mill River Road. NY 9A merges to form a brief concurrency with US 9 as the Croton Expressway in Ossining just south of the Croton River.

The second concurrency between US 9 and NY 9A runs for 1.10 miles, with NY 9A leaving the Croton Expressway at NY 129 in Croton-on-Hudson. The highway heads north along Riverside Avenue and eventually joins old Albany Post Road. After crossing US 9 once more in Cortlandt, NY 9A ends at the Welcher Avenue interchange in southern Peekskill.

== History ==
Prior to the establishment of the U.S. Highway System, US 9 was designated as NY 6. An alternate route from Yonkers to Tarrytown was assigned the NY 6A designation by 1926. This ran along the present alignment of NY 9A from Yonkers to north of Elmsford, where it turned west on Old Saw Mill River Road, Neperan Road, County House Road and Bedford Road to end at NY 6 in Tarrytown. NY 6 was redesignated as US 9 when U.S. Highways were first posted in New York in 1927; however, NY 6A was not renumbered at this time. It was finally renumbered to NY 9A as part of the 1930 renumbering of state highways in New York.

In Westchester County, Saw Mill River Road originally followed the Saw Mill River Parkway corridor from Eastview to Hawthorne. This section of Saw Mill River Road gained a number c. 1931, becoming part of NY 142, a route that began at NY 100 on the Greenburgh–Mount Pleasant town line and followed Grasslands Road, NY 9A, and Saw Mill River Road north to Hawthorne, where it rejoined NY 100. The route went unchanged until it was removed c. 1938. Its former routing was split into two routes—an extended NY 141 north of NY 9A and the new NY 100C along Grasslands Road—by 1940.

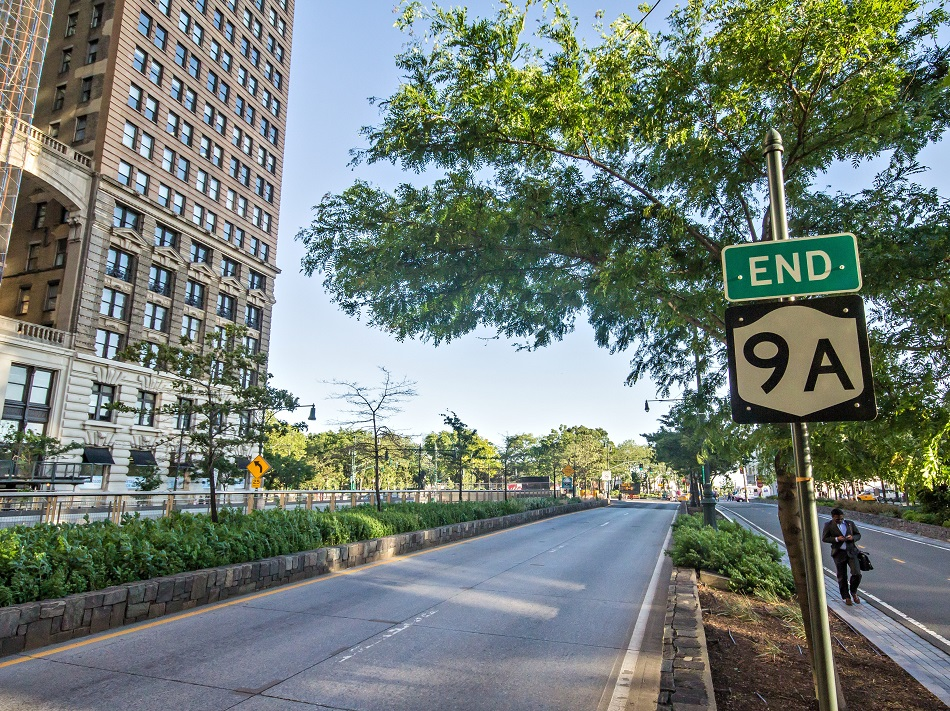
NY 9A end sign approaching its southern terminus at Battery Place in Battery Park City

As the Henry Hudson Parkway replaced Riverside Drive in the mid-1930s, NY 9A was moved onto it, eventually using the new parkway to where it crossed US 9 (Broadway) in the Bronx. Here, NY 9A exited the parkway and ran concurrent with US 9 to the split in Yonkers. The Brooklyn–Battery Tunnel connecting Manhattan's Battery Park to Brooklyn was completed in 1950.

NY 9A was extended northward c. 1939 from Tarrytown to Archville, a small hamlet midway between Tarrytown and Ossining, by way of Sleepy Hollow Road, in 1938.

Farther north, a new limited-access parkway was built around Ossining from Saw Mill River Road (NY 100) in Briarcliff Manor to US 9 north of Ossining. The parkway, known as the Briarcliff–Peekskill Parkway, was completed c. 1933 and initially designated as NY 404. On January 1, 1949, NY 9A was altered to continue north along a slightly realigned Saw Mill River Road from NY 100C near Elmsford to the south end of the Briarcliff–Peekskill Parkway in Briarcliff Manor. At this point, NY 9A left Saw Mill River Road and followed the parkway to its end at US 9, supplanting NY 404. The realignment created a 3-mile (5 km) overlap between NY 9A and NY 100 from Hawthorne to Briarcliff Manor and resulted in the truncation of NY 141 back to its previous terminus in Hawthorne.

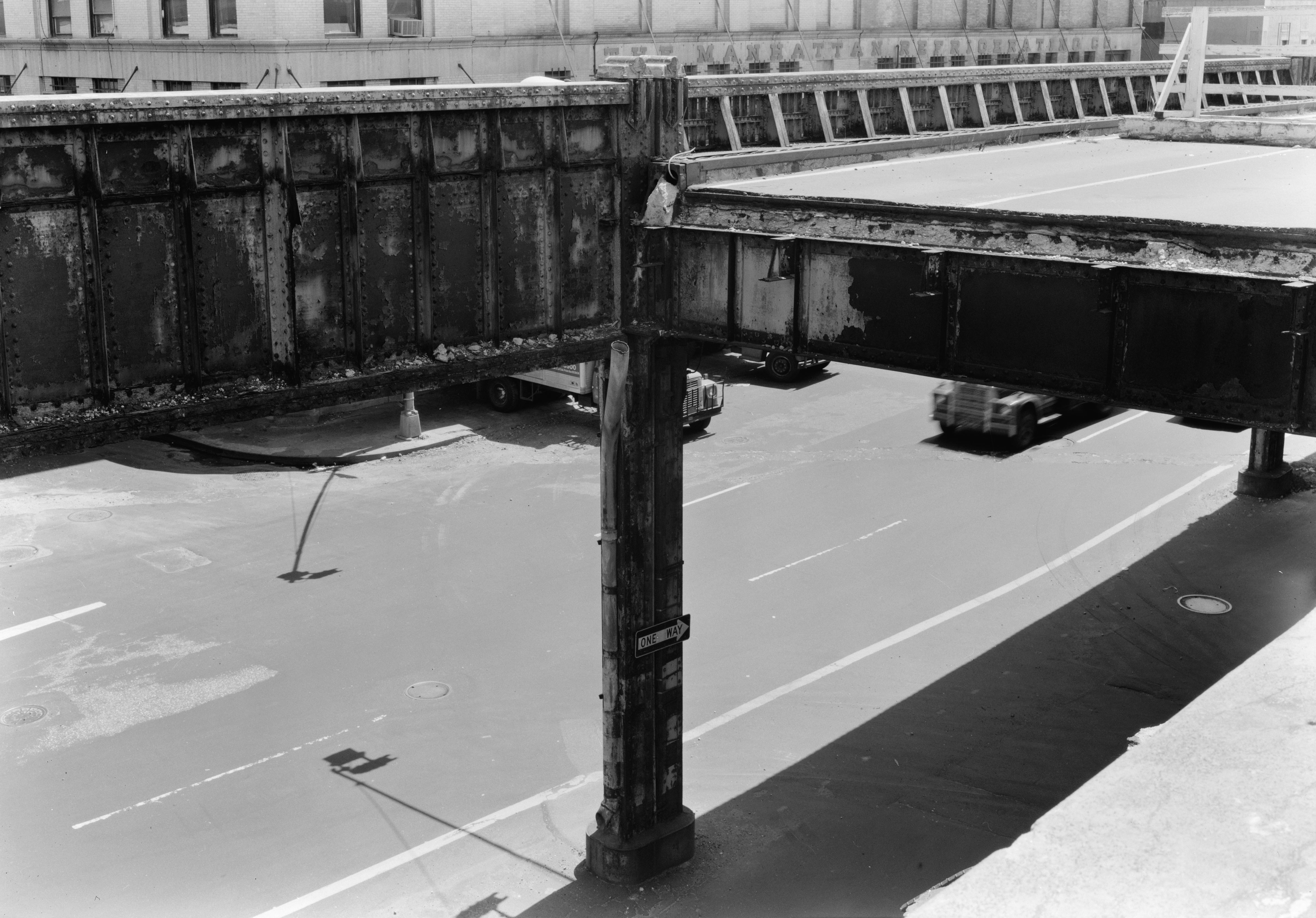
1974 photo of the collapsed section of the West Side Elevated Highway at 14th Street

Construction on the Croton Expressway, the only piece of the failed Hudson River Expressway project that was ever built, began in the mid-1960s. It became part of a realigned US 9 when it was completed by 1967. The former surface routing of US 9 along Albany Post Road between Croton-on-Hudson and Buchanan became a northward extension of NY 9A, which reached the old alignment by way of an overlap with US 9 from the north end of the Briarcliff–Peekskill Parkway to Croton-on-Hudson.

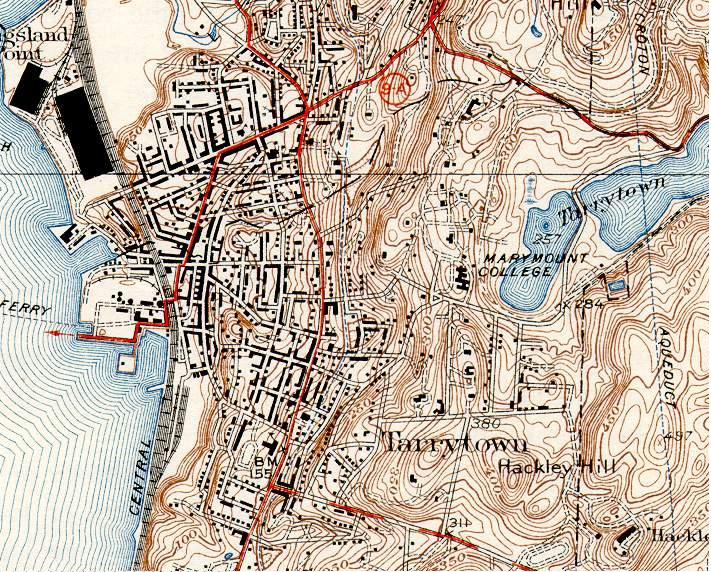
Tarrytown, including US 9 and NY 9A, in 1938.

New York City initially did not mark numbered routes within its limits. In 1932, the New York Automobile Club drafted a plan establishing alignments for several routes through the city. In this plan, NY 9A went south through the Bronx and into Manhattan on Broadway while US 9 used Riverdale Avenue north of 230th Street. As a result, the two routes would have had a short concurrency across Spuyten Duyvil Creek. NY 9A would have split to the south on Tenth Avenue at 218th Street in order to join the Harlem River Drive via Nagle Avenue and Dyckman Street. From there it would head west on 155th Street to Amsterdam Avenue, where it would head south to 79th Street, heading west there to rejoin US 9 at Riverside Drive. US 9 would have continued south through lower Manhattan to Staten Island via the Staten Island Ferry; however, it is unclear whether NY 9A would have continued south with US 9 to lower Manhattan. The New York Automobile Club released another plan in 1933. This plan made no changes to NY 9A; however, US 9 was changed to use Broadway all the way through the Bronx and to travel to New Jersey by way of the Holland Tunnel. In the final plan implemented in mid-December 1934, no route was assigned to the Harlem River Drive–Amsterdam Avenue corridor. Instead, NY 9A used what had been planned as US 9, splitting at Broadway and Dyckman Street. NY 9A ran south along the west side of Manhattan on Riverside Drive and the West Side Elevated Highway (detouring around an unfinished section via 57th Street, Eleventh Avenue and 48th Street) to end at the entrance and exit plazas of the Holland Tunnel. US 9 was shifted northward to enter New Jersey via the George Washington Bridge.

By 1960, an extension of the West Side Elevated Highway south to the Manhattan tunnel portal became part of NY 27A, which had ended in Brooklyn prior to the construction of the tunnel.

On January 1, 1970, NY 27A was truncated on its western end to eastern Nassau County while NY 27 was extended northward over NY 27A's former routing through the Battery Tunnel and the West Side Elevated Highway.

The extension of I-478 into Manhattan was eliminated following the collapse of part of the Elevated Highway in 1973, an event which led to the demolition of the highway south of 59th Street. Demolition was completed in 1989. NY 9A was shifted onto 12th Avenue, one of the surface streets that the Elevated Highway had run atop of, but was otherwise unaffected as the route's south end was initially kept at the Lincoln Tunnel. However, by 1973, NY 27 had been cut back to its interchange with the Gowanus Expressway in Brooklyn while unsigned I-478 was assigned to both the Battery Tunnel and all of the West Side Elevated Highway south of the Lincoln Tunnel. NY 9A was cut back to the Lincoln Tunnel as a result.

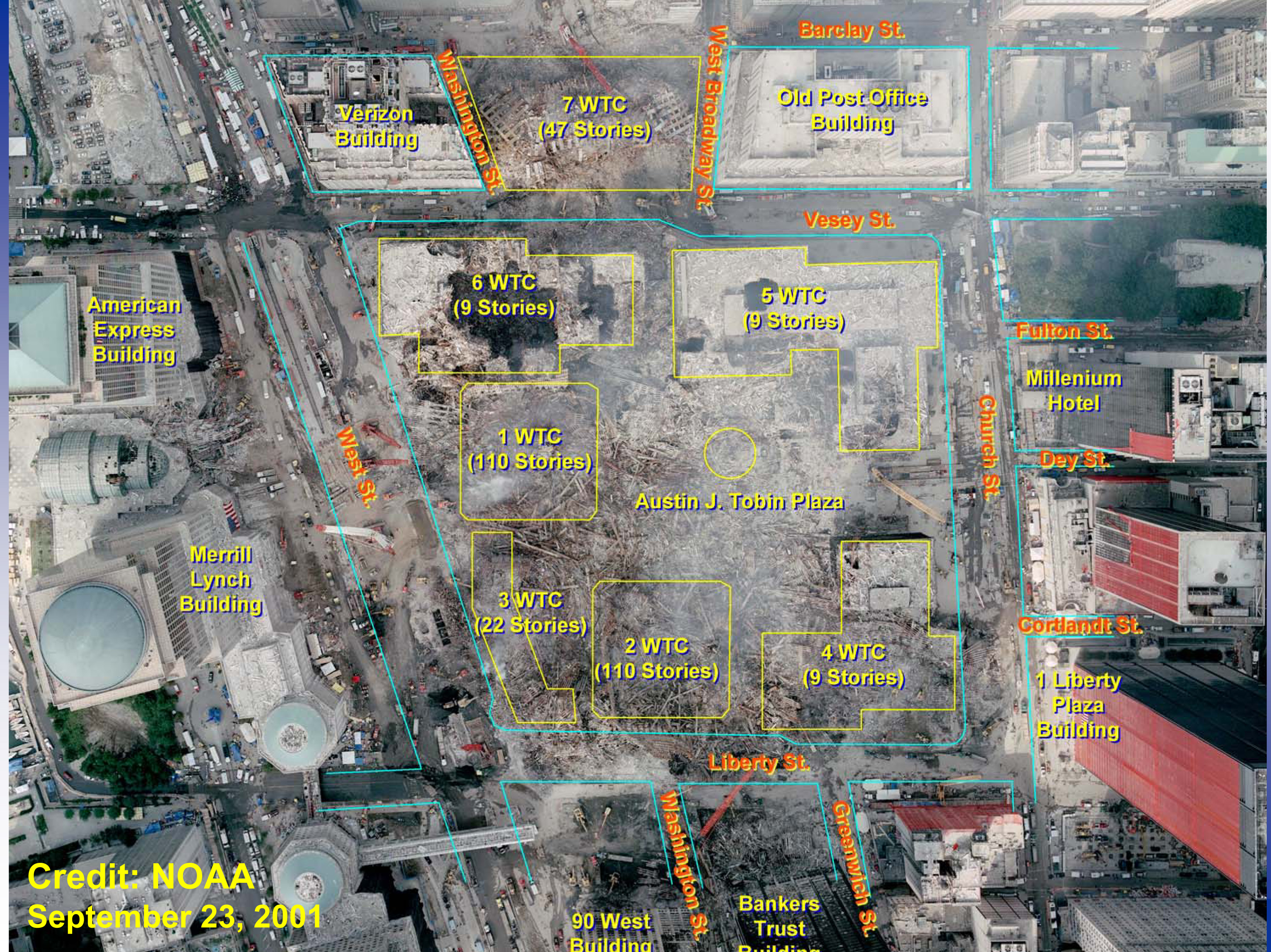
Satellite view of Ground Zero after 9/11, with NY 9A (West St.) on the left covered with debris.

Construction began in early 1996 on a project to convert the section of NY 9A south of 59th Street into the West Side Highway, a six-lane urban boulevard with a parkway-style median and decorative lightposts. The first of the project's seven segments—between Clarkson and Horatio streets in the Greenwich Village neighborhood—was completed in 1998. As part of this, NY 9A was extended south to the Battery Tunnel by way of 12th Avenue and two other streets the Elevated Highway had previously run atop of, West Street and 11th Avenue. Completion of the project was originally set for October 2001; however, it was delayed for years due to damage caused by the September 11 attacks. It was finished by 2014.

== Major intersections ==
County	Location	mi	km	Exit	Destinations	Notes
Manhattan	Battery Park	0.00	0.00		Battery Place	Southern terminus
Manhattan	Battery Park City	0.10	0.16	1	FDR Drive north	Interchange; southbound exit and northbound entrance; southern terminus of FDR Drive
Manhattan	Battery Park City	0.20– 0.40	0.32– 0.64	2	Hugh L. Carey Tunnel (I-478 Toll south) to I-278 – Brooklyn	Former NY 27A
Manhattan	Tribeca	1.45	2.33	3	Canal Street to I-78 west (Holland Tunnel) – New Jersey	
Manhattan	Greenwich Village	2.43	3.91	4	10th Avenue – Meat Market	
Manhattan	Chelsea	3.32	5.34	5	West 30th Street to NY 495 west (Lincoln Tunnel) – New Jersey	Lincoln Tunnel exit for cars
Manhattan	Hell's Kitchen	4.00	6.44	6	West 40th Street / West 42nd Street to NY 495 west (Lincoln Tunnel) – New Jersey	Lincoln Tunnel exit for all vehicles
Manhattan	Hell's Kitchen	4.66	7.50	7	West 56th Street / West 57th Street	Exit number not signed southbound
Manhattan	Hell's Kitchen	4.90	7.89	Southern end of freeway section		
Manhattan	Hell's Kitchen	4.90	7.89	8	West 59th Street – Ship Terminal	Northbound exit only; all trucks must exit
Manhattan	Hell's Kitchen	5.42	8.72	9	West 72nd Street	Northbound entrance only
Manhattan	Hell's Kitchen	5.42	8.72	Transition between West Side Highway and Henry Hudson Parkway		
Manhattan	Riverside Park	5.73	9.22	10	West 79th Street – Boat Basin	Signed as exits 10A (79th Street) and 10B (Boat Basin) northbound; exit number not signed southbound
Manhattan	Riverside Park	6.56	10.56	11	West 95th Street	Southbound exit only; exit number not signed
Manhattan	Riverside Park	6.56	10.56	11	West 96th Street	No southbound exit; exit number not signed
Manhattan	Harlem	7.69	12.38	12	West 125th Street	Exit number not signed northbound
Manhattan	Hamilton Heights	9.49	15.27	13	West 158th Street	
Manhattan	Fort Washington Park	10.14	16.32	14	I-95 (George Washington Bridge) / Riverside Drive / West 178th Street – Cross Bronx Expressway	Exit 1A on I-95; no northbound access to Riverside Drive; West 178th Street not signed southbound
Manhattan	Fort Washington Park	10.39	16.72	15	Riverside Drive south	Northbound exit and entrance
Manhattan	Fort Tryon Park	11.8	19.0	16	Fort Tryon Park, Cloisters	Northbound exit and entrance; access via Fort Tryon Place
Manhattan	Inwood Hill Park			17	To Dyckman Street	No southbound exit; access via Riverside Drive; last northbound exit before toll
Manhattan	Inwood Hill Park	12.18	19.60	17	Dyckman Street	Southbound exit only
Spuyten Duyvil Creek (Harlem River)		12.80– 13.02	20.60– 20.95	Henry Hudson Bridge (toll; E-ZPass or Tolls by Mail)		
The Bronx	Spuyten Duyvil	13.26	21.34	18	Kappock Street	No entrance ramps; last southbound exit before toll
The Bronx	Spuyten Duyvil	13.6	21.9	19	West 232nd Street	
The Bronx	Riverdale	14.0	22.5	20	West 237th Street / West 239th Street	Signed for 237th Street southbound, 239th Street northbound
The Bronx	Riverdale	14.4	23.2	21	West 246th Street	No southbound entrance
The Bronx	Riverdale	14.88	23.95	22	West 253rd Street / West 254th Street / Riverdale Avenue	Signed for 253rd Street northbound, 254th Street southbound
The Bronx	Fieldston	15.35	24.70	23	US 9 south (Broadway) / Henry Hudson Parkway north – Yonkers	Southern end of US 9 concurrency; northern end of H.H. Parkway concurrency; all trucks must exit
The Bronx	Fieldston	15.35	24.70	Northern end of freeway section		
Westchester	Yonkers	18.21	29.31		US 9 north (Broadway) – Hastings-on-Hudson	Northern end of US 9 concurrency
Westchester	Yonkers				Saw Mill River Parkway north to I-87 / New York Thruway / Sprain Brook Parkway	Access to Saw Mill Parkway via Rossiter Avenue; access to I-87/Sprain Parkway via Tuckahoe Road; exit 7 on Saw Mill Parkway
Westchester	Hastings-on-Hudson				To Saw Mill River Parkway north	Access via Farragut Avenue
Westchester	Dobbs Ferry				To Saw Mill River Parkway	Access via Lawrence Street
Westchester	Ardsley				I-87 Toll south (New York Thruway) – New York City	Exit 7 on I-87 / Thruway
Westchester	Ardsley				To Saw Mill River Parkway	Access via Ashford Avenue
Westchester	Greenburgh	25.58	41.17		NY 100B east – White Plains, Greenburgh	Western terminus of NY 100B
Westchester	Elmsford	28.13	45.27		NY 119 (East Main Street) – White Plains, Tarrytown	
Westchester	Elmsford	28.41	45.72		I-287 (Cross Westchester Expressway) – White Plains, Rye, Tappan Zee Bridge	Exit 2 on I-287; former I-487
Westchester	Greenburgh				NY 100C east	Western terminus of NY 100C
Westchester	Greenburgh–Mount Pleasant line				NY 100C (Old Saw Mill River Road) to Saw Mill River Parkway	Interchange; no southbound access to NY 100C
Westchester	Mount Pleasant	30.94	49.79		Saw Mill River Parkway north – Katonah, Brewster	Exit 25 on Saw Mill River Parkway
Westchester	Hawthorne	32.00	51.50	Southern end of limited-access section		
Westchester	Hawthorne	32.10	51.66	–	NY 100 south / NY 141 north to Bronx River Parkway / Sprain Brook Parkway – Hawthorne, Thornwood	Southern end of NY 100 concurrency; southern terminus of NY 141
Westchester	Mount Pleasant	32.22	51.85	–	Saw Mill River Parkway south – New York City	Southbound exit only
Westchester	Mount Pleasant	33.35	53.67	–	NY 117 – Pleasantville, Sleepy Hollow	
Westchester	Mount Pleasant	33.90	54.56	–	Taconic State Parkway south – New York City	Southbound exit and northbound entrance; exit 5 on Taconic State Parkway
Westchester	Briarcliff Manor	35.10	56.49	–	Pleasantville Road east	Northbound exit and entrance
Westchester	Briarcliff Manor	35.10	56.49	–	Pleasantville Road west	Southbound exit and entrance
Westchester	Briarcliff Manor	35.40	56.97	–	NY 100 north	Northern end of NY 100 concurrency
Westchester	Briarcliff Manor	35.70	57.45	–	North State Road	At-grade intersection
Westchester	Briarcliff Manor	36.40	58.58	–	Chappaqua Road	At-grade intersection
Westchester	Village of Ossining	36.90	59.38	–	NY 133 – Ossining, Millwood	
Westchester	Village of Ossining	37.20	59.87	–	Ryder Road	Southbound exit and entrance
Westchester	Town of Ossining	38.20	61.48	–	NY 134 – Ossining	At-grade intersection
Westchester	Town of Ossining	38.40	61.80	–	Hawkes Avenue (NY 134)	Northbound exit and entrance
Westchester	Town of Ossining	39.00	62.76	–	Cedar Lane	Northbound exit and entrance
Westchester	Town of Ossining	39.50	63.57	–	Shady Lane Farm Road – Ossining	Northbound exit only
Westchester	Town of Ossining	39.70	63.89	–	US 9 south – Tarrytown	No northbound exit; southern end of US 9 concurrency
Westchester	Town of Ossining			–	Croton River Road	Northbound exit and entrance; former routing of US 9
Westchester	Croton-on-Hudson	40.40	65.02	–	Croton Point Avenue – Croton–Harmon Station	
Westchester	Croton-on-Hudson	41.10	66.14	–	US 9 north – Peekskill, Yorktown	Northern end of US 9 concurrency
Westchester	Croton-on-Hudson	41.10	66.14	Northern end of limited-access section		
Westchester	Croton-on-Hudson	41.20	66.30		NY 129 east	Western terminus of NY 129
Westchester	Croton-on-Hudson	42.20	67.91		US 9 / Senasaqua Road – Peekskill, Tarrytown	Interchange
Westchester	Cortlandt	44.30	71.29		US 9 – Peekskill, Tarrytown	Interchange
Westchester	Peekskill	47.90	77.09		US 9 – Bear Mountain Bridge, Tarrytown	Interchange; northern terminus
1.000 mi = 1.609 km; 1.000 km = 0.621 mi: Concurrency terminus; Electronic toll collection; Incomplete access; Route transition

== See also ==
- New Jersey Route 139, which continued NY 9A back to US 9 in Jersey City when it was US 9 Business.
