= Sprain Brook Parkway =

North–south parkway in Westchester County, New York

Sprain Brook Parkway
- Sprain Brook Parkway highlighted in red

Route information
- Maintained by NYSDOT
- Length: 12.65 mi (20.36 km)
- Existed: 1961–present
- History: Full length opened October 28, 1980
- Restrictions: No commercial vehicles

Major junctions
- South end: Bronx River Parkway in Yonkers
- NY 100 in Yonkers and Hawthorne; NY 100B in Greenburgh; I-287 in Elmsford; NY 100C at the Greenburgh–Mount Pleasant line
- North end: Taconic State Parkway in Hawthorne

Location
- Country: United States
- State: New York
- Counties: Westchester

Highway system
- New York Highways; Interstate; US; State; Reference; Parkways

The Sprain Brook Parkway (also known as the Sprain Parkway or The Sprain) is a 12.65-mile (20.36 km) controlled-access parkway in Westchester County, New York, United States. It begins at an interchange with the Bronx River Parkway in the city of Yonkers, and ends at the former site of the Hawthorne Circle, where it merges into the Taconic State Parkway. The parkway serves an alternate to the Bronx River Parkway, boasting an interchange connection through western Westchester with Interstate 287. New York's Department of Transportation (NYSDOT) refers to it internally as New York State Route 987F (NY 987F), an unsigned reference route.

The Sprain Brook was first proposed in the early 1920s as a parkway between the Bronx River Parkway and the Hawthorne Circle. The parkway sold a majority of its right-of-way in the 1920s, but the proposed parkway met strong opposition from the village of Bronxville and Yonkers. The Sprain Brook proposal sat on the table until 1949, when the State Council of Parks, run by Robert Moses, sought to ease congestion on the Bronx River Parkway. Moses proposed that a new state park would be constructed in Westchester, with the Sprain Brook Parkway serving as a traffic alternative to the Bronx River, and nearly a decade and a half after the parkway was deeded land. This time, Bronxville opposed the project rather than Yonkers, but an agreement was worked out in 1951. This new alignment would bypass the parts of Bronxville and Yonkers to construct the freeway.

Construction of the alternative highway began in 1958, with the stretch from the Bronx River Parkway to Tuckahoe Road. This section was completed in 1961. The next piece, from Tuckahoe Road to Jackson Avenue, was constructed during 1962 and 1963, with it opening in the latter. Construction continued to the Cross Westchester Expressway (I-287) and was completed in 1969. At this point, the last missing piece was between the Cross Westchester and the Hawthorne Circle. This piece was delayed until 1976, when construction began on the last 2.7 miles (4.3 km) of parkway. The last piece of the parkway was opened on October 28, 1980, having cost $25 million (equivalent to $98 million in 2025).

From its opening in 1961 until 1979, the parkway was maintained by the East Hudson Parkway Authority, a commission created to maintain tolls on the Saw Mill River Parkway, the Bronx River Parkway and to provide general maintenance for the Taconic State Parkway. The authority was abolished in 1979, at which time, all maintenance of the Sprain Brook Parkway was turned over to NYSDOT.

== Route description ==
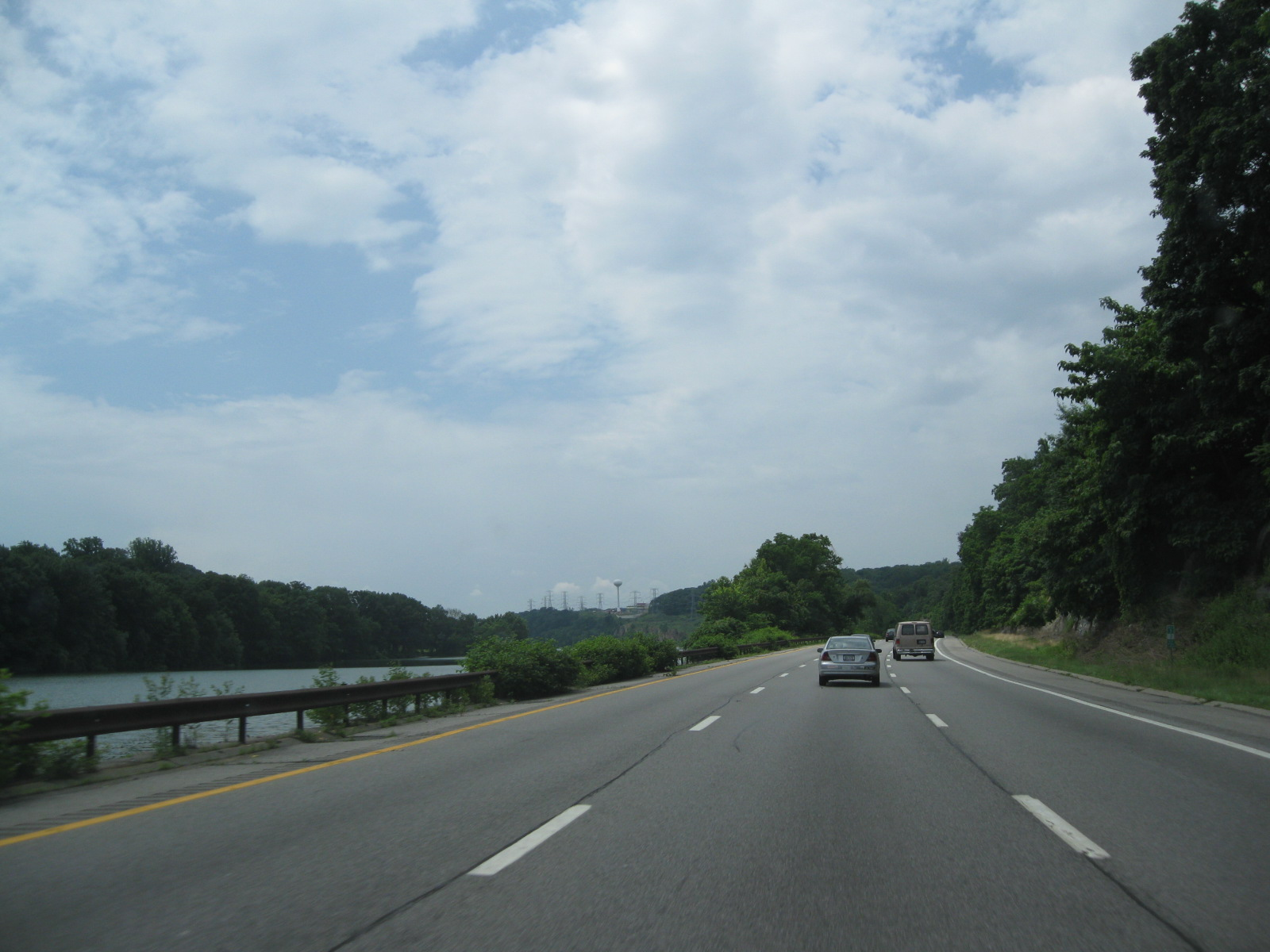
Sprain Brook Parkway southbound lanes during the fork for the Grassy Sprain Reservoir

The Sprain Brook Parkway, designated by the New York State Department of Transportation as NY 987F, a state reference route, begins at a fork from the Bronx River Parkway along the latter's right-of-way along the Bronx River in the city of Yonkers. Crossing through the Northeast Yonkers neighborhood as a six-lane freeway, the Sprain Brook crosses an interchange with NY 100 (Central Park Avenue) south of Andrus Park. Bending to the north through Yonkers, the Sprain Brook reaches an interchange with Tuckahoe Road, with the northbound and southbound lanes splitting around the Grassy Sprain Reservoir. The two directions bend northeast along the reservoir. The southbound lanes cross Sprain Ridge Park, while the northbound lanes cross through a golf course. Leaving Yonkers for the town of Greenburgh, the lanes of the Sprain Brook come back together, reaching an interchange with Jackson Avenue. The six-lane parkway continues northward and to the northeast through Greenburgh, crossing under Ardsley Road. After turning northward once again, the Sprain Brook crosses under a former alignment of NY 131 (Underhill Road) and passes by the Sunningdale Country Club.

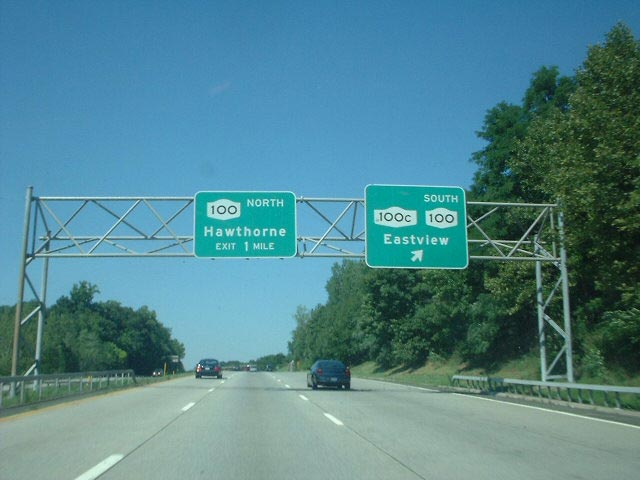
The Sprain Brook at the junction with NY 100 and NY 100C in Greenburgh

Continuing its north/northeast winding, the Sprain Brook enters an interchange with NY 100B (Dobbs Ferry Road), passing by East Rumbrook Park. Crossing over NY 119 in Elmsford, the parkway enters an interchange with Interstate 287 (the Cross Westchester Expressway). After crossing through the interchange, the Sprain continues northward as a six-lane parkway back through the town of Greenburgh, entering an interchange with NY 100C (Grasslands Road). Paralleling NY 100 to the west, the parkway, bending northward into Mount Pleasant and an interchange with County Route 301 (Bradhurst Entrance North Road), which connects to NY 100 (Bradhurst Avenue). North of that junction, the southbound lanes of the Sprain Brook interchange with a crossing NY 100. After several bends to the north, the Sprain Brook enters the merging Taconic State Parkway and terminates as the right-of-way continues as the Taconic.

The Sprain Brook Parkway sees an average of 95,442 vehicles per day throughout its entire length. The stretch between I-287 and NY 100C sees the highest amount, with 101,460 cars in a 2011 report. The stretch between NY 100 in Yonkers and Jackson Avenue in Greenburgh sees the second-highest, at 100,900, which is an upgrade of over 19,000 vehicles since the same report in 1997.

== History ==
=== Original proposal ===
What ultimately became the Sprain Brook Parkway began taking form in the 1920s, when the Westchester County Road Commission acquired the right-of-way for a planned 16-mile (26 km) extension of the Taconic State Parkway. The land, bought from 1925 to 1927 for $1.5 million ($27.8 million in modern dollars), was, however, not used as a parkway, and in 1938, was proposed to be used instead as an arterial state highway, rather than a parkway. The commission sent a request in April 1938 to the State Council of Parks to have the state take over the right-of-way after the state withdrew its support for the parkway extension. In April 1938, the county was approached by the Westchester County Park Commission to transfer the new project to the state for construction by the State Council of Parks. The project, which at the time would have cost $7 million ($160 million in modern dollars), was to connect to the Robert Moses-proposed highway between New York City and Albany.

Opposition to this plan was immediate. Yonkers officials publicly disapproved, saying that the county would lose any hope for state aid. In January 1939, the village of Bronxville joined the opposition, deeming the new parkway as a "needless expenditure of public money" that would adversely affect local property values and cause flooding. At the same time, proposals in the state legislature provided a sum of $25,000 for the project. County executive William Bleakley said that a new parkway should be built, but not so close to the Saw Mill River and Bronx River parkways. He argued instead for the use of New York Central Railroad's right-of-way, or a parkway on the Hudson River. There were also fears a new parkway would siphon off toll-paying drivers who previously used the Cross County Parkway and its new Fleetwood Viaduct. Nor would it help the county's largest bottleneck, the Hawthorne Circle. The county's Board of Supervisors, however, disagreed with the executive.

In April 1941, county officials admitted that it was likely that the $7 million appropriated would not be enough, and instead it would be better spent on improving other nearby parkways. The proposed parkway would have needed $400,000 more for additional right-of-way, and the construction costs would leave no money to repave the Bronx River Parkway, the link to the Cross County Parkway, and to extend the Saw Mill River Parkway. The county would have had to spend $8 million of its own money as well. The parkway was instead shortened from Bronxville to Elmsford.

=== Revival ===
In March 1949, the State Council of Parks, led by Robert Moses, recommended the development of a new state park in the Sprain Valley. This new state park, which would also have a parkway built through it, would intend to take traffic off the congested Bronx River Parkway. This new parkway would be one of the construction projects involved, which included rebuilding the Bronx River and the development of Ridge Road Park. The Moses-led committee also suggested that $25,000 be appropriated for a study, survey and report on the new parkway and possible expansion of the Ridge Road Park. The city of Yonkers also became involved in the proposal because a 5 acres (2.0 ha) section of land needed between NY 100 (Central Park Avenue) and Palmer Road was deeded over to the state by Westchester County for the new $13 million ($176 million in 2025) parkway. Residents in Yonkers protested that this December 1949 transfer would require the demolition or defacing of $1 million worth of homes in the city.

In April 1950, the State Council of Parks met in Ardsley. Bronxville opposed the construction, claiming that there would be property value depreciation. However, there was no cited opposition for the parkway from any communities further north of Bronxville, and that officials from Westchester County were looking into ideas for an alternate route around Bronxville. At the time, the county had most of the right-of-way in Bronxville claimed, short of one piece. The need for the parkway was helped by the fact that widening of the Bronx River Parkway was not applicable due to land limitations and the prohibitory cost of acquiring land for a widening. The parkway, while creating a needed connection between the Saw Mill River Parkway and the Bronx River Parkway, would not answer the need for diverting traffic off the Hawthorne Circle and the issue of what to do with truck traffic. The parkway, if started, would take about three years to complete and would be constructed by the Taconic State Park Commission.

=== "Route A" ===
In February 1951, Westchester County started getting ready to approve the new parkway plans from the State of New York. The new $16–18 million ($241 million in 2025) parkway still had a short section still in question, with various groups preferring two different alignments. The State Council of Parks wanted to use the alignment used by the Odell Parkway, which still would require demolition of thirty homes in the Cedar Knolls section of Yonkers, while other groups wanted the parkway to be aligned through Crestwood, which would cost 100 homes. Five different sites were proposed at the meeting with the Westchester County Board of Supervisors on February 15. However, an agreement could not be reached by the committee and it was delayed to the next week. On February 19, the county board gave approval to the state plans, at a vote of 32 to 9. The letters of discontent amounted to fifty-nine letters or telegrams. Chairman Jefferson Armstrong spoke that the new parkway would lead to the "planning for the destruction of Westchester." He stated that the county was giving away $8 million in taxpayer funds to the state with a debt of $2.3 million after collecting tolls on the Saw Mill River and Hutchinson River parkways. Residents of the town of Greenburgh protested the county's decision to give the undeveloped Rochambeau Park for development into a state park.

In July 1951, the county of Westchester approved "Route A", one of the proposed alignments for the Sprain Brook through the city of Yonkers. Costing $10.512 million ($130 million in 2025), the route was approved by the state and the fact that the county still owned the right-of-way would determine whether the county would give it to the state. This 4.98-mile (8.01 km) section of parkway as part of Route A began at the Bronx River Parkway, extending to a point just north of Jackson Avenue. A hearing was held on June 18 that mentioned that only "Route F-1", which would cost $14.579 million, and was longer would be the only other acceptable proposal. People living along the "Route A" track preferred "Route F-1", which would take fifty-four homes, over the thirty from the accepted proposal.

During the meeting of the Westchester County Board of Supervisors on August 6, two officials from Yonkers attempted to filibuster the meeting to avoid the transfer of the Sprain Brook right-of-way, along with the "Route A" proposal, to the state. This filibuster failed, as the board voted 39 to 2 to transfer the right-of-way. The Taconic State Parkway Commission, Westchester County Park Commission, and the Westchester County Planning Commission all endorsed "Route A" over "Route F-1". However, the Ridge Road picnic area in Greenburgh was not given to the state. Remaining opposition stated that the route would cut $517,000 from tax revenue, and damage now $3 million worth of homes in the "Route A" section, which included the house of Jefferson Armstrong.

=== Construction ===
In December 1953, the county executive for Westchester County, Herbert Gerlach, proposed that the now $22 million ($265 million in 2025) parkway should be constructed with tolls to help pay for the new roadway. At this time, the southern 2.6 miles (4.2 km) of the Bronx River Parkway was being reconstructed for use in the new Sprain Brook Parkway, with funds received before the Korean War. Jefferson Armstrong declared the new plan as a scheme by Robert Moses to "spend beyond his pocketbook" and that Gerlach was "intolerant" for proposing this just before the start of the holiday season. At the same time, the proposal was made that the county could gain funds by re-appropriating usage of Westchester County Airport, which would cost the county $11 million a year, but would only gain the county $26,000 in revenue.

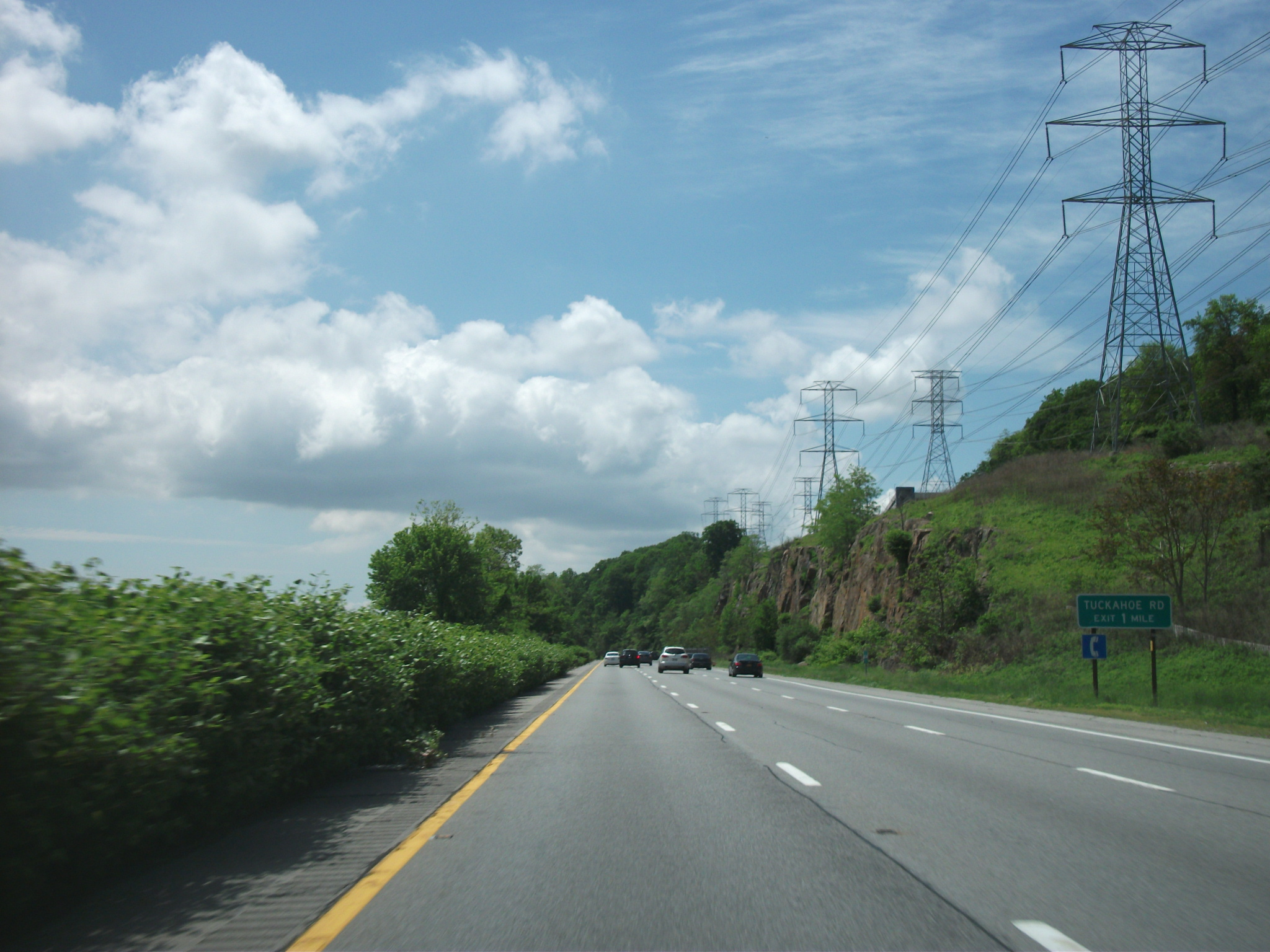
The Sprain Brook Parkway southbound 1 mile (1.6 km) north of Tuckahoe Road in North Yonkers. That interchange served as the northern terminus of the parkway from 1961–1963

On September 30, 1958, the State Department of Public Works notified Westchester County that it would begin construction of the Sprain Brook Parkway. Bids on the new parkway through Yonkers, with 2.27 miles (3.65 km) of six-lane divided parkway plus 4.69 miles (7.55 km) of access roads to the new roadway, would be opened on October 30, estimating the cost at $11.116 million. Slated to open in August 1961, this first leg of the Sprain Brook Parkway would connect from the Bronx River Parkway near Bronxville to 1,200 feet (370 m) north of Tuckahoe Road in North Yonkers. At that point in North Yonkers, it would meet with a connector to the New York State Thruway, which could open doors to getting tolls on the new roadway. Overpasses would be constructed at Midland Avenue, DeWitt Avenue, Central Avenue, Tuckahoe Road, Palmer Road, Kimball Avenue and the Bronx River Parkway, with an exit at Central Avenue, along with overpasses over the Sprain Brook, Sunny Brook and Grassy Sprain Brook.

The section of the Sprain Brook Parkway between Tuckahoe Road and Jackson Avenue in the town of Greenburgh was slated to cost $4.103 million ($44 million in 2025), a stretch of 2.6 miles (4.2 km) with 3.45 miles (5.55 km) of access roads. This new portion would have six lanes, with three on each side of the Grassy Sprain Reservoir, which would split the parkway in each direction. Bids were expected to be opened on November 16, 1961, for the extension of the new parkway, maintained by the East Hudson Parkway Authority. The new stretch of parkway was constructed throughout 1962 and 1963, with the East Hudson Parkway Authority announcing the opening of the extension on December 23, 1963, at a cost of $3.6 million ($38 million in 2025). The new interchange with Jackson Avenue would also serve Sprain Ridge Park, which was also being opened at the same time as the new parkway.

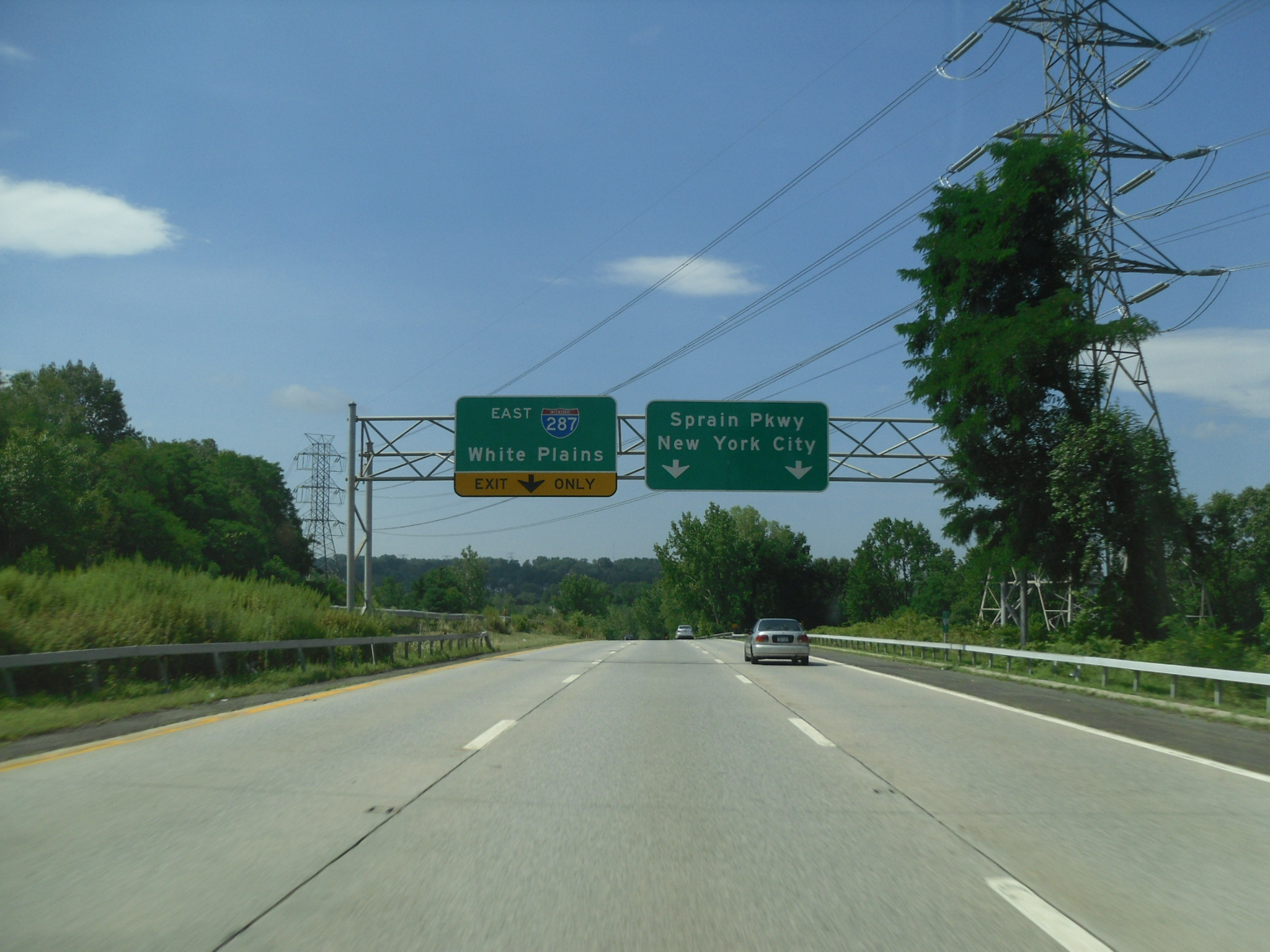
The Sprain Brook Parkway southbound at the Cross Westchester Expressway in Elmsford, which served as the northern end of the parkway from 1971 to 1980

The 5.2-mile (8.4 km) long section of the Sprain Brook Parkway was opened on November 27, 1969 from Jackson Avenue in Greenburgh to the Cross Westchester Expressway in Elmsford. This new section of Sprain Brook Parkway cost $15.4 million, extending the parkway to a length of 10 miles (16 km) from the Bronx to Elmsford. This also included an interchange with NY-100B in Greenburgh. An additional exit was planned at Ardsley Road to provide access to Scarsdale, Ardsley, and Dobbs Ferry, but was never built. Nelson Rockefeller, the governor of New York at the time, also noted that the extension of the parkway north from the Cross Westchester to the Hawthorne Traffic Circle was still in final design and would begin construction in 1971 with completion of a new interchange in Hawthorne.

=== Completion ===
The delay of the final 2.7 miles (4.3 km) long portion of the Sprain Brook from the Cross Westchester Expressway and the Taconic State Parkway near Hawthorne Circle spent multiple years without progress until demands were placed upon Governor Hugh Carey to get state funds attached to the project. The project had been delayed multiple times and local lobbying interests including Union Carbide threatened to back out of opening corporate locations in the area of the new extension, which in 1976 was slated to cost $20 million ($113 million in 2025). The East Hudson Parkway Authority (EHPA) originally proposed raising the tolls on the Saw Mill River and Hutchinson River parkways and building new tolls on the Hutchinson, along with the Bronx River and Taconic parkways. However, NYSDOT reported during a meeting in Albany that contracts on the new extension would be given in 1978. However, the EHPA also wanted more monetary funds for the maintenance of the parkway system in Westchester and wanted to raise the tolls to help pay for that cost.

Along the state funding from Albany, the rest of the money for the Sprain Brook extension was to be paid for through federal funds. The new parkway extension, which had a slated completion in December 1980, was bid on in 1978 and won by Yonkers Contracting Company for a total of $22.8 million ($254 million in 2025). Various materials in the extension included 100,000 cubic yards (2,700,000 cu ft) of gravel, 37,000 cubic yards (1,000,000 cu ft) of concrete, 24,000 cubic yards (650,000 cu ft) of asphalt and 1,900 pounds (860 kg) of steel. While the project started under the eyes of NYSDOT and EPHA, when the new parkway was complete, the East Hudson Parkway Authority had been disestablished in 1979 and control of the Sprain Brook had been turned back to NYSDOT.

The new parkway would lower traffic on NY 9A through Elmsford while also connecting to the Westchester County Medical Center, a local jail, and Westchester Community College. Economic improvements of the parkway extension would include nearly 6,000 new jobs and over US$2 million ($10 million in 2025) in tax rebates. The fourth and final section of the Sprain Brook Parkway was opened on October 28, 1980, having cost $25 million in 1980 dollars ($98 million in 2025). The last section, deemed a 2.7 miles (4.3 km) long missing link, finished the parkway to its full length between the Bronx River Parkway and the traffic circle in Hawthorne. This new piece of the parkway was built with 70% of the required funds provided by the federal government, and was designed to redistribute traffic along different parkways, with NYSDOT estimating about 44,000 cars daily using the completed roadway.

The effects of the completion of the parkway were nearly immediate. Traffic on the Saw Mill River Parkway lessened with the new parkway, along with a 20% reduction on the Taconic State Parkway. However, while the route south of the Sprain Brook was seeing less traffic, the portion north of Hawthorne to Campfire Road, a 5 miles (8.0 km) section, was seeing much more traffic with the new parkway. Proposals for solving this problem included a $50 million ($167 million in 2025) proposal to widen the Taconic State Parkway to six lanes. NY 9A south of Hawthorne also saw a considerable reduction in traffic and an improvement in the corridor north of NY 100C, becoming more of a commercial center. New industrial parks and office parks were being constructed within a couple years of completion of the new parkway along NY 9A.

== Exit list ==
The entire route is in Westchester County. All exits are unnumbered.

Location	mi	km	Destinations	Notes
Yonkers	0.00	0.00	Bronx River Parkway south to Cross County Parkway – The Bronx	Southern terminus
Yonkers	0.88	1.42	NY 100 (Central Park Avenue)	Same-directional access only; Central Park Avenue signed as Central Avenue
Yonkers	1.33	2.14	Tuckahoe Road / Ridge Hill Boulevard – Yonkers	
Ardsley	4.00	6.44	Jackson Avenue	
Greenburgh	7.60	12.23	NY 100B – Greenburgh, Ardsley	
Elmsford	8.91	14.34	I-287 (Cross Westchester Expressway) – Tappan Zee Bridge, White Plains	No southbound access to I-287 west; exit 3 on I-287; former I-487
Greenburgh–Mount Pleasant line	10.39	16.72	NY 100C – Eastview	
Hawthorne			NY 100 / Hospital Road – Hawthorne	Northbound exit and southbound entrance; serves Westchester Medical Center
Hawthorne	11.20	18.02	NY 100 – Hawthorne	No northbound exit
Hawthorne	12.65	20.36	Taconic State Parkway north to Saw Mill River Parkway north – Albany, Brewster	Northern terminus; exit 2 on Taconic State Parkway
1.000 mi = 1.609 km; 1.000 km = 0.621 mi: Incomplete access

== See also ==
- Parkways in New York State
