= Spanish American War Monument to the 71st Infantry Regiment =

War memorial in Westchester, New York

- U.S. National Register of Historic Places
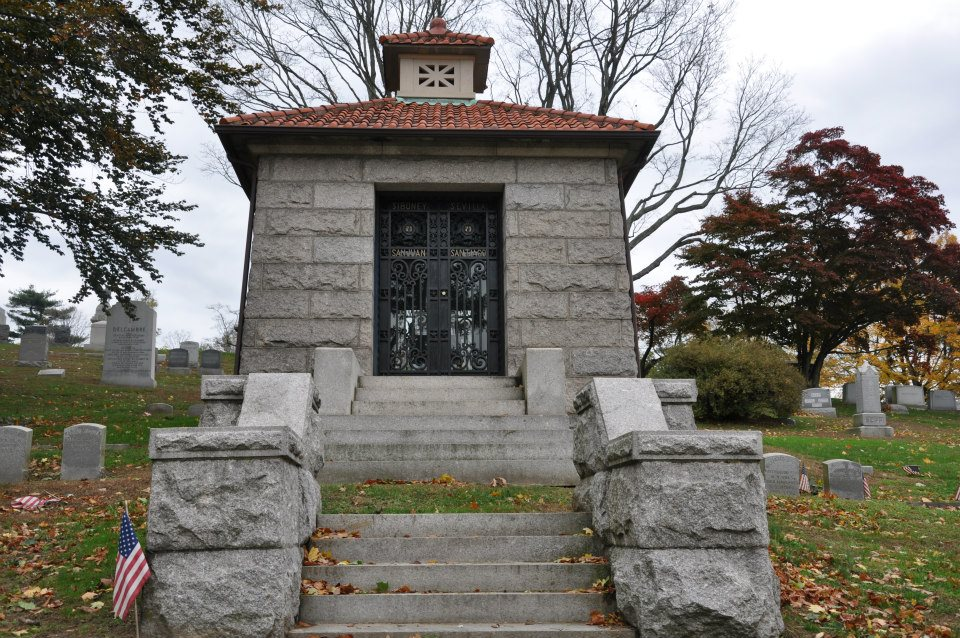

- Location within New York Location within the United States
- Location: Jackson Avenue & Saw Mill River Road, Greenburgh, New York
- Coordinates: 41°00′38″N 73°51′50″W
- Area: less than one acre
- Built: 1901, 1905
- Architectural style: Neoclassical
- NRHP reference No.: 10001133
- Added to NRHP: January 14, 2011

Spanish American War Monument to the 71st Infantry Regiment is a historic war memorial located in Mount Hope Cemetery at Greenburgh, Westchester County, New York. It was built in 1901 at the 71st Infantry Regiment burial plot, and is an 18 feet square and 18 feet high, Quincy granite structure in the Neoclassical style. It has granite steps, wrought and cast iron double entrance doors, and a square cupola. A second set of steps was built in 1905.

It was added to the National Register of Historic Places in 2011.

== See also ==
- National Register of Historic Places listings in southern Westchester County, New York
