= Grassy Sprain Reservoir =

- Location within New York Location within the United States
- Location: Yonkers, Westchester County, New York
- Coordinates: 40°58′18″N 73°51′4″W
- Type: reservoir
- Catchment area: 1.91 sq mi (4.9 km^{2})
- Basin countries: United States
- Surface area: 150 acres (61 ha)
- Water volume: 2,900 acre⋅ft (3,600,000 m^{3})
- Surface elevation: 130 ft (40 m)

The Grassy Sprain Reservoir is a 150-acre (61 ha) storage reservoir in northern Yonkers, New York. It was completed in 1876 by the City of Yonkers as the city's main storage reservoir. The reservoir was formed by the Grassy Sprain Brook Dam which impounded the Sprain Brook River and Grassy Sprain River. The reservoir itself has a maximum capacity of 2,900 acre-feet (3,600,000 m^{3}), and water from the reservoir is sent to a water filtration plant prior to civil consumption.

The Grassy Sprain Brook Dam is earthen, 40 feet (12 m) high, 600 feet (180 m) long and drains an area of 1.91 square miles (4.9 km^{2}). In 1919 the City of Yonkers, which at that time had about 100,000 residents, estimated that the reservoir capacity would supply the city for 85 days.

== See also ==
- List of reservoirs and dams in New York
