= Elmsford, New York =

- Village
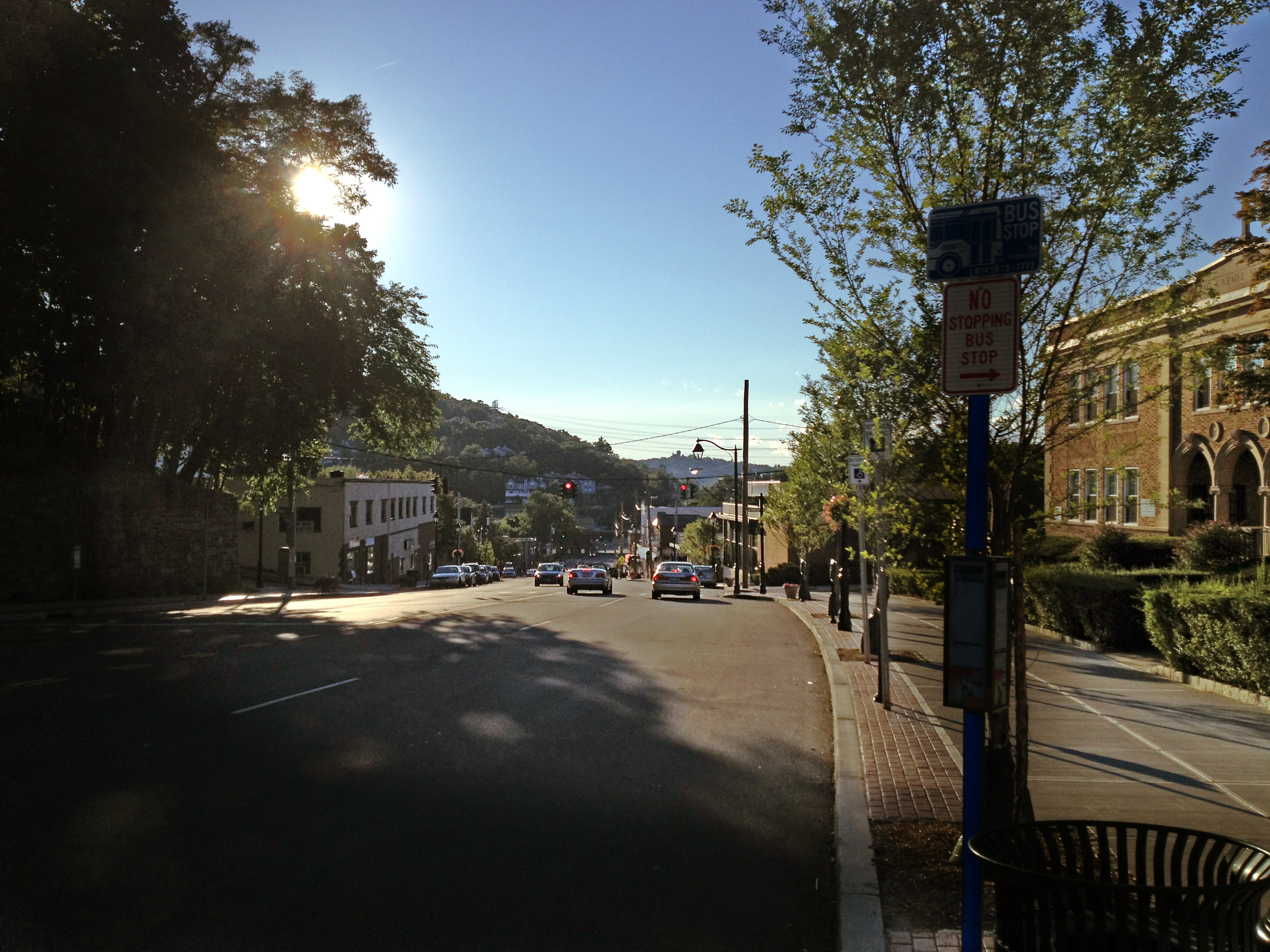
- Main Street (looking west)

- Seal

- Location of Elmsford, New York
- Coordinates: 41°3′14″N 73°48′57″W
- Country: United States
- State: New York
- County: Westchester
- Town: Greenburgh

Area
  - Total: 1.06 sq mi (2.74 km^{2})
  - Land: 1.06 sq mi (2.74 km^{2})
  - Water: 0 sq mi (0.00 km^{2})
- Elevation: 177 ft (54 m)

Population (2020)
  - Total: 5,239
  - Density: 4,957.4/sq mi (1,914.07/km^{2})
- Time zone: UTC-5 (Eastern (EST))
  - Summer (DST): UTC-4 (EDT)
- ZIP code: 10523
- Area code: 914
- FIPS code: 36-24295
- GNIS feature ID: 0949586
- Website: https://www.elmsford.gov/

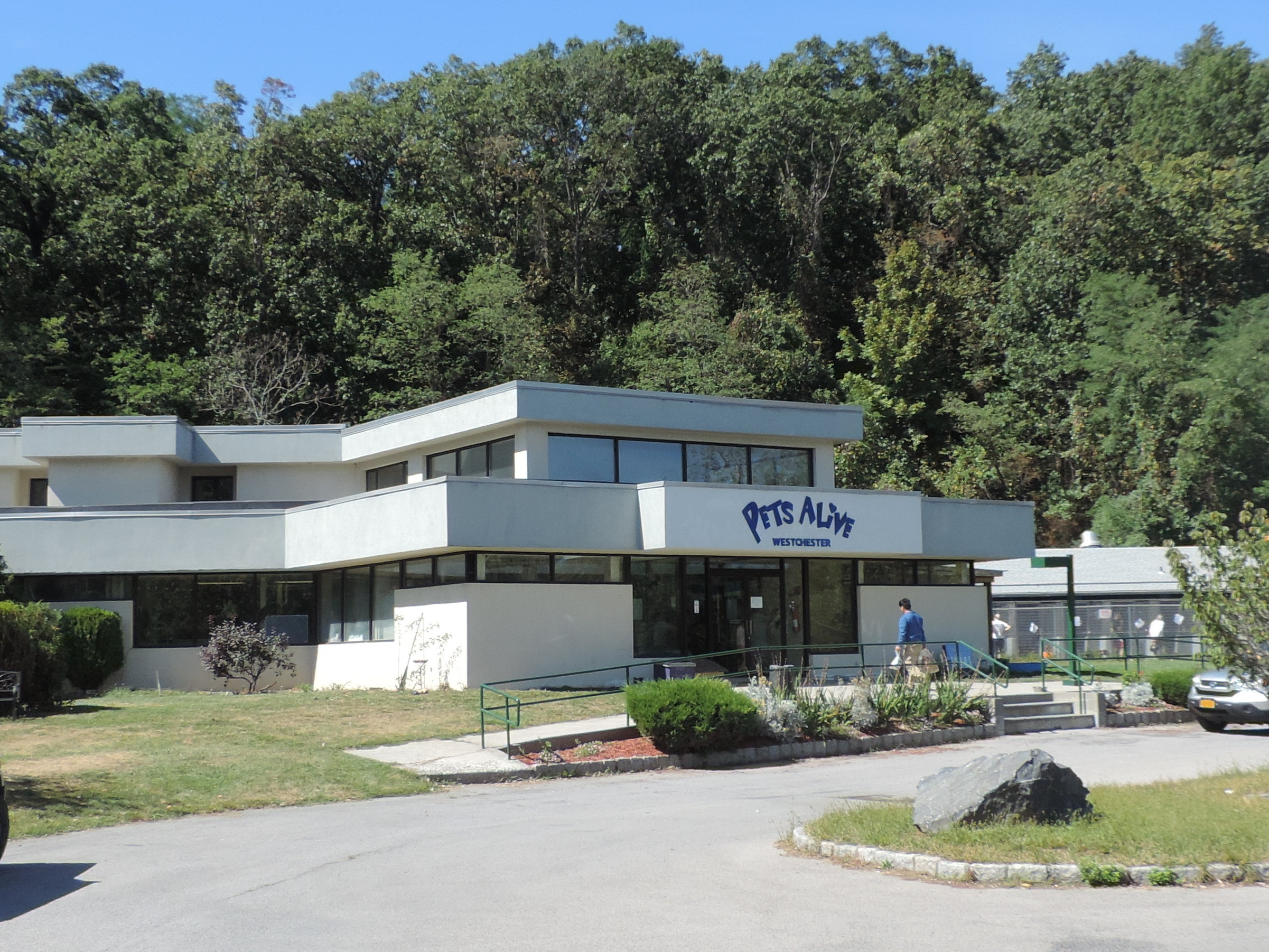
Animal shelter

Elmsford is a village in Westchester County, New York, United States. It is part of the New York metropolitan area. Roughly one square mile, the village is fully contained within the borders of the town of Greenburgh. As of the 2020 census, Elmsford had a population of 5,239.

== History ==
Elmsford was largely farmland throughout its early history. The construction of railroads in the late 19th century brought new prominence to the area, and in 1910 it was incorporated as a village.

The area was known from colonial times as "Storm's Bridge" and later, "Hall's Corners", names derived from the principal landowners of the times. In 1870, the growing village was officially renamed "Elmsford" in honor of a local landmark, a giant elm tree which no longer exists. The names Elmsford and Storm's Bridge are reminders of the nearby Saw Mill River, which once had significant tributaries flowing through the village.

A longstanding legend holds that Elmsford is the birthplace of the term "cocktail". According to the tale, a local colonial tavern (sometimes said to be established by town father Isaac Storm) had run out of wooden stirrers during the war and started using the quills of roosters' tailfeathers to stir their drinks; a more embellished version holds that the roosters were plundered from nearby Tory farmers.

Much of Elmsford developed around the New York and Putnam Railroad station, with train service beginning in the 1870s. Commuter rail service ended in 1958, and freight service ended in 1975. The railroad bed is now the South County Trailway and North County Trailway. The train station building is now a restaurant.

The Elmsford Reformed Church and Cemetery was listed on the National Register of Historic Places in 1983.

== Geography ==
Elmsford is located at 41°3′14″N 73°48′57″W (41.053963, -73.815711) in Westchester County, NY. According to the United States Census Bureau, the village has a total area of 1.1 square miles (2.8 km^{2}), all land.

== Government ==
Elmsford's government comprises a mayor and four trustees. The board and mayor also employ a professional village manager.

Current Mayor: Robert Williams

== Fire Department ==
The Village of Elmsford is protected by the all-volunteer Elmsford Fire Department, which consists of two fire companies each occupying their own firehouses, Live Oak Engine Company, operating two fire engines, and Elmsford Fire Company #1, operating a quint and a tower ladder. Emergency Medical Services are provided by the village-operated Elmsford EMS, which provides BLS services, and the Town of Greenburgh EMS which provides ALS-paramedic service when requested.

=== Fire station locations and apparatus ===
Company	Engine	Ladder	Special Unit	Ambulance	Address
Live Oak Engine Company #1	Engine 137, Engine 237			58B1, 58B2	5 N. Lawn Avenue
Elmsford Fire Company #1		Ladder 55, Tower Ladder 21	Utility 86		144 E. Main Street

== Police Department ==
The Elmsford Police Department, created with the incorporation of the village in 1910, is currently located in the same building as Village Hall, and provides round the clock police protection to the village. It currently employs 22 sworn personnel.

== Transportation ==
The village was once served by the New York and Putnam Railroad. Passenger service ceased in 1958. The Elmsford train station, located on Saw Mill River Road (near the intersection with Route 119) is still standing and now houses a restaurant. The closest Metro-North Railroad stations are Tarrytown (on the Hudson Line) to the west and White Plains (on the Harlem Line) to the east.

Several routes of the Bee-Line Bus System pass through the village.

== Features ==
Elmsford's road system connects to numerous major highways and thoroughfares, including Interstate 287, the Saw Mill River Parkway, the Sprain Brook Parkway and Route 9A; the North County Trailway and South County Trailway bicycle paths terminate there. Convenient to White Plains, Yonkers, New York City, and Connecticut, the village is a significant center of commercial traffic and distribution. It is home to the large Local 456 of the Teamsters union.

The village's public schools are run by the Elmsford Board of Education and include Dixson Primary, Alice E. Grady Elementary and Alexander Hamilton Junior/Senior High School. The village is also home to the private Roman Catholic elementary school Our Lady of Mount Carmel, which is affiliated with the Catholic parish of the same name and which was established in 1929.

Dedicated in 1996, Carol Nichols Park has facilities for softball, basketball, tennis as well as a gated "kiddie park" and Sprinkler Park (attendant) for small children.

The town has had an animal shelter since the 1930s. In 1995 the shelter, Central Westchester Humane Society, moved to a location on Warehouse Lane South. The shelter was replaced by Pets Alive Westchester, and later Paws Crossed Animal Rescue, the current owner.

The Westchester Broadway Theater was a professional dinner theater venue established in Elmsford in 1974. The theater closed permanently in October 2020 due to financial hardships caused by the ongoing COVID-19 pandemic.

== Education ==
Most of Elmsford is in Elmsford Union Free School District while a portion is in Greenburgh Central School District.

== Demographics ==
Historical population
Census	Pop.	Note	%±
1920	1,535		—
1930	2,935		91.2%
1940	3,078		4.9%
1950	3,147		2.2%
1960	3,795		20.6%
1970	3,911		3.1%
1980	3,361		−14.1%
1990	3,938		17.2%
2000	4,676		18.7%
2010	4,664		−0.3%
2020	5,239		12.3%
U.S. Decennial Census

=== 2020 census ===
As of the 2020 census, Elmsford had a population of 5,239. The median age was 36.5 years. 19.3% of residents were under the age of 18 and 12.4% of residents were 65 years of age or older. For every 100 females there were 100.7 males, and for every 100 females age 18 and over there were 99.2 males age 18 and over.

100.0% of residents lived in urban areas, while 0.0% lived in rural areas.

There were 1,813 households in Elmsford, of which 37.0% had children under the age of 18 living in them. Of all households, 46.6% were married-couple households, 19.2% were households with a male householder and no spouse or partner present, and 25.8% were households with a female householder and no spouse or partner present. About 21.6% of all households were made up of individuals and 6.0% had someone living alone who was 65 years of age or older.

There were 1,944 housing units, of which 6.7% were vacant. The homeowner vacancy rate was 1.2% and the rental vacancy rate was 7.7%.

Racial composition as of the 2020 census
Race	Number	Percent
White	1,454	27.8%
Black or African American	996	19.0%
American Indian and Alaska Native	94	1.8%
Asian	594	11.3%
Native Hawaiian and Other Pacific Islander	0	0.0%
Some other race	1,348	25.7%
Two or more races	753	14.4%
Hispanic or Latino (of any race)	2,290	43.7%

=== 2010 census ===
As of the 2010 census, there were 4,664 people, 1,618 households, and 1,101 families residing in the village. The population density was 4,306 inhabitants per square mile (1,663/km^{2}). There were 1,618 housing units at an average density of 1,585.9 per square mile (612.3/km^{2}).

Of the village's households, 32.0% had children under the age of 18 living with them, 47.5% were married couples living together, 13.2% had a female householder with no husband present, and 32.0% were non-families. 25.5% of all households were made up of individuals, and 6.8% had someone living alone who was 65 years of age or older. The average household size was 2.88 and the average family size was 3.39.

The village population was spread out, with 22.1% under the age of 18, 12.8% from 18 to 24, 33.5% from 25 to 44, 24.4% from 45 to 64, and 10.8% who were 65 years of age or older. The median age was 35.1 years. Males made up 50.9% of the population while women made up 49.1% of the population.

The racial makeup of the village was 46.4% White, 20.5% African American, 0.6% Native American, 10.5% Asian, 0% Pacific Islander, 18.0% from other races, and 4.1% from two or more races. Hispanic or Latino of any race were 38.0% of the population.

=== Income and poverty ===
The median income for a household in the village was $74,069, and the median income for a family was $84,698. Males had a median income of $43,649 versus $41,356 for females. The per capita income for the village was $32,448. About 8.58% of families and 10.86% of the population were below the poverty line.

== Notable people ==
- Isaac Van Wart (1762–1828), Revolutionary War hero
- The Turnesa brothers: Joe (1901-1991), Mike (1907-2000), Doug (1909-1972), Jim (1912-1971), and Willie Turnesa (1914-2001), professional and amateur golfers
- Giancarlo Esposito (b. 1958), actor
- Donovan Mitchell (b. 1996), professional basketball player

== Popular culture ==
- A scene in the movie Freedomland (2006) was shot at the Red Fox Diner on Rte. 9A in Elmsford.
- A scene in the movie 8mm (1999) was shot outside the Elmsford Motel on Rte. 119.
- A scene in the movie Disconnect (2012) was shot at the Saw Mill River Motel next to the Saw Mill River Parkway.
