= Foster Memorial AME Zion Church =

Historic church in New York, United States

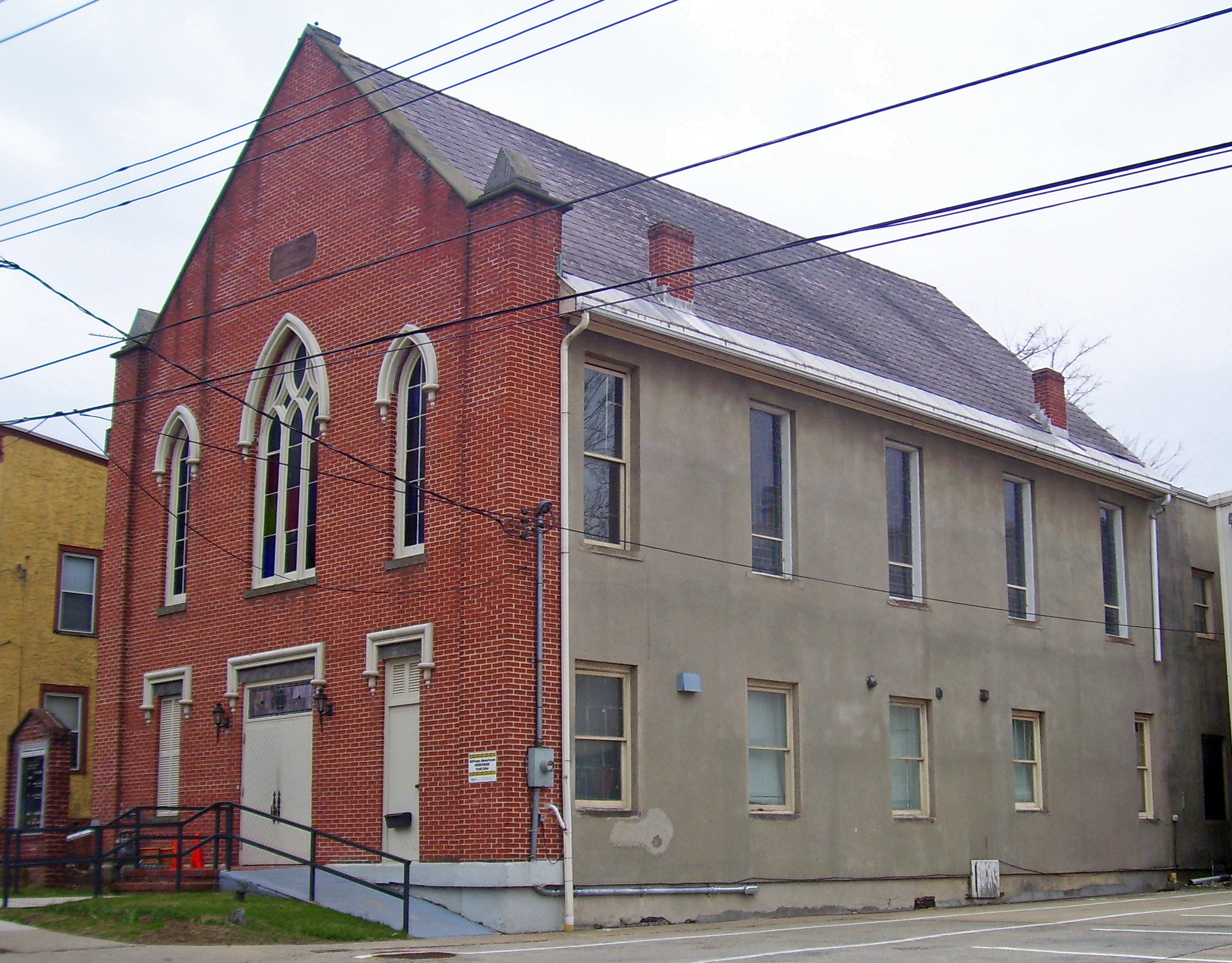
- Front elevation and west profile of church, 2008

Religion
- Affiliation: African Methodist Episcopal Zion Church

Location
- Location: Tarrytown, New York, USA
- Interactive map of Foster Memorial AME Zion Church
- Coordinates: 41°04′46″N 73°51′50″W

Architecture
- Architect: James Bird
- Groundbreaking: 1864
- Completed: 1865
- Construction cost: $9,120.85

Specifications
- Direction of façade: North
- Materials: Brick

U.S. National Register of Historic Places
- Added to NRHP: 1982
- NRHP Reference no.: 82003414

Website
- Foster Memorial Church NPS

The Foster Memorial AME Zion Church is located on Wildey Street in Tarrytown, New York, United States. Formed in 1860, it is the oldest Black church in Westchester County and possibly one of the oldest in the state. During the Civil War it was a stop on the Underground Railroad and was known as the “Freedom Church." One of the church's founders was herself an escaped slave, as were many parishioners. They helped slaves either continue to Canada or settle in Tarrytown if they wished. The church has played a major role in Tarrytown's African-American community ever since.

The church's brick building, designed by local architect James Bird, was opened in 1865. It was added to the National Register of Historic Places in 1982.

== Building ==
The church is a three-by-four-bay building two storeys high. The red brick of its surface is only visible on the facade and is elsewhere covered by an artificial stone veneer. The gable roof is likewise of imitation slate. Pilasters on the front flanks support triangular granite capstones. A cinder block addition is on the rear.

Inside, the first floor is devoted to offices, a kitchen and large meeting room. The sanctuary is on the second floor, entered from the north with the altar and podium to the south. On either side are marble tablets commemorating founders Henry Foster and Henry Brown.

== History ==
The first AME Zion congregation in Westchester was established in New Rochelle in 1837, with a White Plains group following six years later. In 1860, four members of the latter congregation from Tarrytown decided to organize locally. They were Henry Foster, a barber, his wife Amanda, their friend Hiram Jimerson and The Rev. Jacob Thomas.

At first the four founders and three more local members met in whatever space they could borrow. They began in the room over Amanda Taylor's popular local confectionery. As the congregation began to grow, they moved to another store and then a shoe factory. Finally, with the assistance of white members of the local Dutch Reformed and Methodist congregations, the new church formed a committee to find and purchase land for a church of its own.

Local builder and architect James Bird contributed the design, and the cornerstone was laid in October 1864. Henry Foster died the next year, urging his wife to continue the church's development as he expected a large-scale migration of freed slaves from the South after the end of the war. While that did not happen initially, Amanda Foster would continue to play a major role in the church's development and is today revered as the "Mother of the Church".

After a construction expenditure of $9,120.85 (~$145,980 in 2024), the church opened in 1865. As was typical of the time, the cost was partly defrayed by charging for the pews, in this case an annual rent of $3. In lean economic times, the congregants practiced "pounding" their pastor, each member bringing him and his family a pound of food when the church could not afford to pay him. The church grew slowly, including some whites, numbering 40 members by 1886.

Amanda Foster died in 1904 at the age of 98. The wave of Black Southerners that her husband had anticipated finally materialized in the years afterwards, and during the Great Migration the church served as a community center for new arrivals in the Tarrytown area, helping them acclimate to an urban lifestyle.

The 20th century saw the first physical alterations to the church building, as its limited finances in turn limited what could be done to stave off deterioration. In the 1930s the original roof was replaced. The Meadowstone coating was applied to the sides and rear in the 1950s. The following decade the rear wing was added, expanding the available space in both the sanctuary and meeting room, and the original minister's apartment was converted into an auditorium. Pastor Madison McRae continued the church's activist traditions, leading protests against housing discrimination and persuading the Tarrytown Fire Department to hire more African-Americans.

=== DMX ===
In January 2026, the church was announced as the initial venue for a posthumous ministerial ordination ceremony honoring the late rapper and Westchester County native Earl "DMX" Simmons. Organized by the Gospel Cultural Center and presided over by Bishop Osiris Imhotep, the service was intended to recognize DMX's lifelong Christian faith and the spiritual themes that he expressed in his music and public prayers. However, shortly before the scheduled January 10 event, regional leadership of the A.M.E. Zion Church denied the use of the church, following a social media post shared by DJ Envy of The Breakfast Club that showed Deacon Earl “DMX” Simmons in a ministerial robe and collar., resulting in the ordination being moved to Christ Episcopal Church elsewhere in Tarrytown.

== Legacy ==
This significant site was added to the African American Heritage Trail of Westchester County in 2004 as part of a mission to “preserve and interpret the legacy and contributions that people of African descent have made to the development of our unique American identity.” It is one of only 14 such sites.

== See also ==
- National Register of Historic Places listings in northern Westchester County, New York
