= Chris Moore (sportscaster) =

Sports radio announcer (born 1958)

- Born: 1958 (age 67–68); New York City, U.S.
- Education: Sleepy Hollow High School; Ithaca College
- Occupations: Radio sportscaster Radio personality
- Spouse: Pam Moore
- Children: 3

Chris Moore (born 1958) is an American sports broadcaster and radio personality who has done ice hockey play-by-play at both the college and NHL level, employed, respectively, by the University of Cornell, University of Wisconsin, New Jersey Devils, and Florida Panthers. Moore has also worked intermittently as a sports talk radio host at WFAN in New York City.

== Early life and career ==
Born in New York City in 1958, (Note: While it certainly appears to be the case that, as of January 1, 2026, no categorical statement to that effect—i.e. that Moore was born in the year 1958 (or, for that matter, any other year)—has yet been published, much less any specific birth date disclosed, it is also true that, among the few published age-as-of-date mentions, two specific ones—22 as of December 17, 1980, and 37, as of December 26, 1995 (the other being 30, as of August 31, 1988) —lead to the inescapable conclusion that the mere handful of possible non-1958 dates of birth for Chris Moore are contained within the less-than one week leading to—and including—New Year's Eve, 1957. (Incidental, but worthy of note, is the accompanying conclusion that Moore—whenever finding himself the subject of even a minimally comprehensive newspaper profile—has proven neither secretive nor shy about disclosing his own age.)) Moore spent his formative years in Tarrytown, where he attended Sleepy Hollow High School, graduating in 1976. He then attended Ithaca College in upstate New York, finishing in 1980.

=== Career ===
Close on the heels of college graduation came Moore's affiliation, circa fall 1980, with nearby Cornell University, replacing longtime "voice of Cornell hockey," Roy Ives, as the school's hockey, football and lacrosse play-by-play announcer on station WHCU, where he worked alongside Cornell graduate Pat Brown, as well as fellow Ithaca College alumnus Eric Reid.

In 1984, Moore beat out more than a 100 applicants to become the sports director at WTSO in Madison, Wisconsin, where he also provided the play-by-play for both football and hockey broadcasts. In 1988, when his first NHL opportunity presented itself, Moore was succeeded as sports director by Matt Lepay, whose recollections of that transition are recorded in the preface to his 2012 memoir, Why Not Wisconsin.

Within a few days, I received a call from Chris Moore, who was the station’s sports director, morning drive anchor, hockey announcer and, when needed, an all-around nut job who could crack up a room with his humor. [...] Chris is a very gifted broadcaster, and he is also funny as hell. He does a great Dick Vitale impression, and he had a number of other character voices that came in handy during his sports updates for WTSO and also WZEE (Z104), a highly rated Top 40 station. Chris was able to chase his dream of becoming an NHL broadcaster, and he left Madison for the New Jersey Devils. He later became the voice of the Florida Panthers. [...] He lives on the East Coast now, and his wife, Pam, is a successful attorney. Chris could tell Linda and I had reservations about moving to Wisconsin, and he went out of his way to make us feel comfortable. Maybe many of you have no idea who Chris Moore is, but I will say without hesitation that any success I have had in this business is in large part because of Chris. He discovered my demo tape and was very aggressive in giving a 26-year-old know-nothing a shot at calling major college basketball games.

During his mid-90s tenure as Florida Panthers play-by-play broadcaster, Moore coined the soon-to-be ubiquitous nickname of "Jovocop" for Panther defenseman Ed Jovanovski, reflecting the then-teenaged Jovanovski's crushingly physical style of play.

== Personal life ==
Since the late 1980s, Moore has been married to attorney Pamela Moore, who was attending law school in Syracuse when she first met the then-Cornell University play-by-play broadcaster. Their first child was born in March 1989, and their second, just over three years later. (Note: A three-weeks premature birth, which coincidentally afforded the 24-year-old Kenny Albert a roughly 33-years-prior precursor to his own 2025 hiring as New York Rangers play-by-play announcer on MSG, succeeding that team's longtime TV voice, Sam Rosen.) As of April 1999, the imminent arrival of child No. 3 precipitated a career-altering move—i.e. away from the "regular NHL play-by-play position"—Moore had been wrestling with for well over three years.

I am looking forward to living in Morristown, N.J., with my family 12 months a year. It's always tough to leave a job where you are treated so well. There's nothing about the Panthers job I don't like. That makes it hard. But other than that, it's not a hard decision. It's time to get home and be a better father and husband. I have a 10-year-old, a 7-year-old, and another child coming in June.
