= Norman Mingo =

American artist (1896–1980)

- Born: January 25, 1896
- Died: May 8, 1980 (aged 84); Tarrytown, New York, US
- Occupation: illustrator

Norman Theodore Mingo (January 25, 1896 – May 8, 1980) was an American commercial artist and illustrator. He is most famous for being commissioned to formalize the image of Alfred E. Neuman for Mad.

== Biography ==
A prolific magazine illustrator in the Norman Rockwell vein, Mingo resided in the Chicago area for decades before retiring to Tarrytown, New York. As a child, he won an art contest, receiving art materials and a correspondence course as a prize. Mingo had early professional success, even dropping out of high school for a year due to his workload. In the 1920s and early 1930s, he ran a Chicago ad studio whose staff included future Captain Marvel artist C. C. Beck; the studio closed during the Great Depression. Thereafter he worked largely as a freelancer, including as an illustrator for various advertising agencies and magazines, including The American Weekly, Ladies' Home Journal and Pictorial Review. He drew Hollywood paper doll books with oversized heads of actors such as Bette Davis, Deanna Durbin and Rita Hayworth. He provided a bikinied pin-up girl for a 1946 Mennen Skin Bracer advert, signed with his distinctive Mingo script. In addition to pin-up art, he also illustrated for paperbacks (Pocket Books), served as a traditional portraitist, painting such subjects as General George S. Patton Jr., and drew numerous movie posters including Gentlemen Prefer Blondes.

Alfred E. Neuman on Mad #30

In 1956, Mingo answered an ad in The New York Times for an illustrator ("National magazine wants portrait artist for special project"), and was selected by Mad publisher William Gaines and editor Al Feldstein to create a warmer, more polished version of a public domain character the magazine had been using. Previously, the magazine had printed a rougher image and re-drawings of the character, which were randomly dubbed "Melvin F. Coznowski" or "Mel Haney" in addition to "Alfred E. Neuman." The Panglossian simpleton had appeared in many guises and variations since the 19th century, including in dental advertisements that assured the public of minimal tooth-pulling pain. Mingo's initial painting was the first time Neuman had appeared in color.

Mad editor Al Feldstein recalled the day Mingo responded to the ad at the Mad offices:

In walked this little old guy in his sixties named Norman Mingo, and he said, "What national magazine is this?" I said "Mad", and he said, "Goodbye." I told him to wait, and I dragged out all these examples and postcards of this idiot kid, and I said, "I want a definitive portrait of this kid. I don't want him to look like an idiot; I want him to be loveable and have an intelligence behind his eyes. But I want him to have this devil-may-care attitude, someone who can maintain a sense of humor while the world is collapsing around him."

Permanently named "Alfred E. Neuman," the character became Mad magazine's mascot with issue #30. In November 2008, Mingo's original cover featuring the first "official" portrait of Neuman sold at auction for $203,150.

Norman Mingo painted eight Mad covers in 1956–57 before his more regular work with the top-tier Dancer Fitzgerald Sample advertising agency took up all of his time. Mingo had actually landed both jobs on the same day. While working exclusively in advertising, Mingo illustrated campaigns for a variety of companies including General Mills cereal, L&M cigarettes, Falstaff Beer and the U.S. Army.

During Mingo's absence, Kelly Freas rendered Neuman for Mad from 1958 to 1962. Mingo returned to Mad in 1962 and painted most of its front covers until 1976. Most of his Neuman images were a combination of watercolor and acrylics, but he occasionally experimented with different media. His last Mad cover appeared on issue #211 (December 1979). Mingo produced 97 Mad covers in total, plus over 100 additional cover images for Mad's many reprint Specials and its line of paperbacks. He also drew occasional Mad-related assignments for others, such as an Alfred-ized version of beleaguered New York City Mayor Abraham Beame in 1976 for The New York Times.

Mingo's Mad cover total surpassed Freas' in 1965, and his leading status endured until 2016, when current contributor Mark Fredrickson became the most prolific Mad cover artist with his 98th cover. Combining the regular issues (including some back covers), the reprint "MAD Specials" and the paperbacks, Mingo produced more than 200 original covers for Mad. Fellow cover artists Jack Rickard and Bob Jones have remarked that Mingo was the only one who could paint the Neuman character perfectly "on model" every time.

A born-again Christian, Mingo began signing his covers with the ichthys beneath his name in 1975, beginning with Mad #174. He attended the Second Reformed Church in Tarrytown, New York with his wife Margaret until her death in 1963.

In contrast to his usual rendering of the definitive Neuman face, Mingo created a dramatic variation in 1979, after the Three Mile Island accident. On the back cover of issue #210, with an exaggerated version of the plant's meltdown in the background, Alfred stands in front of cracking cooling towers, sweating and hair standing on end, and abandons his trademark grin for a grimace as he says, "YES...ME WORRY!".

60 years old when he took his first Mad cover assignment, Mingo was the oldest of the magazine's regulars to make his debut. He was also the only veteran of World War I ever to write or draw for Mad, having served three years in the Navy.

Mingo died on May 8, 1980, after a lengthy illness.
