= Mekeli =

Mekeli is a masculine given name. Notable people with the name include:

- Mekeli Ieremia (born 1954), an American former football player
- Mekeli Wesley (born 1979), a Fijian-Samoan former football player
