= Public Schools of the Tarrytowns =

School district in New York, United States

Union Free School District of the Tarrytowns, also known as Public Schools of the Tarrytowns, is a school district headquartered in Sleepy Hollow, New York.

The district includes most of Sleepy Hollow (within the Town of Mount Pleasant) and a portion of Tarrytown (within the Town of Greenburgh).

== History ==
Chris Borsari was superintendent until 2023. Ray Sanchez, who originated from Tarrytown, became the new superintendent that year. Sanchez lived his early life in the school district.

== Schools ==
- Sleepy Hollow High School
- Sleepy Hollow Middle School
- Washington Irving Intermediate School
- Winfield L. Morse School (Elementary school)
- John Paulding School (Pre-Kindergarten and Kindergarten)
- Tappan Hill Elementary School
