= Tarrytown, New York =

- Village
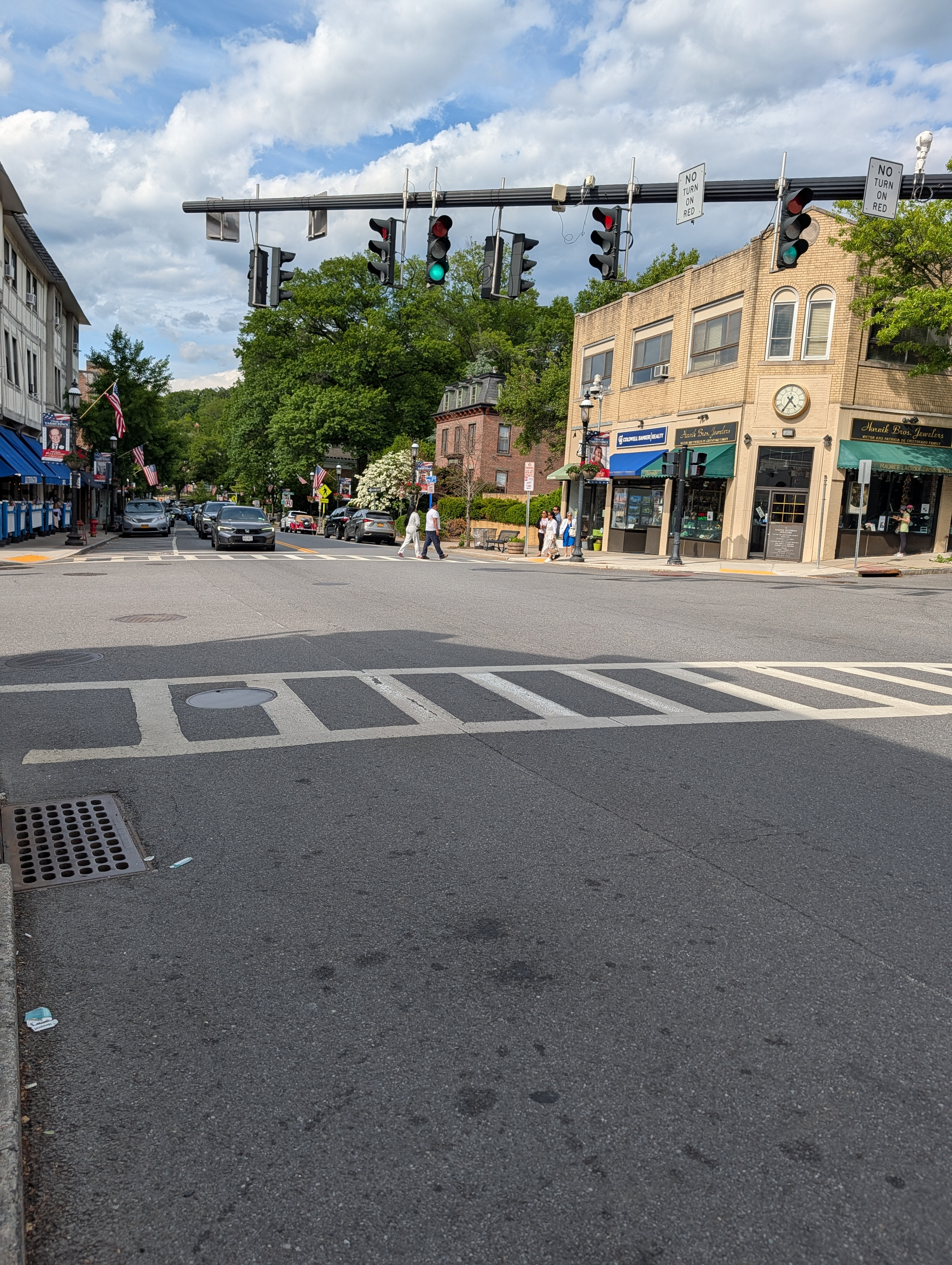
- Intersection of Broadway and Main Street in 2026.

- Seal

- Location of Tarrytown, New York
- Coordinates: 41°4′9″N 73°51′35″W
- Country: United States
- State: New York
- County: Westchester
- Town: Greenburgh
- Incorporated: 1870; 156 years ago

Area
  - Total: 5.69 sq mi (14.73 km^{2})
  - Land: 2.93 sq mi (7.60 km^{2})
  - Water: 2.75 sq mi (7.13 km^{2})
- Elevation: 121 ft (37 m)

Population (2020)
  - Total: 11,860
  - Density: 4,039.9/sq mi (1,559.82/km^{2})
- Time zone: UTC-5 (EST)
  - Summer (DST): UTC-4 (EDT)
- ZIP Code: 10591
- Area code: 914
- FIPS code: 36-73176
- GNIS feature ID: 0967065
- Website: www.tarrytownny.gov

Tarrytown is a village in the town of Greenburgh in Westchester County, New York, United States, in the New York metropolitan area. It is located on the eastern bank of the Hudson River, approximately 25 miles (40 km) north of Midtown Manhattan in New York City, and is served by a stop on the Metro-North Hudson Line. To the north of Tarrytown is the village of Sleepy Hollow (formerly North Tarrytown). The Tappan Zee Bridge (officially, Mario Cuomo Bridge) crosses the Hudson River at Tarrytown, carrying the New York State Thruway (Interstates 87 and 287) to South Nyack, Rockland County and points in Upstate New York. The population was 11,860 at the 2020 census.

Historically, the name "Tarrytown" was applied to a wider area around the village, including the neighboring communities of what is now Sleepy Hollow, Pocantico Hills, and Eastview; Sleepy Hollow was once considered a suburb of Tarrytown.

== History ==
=== Early history ===
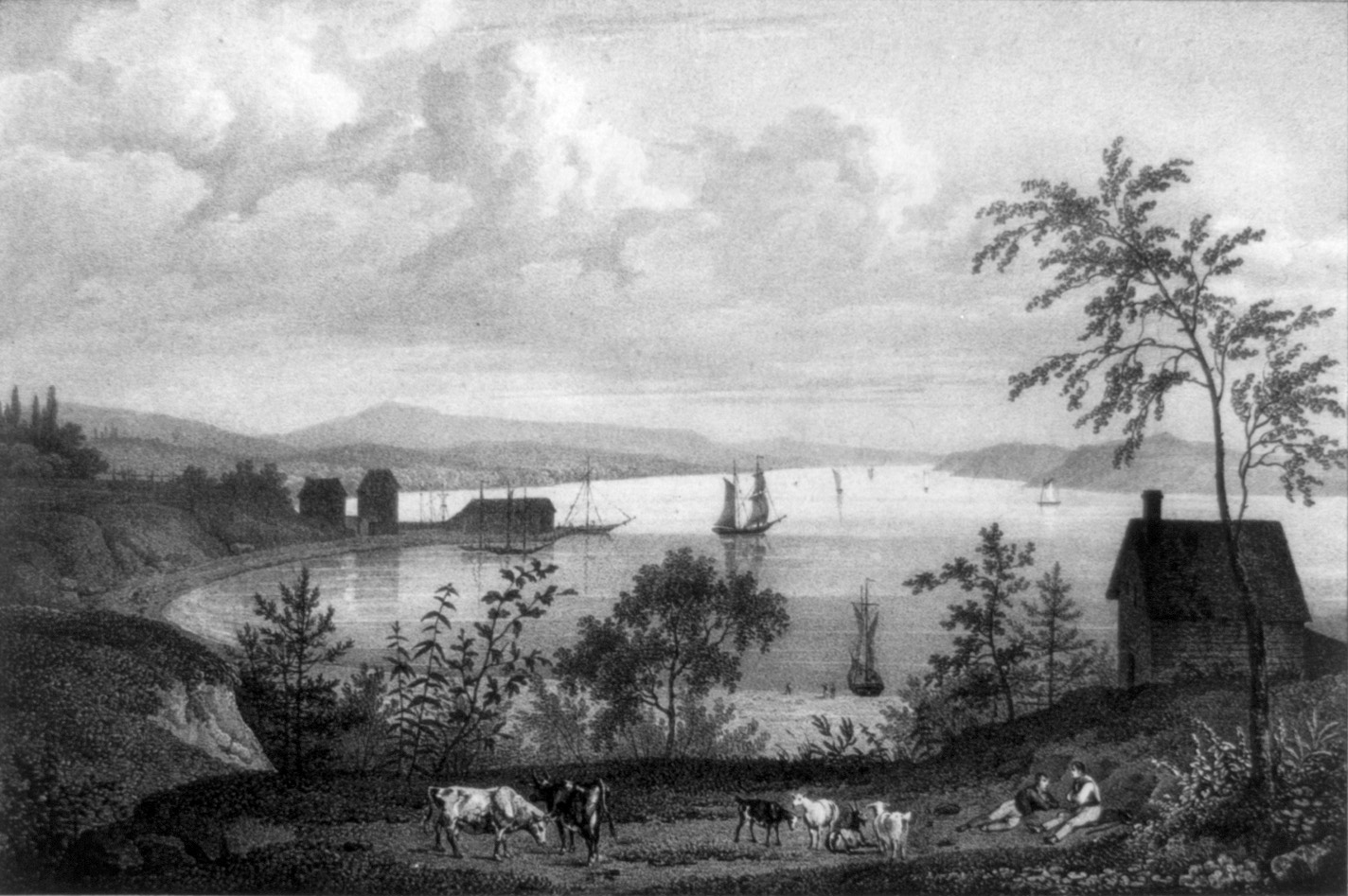
Illustration of Tarrytown c. 1828

The Native American Wecquaesgeek band of the Wappinger people, related to the Mohicans, lived in the area prior to European settlement. The Wecquaesgeek fished the Hudson River for shad, oysters and other shellfish. Their settlement in present-day Tarrytown was most probably at what is now the foot of Church Street near the Hudson River shore, at a place they called Alipconk (also spelled Alipconck) or the "Place of Elms".

The first European settlers of Tarrytown were Dutch farmers, fur trappers, and fishermen. Records show that the first Dutch residence in Tarrytown was built in 1645; however, the exact location of this residence is not known. Tarrytown sits within the lands of the former Dutch Colony of New Netherland which fell under English rule in 1674 with the signing of the Treaty of Westminster. The name may come from the Dutch tarwe, meaning "wheat". The land that became the village of Tarrytown was part of the massive Philipsburg Manor. The manor's tenant farmers grew wheat, which was by far the most valuable crop grown in colonial New York. Another view holds that the village is named for John Tarry, an early settler from Long Island.

=== Revolutionary War period ===
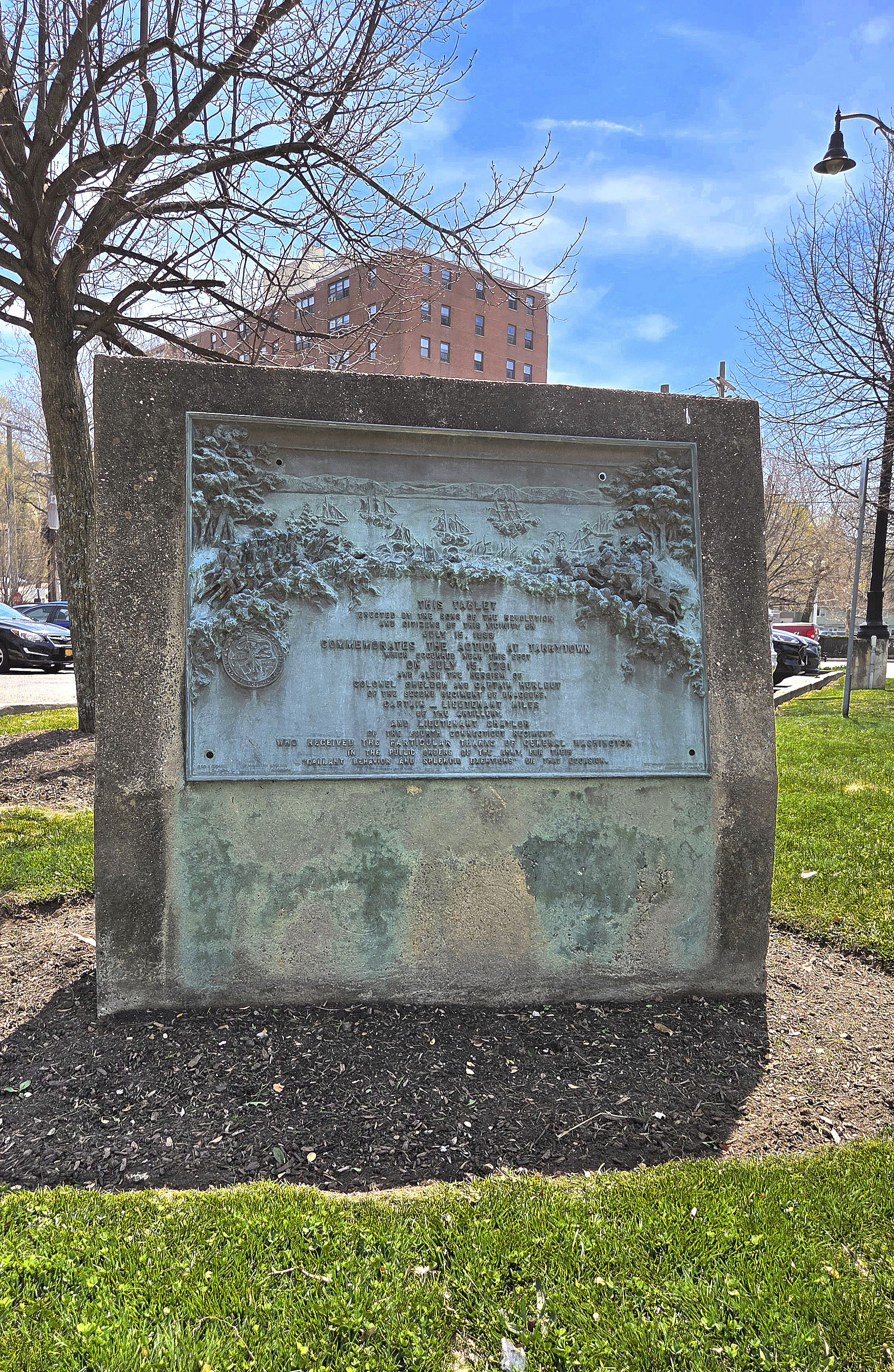
"The Action at Tarrytown" commemorative plaque near Tarrytown Station (Note: In the 1780s, the spot where the memorial tablet is located was roughly 200 feet out into the Hudson River; the station and the area around it were built on land reclaimed from the river in the 1840s during the construction of the Hudson River Railroad.)

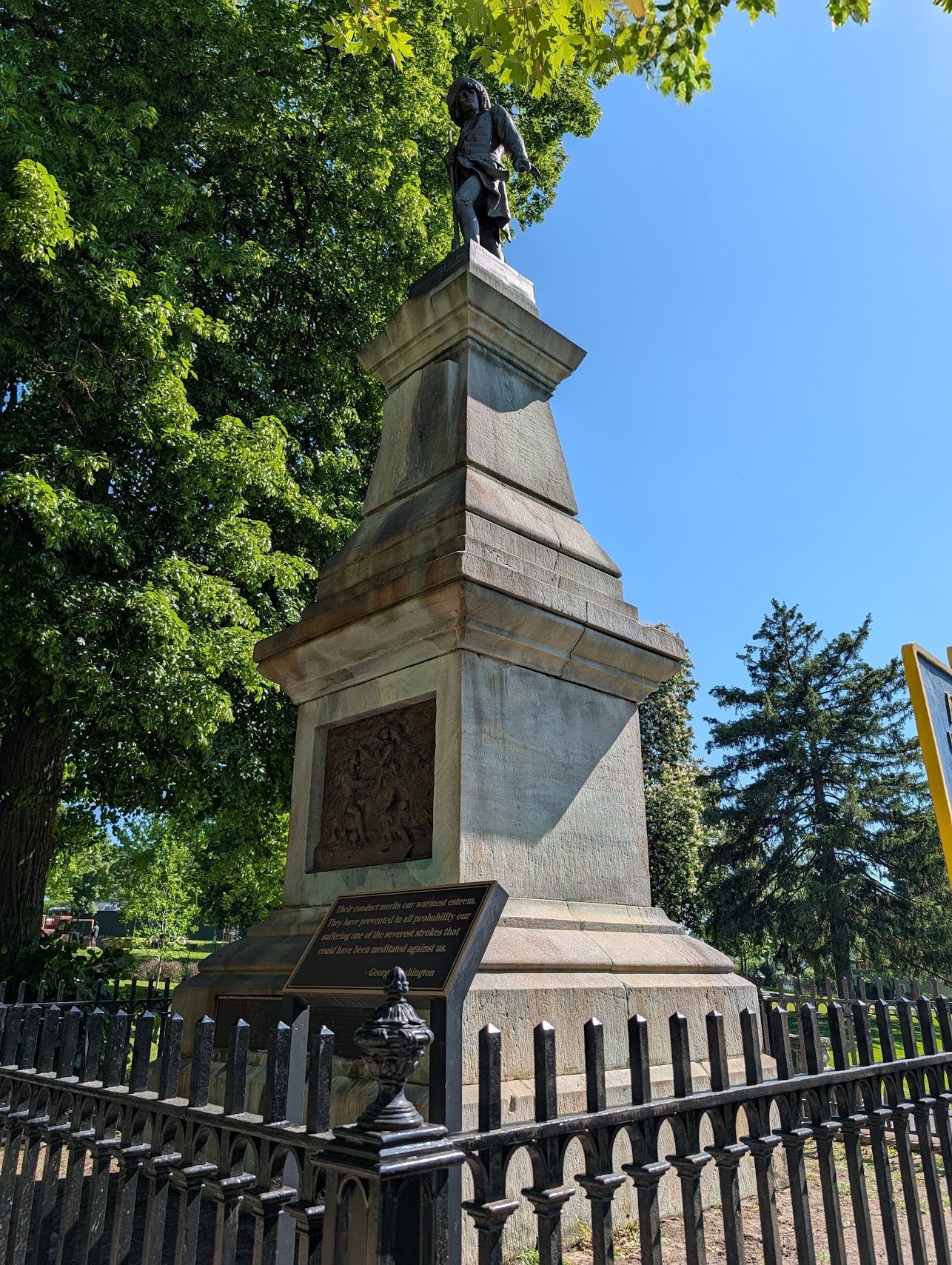
Monument on the site of John André's capture in what is now Patriot's Park

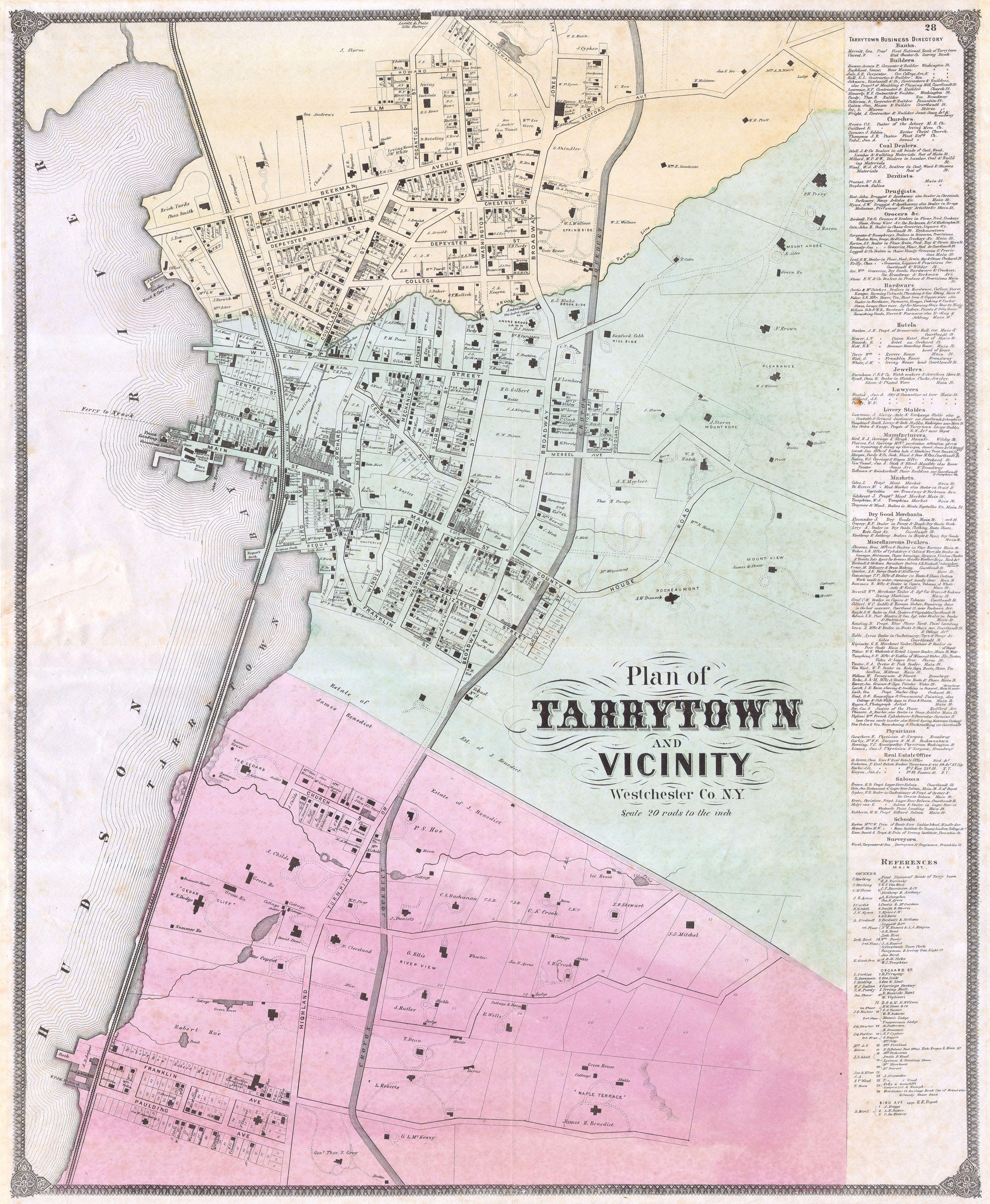
1868 map of Tarrytown and Beekman Town from Frederick W. Beers's Atlas of New York and Vicinity

During the American Revolutionary War, Tarrytown was situated within the Neutral Ground of Westchester County, an unprotected buffer zone between British-controlled territory to the south and American lines to the north. Lacking formal military protection, residents were vulnerable to devastating raids from both sides. Many left the area, many others joined the Westchester County Militia and served as crucial scouts, guides, and foragers for the Continental Army in the neutral ground, knowing the terrain well. The Old Dutch Burying Ground, the area's oldest cemetery, holds one of the highest concentrations of Revolutionary War veteran graves in the state of New York.

On August 4, 1776, two British warships taking part in the British invasion of New York City, HMS Phoenix and HMS Rose, repulsed the assault of an improvised American fleet of row galleys and a whaleboat near Tarrytown.

In 1780, in a famous incident, British intelligence officer Major John André was arrested in Tarrytown, which exposed the plans of American defector Benedict Arnold, whom Andre had met with several days earlier. André was traveling south through the village on the Albany Post Road when he was stopped and searched by three local militiamen, David Williams, John Paulding, and Isaac Van Wart. When suspicious papers were found in his boot, he was arrested as a spy. These papers proved to be the plans to West Point, which Arnold had given to Andre to be passed to the British command. Andre was tried for espionage, convicted and hanged. A circumstantial account of André's capture by militiamen was written in 1903 by the local historian and publisher of the Tarrytown Argus, Marcius D. Raymond.

On the night of July 15, 1781, a significant encounter known as The Action at Tarrytown took place in Tarrytown's Hudson River harbor. That night, a French unit from the Soissonnais Regiment, reinforced by American troops of the 2nd Continental Light Dragoons, successfully repelled British ships attacking American supply sloops anchored at Tarrytown. It was the first combined combat operation of the Franco-American alliance in the Revolutionary War.

George Washington visited Tarrytown on multiple occasions, both as Commander of the Continental Army during the Revolutionary War and later as President of the United States.

The writer Washington Irving first came to Tarrytown in 1798, sent there by his parents to stay with a friend during the yellow fever outbreak in New York City. He would return many times and eventually settle in the area, at Sunnyside. Irving later described Tarrytown in The Legend of Sleepy Hollow (1820). Irving began his story, "In the bosom of one of those spacious coves which indent the eastern shore of the Hudson, at that broad expansion of the river denominated by the ancient Dutch navigators of the Tappan Zee, and where they always prudently shortened sail and implored the protection of St. Nicholas when they crossed, there lies a small market town or rural port which by some is called Greenburgh, but which is more generally and properly known by the name of Tarry Town. This name was given, we are told, in former days, by the good housewives of the adjacent country, from the inveterate propensity of their husbands to linger about the village tavern on market days." (Note: Some have actually taken Irving's "derivation" of the name Tarrytown seriously, while it is clearly a joke. For discussion, see: Steiner, Henry (1998). The Place Names of Historic Sleepy Hollow & Tarrytown. Heritage Books. p. 138. ISBN 978-0-7884-0961-5.)

=== 19th century ===
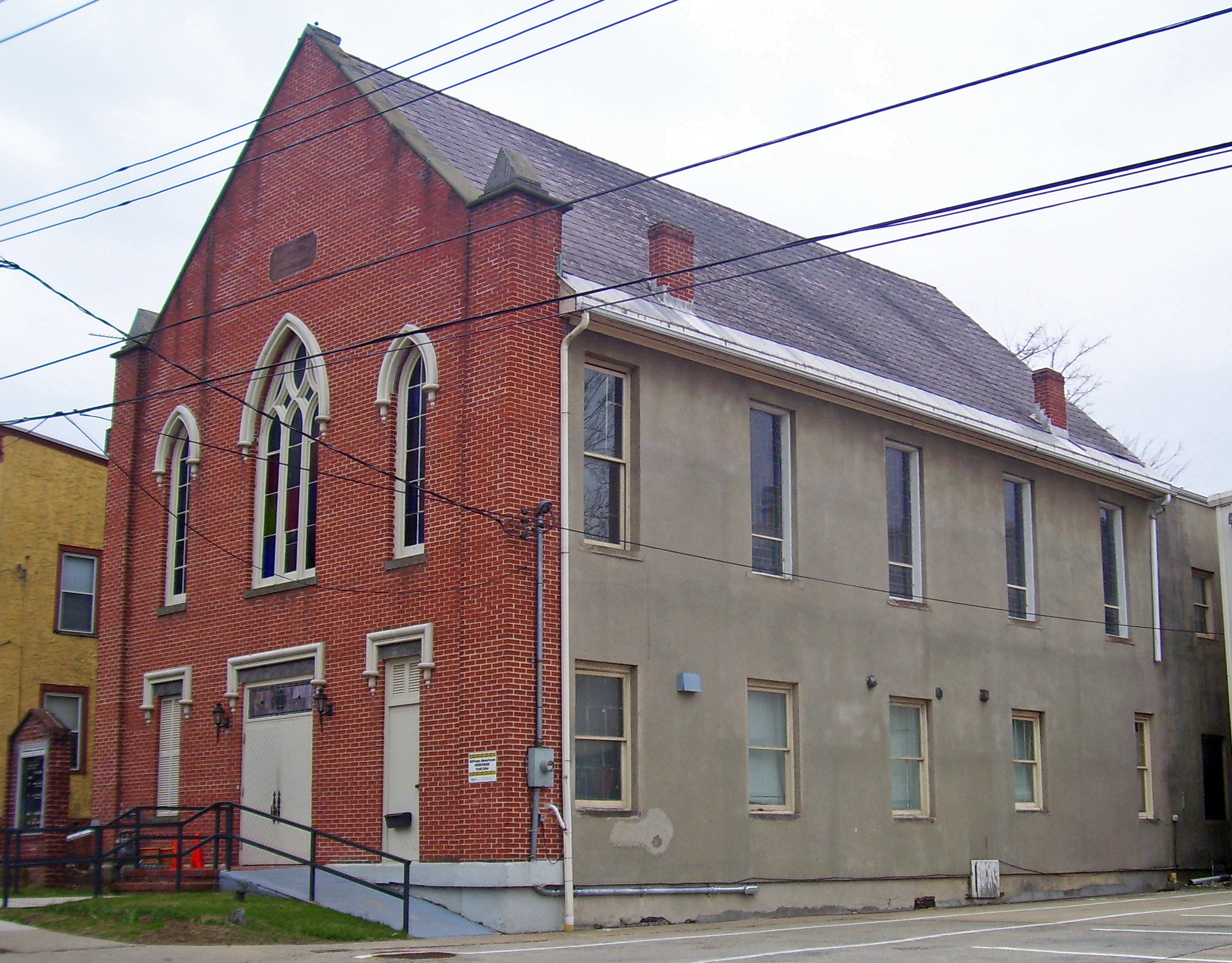
Foster Memorial AME Zion Church, oldest Black church in Westchester County

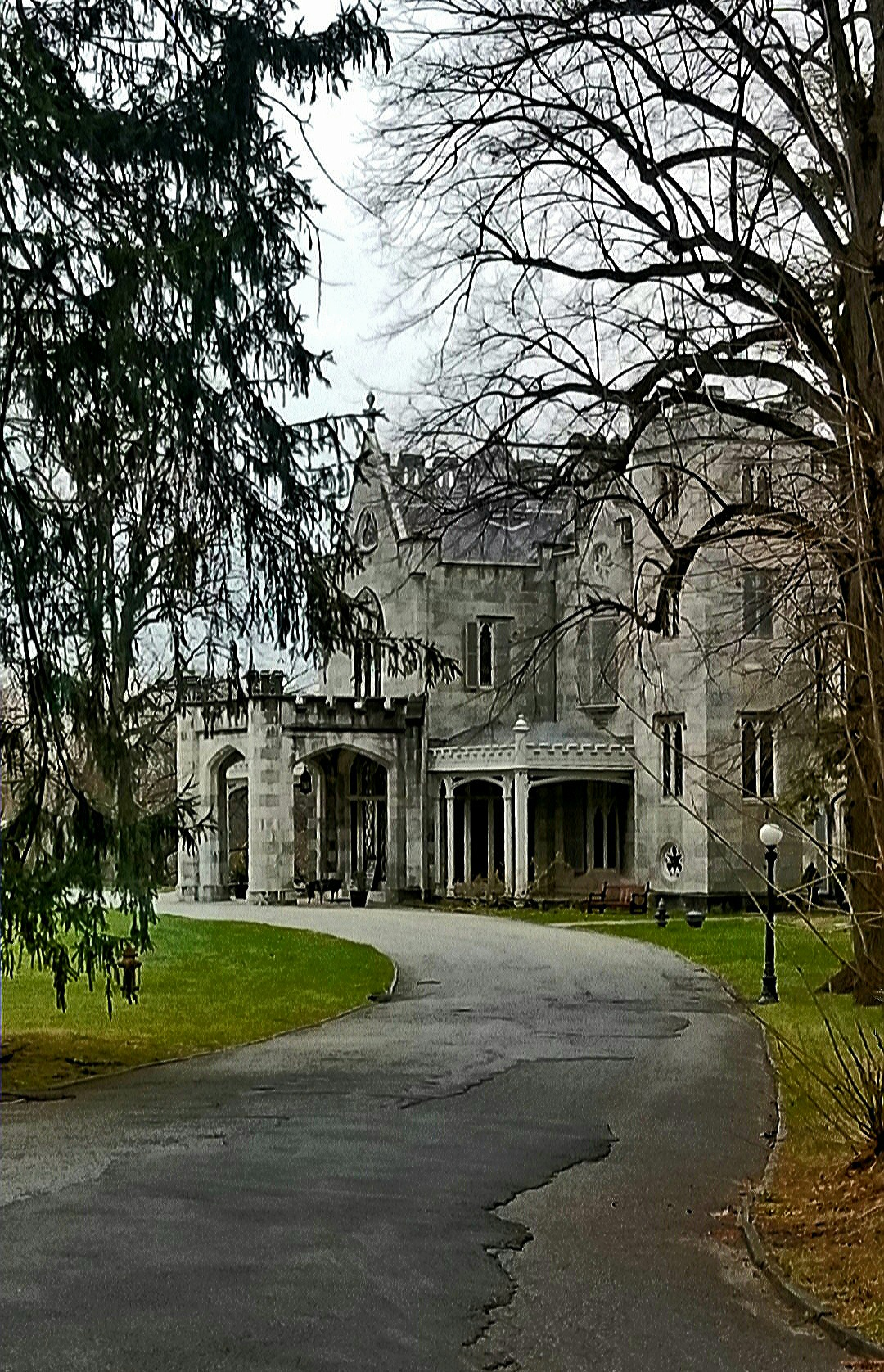
Lyndhurst mansion

Before and during the U.S. Civil War, the Underground Railroad ran through Tarrytown. Tarrytown's famous Foster Memorial AME Zion Church, founded in 1860 by former slaves and abolitionists, served as a vital Underground Railroad stop. Known as the “Freedom Church," it provided food and shelter to escaped slaves en route to Canada or helped them settle in Tarrytown if they wished. One of the church's founders was herself an escaped slave, as were many parishioners.

Company H of the 32nd New York Infantry Regiment that served in the Union Army during the Civil War was composed exclusively of volunteers from the Tarrytown area. They fought in the First Battle of Bull Run, the Peninsular Campaign, and the Battles of South Mountain, Antietam, and Chancellorsville; and their letters home were often published in local newspapers. Many of them are buried in the Sleepy Hollow Cemetery, where the Civil War Soldiers Monument was erected in 1890 in their honor. Its granite base is topped by a 7-foot-6-inch bronze statue of a Union infantry soldier standing at "parade rest"; bronze plaques on the base list some 240 names.

By the middle of the 19th century, Tarrytown was developing as a trading center on the Albany Post Road and a busy commercial port on the Hudson River. The Industrial Revolution brought to it a station on the Hudson River Railroad, factories, banks, and waves of new arrivals. The first Croton Aqueduct, New York City's original water supply system, passed through Tarrytown as part of its route to the city. It was built primarily by Irish immigrants (as was the Hudson River Railroad), many of whom settled in Tarrytown and the adjacent Beekman Town. Tarrytown incorporated as a village in 1870, and Beekman Town followed suit in 1874. The latter assumed the name North Tarrytown, drawing on the commercial success of its closest neighbor, (Note: This naming proved to be confusing, as it would often cause errors in books, articles, and even on picture postcards, with writers and publishers mistakenly labeling places in North Tarrytown as being in Tarrytown.) (it would change its name to "Sleepy Hollow" in 1996).

=== 20th century ===
By the beginning of the 20th century, Tarrytown was a vibrant hub of commerce and industry, with coal and lumberyards, shipyards, and factories manufacturing products ranging from rock drills and kitchen appliances to underwear and wallpaper. Italian, German, and Eastern European immigrants began settling in the Tarrytowns to open stores and shops or work in mills and factories. During the Great Migration, they were joined by African Americans, many of whom worked at the railroad and the North Tarrytown Assembly automobile plant, which was by far the largest employer in the Tarrytown area. Black residents often had to settle in specific areas of Tarrytown, such as "under the hill" or "below Route 9" neighborhoods, due to prevailing segregated housing patterns of the time.

During the Gilded Age, the area around Tarrytown also became a favorite residence for many wealthy industrialists and merchants. At the time, the stretch of estates on both sides of Broadway/Albany Post Road from Irvington to Briarcliff Manor was known as "Millionaires' Row." Kykuit, the Rockefeller family's elaborate mansion, still overlooks Tarrytown from a nearby hill. The Rockefellers worshipped in the First Baptist Church of Tarrytown and generously supported the church and other local establishments and causes. Their close friends, the Warners, whose estate was in Tarrytown's Wilson Park neighborhood, built Tarrytown's imposing library. Lyndhurst mansion, located on the boundary between Tarrytown and Irvington, was successively owned by New York City mayor William Paulding Jr., merchant and industrialist George Merritt, and railroad tycoon Jay Gould. The latter donated money for the construction of Tarrytown Reservoir. His daughter Helen Miller Gould Shepard, who inherited the estate, repurposed some of Lyndhurst's buildings for a sewing school for young local women, a cooking school for boys, and a "fresh-air farm" for disabled and underprivileged children.

On November 19, 1915, a powerful dynamite bomb was discovered at Cedar Cliff, the Tarrytown estate of John D. Archbold, president of the Standard Oil Company. Police theorized the bomb was planted by anarchists and Industrial Workers of the World (IWW) radicals as a protest against the execution of IWW member Joe Hill. The bomb was later defused by police.

During the mid-20th-century urban renewal, Tarrytown's waterfront swampland, coal and lumber yards, junk yards, and downtown slums (such as the controversial “peek-a-boo flats”) were replaced with much needed public housing, parks, and boat basins. The Tappan Zee Bridge was completed in 1955 after three years of construction. All this significantly boosted property valuations in the village. The revitalization process, however, also involved demolishing the landmark Orchard Street and lower Main Street with their historic 19th-century houses and long-standing immigrant-owned businesses. To prevent any further wholesale destruction of neighborhoods, the Village Board passed legislation in March 1979 to establish designated historic districts.

=== 21st century ===
In the early 21st century, significant investments were made in the village's waterfront area, including the development of the Tarrytown section of Westchester RiverWalk. In 2018, the new Tappan Zee Bridge (now called the Mario Cuomo Bridge) replaced the first one, which had reached the end of its structural life and could no longer handle modern traffic demands. A core component of the new bridge project was a dedicated 3.6-mile lane for pedestrians and cyclists, providing unique views of the Hudson River.

== Geography ==
According to the United States Census Bureau, the village has a total area of 5.7 square miles (15 km^{2}), of which 3.0 square miles (7.8 km^{2}) is land and 2.7 square miles (7.0 km^{2}) (47.54%) is water.

The boundary between Tarrytown on the south and Sleepy Hollow on the north runs more or less along Andre Brook (Note: The common and official local spelling for the stream in Tarrytown and Sleepy Hollow is "Andre Brook" (without the accent).) (formerly, Clark's Kill). Since Tarrytown is part of the town of Greenburgh, and Sleepy Hollow is part of the town of Mount Pleasant, Andre Brook also forms the boundary between these towns. The brook originates on Kykuit Hill above the villages and empties into the Hudson River at Tarrytown Bay, near Tarrytown Boat Club.

=== Climate ===
Climate data for Tarrytown, New York
Month	Jan	Feb	Mar	Apr	May	Jun	Jul	Aug	Sep	Oct	Nov	Dec	Year
Mean daily maximum °F (°C)	38 (3)	42 (6)	51 (11)	62 (17)	72 (22)	81 (27)	85 (29)	83 (28)	76 (24)	65 (18)	54 (12)	43 (6)	63 (17)
Mean daily minimum °F (°C)	22 (−6)	24 (−4)	30 (−1)	39 (4)	49 (9)	58 (14)	63 (17)	62 (17)	55 (13)	44 (7)	36 (2)	27 (−3)	42 (6)
Average precipitation inches (mm)	3.81 (97)	3.33 (85)	4.50 (114)	4.54 (115)	4.43 (113)	4.36 (111)	4.66 (118)	4.47 (114)	4.81 (122)	4.57 (116)	4.24 (108)	4.38 (111)	52.1 (1,324)
Source: The Weather Channel

== Demographics ==
Historical population
Census	Pop.	Note	%±
1880	3,025		—
1890	3,562		17.8%
1900	4,770		33.9%
1910	5,600		17.4%
1920	5,807		3.7%
1930	6,841		17.8%
1940	6,874		0.5%
1950	8,851		28.8%
1960	11,109		25.5%
1970	11,115		0.1%
1980	10,648		−4.2%
1990	10,739		0.9%
2000	11,090		3.3%
2010	11,277		1.7%
2020	11,860		5.2%
U.S. Decennial Census

=== 2020 census ===
As of the 2020 census, Tarrytown had a population of 11,860. The median age was 42.8 years. 18.7% of residents were under the age of 18 and 19.6% of residents were 65 years of age or older. For every 100 females there were 89.5 males, and for every 100 females age 18 and over there were 85.7 males age 18 and over.

100.0% of residents lived in urban areas, while 0.0% lived in rural areas.

There were 4,844 households in Tarrytown, of which 28.3% had children under the age of 18 living in them. Of all households, 46.2% were married-couple households, 15.6% were households with a male householder and no spouse or partner present, and 31.2% were households with a female householder and no spouse or partner present. About 30.8% of all households were made up of individuals and 14.2% had someone living alone who was 65 years of age or older.

There were 5,113 housing units, of which 5.3% were vacant. The homeowner vacancy rate was 1.2% and the rental vacancy rate was 4.5%.

Racial composition as of the 2020 census
Race	Number	Percent
White	7,466	63.0%
Black or African American	738	6.2%
American Indian and Alaska Native	33	0.3%
Asian	861	7.3%
Native Hawaiian and Other Pacific Islander	1	0.0%
Some other race	1,371	11.6%
Two or more races	1,390	11.7%
Hispanic or Latino (of any race)	2,830	23.9%

=== 2000 census ===
As of the 2000 census, there were 11,090 people, 4,533 households, and 2,765 families residing in the village. The population density was 3,724.7 inhabitants per square mile (1,438.1/km^{2}). There were 4,688 housing units at an average density of 1,574.5 units per square mile (607.9 units/km^{2}). The racial makeup of the village was 77.44% White, 7.04% African American, 0.22% Native American, 6.49% Asian, 0.05% Pacific Islander, 5.29% from other races, and 3.47% from two or more races. Hispanic or Latino of any race were 16.17% of the population.

There were 4,533 households, out of which 26.6% had children under the age of 18 living with them, 48.5% were married couples living together, 9.6% had a female householder with no husband present, and 39.0% were non-families. 31.2% of all households were made up of individuals, and 9.7% had someone living alone who was 65 years of age or older. The average household size was 2.33 and the average family size was 2.95. In the village, the population was spread out, with 19.7% under the age of 18, 8.6% from 18 to 24, 34.8% from 25 to 44, 22.5% from 45 to 64, and 14.4% who were 65 years of age or older. The median age was 37 years. For every 100 females, there were 82.5 males. For every 100 females age 18 and over, there were 77.8 males. The median income for a household in the village was $68,762, and the median income for a family was $82,445. Males had a median income of $61,699 versus $41,054 for females. The per capita income for the village was $39,472. About 1.8% of families and 4.7% of the population were below the poverty line, including 5.4% of those under age 18 and 4.6% of those age 65 or over.

== Arts and culture ==
=== Points of interest ===
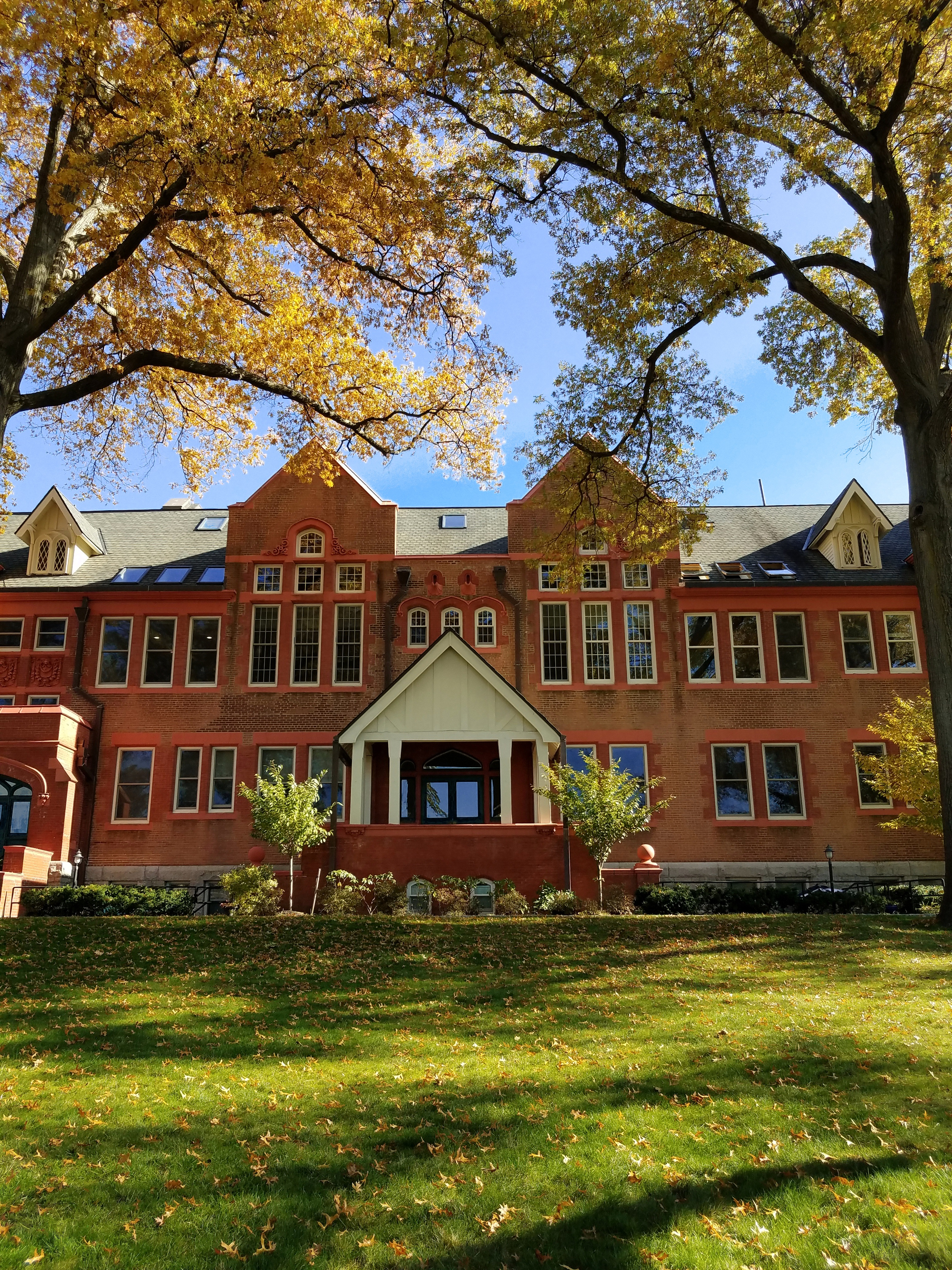
Former Washington Irving High School

- Carrollcliffe, a turn-of the-20th-century castle-like building
- Christ Episcopal Church (Christ Church San Marcos), landmark early Gothic Revival church associated with Washington Irving
- First Baptist Church of Tarrytown, of which the Rockefellers were members
- Foster Memorial AME Zion Church, oldest Black church in Westchester County
- Hackley School, historic private school
- Lyndhurst, Gothic Revival mansion and grounds
- North Grove Street Historic District, including the exhibits at the, Historical Society of Sleepy Hollow and Tarrytown at 1 Grove St.
- Patriot's Park, site of John André's capture
- Reformed Church of the Tarrytowns, continuation of original congregation of the Old Dutch Church of Sleepy Hollow
- Sunnyside, historic home of author Washington Irving
- Tarrytown Music Hall, one of the oldest surviving theaters in Westchester County; one of 6% in the US built before 1900
- Tarrytown Lakes Park, created from the decommissioned Tarrytown Reservoir
- Tarrytown section of Westchester RiverWalk, featuring interpretive signage describing the ecology, culture, and history of the area
- Warner Library, Neoclassical library building constructed in 1928
- Former Washington Irving High School

The Christ Episcopal Church (Christ Church San Marcos), First Baptist Church of Tarrytown, Foster Memorial AME Zion Church, former Washington Irving High School, North Grove Street Historic District, Patriot's Park, and Tarrytown Music Hall are listed on the National Register of Historic Places. Lyndhurst and Sunnyside are listed as National Historic Landmarks.

=== Library ===
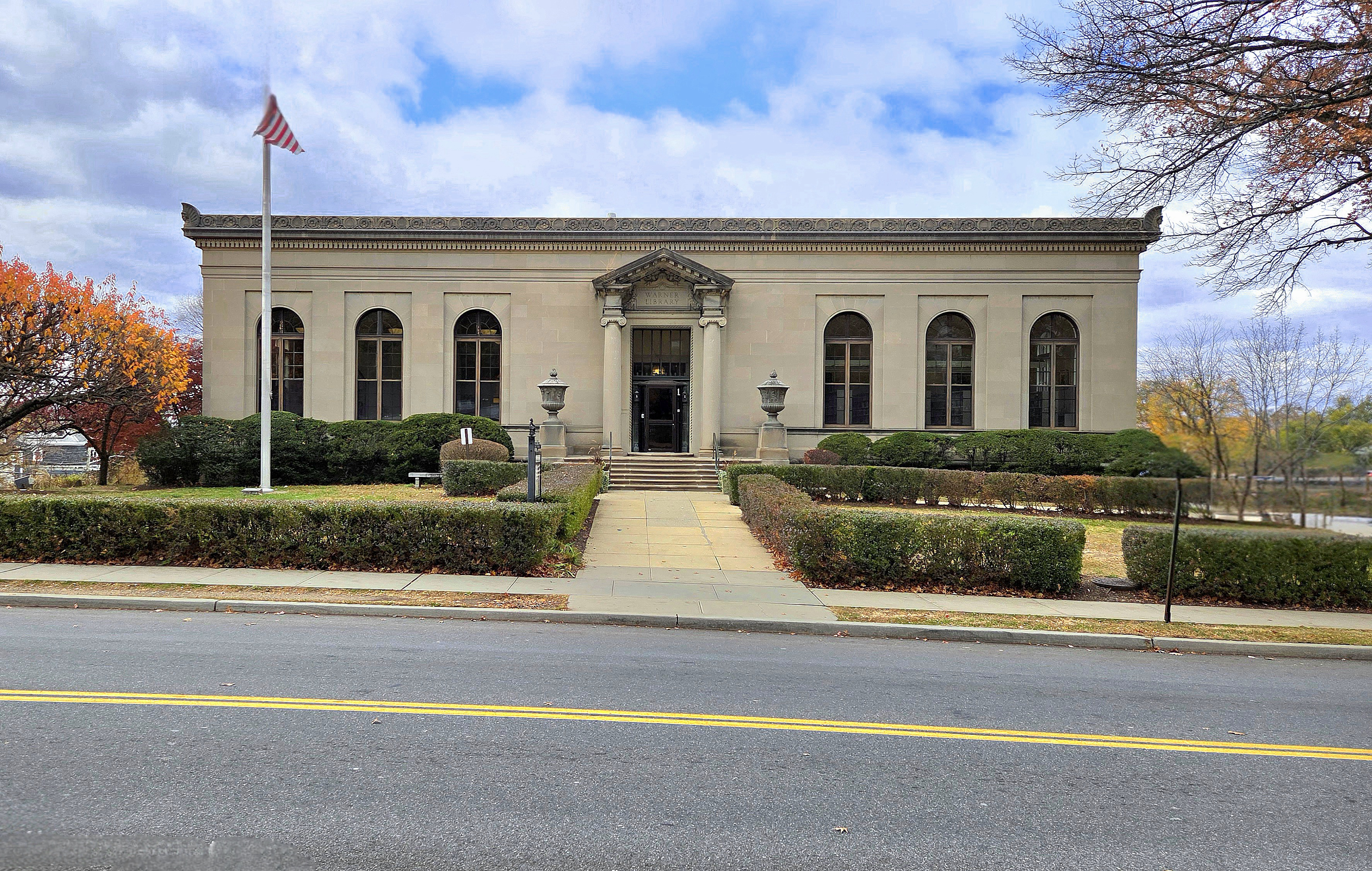
Warner Library

The Warner Library has served both villages since 1929. It was built and gifted to the two communities by Worcester Reed Warner and his wife, Cornelia, who lived in Tarrytown. The library cost $250,000 to build, and the Warners further endowed it with $50,000 for the purchase of books. Constructed of Vermont limestone, the Neoclassical building was designed by Walter Dabney Blair.

The library is a member of Westchester Library System.

=== Places of worship in Tarrytown and Sleepy Hollow ===
The shared religious history between Tarrytown and Sleepy Hollow is centered around the Old Dutch Church of Sleepy Hollow, which was the only house of worship in the area for over 150 years.

Among landmark churches are: the Reformed Church of the Tarrytowns, which is the continuation of the original congregation that worshipped at the Old Dutch Church; the Foster Memorial AME Zion Church on Wildey Street, the oldest black church in Westchester County; the First Baptist Church of Tarrytown, historically tied with the Rockefeller family; and Christ Episcopal Church (currently referred to as Christ Church San Marcos), which historically is associated with Washington Irving and now includes the San Marcos Mission, a Spanish-language ministry.

Located in Tarrytown, the Temple Beth Abraham is one of a few synagogues in the United States that serve both Reform and Conservative traditions.

== Education ==
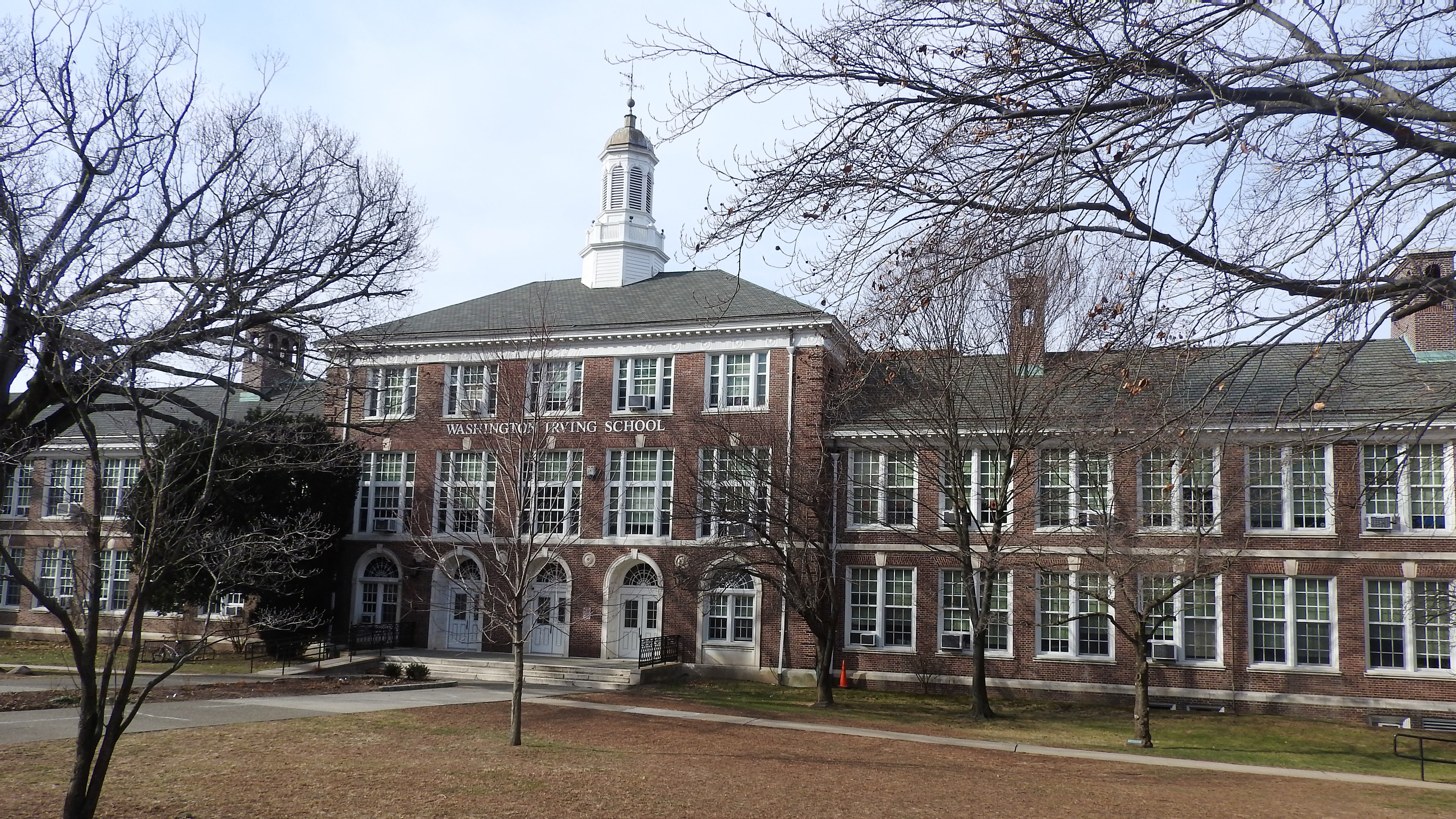
Washington Irving Intermediate School

Tarrytown was home to Marymount College, an independent women's college established in 1907. Amid financial struggle, Marymount was taken over by Fordham University in 2002, but the effort was unsuccessful: the last graduates of "Marymount College of Fordham University" received diplomas in 2007. The historic hilltop campus was sold to the Swiss firm EF and became a branch of its foreign exchange secondary school, the EF International Academy.

Tarrytown is divided between two school districts: Union Free School District of the Tarrytowns and Irvington Union Free School District. The former school district also includes most of Sleepy Hollow. The Tarrytown school district supervises five separate K-8 schools, John Paulding, Tappan Hill, W.L. Morse, Washington Irving Intermediate school, Sleepy Hollow Middle School, as well as Sleepy Hollow High School. A Roman Catholic elementary, the Transfiguration School (of the Roman Catholic Archdiocese of New York), was established in 1949 and is maintained by the local parish.

Tarrytown is also home to the Hackley School, a private K–12 college preparatory. Situated on Castle Ridge, the school first opened in 1899.

== Infrastructure ==
=== Transportation ===
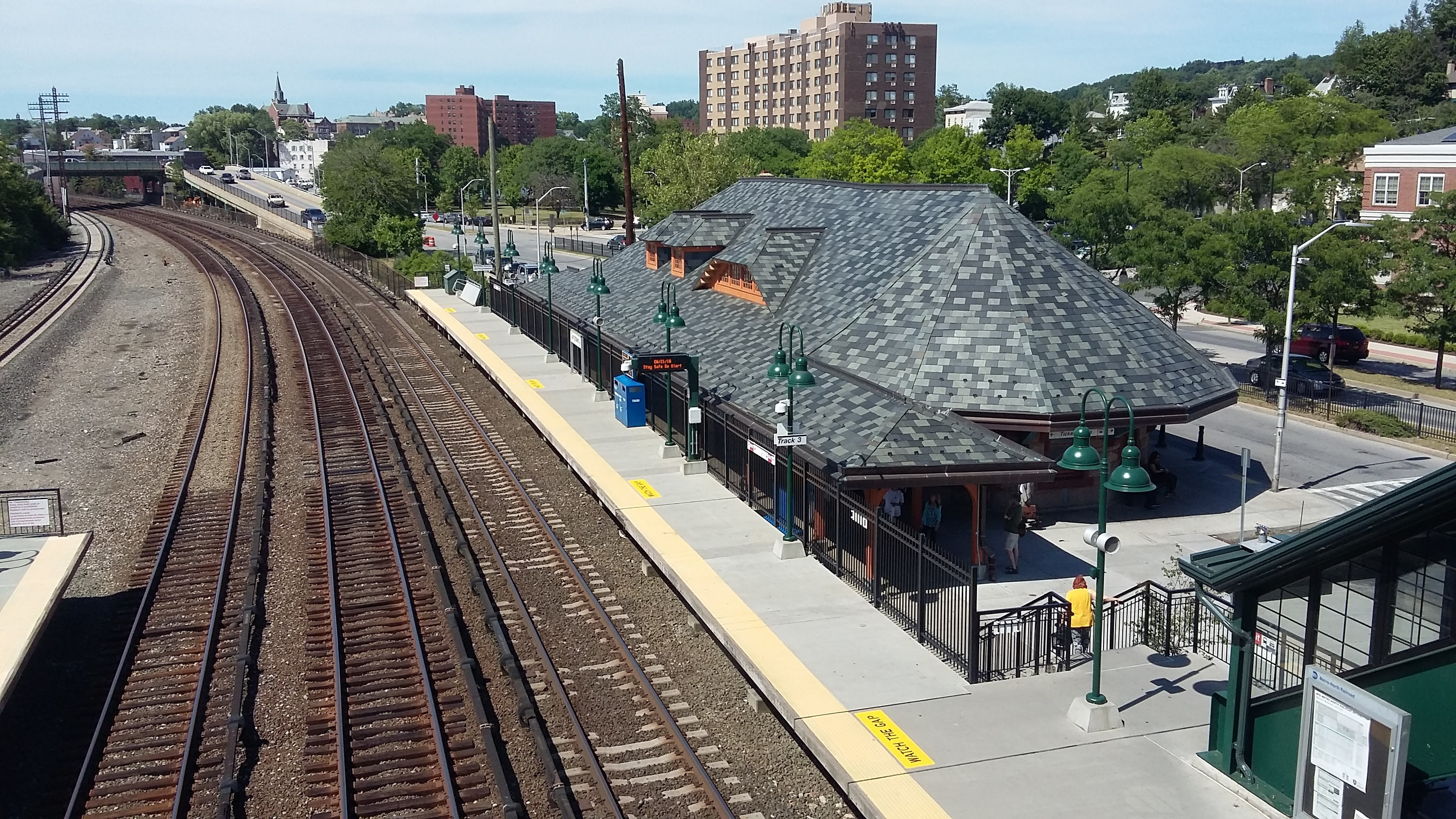
Tarrytown Metro North Train Station

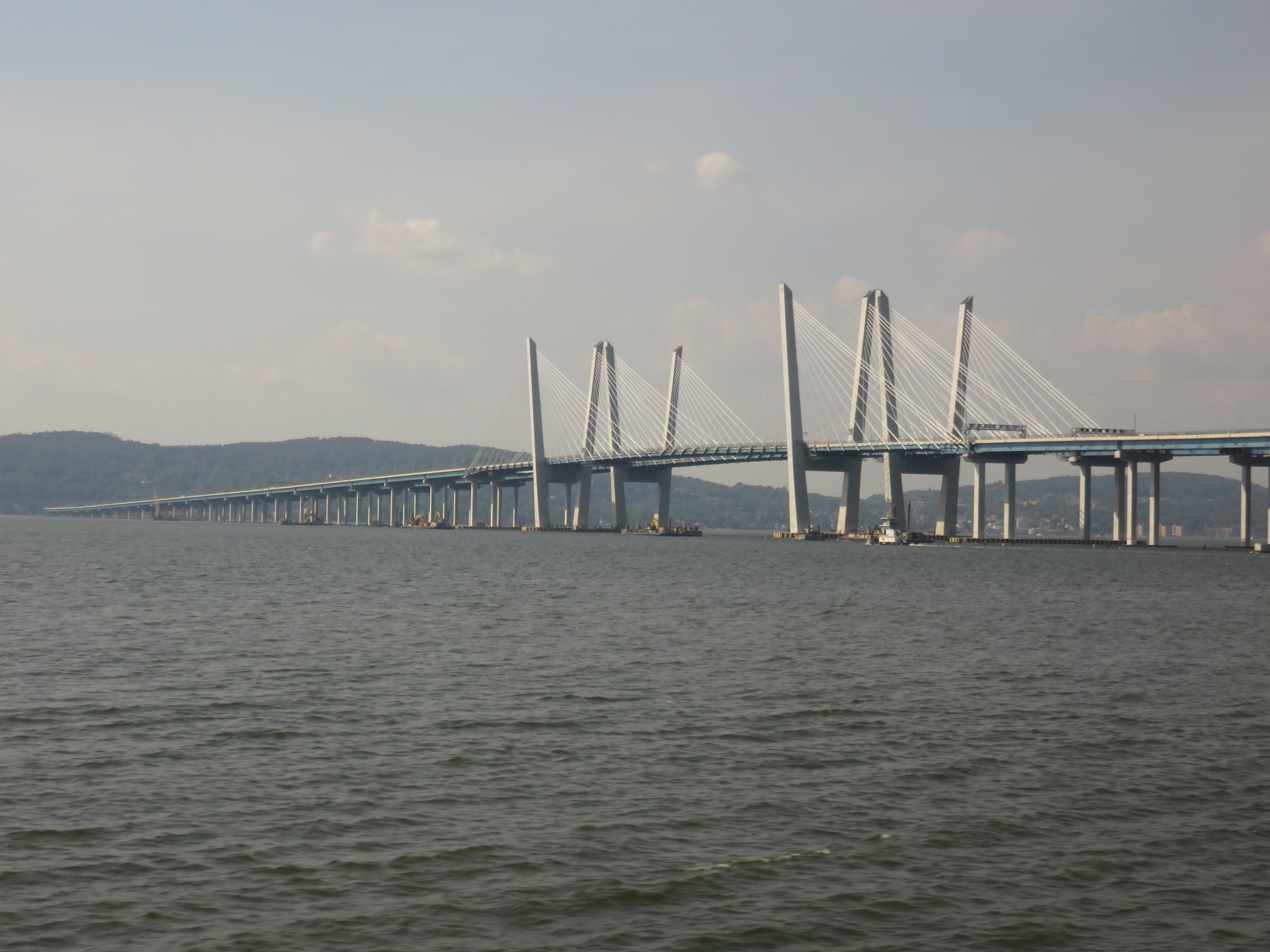
Tappan Zee Bridge (2017–present) connects Tarrytown with South Nyack

Tarrytown has access to highways I-87 and I-287, and is the site of the eastern end of the New York State Thruway's Tappan Zee Bridge. I-87 continues south to New York City, while I-287 heads east across Westchester to link up with the Saw Mill River Parkway, the Sprain Brook Parkway, the Merritt Parkway/Hutchinson River Parkway and I-95.

Tarrytown Train Station is served by Metro-North Railroad commuter service. Metro-North trains go to New York City's Grand Central Terminal, and also go as far north as Poughkeepsie. Tarrytown is a major stop on the Hudson Line due to a large number of commuters crossing the Tappan Zee Bridge on Hudson Link buses from Rockland County to catch express service to Manhattan.

Bee-Line Bus System service is provided within Tarrytown.

== Notable people ==
- Adam Badeau (1831–1895), diplomat Union Army officer during the Civil War, and author
- J. David Bleich (born 1936), rabbi and authority on Jewish law and ethics
- Walter Dabney Blair (1877 –1953), architect
- James S. Clarkson (1842–1918), Republican Party leader and editor of the Iowa State Register
- Greg Fitzsimmons (born 1966), comedian
- Stuart W. Frost (1891–1980), entomologist, author, and professor at Pennsylvania State University
- Charles Griffes (1884–1920), composer and director of musical studies at the Hackley School for Boys in Tarrytown
- Milo Hastings (1884–1957), early 20th century science fiction writer and health food advocate
- Washington Irving (1783–1859), writer and diplomat
- Rockwell Kent (1882–1971), artist
- Bud Kerr professional football player
- Louis Klopsch (1852–1910), editor of The Christian Herald, buried in the Tarrytown Cemetery
- Moon Kook-jin (born 1970), founder of gun manufacturer Kahr Arms
- Carolyn Ringer Lepre, academic administrator, president of Salisbury University since 2022
- Addie Wilkins Jackson (1875–1938), suffragist and political activist
- Tim Maia, Brazilian singer, a.k.a. "Jimmy the Brazilian", lived in Tarrytown for a time during the late 1950s and early 1960s (1959–1963) before being arrested in Miami and deported back to his South American home country after a stint of six months in jail.
- Greg Murphy (born 1963), Congressman
- Norman Mingo (1896–1980), illustrator, known for the "Alfred E. Neuman" portrait commissioned for Mad magazine
- Sylvia Nasar (born 1947), journalist and author recognized for A Beautiful Mind, a 1998 biography of John Nash
- Florence Oberle (1869–1943), stage and silent film actress
- Moses F. Odell (1818–1866), congressman
- William Paulding Jr. (1770–1854), two-term mayor of New York City
- Clara Claiborne Park (1923–2010), author who raised awareness of autism
- Brett Pesce (born 1994), professional hockey player for the New Jersey Devils
- William Prince (1913–1996), actor
- Joe Queenan (born 1950), writer
- Jenifer Rajkumar (born 1982), politician
- Marcius D. Raymond (1833–1911), prominent local historian
- David Sanborn (1945–2024), saxophonist
- Helen Miller Gould Shepard (1868–1938), prominent philanthropist
- Sam Tanenhaus (born 1955), historian, biographer, editor of The New York Times Book Review and Week in Review
- Worcester Reed Warner (1846–1929), designer of precision instruments and industrialist, who built Tarrytown's Warner Library
- Mark Whipple (born 1957), football player and coach
- Vanessa Williams (born 1963), singer, actress, and 1984 Miss America

== In popular culture ==
- The 1962 release of The Brain That Wouldn't Die was shot in and around Tarrytown in 1959
- Washington Irving's story "The Legend of Sleepy Hollow" is set in and around Tarrytown. The name "Sleepy Hollow" comes from a secluded glen located north of Tarrytown. In 1996, the residents of North Tarrytown (a village north of Tarrytown around the area of Sleepy Hollow) voted to formally change the village's name to Sleepy Hollow.
- Judy Blume's children's novel Otherwise Known as Sheila the Great is mostly set in Tarrytown, where the title character and her family spend their summer vacation.
- Betty Draper joins the Junior League of Tarrytown in Season 3 of Mad Men, several Episodes portray the suburban Life in the 60s and the Tarrytown Reservoir

== See also ==
- Historic Hudson Valley
- History of Westchester County, New York
