= Tarrytown Reservoir =

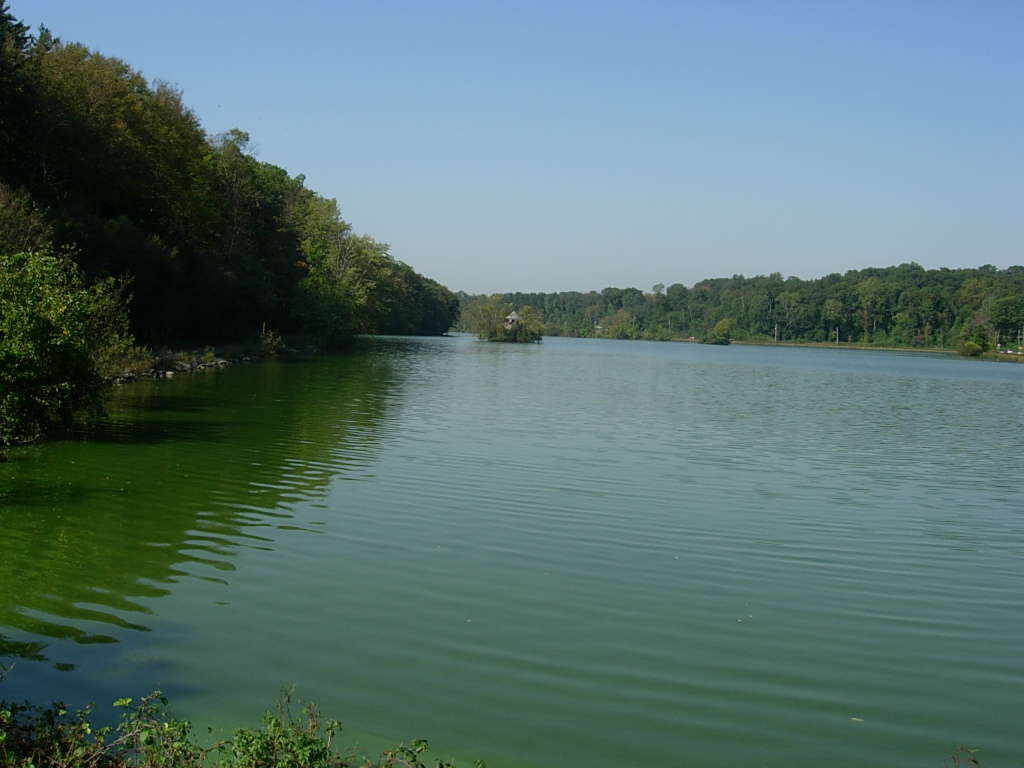
- Tarrytown Reservoir in 2011

- Location within New York
- Location: Tarrytown, New York
- Coordinates: 41°4′58″N 73°50′28″W
- Type: Reservoir
- Catchment area: 1.4 sq mi (3.6 km^{2})
- Basin countries: United States
- Surface area: 81 acres (0.33 km^{2})
- Surface elevation: 253 ft (77 m)

The Tarrytown Reservoir is an 81-acre (0.33 km^{2}) decommissioned storage reservoir in Tarrytown, New York. It is now part of the Tarrytown Lakes Park.

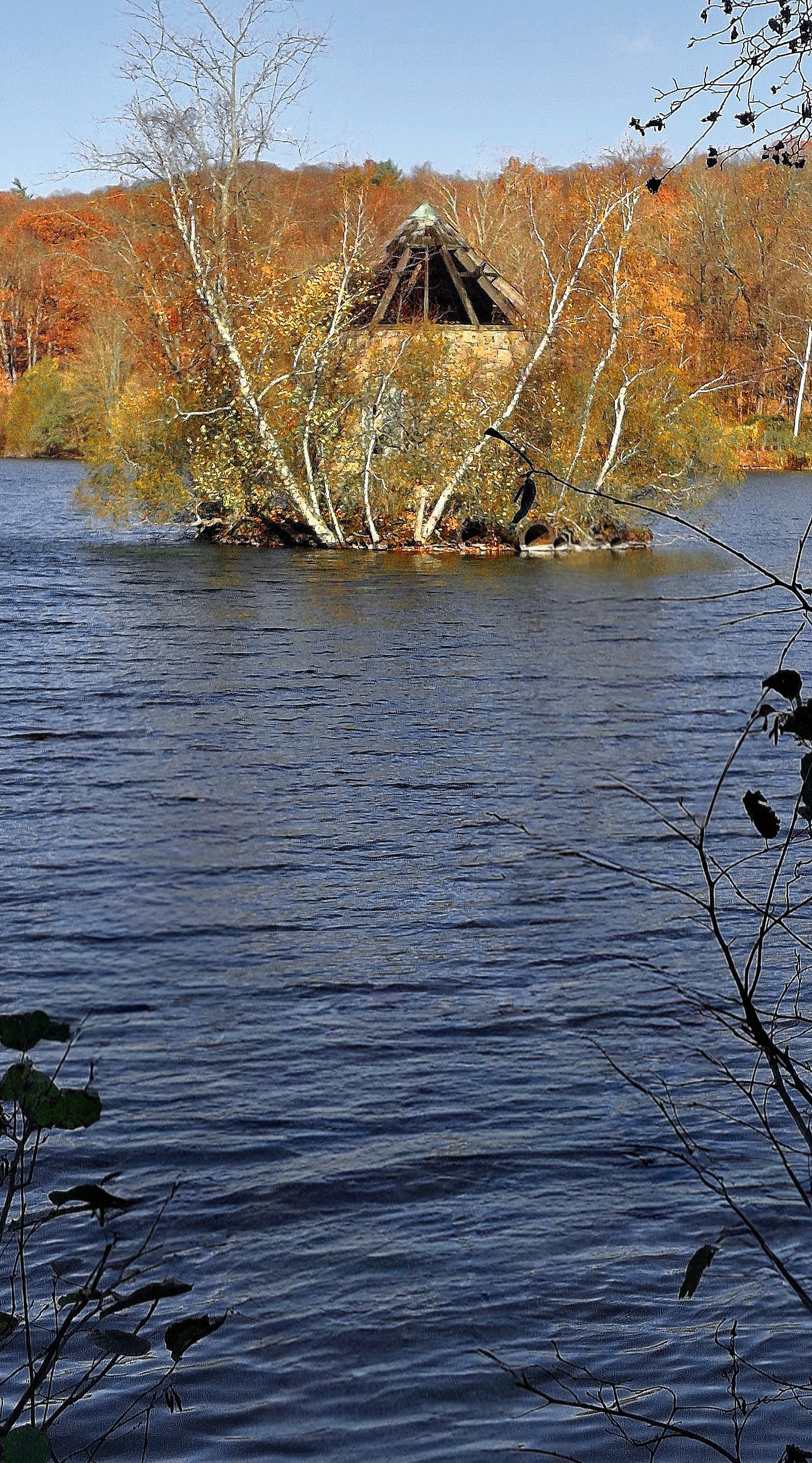
Well house in the Lower Lake, part of the decommissioned Tarrytown Reservoir system

The reservoir was completed in 1897 by the village of Tarrytown as the village's main storage reservoir. Railroad magnate Jay Gould, owner of Lyndhurst estate in Tarrytown, contributed $100,000 (approximately $3,900,000 in today's value as of 2025) for the project. The reservoir was formed by the Tarrytown Waterworks Dam, which impounded Storm Brook, a tributary of the Saw Mill River. The reservoir itself, consisting of the Upper Lake and the Lower Lake, had a maximum capacity of 200 million gallons of water, or 1,100 acre-feet (1,400,000 m^{3}).

The Tarrytown Waterworks Dam is earthen, 18 feet (5.5 m) high, 315 feet (96 m) long, and sits at the head of a drainage area of 1.4 square miles (3.6 km^{2}). When the reservoir was operational, two well houses stood on small islands near the edge of the larger Lower Lake; one of them is still there today. The Eastview Pumping Station still stands on the easternmost point of the reservoir; it houses filters and pumps that were used until 1993.

The reservoir was decommissioned in 1993 because it could no longer supply enough drinking water for the village's growing population, and Tarrytown began sourcing its water from the larger New York City water supply system. The two lakes, together with the 60 acres surrounding them, comprise the Tarrytown Lakes Park, a scenic recreation area for walking and biking. Kayaking (with kayak rentals in season) and fishing are by village permit. The walking trails connect to both the North County Trailway and the South County Trailway, parts of the Empire State Trail.

== Gallery ==
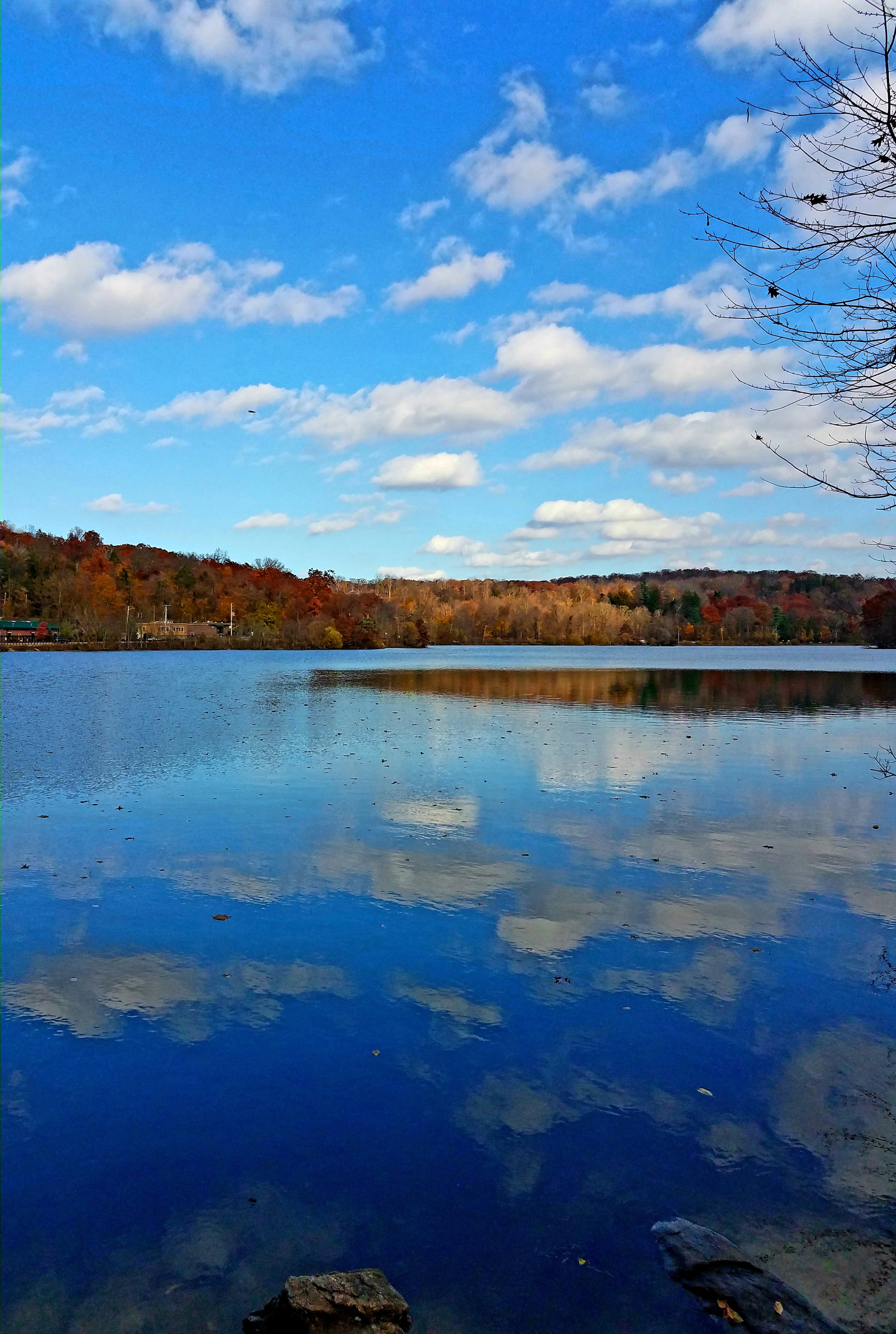
The Lower Lake

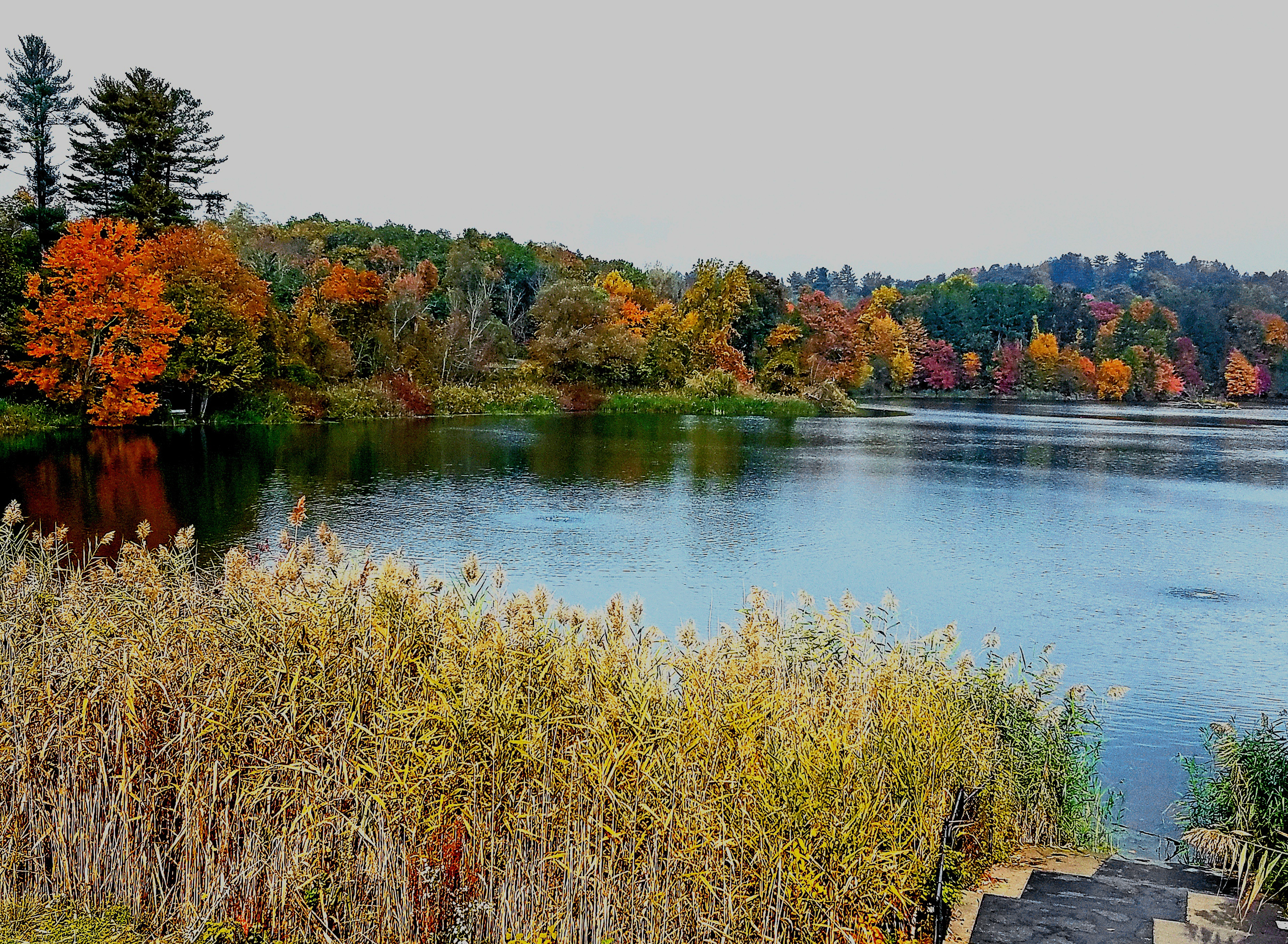
The Upper Lake

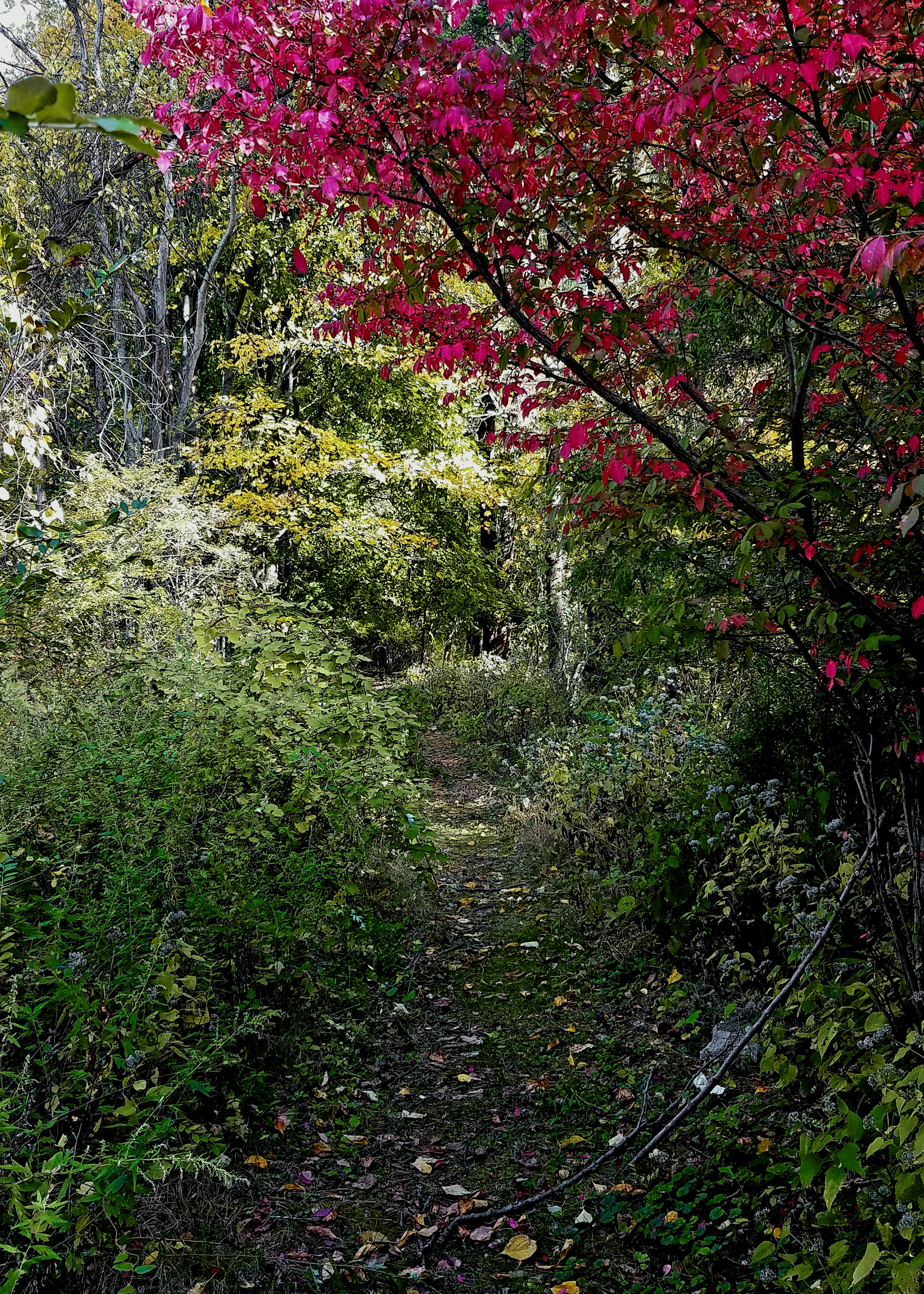
A path in the Tarrytown Lakes Park

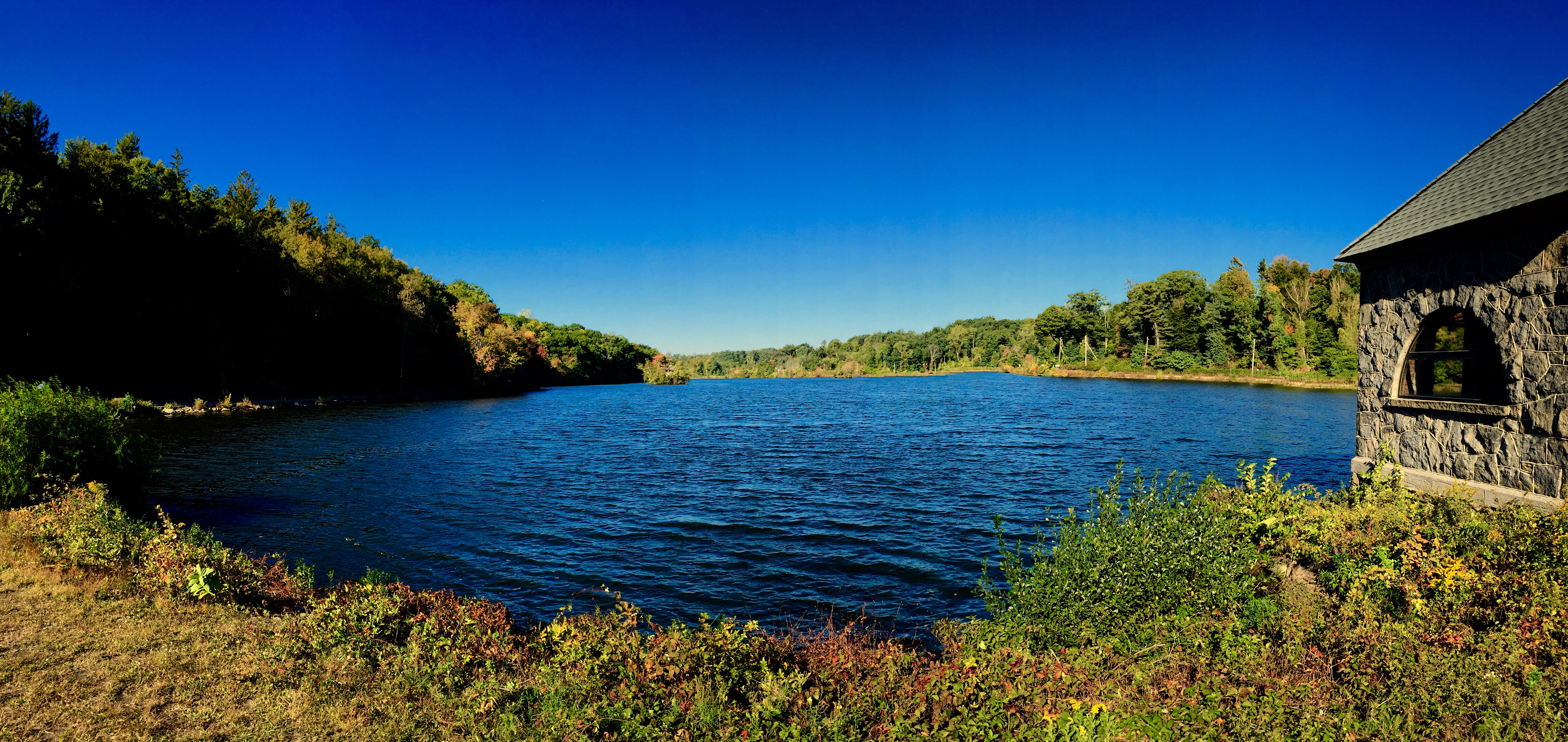
Tarrytown Reservoir panorama

== See also ==
- List of reservoirs and dams in New York
