= Sleepy Hollow High School (New York) =

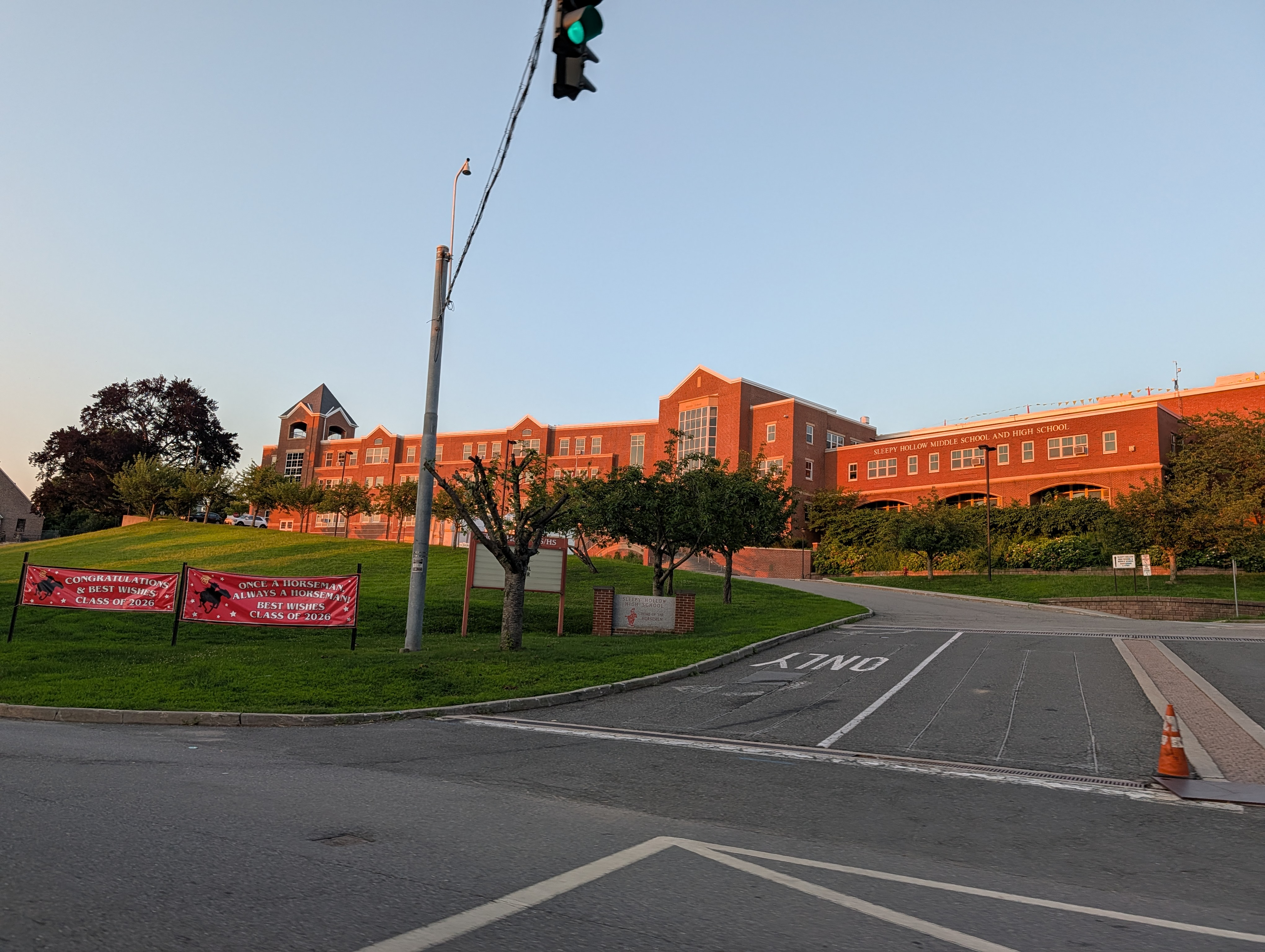

Location
- 210 North Broadway; Sleepy Hollow, Westchester County, New York 10591; United States; 41°5′2″N 73°51′28″W

Information
- Type: High School
- School district: Union Free School District Of The Tarrytowns
- NCES District ID: 3628650
- NCES School ID: 362865003889
- Principal: Deborah Brand
- Assistant Principal 1: Dan Larkin
- Assistant Principal 2: Jessica Perez
- Grades: 9–12
- Mascot: Headless Horseman
- Website: hs.tufsd.org

Sleepy Hollow High School (SHHS) is a high school located in Sleepy Hollow, Westchester County, New York, United States. It is part of the Union Free School District of Tarrytowns. The mascot is the Headless Horseman. It is consistently ranked in the top 5–10% of high schools in New York State. Its diverse student body is reflective of the village's wide array of cultures, socioeconomics, and inclusiveness and is often recognized for excellence in this regard.

The current building, adjacent to the historic Edward Harden Mansion, is part of the school complex that sits atop a knoll referred to in Washington Irving's short story "The Legend of Sleepy Hollow," in which the author describes protagonist Ichabod Crane's first encounter with and race from the Headless Horseman through and around what is now known as Patriots Park: Just at this moment a plashy tramp by the side of the bridge caught the sensitive ear of Ichabod. In the dark shadow of the grove, on the margin of the brook, he beheld something huge, misshapen and towering.

== Academics ==
Percent Proficient - Reading	57%
Percent Proficient - Math	95%
Average Graduation Rate	93%
Average SAT Score	1210
Average ACT Score	28

According to U.S. News, Sleepy Hollow High School is ranked 146th within New York. The AP Course participation rate at Sleepy Hollow High School is 67%.

Student Demographics
Race	Percentage
Hispanic	65.4%
White	26.1%
Black	3.3%
Two or more races	2.7%
Asian	2.6%

== Notable alumni ==
- Dave Anthony, stand-up comedian, writer, actor and podcaster
- Kathleen Beller, actress
- David Bromberg, string instrumentalist, vocalist, and band leader
- Erik Frandsen, actor, guitarist, and singer-songwriter associated with the Greenwich Village folk scene
- Keith Hamilton Cobb, actor best known for The Young and the Restless
- Mekeli Ieremia, National Football League player for Brigham Young University and the Chicago Bears
- Caitlyn Jenner, Olympian, television personality, and activist
- Cyrus Margono, professional soccer player
- Chris Moore, National Hockey League sportscaster and radio personality
- Judy Richardson, documentary filmmaker and civil rights activist
- Adam Savage, co-host of the television show MythBusters
- Gregg L. Semenza, Nobel Prize-awarded physician, researcher, and professor
