= Mekeli Ieremia =

American football player (born 1954)

No. 73
- Position: Defensive tackle

Personal information
- Born: March 4, 1954 (age 72); Niosafutu, American Samoa
- Listed height: 6 ft 2 in (1.88 m)
- Listed weight: 244 lb (111 kg)

Career information
- High school: Sleepy Hollow (Sleepy Hollow, New York, U.S.)
- College: BYU (1974–1977)
- NFL draft: 1978: 6th round, 158th overall pick

Career history
- Chicago Bears (1978)*; Buffalo Bills (1978–1980)
- * Offseason or practice squad member only
- Stats at Pro Football Reference

Mekeli Tolufale Ieremia (born March 4, 1954) is an American Samoan former professional football defensive tackle who played one season with the Buffalo Bills of the National Football League (NFL). He played college football at BYU and was selected by the Chicago Bears in the sixth round of the 1978 NFL draft.

== Early life and college ==
Mekeli Tolufale Ieremia was born on March 4, 1954, in Niosafutu, American Samoa. He attended Sleepy Hollow High School in Sleepy Hollow, New York.

Ieremia was a four-year letterman for the BYU Cougars of Brigham Young University from 1974 to 1977.

== Professional career ==
Ieremia was selected by the Chicago Bears in the sixth round, with the 158th overall pick, of the 1978 NFL draft. He was released by the Bears on August 22, 1978.

Ieremia signed with the Buffalo Bills on December 7, 1978. He then played in two games for the Bills during the 1978 season. He was placed on injured reserve on August 14, 1979, and missed the entire season. On August 20, 1980, Ieremia was placed on injured reserve for the second consecutive year and ended up missing the entire season once again. He was released by the Bills in 1981.

== Personal life ==
Ieremia opened a youth reform camp called New Hope Academy in Samoa but it was closed after complaints from parents and staff. Shortly after New Hope closed, Ieremia opened Aloha Youth Academy in Laie, Hawaii in April 1999. However, it was shut down in November 1999 after failing to secure state licensing. In August 2000, Ieremia was sentenced to ten years in prison for theft of $4.7 million from the Socorro Independent School District (SISD) in El Paso, Texas. He was working for SISD at the time as the director of risk management. In that role, he siphoned money out of SISD's workers' compensation fund to pay a "golfing buddy" for high priced and unnecessary employee background checks.
