= Sixth borough =

Proposed political division of New York City

The term sixth borough is used to describe any of a number of places that are not politically within the borders of any of the five boroughs of New York City but have been referred to as a metaphorical part of the city by virtue of their geographic location, demographic composition, special affiliation with New York City, or cosmopolitan character. They include adjacent cities and counties in the New York metropolitan area as well as in other states, U.S. territories, and foreign countries.

== Within the New York metropolitan area ==
=== Historical proposals ===
The Westchester County cities of Yonkers and Mount Vernon directly border the northern part of the Bronx and share much of that borough's heavily urbanized character. In 1894, the voters of Yonkers and Mount Vernon, along with voters in other parts of southern Westchester, took part in a referendum to determine if they wanted to become part of New York City, along with the voters in Kings, Queens and Richmond Counties (today's Brooklyn, Queens, and Staten Island, respectively). At that time, the city consisted only of Manhattan and a portion of the present-day Bronx, which had been part of Westchester until it became part of New York City in 1874. While the results of the 1894 vote were positive elsewhere, including in several other adjacent sections of Westchester, which were then annexed to the city and which thus became part of the new borough of the Bronx, the returns were so negative in Yonkers and Mount Vernon that those two areas were not included in the consolidated city and remained independent municipalities. A subway connection was planned between Getty Square in downtown Yonkers and the New York City Subway, but the project was abandoned after the failed merger vote. Local residents frequently refer to the area as "the sixth borough", referring to the two cities' location bordering the Bronx, the high number of local residents employed in Manhattan, and the area's similarly urban character.

In 1934, a bill submitted by New York City alderman Elias H. Jacobs proposed merging Yonkers into New York City as a sixth borough. Joseph F. Loehr, then Mayor of Yonkers, was opposed to the merger, despite Jacobs's argument that such a maneuver would cause a rise in real estate prices and increase quality of transit.

=== Hudson Waterfront ===
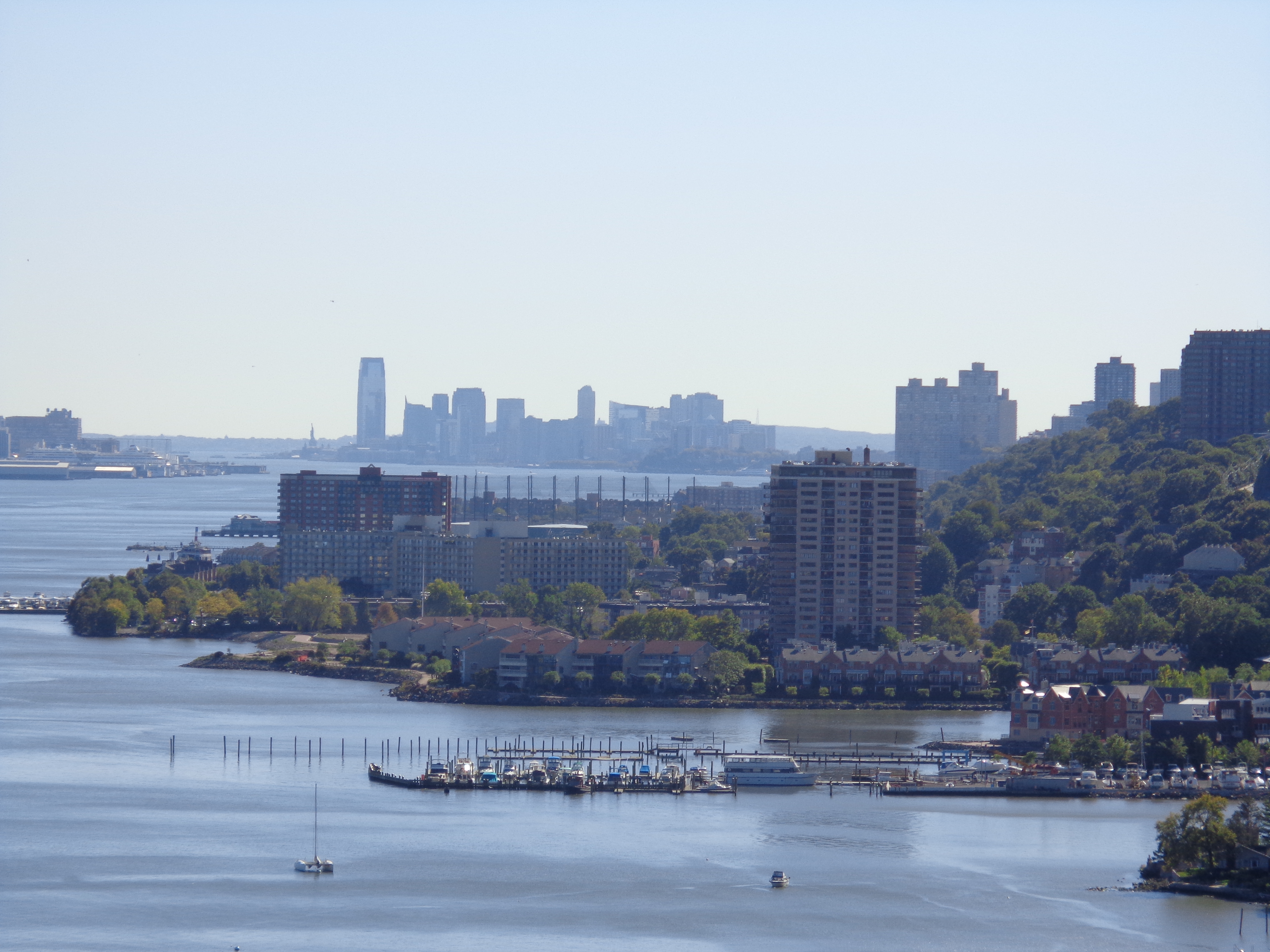
A handful of locations along the Hudson Waterfront have been referred to as the sixth borough of New York City.

New Jersey's Hudson Waterfront lies opposite Manhattan on the North River, and during the Dutch colonial era, it was under the jurisdiction of New Amsterdam and known as Bergen. Jersey City and Hoboken, and greater Hudson County (of which they are part), are sometimes referred to as the sixth borough, given their proximity and connections by PATH trains to the city. Fort Lee, in Bergen County, opposite Upper Manhattan and connected by the George Washington Bridge, has also been called the sixth borough. In the 1920s, soon after the creation of the Port Authority of New York and New Jersey, there were calls to integrate the rail and subway system in New York and northern New Jersey by expanding the New York City Subway. After Mayor Bloomberg called for the 7 Subway Extension to continue to Secaucus Junction, a feasibility study was conducted and released in April 2013.

=== Waterways and islands ===
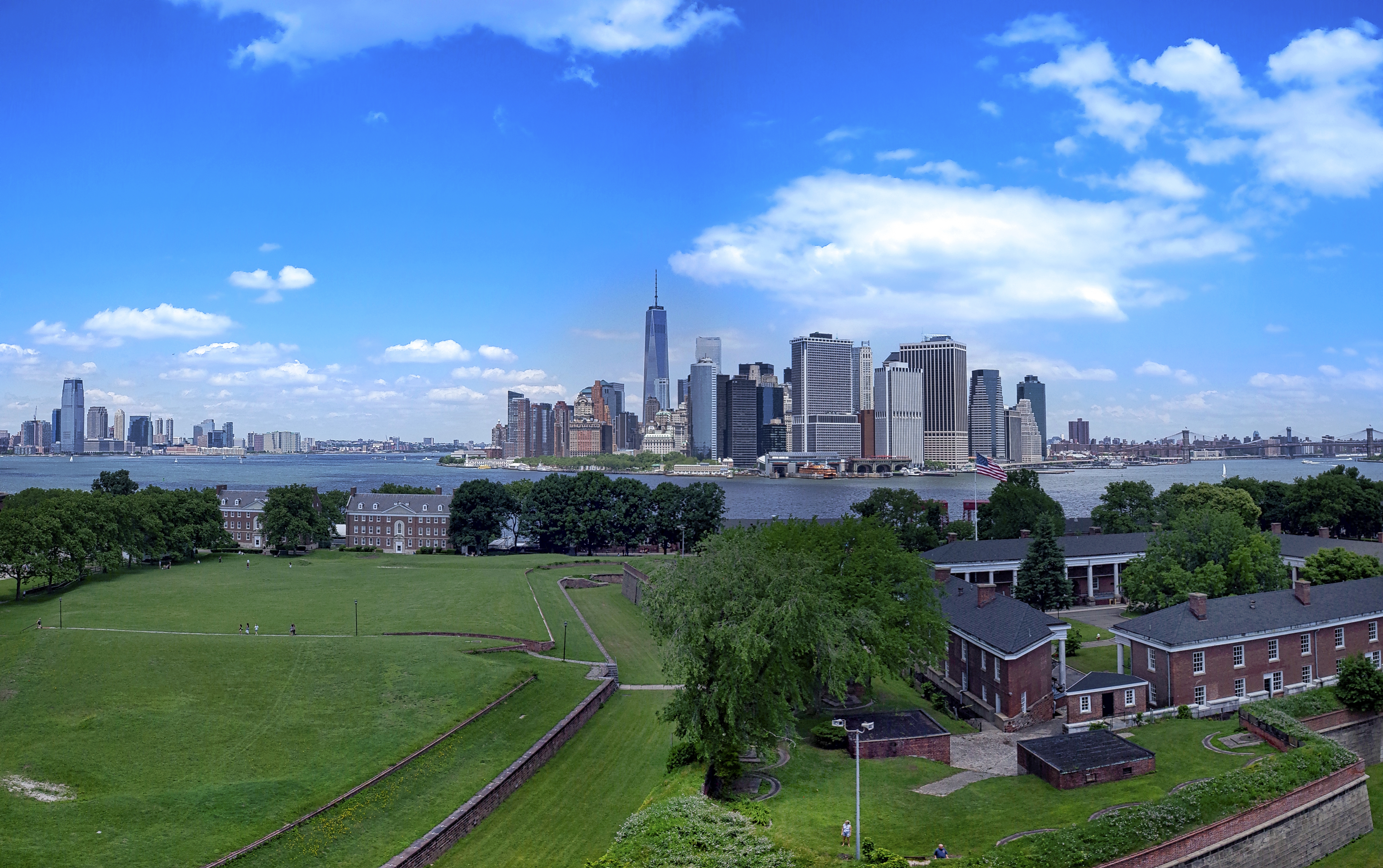
Governors Island is a place that has been referred to as a sixth borough of New York City.

In 2011, New York Mayor Michael Bloomberg referred to the city's waterfront and waterways as a composite sixth borough during presentations of planned rehabilitation projects along the city's shoreline, including Governors Island in the Upper New York Bay. Other individuals have also referred to the city's waterways as a sixth borough. Rikers Island has been called the sixth borough as well.

Several 20th- and 21st-century proposals have been made for a drastic Lower Manhattan expansion encompassing Governors Island, and have sometimes been characterized as visions for a "sixth borough".

=== Other communities within the New York metropolitan area ===
Other communities within the New York City Consolidated Statistical Area have often been referred to as sixth boroughs, especially diverse urban centers such as Stamford and New Haven. Historically, these nearby cities have drawn in significant populations from New York City through outmigration and also share similar cultural characteristics with the city, such as disproportionately large Italian and Jewish American populations.

== Outside the New York metropolitan area ==
Places outside the New York metropolitan area that are home to large populations of former New Yorkers have also been referred to as the "sixth borough", including Philadelphia; Miami, and South Florida in general; Los Angeles; and, outside the continental U.S., Puerto Rico. Among those places referred to as a sixth borough are locations as diverse as Beverly Hills, California, and Nashville, Tennessee.

=== Philadelphia ===
Philadelphia has been cited as a "sixth borough" due to its proximity to New York and the movement of New York residents to Philadelphia for various reasons, including lower rent prices and a generally lower cost of living. The nickname has been met with apprehension by both Philadelphia and New York publications. Some have even disputed inaccurate reporting about Philadelphia by New York–based reporters.

=== China ===
Foreign countries, such as China, have also been referred to as a "sixth borough." In China's instance, it is referred to as the "sixth borough" by some media because many Chinese companies invest in developments in Brooklyn, such as Pacific Park.

== Other uses ==
Manhattan University, located in Riverdale, Bronx, refers to its Jaspers student cheering section as "The 6th Borough" at home basketball games played in Draddy Gymnasium. In addition, the University of Connecticut (UConn) has often promoted its Huskies sports teams, especially in men's basketball, as "the Sixth Borough", given the dominance of that team in games played at Madison Square Garden. UConn also sells a T-shirt making this claim. Similarly, Syracuse University has often promoted its Orange sports teams, especially its football team, as the "Sixth Borough," due partly to the Orange playing a "home away from home" game every few years at Yankee Stadium, the fact that Syracuse's colors of blue and orange can be found on the New York City flag, and, in the years all six home games are played in Syracuse, their Senior Day game is attended by large numbers of New Yorkers and Long Islanders.

Jonathan Safran Foer published a short story about a fictional sixth borough, an island that gradually floated away. The story was featured in his novel Extremely Loud & Incredibly Close.

A parallel concept in France is the "21st arrondissement of Paris", while in the United Kingdom, the City of London is sometimes thought of as the "33rd borough of London", although it is not, strictly speaking, a borough. In the western United States, the equivalent is the "Eleventh region of Los Angeles"; notable "eleventh regions" include San Diego, Las Vegas, South Florida, Atlanta, Nashville, Vancouver and the Twin Cities. In addition, the Canadian equivalent is the "Seventh municipality of Toronto," while the Mexican equivalent is the "17a demarcacion territorial de Mexico."
