= Yonkers, New York =

City in the United States

- City
- Corporation of the City of Yonkers
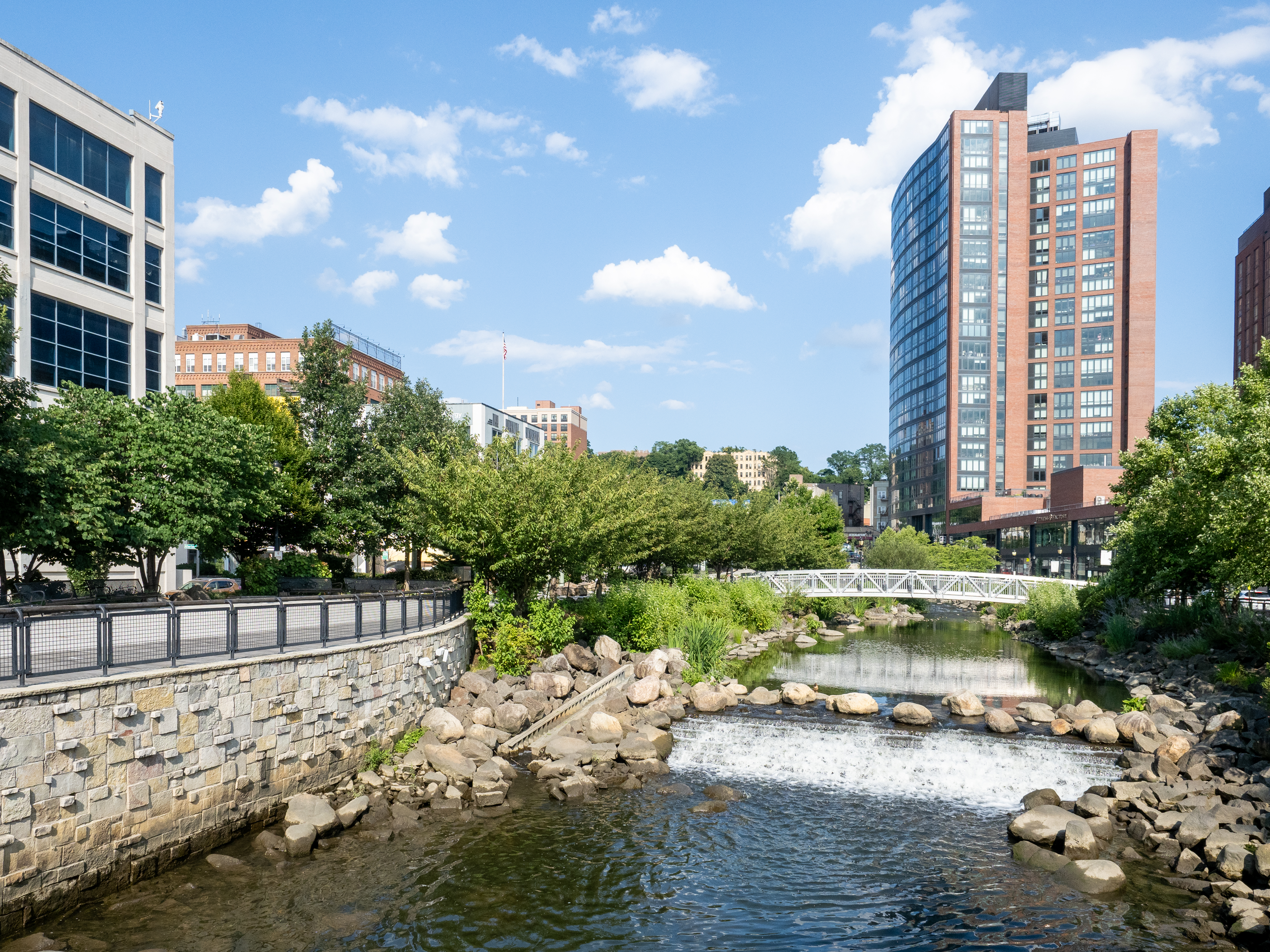
- The daylighted Saw Mill River at Getty Square (2023)

- Flag Seal
- Nicknames: The Central City, The City of Gracious Living, The City of Seven Hills, The City with Vision, The Sixth Borough, The Terrace City
- Location of Yonkers in Westchester County, New York
- Interactive map of Yonkers, New York
- Coordinates: 40°56′29″N 73°51′52″W
- Country: United States
- State: New York
- County: Westchester
- Founded: 1646 (village)
- Incorporated: 1872 (city)
- Named for: Jonkheer Adriaen van der Donck

Government
  - Type: Strong mayor–council
  - Body: Yonkers City Council
  - Mayor: Mike Spano (D)
  - City Council: Members: Lakisha Collins-Bellamy (D) City Council President; Corazon Pineda Issac (D) Majority Leader; John Rubbo (D); Shanae Williams (D); Tasha Diaz (D); Mike Breen (R) Minority Leader; Anthony Merante (R)

Area
  - Total: 20.27 sq mi (52.49 km^{2})
  - Land: 18.00 sq mi (46.63 km^{2})
  - Water: 2.26 sq mi (5.85 km^{2})
- Elevation: 82 ft (25 m)

Population (2020)
  - Total: 211,569
  - Rank: US: 115th NY: 3rd
  - Density: 11,750.1/sq mi (4,536.75/km^{2})
- Demonym(s): Yonkersonian; Yonkersite; Yonker; Yonk
- Time zone: UTC−5 (EST)
  - Summer (DST): UTC−4 (EDT)
- ZIP Codes: 10701, 10702 (post office), 10703–10705, 10707 (shared with Tuckahoe, NY), 10708 (shared with Bronxville, NY), 10710, 10583 (shared with Scarsdale, NY)
- Area code: 914
- FIPS code: 36-84000
- GNIS feature ID: 0971828
- Website: yonkersny.gov

Yonkers (/ˈjɒŋkərz/) is a city in Westchester County, New York, United States. With a population of 211,569 at the 2020 census, its highest decennial census count ever, Yonkers is the third-most populous city in New York state and the most populous city in Westchester County. Yonkers is classified as an inner suburb of New York City, immediately north of the Bronx and approximately 2.4 miles (4 km) north of Marble Hill (the northernmost point in Manhattan).

Yonkers is a centrally located municipality within the New York metropolitan area. Downtown Yonkers is centered on Getty Square, where the municipal government is located. The downtown area, which also houses local businesses and nonprofit organizations, is a retail hub for the city and the northwest Bronx. Major shopping areas are in Getty Square on South Broadway, at the Cross County Shopping Center and the Ridge Hill Mall, and along Central Park Avenue.

The city has a number of attractions, including Tibbetts Brook Park, Untermyer Park and Gardens, the Hudson River Museum, the Saw Mill River, the Science Barge, Sherwood House, and access to the Hudson River. Yonkers is also known as the City of Seven Hills: Park, Nodine, Ridge, Cross, Locust, Glen, and Church Hills. The city has continued to experience significant gentrification in the 21st century.

== Name ==
The area was granted to Adriaen van der Donck, the patroon of Colen Donck, in July 1645. Van der Donck was known locally as Jonkheer, 'young gentleman', an honorific title derived from the Dutch jonk, 'young', and heer, 'lord'. The title, similar to esquire, is linguistically comparable to the German Junker. Jonkheer was shortened to Jonker (possessive Jonkers), from which the name Yonkers derives. The city's residents are known as Yonkersonians, Yonkersites, Yonkers, or Yonks.

== History ==
=== Early settlements ===
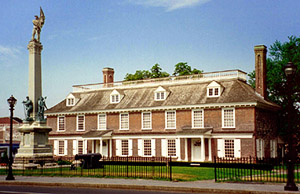
Philipse Manor Hall State Historic Site

The indigenous Native American village of Nappeckamack was located near the Neperah stream (now the Saw Mill River, also known as Nepperhan Creek), which flowed into the Shatemuck (Hudson River). The land on which the city is built was once part of Colen Donck, a 24,000-acre (97-square-kilometer) Dutch land grant. It ran 12 miles (19 km) north from the present-day Manhattan–Bronx border at Marble Hill, and from the Hudson River east to the Bronx River.

Adriaen van der Donck (d. 1655) built a saw mill near the confluence of Nepperhan Creek and the Hudson River. Near the site of Van der Donck's mill is the Philipse Manor Hall State Historic Site. The original structure was built by white workers and enslaved people for Frederick Philipse and his wife, Margaret Hardenbroeck de Vries, around 1682. Philipse was a wealthy Dutchman who, at his death, had amassed an estate which included what is now New York's borough of the Bronx, the city of Yonkers, and much of southern Westchester County. By the mid-18th century, the Philipse family had one of the largest manors and slave-holdings in the colonial North.

Philipse's great-grandson, Frederick Philipse III, was a prominent loyalist during the American Revolution who had economic and political ties to English businesspeople. Because of his political leanings, he fled to England. The New York revolutionary government confiscated and sold all lands and property belonging to the Philipse family. Today, the Enslaved Africans' Raingarden on the Yonkers waterfront preserves the memory of victims of the slave trade in Yonkers and Westchester County. Both the Philipse Manor Hall and the Raingarden are tour stops on the African American Heritage Trail of Westchester County. The home of one of Philipse's tenant farmers, Sherwood House, is a museum operated by the Yonkers Historical Society.

=== Gentrification and redlining ===
Yonkers has undergone several changes to neighborhoods in an effort to revitalize the city, which has included gentrification. Changes were made to its waterfront, which included revitalizing its green space.

Residents of the western area of downtown Yonkers opposed the Pierpointe, a condominium-complex development proposal that would build over 1,900 condominiums (including six 38-story towers), during the 1980s struggle against segregation. According to critics, the development would bring homelessness and gentrification to the area.

Downtown gentrification has raised concerns that poorer residents might be forced out of the city. A Yonkers Arts Gallery painting, But It's Ours: The Redline Between Poverty and Wealth by Shanequa Benitez, illustrates the effects of gentrification on Yonkers.

In an effort to combat redlining, the city announced the Yonkers Greenway: a $14 million rail trail along former railways such as the New York and Putnam Railroad. The 3.1-mile (5.0 km) greenway will run from Van Cortlandt Park to Getty Square. Construction is planned to be completed in 2026.

=== Incorporation and growth ===
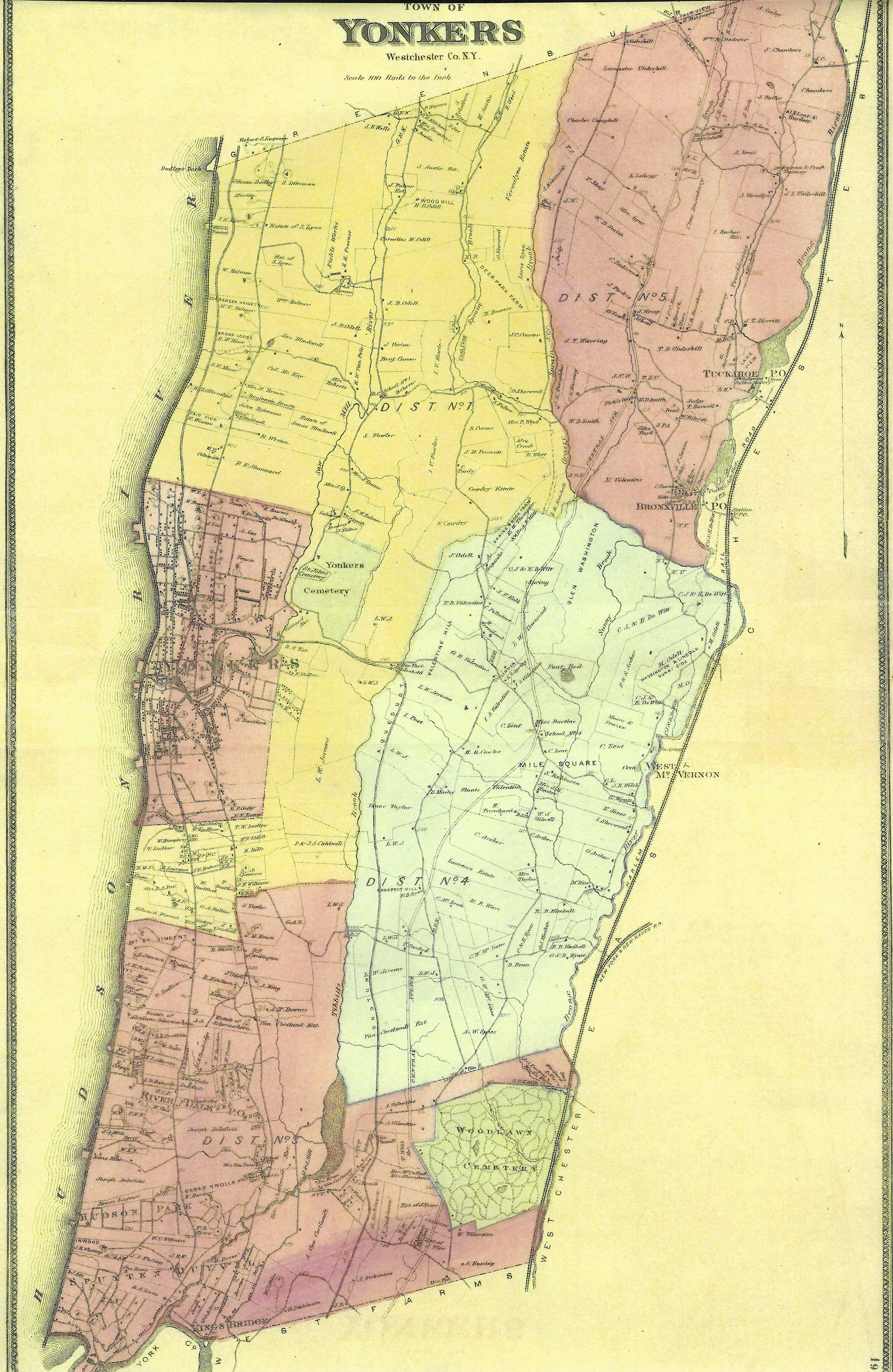
Yonkers in 1867, including the small Village of Yonkers; southern Yonkers was annexed by New York City in 1874.

The Village of Yonkers was incorporated in the western Town of Yonkers in 1854, and incorporated as a city in 1872. In 1873, the southern Town of Yonkers (outside the City of Yonkers) became the Town of Kingsbridge; this included Woodlawn Cemetery and the present-day neighborhoods of Kingsbridge, Riverdale, and Woodlawn Heights. The Town of Kingsbridge was annexed by New York City the following year as part of the Bronx. In 1898, Yonkers, Brooklyn, Queens, and Staten Island voted on a referendum to determine if they wanted to become part of New York City. Although the referendum passed elsewhere, Yonkers and neighboring Mount Vernon were not included in the consolidated city and remained independent. Some residents call Yonkers "the sixth borough" because of its location on the New York City border, its urban character, and the merger referendum.

A 1942 subway connection was planned between Getty Square and the IRT Broadway–Seventh Avenue Line, which terminates in Riverdale at 242nd Street (slightly south of the city line). The plan was dropped.

In 1937, a 175-foot (53 m) water tower collapsed in the Nodine Hills area; nine people were initially injured. The injury total increased by three after the collapse, bringing the number to 12. About 100,000 U.S. gallons (380,000 L) of water from the tower spilled, causing flooding in the area that crushed cars and damaged homes. Construction of a new tower began in 1938, and it became operational the following year.

=== Wartime ===
During the American Civil War, 254 Yonkers residents joined the U.S. Army and Navy. They enlisted primarily in four regiments: the 6th New York Heavy Artillery, the 5th New York Volunteer Infantry, the 17th New York Volunteers, and the 15th NY National Guard. During the New York City draft riots, Yonkers formed the Home Guards. The guards were a force of constables formed to protect Yonkers from rioting, which was feared to spread from New York City (it did not). Seventeen Yonkers residents were killed during the Civil War. A towering Sailors and Soldiers Memorial, dedicated in 1891, is located on the grounds of Philipse Manor Hall State Historic Site.

During World War I, 6,909 Yonkers residents (about seven percent of the city's population) entered military service. Most Yonkers men joined the 27th Division or the 77th Division. One hundred thirty-seven city residents were killed during the war. In the 1918 sinking of the USS President Lincoln, seventeen sailors from Yonkers survived. Civilians helped the war effort by joining organizations such as the American Red Cross. The Yonkers chapter of the Red Cross had 126 members in 1916; by the end of the war, 15,358 Yonkers residents belonged to the chapter. Mostly women, they prepared surgical dressings, created hospital garments for the wounded, and knit articles of clothing for refugees and soldiers. In addition to joining the Red Cross, Yonkers residents donated $19,255,255 to a number of war drives.

The city's factories were converted to produce items for World War II, such as tents and blankets from the Alexander Smith and Sons carpet factory and tanks from the Otis Elevator factory. Increased competition from less-expensive imports resulted in a decline in manufacturing in Yonkers after the war, and a number of industrial jobs were lost.

=== Industry ===
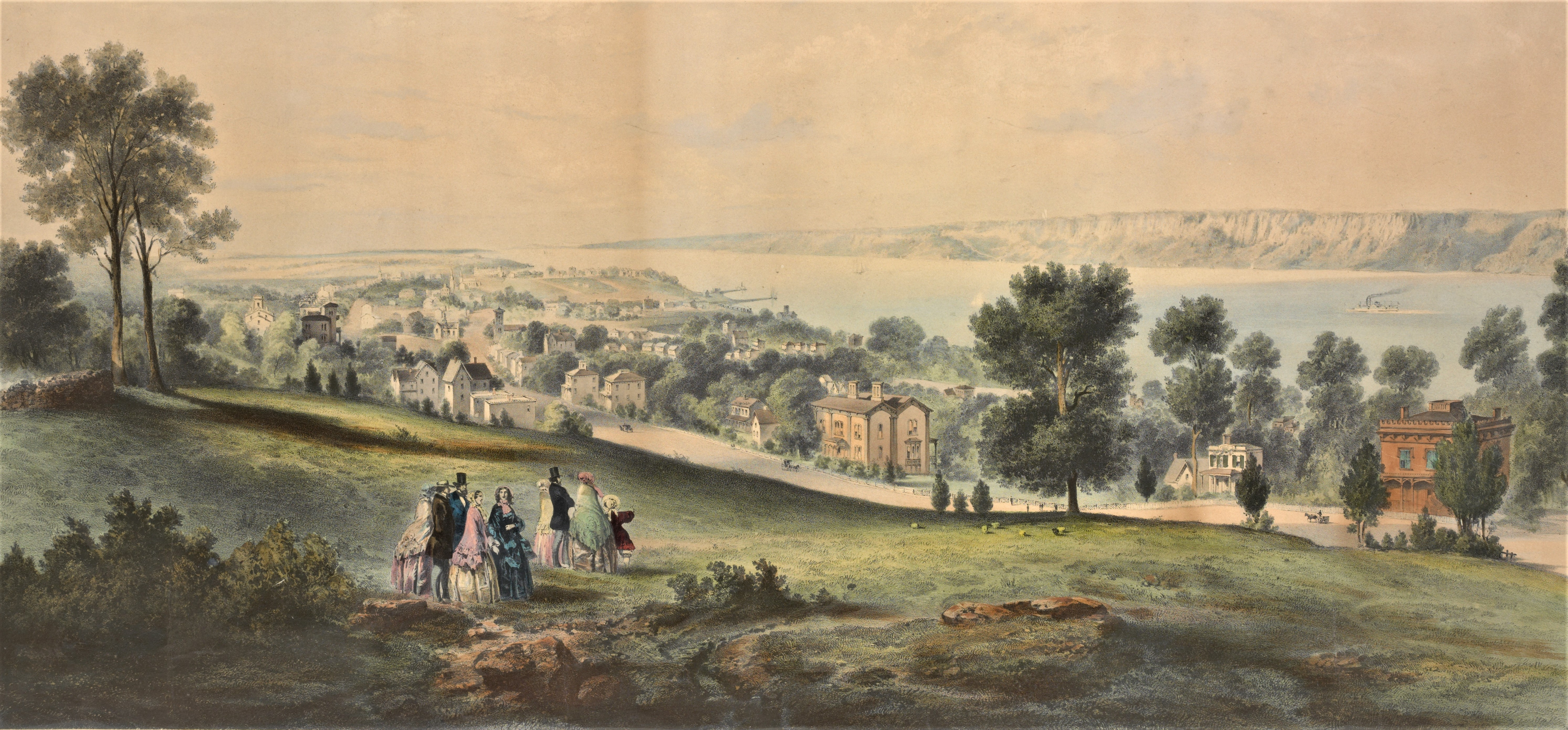
Yonkers c. 1860s

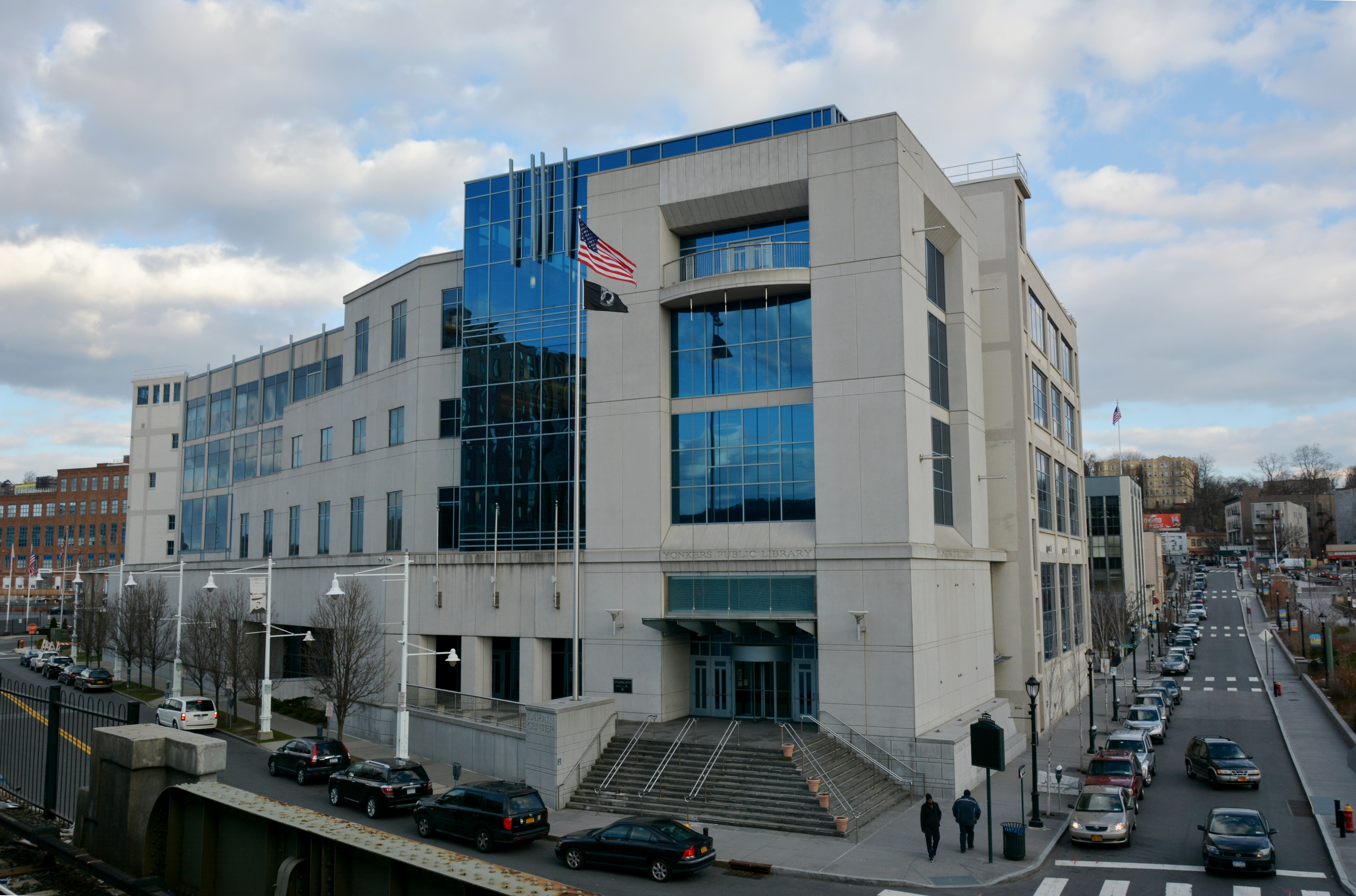
The Yonkers Public Library in December 2014

Yonkers was originally a small farming town which produced peaches, apples, potatoes, oats, wheat, and other agricultural goods to be shipped to New York City along the Hudson River. Water power created manufacturing jobs. Elisha Otis invented a safety elevator in 1853, and the Otis Elevator Company opened the world's first elevator factory on the Hudson near present-day Vark Street. The company moved to larger quarters during the 1880s, which later became the Yonkers Public Library. The Woman's Institute of Yonkers, established in 1880 as the Free Circulating Library for Self-Supporting Women, is the city' s oldest social service agency.

Around that time, the Alexander Smith and Sons Carpet Company in the Saw Mill River Valley expanded to 45 buildings, 800 looms, and more than 4,000 workers. It was known as one of the world's premier carpet-producing centers.

In addition to manufacturing, Yonkers played a key role in the development of recreational sports in the United States. Scottish-born John Reid founded Saint Andrew's Golf Club in the city in 1888; it was the first golf course in the United States. That year, the New York City and Northern Railway Company (later the New York Central Railroad) connected Yonkers to Manhattan and points north. A three-mile spur to Getty Square operated until 1943. Bakelite, the first completely-synthetic plastic, was invented c. 1907 in Yonkers by Leo Baekeland and was manufactured there until the late 1920s.

During the early 20th century, Yonkers hosted the Brass-Era automaker Colt Runabout. Although the vehicle reportedly ran well, the company went out of business. Yonkers was the headquarters of hat manufacturer Waring Hat Company, which was the largest in the nation when it opened. On January 4, 1940, Yonkers resident Edwin Howard Armstrong transmitted the first FM radio broadcast on the W2XCR station from the Yonkers home of co-experimenter C. R. Runyon. Yonkers had the longest-running pirate radio station, which was owned by Allan Weiner and operated during the 1970s and 1980s.

The Alexander Smith Carpet Company, one of the city's largest employers, ceased operations during a June 1954 labor dispute. In 1983, the Otis Elevator factory closed. A Kawasaki railcar-assembly plant opened in 1986 in the former Otis plant. With the loss of manufacturing jobs, Yonkers became a commuter town. Some neighborhoods, such as Crestwood and Park Hill, became popular with wealthy New Yorkers who wanted to live outside Manhattan without giving up urban conveniences. Yonkers's transportation infrastructure, which included three commuter railroad lines and five parkways and thruways, made it a desirable city in which to live. A 15-minute drive from Manhattan, it has a number of prewar homes and apartment buildings. Yonkers's manufacturing sector has also revived during the early 21st century. In 2024, Kawasaki rail reached a milestone with its 5,000th railway car.

=== Racial discrimination and United States v. Yonkers ===
In 1960, the population of Yonkers was 95.8 percent white and four percent Black. The city developed a national reputation for racial tension during the 1980s and 1990s, based on a long-term battle between the city and the NAACP over the construction of subsidized, low-income housing projects. Yonkers planned to use federal funding for urban renewal exclusively downtown; other groups, led by the NAACP, believed that the resulting concentration of low-income housing in traditionally-poor neighborhoods would perpetuate poverty. Although the city had been warned in 1971 by the United States Department of Housing and Urban Development about further construction of low-income housing in west Yonkers, it continued to support subsidized housing in this area between 1972 and 1977.

In 1980, the NAACP and the federal government filed suit against the city of Yonkers and its board of education in United States v. Yonkers. After a 1985 decision and an unsuccessful appeal, Yonkers's schools were integrated three years later. According to a ruling by federal judge Leonard B. Sand, Yonkers engaged in institutional segregation in housing and educational policies for more than 40 years. He connected the city's opposition to ending racial segregation from its public schools to the unlawful concentration of public housing and discrimination in private housing.

Yonkers gained national and international attention during the summer of 1988, when it backed out of its previous agreement to build municipal public housing in the eastern parts of the city (an agreement it had made in a consent decree after losing its appeal in 1987). After its reversal, the city was found in contempt of the federal courts. Sand imposed a fine on Yonkers which began at $100 and doubled every day, capped at $1 million per day by an appeals court, until the city capitulated to the federally-mandated plan. The city remained in contempt of court until September 9, 1988, when its city council relented as the financial impact threatened to close a library and reduce sanitation. The city also considered massive layoffs, which would have adversely affected its ability to provide services to the upper classes it was trying to retain. Nicholas C. Wasicsko, Yonkers's youngest mayor (elected at age 28), struggled in city politics. He helped end the city's contempt-of-court ruling, but was voted out of office as a result. Wasicsko's story, subject of the 2015 miniseries Show Me a Hero, was adapted from a 1999 nonfiction book of the same name by Lisa Belkin. The 2007 documentary Brick by Brick: A Civil Rights Story also covers racial discrimination and housing segregation in Yonkers.

As a result of the federal lawsuit, Yonkers's public-school enrollment dropped from 54 percent of the city's eligible population to under 30 percent as thousands of white families left the city for its suburbs or enrolled their children in private schools; this effectively gutted the city's middle class and tax base. The school district's estimated cost of integration was over $262 million. Forced to cut programs, Yonkers schools fell steeply in national rankings as test scores sharply declined. By 1995, The New York Times called the city's desegregation effort "a profound disappointment to blacks and whites alike". Michael Sussmann, the NAACP's lawyer during the case, blamed Sand for failing to allocate federal funds to help relieve the cost of integration.

=== 21st century ===
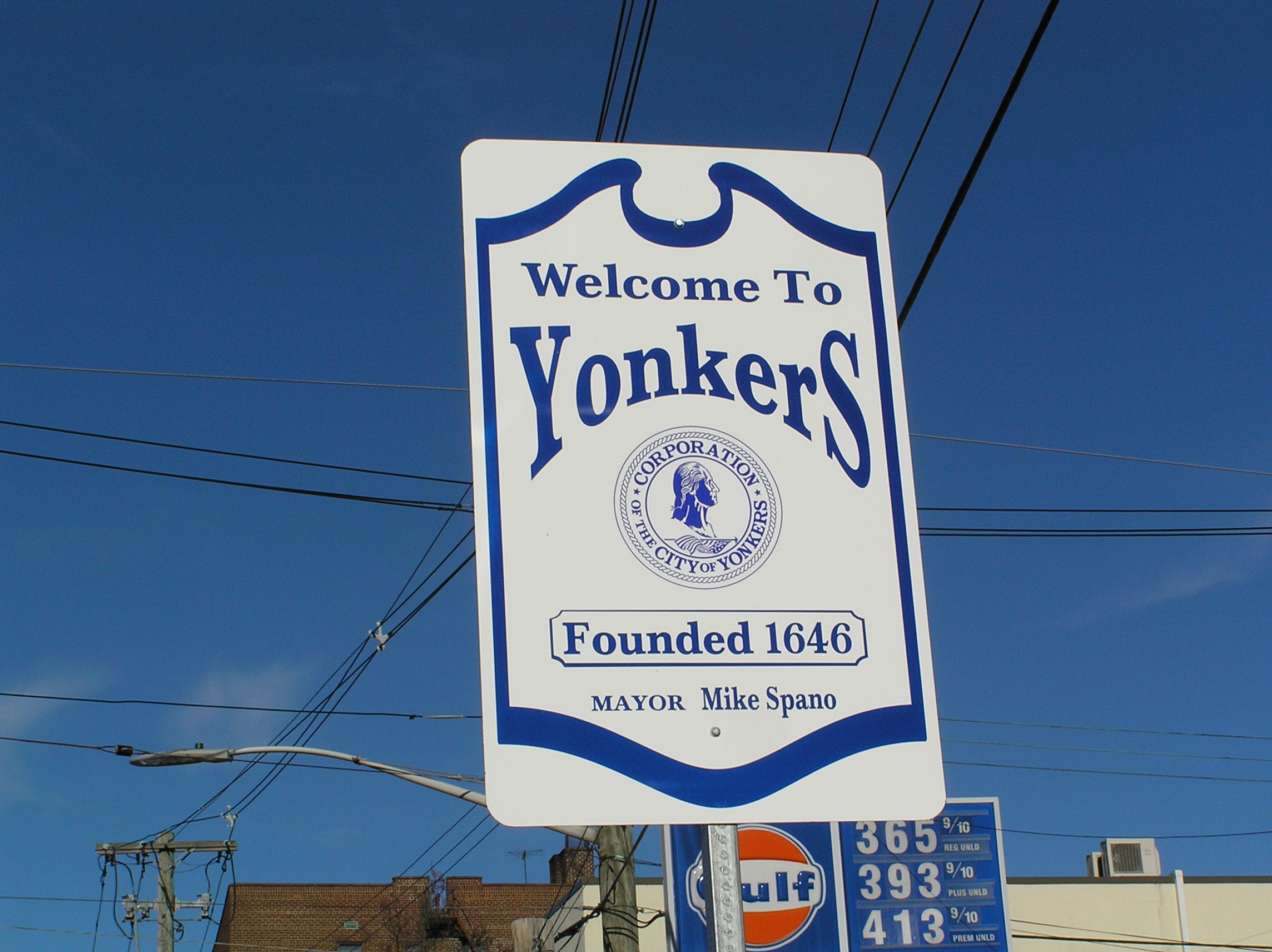
Welcome sign on northbound Riverdale Avenue at the Bronx line (2013)

Areas of Yonkers which bordered similar neighborhoods in Riverdale began seeing an influx of Orthodox Jews during the 2000s, and the Riverdale Hatzalah volunteer ambulance service began serving neighborhoods in the southwest part of the city. The Sherwood Park Cemetery is a small Jewish cemetery.

Two former Alexander Smith and Sons Carpet Company loft buildings (at 540 and 578 Nepperhan Avenue) have been repurposed to house the YoHo Artist Community, which has private studios there. Yonkers Raceway, a harness racing track, renovated its grounds and clubhouse and added video slot machines in 2006 to become Yonkers Raceway & Empire City Casino. MGM Resorts International bought the raceway and casino in 2018 for $850 million.

During the COVID-19 pandemic, the city opened several test sites at the ParkCare Pavilion of St. John's Riverside Hospital (considered a COVID-19 hotspot). The test site was operated by the New York State Department of Health during the pandemic. More test sites opened in the city as students prepared to return to school for in-person instruction.

In February 2023, the Yonkers City Council approved the US Post Office on Main Street for local-landmark status after its 1989 listing on the National Register of Historic Places in 1989. On September 29, 2023, a state of emergency was declared in the city after flash flooding affected most of the Hudson Valley and New York City. Most area parkways were closed and flooding was also reported in neighboring Mount Vernon. After the flooding, crews pumped water out of Yonkers homes.

The city has been used as a location for films and television series, and the City Hall courtroom is used for film scenes and commercials. The city along with neighboring Mount Vernon saw an increase in revenue grow from 2016. Catch Me If You Can (2002) and Mona Lisa Smile (2003) were partially filmed in the city. Yonkers is the setting of two feature films by local filmmaker Robert Celestino: Mr. Vincent (1997) and Yonkers Joe (2008). The city is the setting for the 2005 film A Tale of Two Pizzas, and Tyler, the Creator released "Yonkers" in 2011. Neil Simon's play, Lost in Yonkers, and its film version are set in the city. A new Lionsgate Studios facility hosts the Spanish multimedia communications group Mediapro, and a planned $500 million expansion would make it the largest such facility in the Northeast.

On May 27, 2026, the Yonkers City Council unanimously voted to rename the intersection of School Street and Brooke Street as "Earl DMX Simmons Way."

== Geography ==
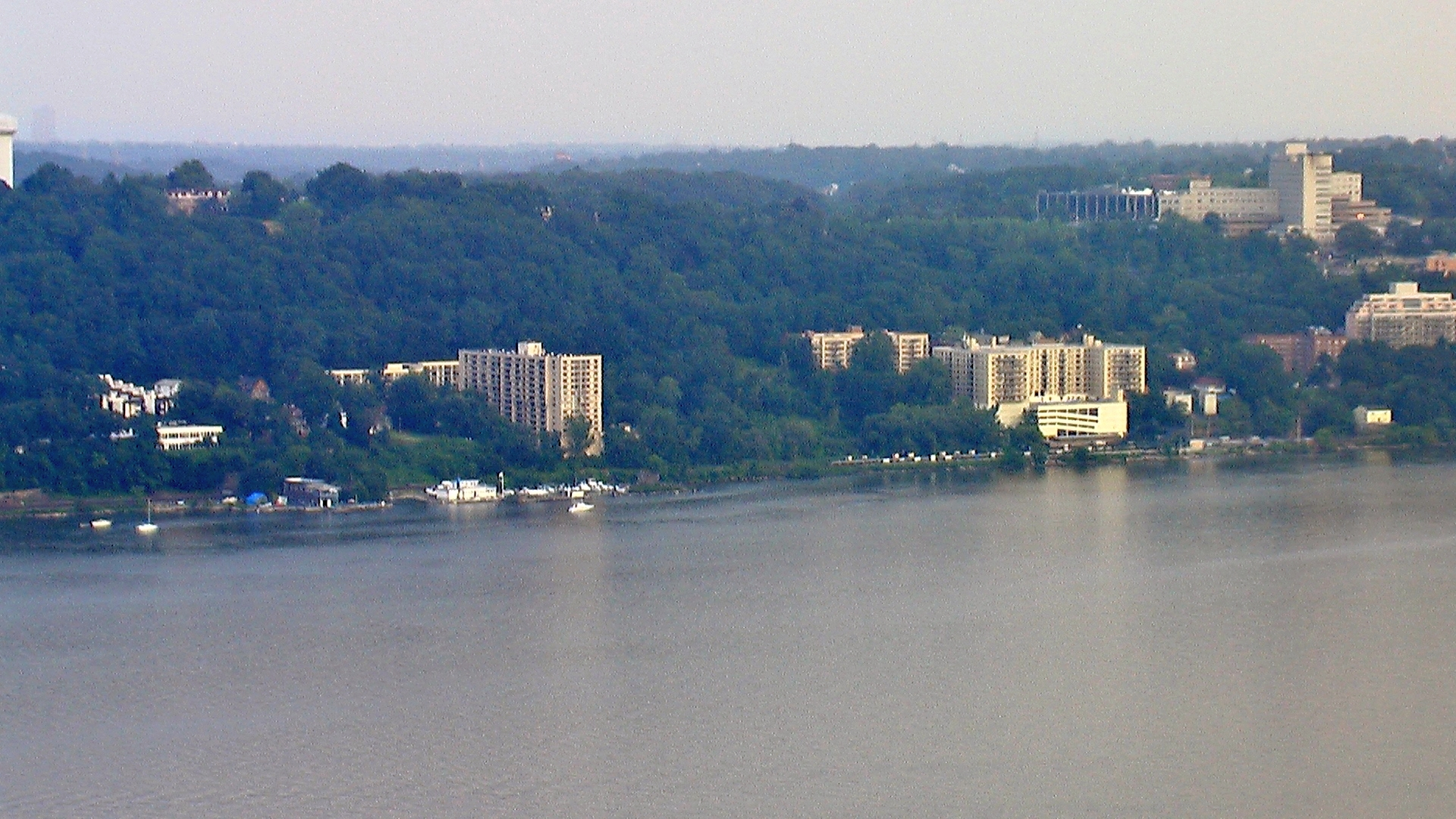
The Yonkers waterfront, including high-rise apartments along the Hudson River in the city's northwest

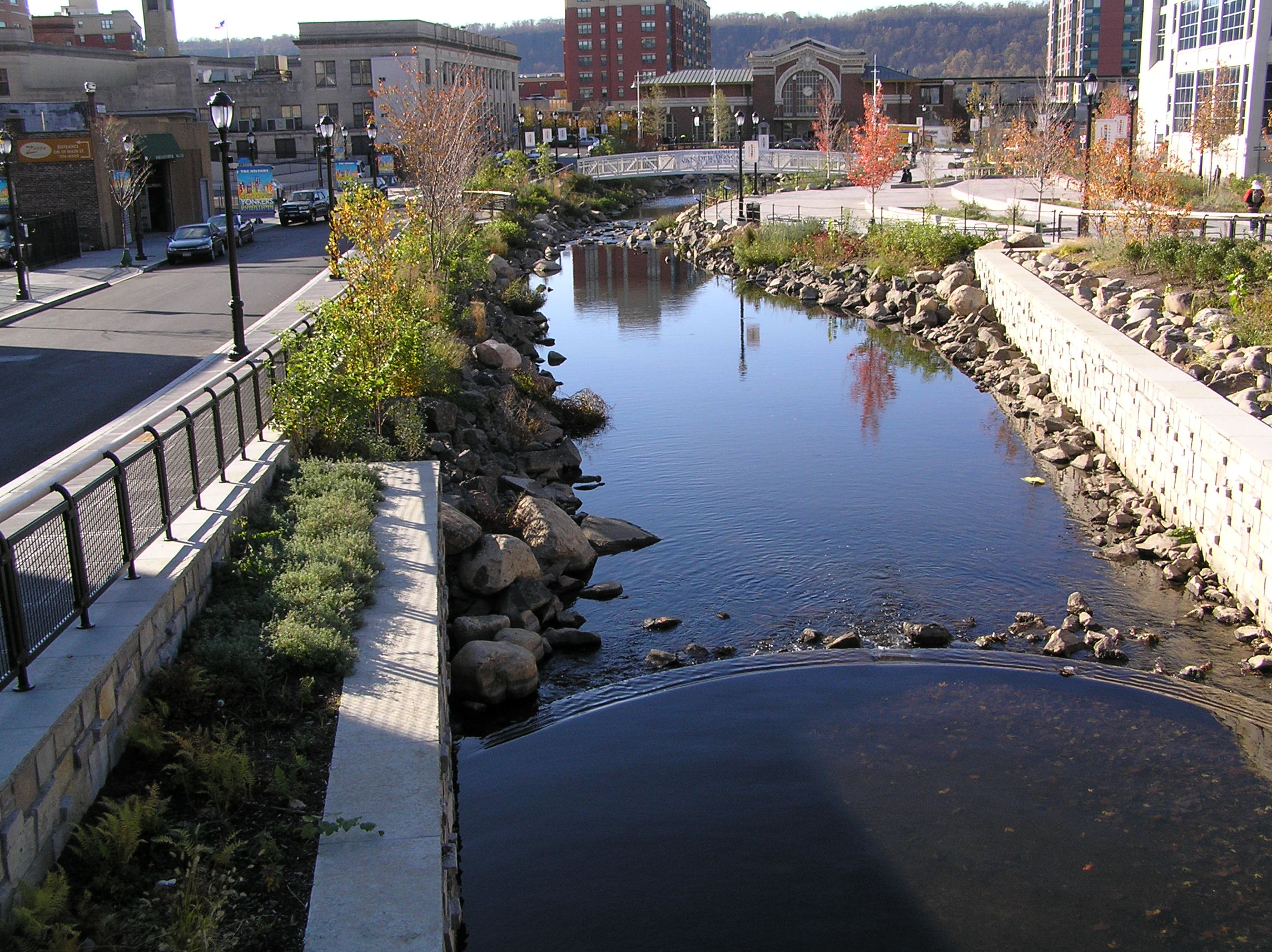
The Saw Mill River at Getty Square in 2012

Yonkers covers an area of 20.3 square miles (53 km^{2}), including 18.1 square miles (47 km^{2}) of land and 2.2 square miles (5.7 km^{2}) of water. On the east, the Bronx River separates Yonkers from Mount Vernon, Tuckahoe, Eastchester, Bronxville, and Scarsdale. The town of Greenburgh is on the north, and the Hudson River forms the western border. Yonkers borders the Riverdale, Woodlawn, and Wakefield sections of The Bronx from the south. The city is spread over hills rising from near sea level on the east bank of the Hudson River to 416 feet (127 m) above sea level at Sacred Heart Church, whose spire can be seen from Long Island, New York City, and New Jersey.

Yonkers is considered a City of Seven Hills: Park, Nodine, Ridge, Cross, Locust, Glen, and Church Hills. Much of the city developed around the Saw Mill River, which enters Yonkers from the north and flows into the Hudson River at Getty Square. Portions of the river had been buried in flumes under parking lots, but have been uncovered (daylighted). Daylighting promotes the restoration of habitat for plants, fish, and other fauna, and helps develop an understanding of where Native Americans camped in spring and summer.

== Demographics ==
Historical population
Census	Pop.	Note	%±
1860	8,218		—
1870	12,733		54.9%
1880	18,892		48.4%
1890	32,033		69.6%
1900	47,931		49.6%
1910	79,803		66.5%
1920	100,176		25.5%
1930	134,646		34.4%
1940	142,598		5.9%
1950	152,798		7.2%
1960	190,634		24.8%
1970	204,297		7.2%
1980	195,351		−4.4%
1990	188,082		−3.7%
2000	196,086		4.3%
2010	195,976		−0.1%
2020	211,569		8.0%
Historical sources: 1790–1990

Yonkers is the third-most populous city in New York State. In the 2018 American Community Survey, 34.8 percent of Yonkers residents spoke Spanish and 4.2 percent of the population was West Indian. Yonkers has a sizeable Arab population, mainly from the Levant (especially Jordanians and Palestinians). There is also a sizeable Albanian population in the city.

In the 2010 census, there were 195,976 people in Yonkers and its population density was 10,827.4 people per square mile (4,180.5 people/km^{2}). There were 80,839 housing units, with an average density of 4,466.2 per square mile (1,724.4/km^{2}). The racial makeup of the city was 55.8 percent white, 18.7 percent African American, 0.7 percent Native American, 5.9 percent Asian, 0.1 percent Pacific Islander, 14.7 percent from other races, and 4.1 percent from two or more races. Hispanics or Latinos of any racial background were 34.7 percent of the population. Non-Hispanic whites were 41.4 percent of the population in 2010, down from 89.9 percent in 1970.

Data from the 2020 census indicated that Yonkers's population grew by eight percent from 2010 to 2020, an increase from 195,976 to 211,569. Yonkers surpassed Rochester as the third-most populous city in New York, behind New York City and Buffalo. The Hispanic population increased, as the non-Hispanic population decreased to 33 percent from 41.4 percent in 2010. The Hispanic and Latino population increased to 40 percent, and the Asian population increased to 5.9%. The city reported a decrease in its white population from 55.8 to 46.3 percent.

Historical racial profile	2020	2010	1990	1970	1950
White	46.3%	55.8%	76.2%	92.9%	96.7%
—Non-Hispanic Whites	33%	41.4%	67.1%	89.9%	N/A
Black or African American	18.7%	16.0%	14.1%	6.4%	3.2%
Hispanic or Latino (of any race)	40.0%	34.7%	16.7%	3.5%	N/A
Asian	5.9%	5.8%	3.0%	0.4%	—

=== 2020 census ===
Yonkers city, New York – Racial and ethnic composition Note: the US Census treats Hispanic/Latino as an ethnic category. This table excludes Latinos from the racial categories and assigns them to a separate category. Hispanics/Latinos may be of any race.
Race / Ethnicity (NH = Non-Hispanic)	Pop 2000	Pop 2010	Pop 2020	% 2000	% 2010	% 2020
White alone (NH)	99,346	81,163	68,970	50.66%	41.41%	32.60%
Black or African American alone (NH)	30,164	31,297	33,509	15.38%	15.97%	15.84%
Native American or Alaska Native alone (NH)	362	382	330	0.18%	0.19%	0.16%
Asian alone (NH)	9,290	11,370	12,915	4.74%	5.80%	6.10%
Pacific Islander alone (NH)	53	58	34	0.03%	0.03%	0.02%
Other Race alone (NH)	842	714	1,833	0.43%	0.36%	0.87%
Mixed race or Multiracial (NH)	5,177	3,065	4,913	2.64%	1.56%	2.32%
Hispanic or Latino (any race)	50,852	67,927	89,065	25.93%	34.66%	42.10%
Total	196,086	195,976	211,569	100.00%	100.00%	100.00%

== Neighborhoods ==
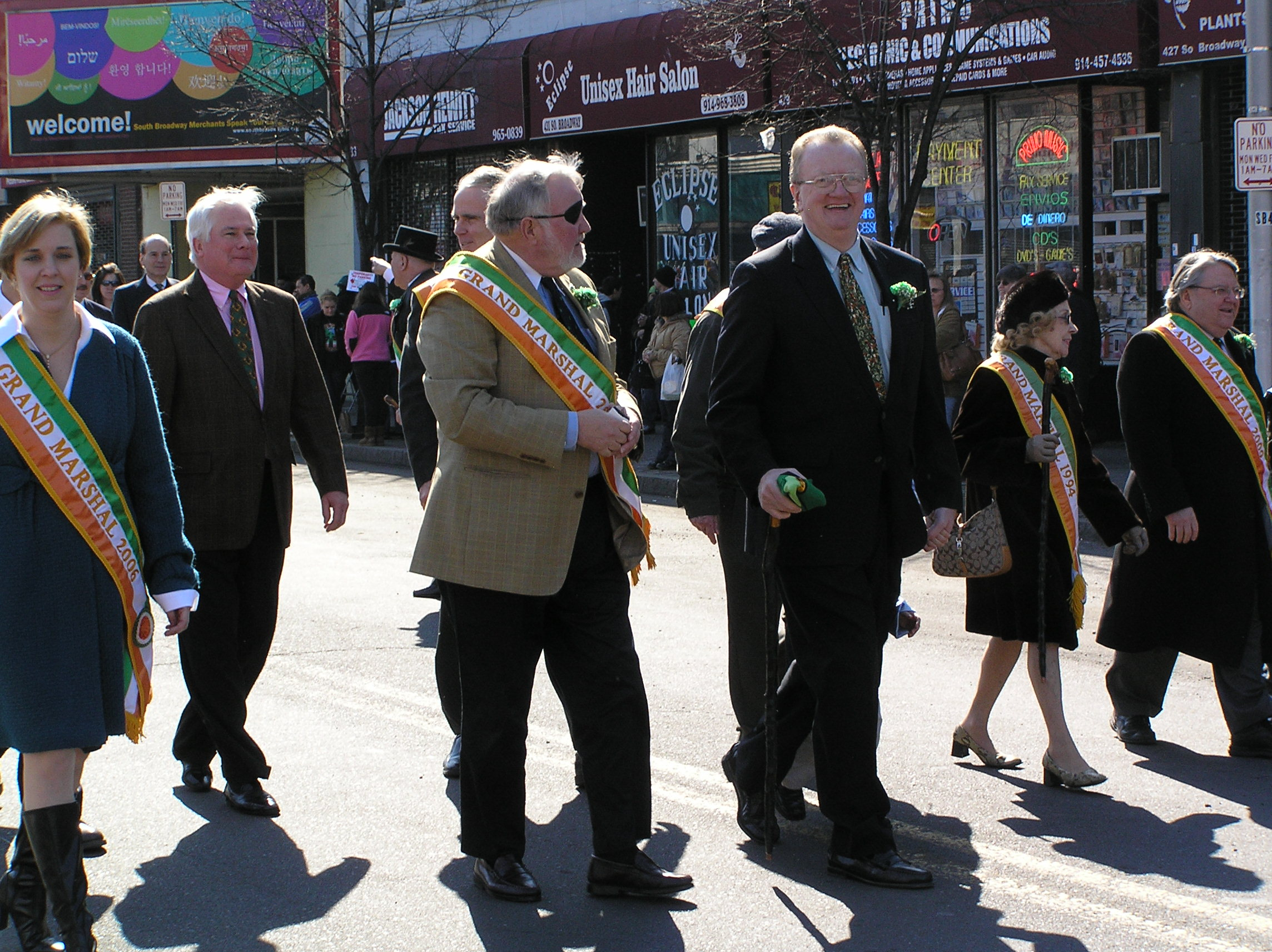
Saint Patrick's Day parade (2010)

Yonkers includes several small residential enclaves and communities which form four quarters, demarcated by the Saw Mill River. There are at least 38 neighborhoods, but many of their original names are rarely used except by older residents and real-estate brokers.

=== Northeast Yonkers ===
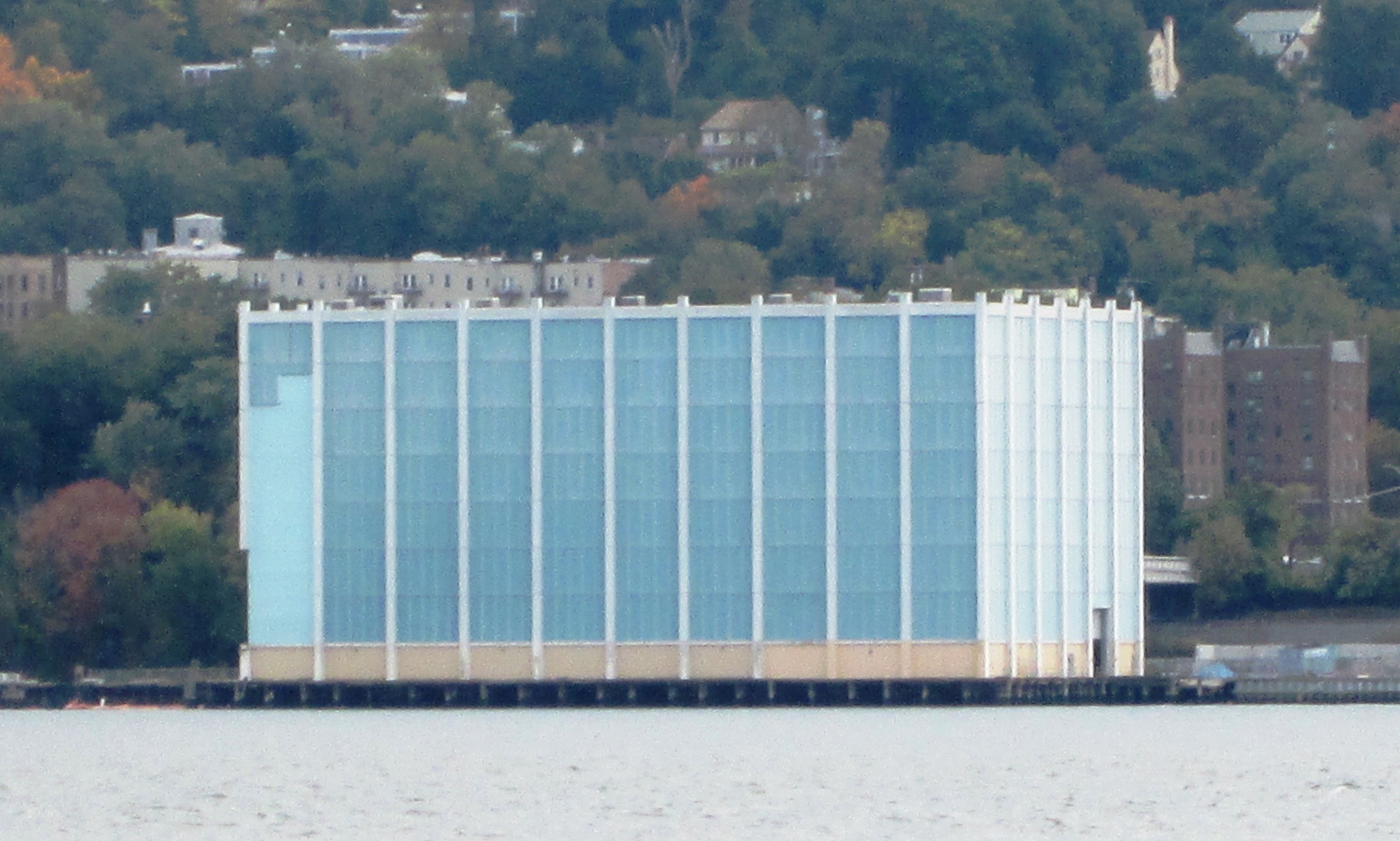
The Blue Cube, a former factory now a television-production facility on the northwest Yonkers waterfront, seen from across the Hudson

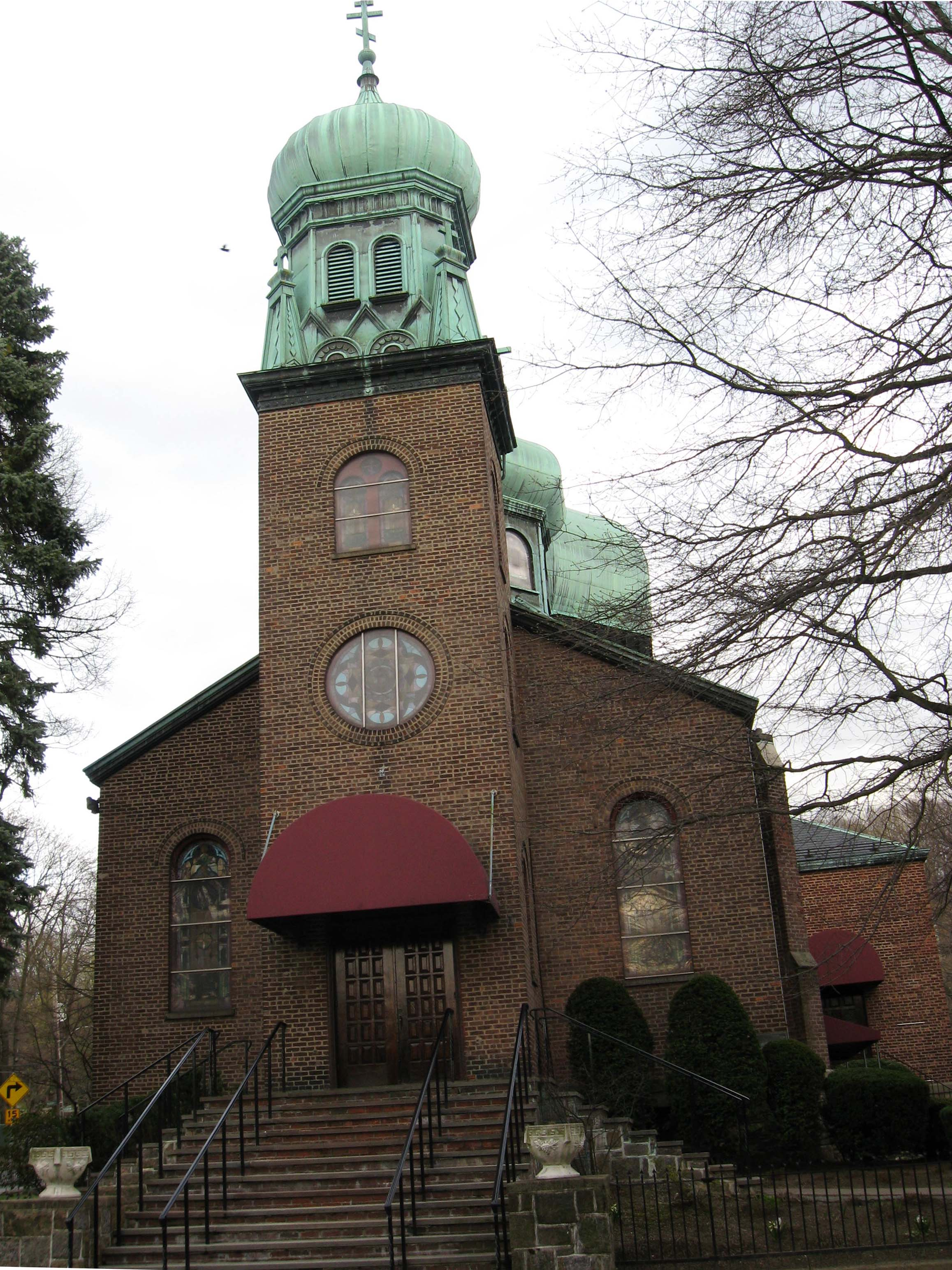
Holy Trinity Russian Orthodox Church

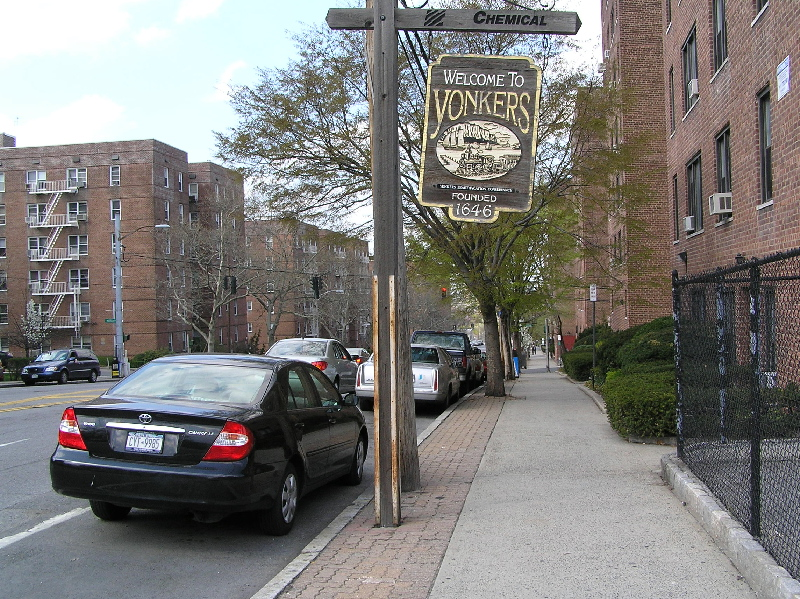
Riverdale Avenue, looking north from the Bronx line

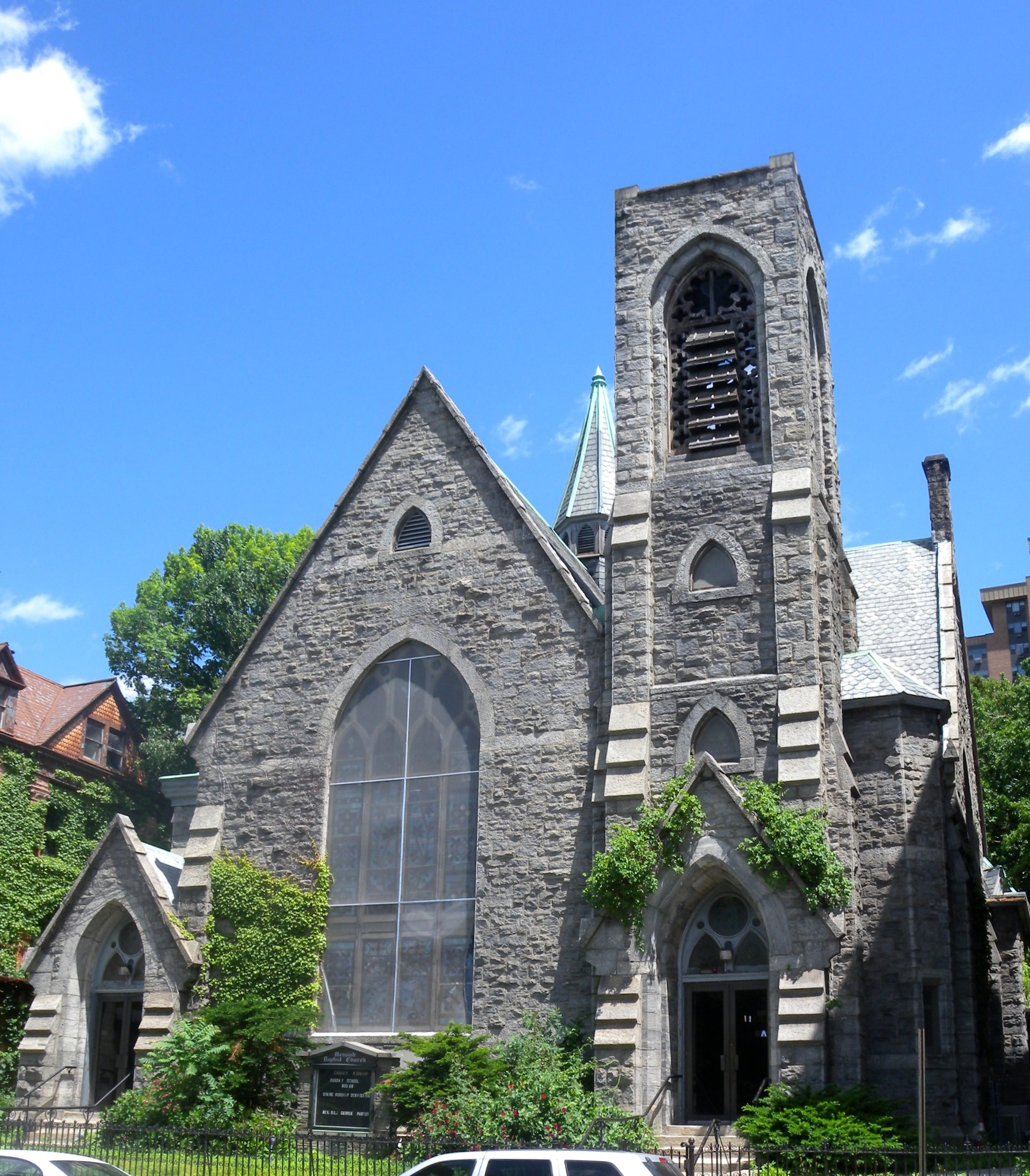
Messiah Baptist Church

Northeast Yonkers is a primarily Irish-American and Italian-American area. House sizes vary, from small houses set close together to larger homes in neighborhoods such as Lawrence Park West and mid-rise apartment buildings along Central Avenue (NY 100). Central Avenue (officially Central Park Avenue) is a shopping area. Notable former residents include Steven Tyler of Aerosmith, whose childhood home was at 100 Pembrook Drive.

The area contains the affluent neighborhoods of Crestwood, Colonial Heights, and Cedar Knolls, and the wealthy enclaves of Beech Hill and Lawrence Park West. It includes a gated community off the eastern Grassy Sprain Reservoir, known as Winchester Villages. Notable places include St. Vladimir's Seminary, Sarah Lawrence College, and the Tanglewood Shopping Center, former home of the Tanglewood Boys gang. The area is also home to the Ridge Hill Mall shopping center, which contains a Legoland Discovery Center Westchester, the first Legoland Discovery Center to open in the Northeast area of the United States. Northeast Yonkers is somewhat more expensive than the rest of the city and, due to the proximity of several Metro-North commuter railroad stations, its residents generally work for Manhattan corporations.

=== Northwest Yonkers ===
Northwest Yonkers neighborhoods vary, spanning from the Hudson River to the New York State Thruway (I-87) and from Ashburton Avenue north to the Hastings-on-Hudson border. With the Hudson River bordering it on the west, northwest Yonkers has many Victorian-era homes with panoramic views of the Palisades. The Victorian architecture and number of 19th-century estates in northwest Yonkers has attracted filmmakers.

An interest in historic preservation has developed, demonstrated on streets such as Shonnard Terrace, Delavan Terrace, and Hudson Terrace. On Delavan Terrace, the 1854 Smith-Collins House was included in a 1983 article in The New York Times. The house was demolished in 2007, and former city-council president Chuck Lesnick called for legislation which would make the demolition of a 75-year-old landmark in the city subject to the landmark-review process.

Neighborhoods include Nepera Park, Runyon Heights, Homefield, Glenwood, and Greystone. Landmarks include the Hudson River Museum, the Lenoir Nature Preserve, and Untermyer Park and Gardens.

The two-block section of Palisade Avenue between Chase and Roberts Avenues in northwest Yonkers is colloquially known as "the north end" or "the end". The only retail area in northwest Yonkers, it was known for its soda fountain, Urich's Stationery, and Robbins Pharmacy. It was the end of a trolley line that has since been replaced by a Bee-line Bus route. Nepperhan Avenue in Nepera Park is a shopping district in the area.

=== Southeast Yonkers ===
Residents of southeast Yonkers are primarily Irish- and Italian-American. A number of recent immigrants from Ireland live in the area. Its architecture more closely resembles that of parts of the Bronx, Brooklyn, Queens, and Staten Island than of points north. Southeast Yonkers is within walking distance of the Woodlawn and Wakefield neighborhoods of the Bronx.

Eastern McLean Avenue, home to an Irish community shared with Woodlawn, is considered the hub of Yonkers by some. A portion of Midland Avenue in the Dunwoodie neighborhood has been called the city's Little Italy. Southeast Yonkers landmarks include the Cross County Shopping Center, Yonkers Raceway and St. Joseph's Seminary in Dunwoodie, which was visited by Pope John Paul II in October 1995 and by Pope Benedict XVI in April 2008.

=== Southwest Yonkers ===
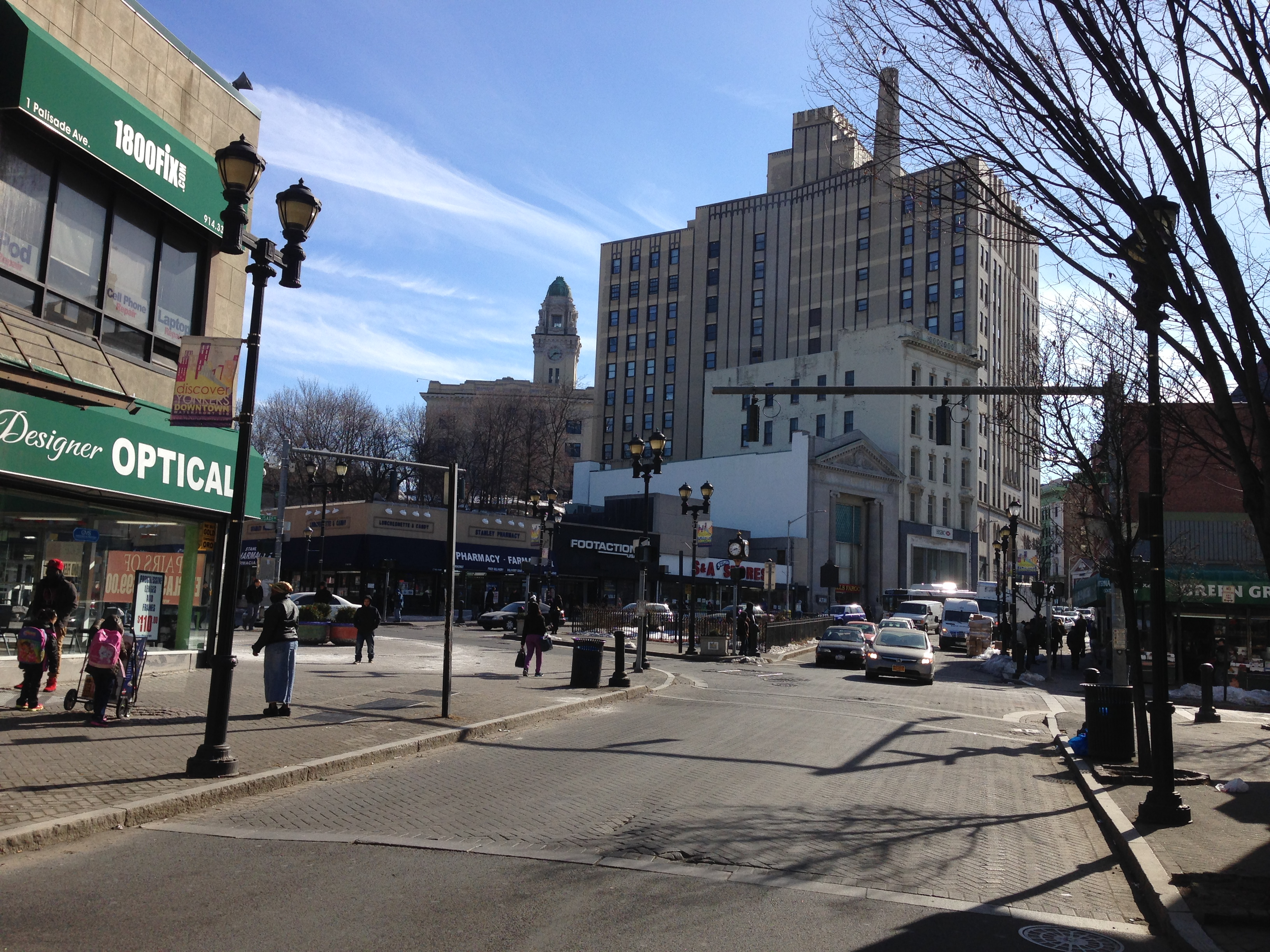
The center of Getty Square

Getty Square is Yonkers's downtown and its civic center and central business district. Much of southwest Yonkers grew along the railroad and trolley (now bus) lines along South Broadway and in Getty Square which run to New York City. Clusters of apartment buildings surrounded the stations of the Yonkers branch of the New York and Putnam Railroad and the Third Avenue Railway trolley lines; these buildings are now served by the Bee-Line Bus System. The railroad companies built neighborhoods of mixed housing which ranged from apartment buildings to large mansions in areas such as Park Hill, where a funicular accessed the train station in the valley.

Off South Broadway and Yonkers Avenue are residential neighborhoods such as Lowerre, Nodine Hill, Park Hill, and Hudson Park. They have a mixture of architectural styles which include dense clusters of apartment buildings, blocks of stores with apartments above, multifamily row houses, and detached single-family homes. The Ludlow Park, Hudson Park, and Van Cortlandt Crest neighborhoods have a larger number of detached houses.

Southwest Yonkers, traditionally home to African American and white residents, has seen an influx of immigrants from Mexico, Central America, the Caribbean, South Asia, and the Middle East. Many residents are of African, Caribbean, Italian, Polish, or Mexican descent. Some neighborhoods on the Riverdale border contain an increasing number of Orthodox Jews.

The area is home to historical and educational institutions which include Philipse Manor Hall, the Science Barge, the Beczak Environmental Education Center, and a 2003 Yonkers Public Library building. The revitalization of Getty Square has helped facilitate the growth of southwest Yonkers. During the early 21st century, several luxury apartment buildings were built along the Hudson River. A Victorian-era pier was renovated, and a new public library was housed in the remodeled Otis Elevator factory. Peter X. Kelly's restaurant, X20 Xaviar's on the Hudson, is on the renovated pier. In 2020, several more rental buildings were placed at the river's edge on Alexander Street. Sawyer Place is an 18-story building on the site of the original old mill. New proposals and current projects are intended to revitalize downtown Yonkers.

== Government ==
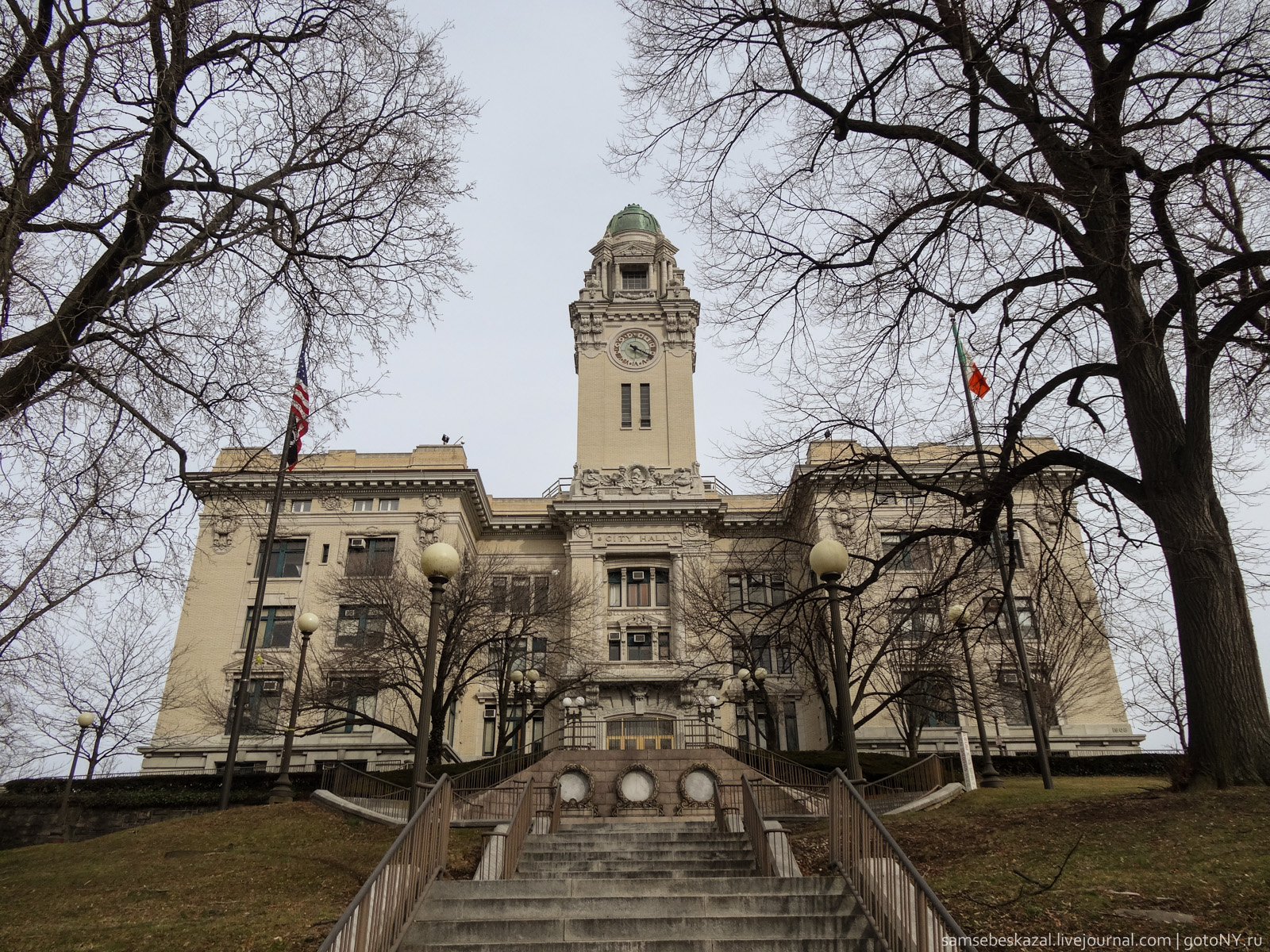
Yonkers City Hall, built between 1907 and 1910, was designed by H. Lansing Quick in Beaux-Arts style.

Phillipse Manor Hall was the site of the first Yonkers Village Hall and City Hall from 1868 to c. 1906. Yonkers is governed by a strong mayor–council system. The Yonkers City Council has seven members: six, elected from each of the six districts, and a president. The mayor and city-council president are elected in a citywide vote. The mayor is Democrat Mike Spano, and the council president is Lakisha Collins-Bellamy.

Yonkers, like the rest of Westchester County and New York state, is a Democratic stronghold at the national level. The city chose George H. W. Bush over Bill Clinton and Ross Perot for president in 1992, but has voted solidly Democratic ever since. Recent mayors have included Republicans Phil Amicone and John Spencer, and the city council has been primarily controlled by Republicans. Yonkers is represented in the State Assembly, by Democrats J. Gary Pretlow and Nader Sayegh, and in the State Senate by Democrats Andrea Stewart-Cousins and Shelley Mayer. In the House of Representatives, Democrat George Latimer represents the city.

== Education ==
Yonkers Public Schools operates the city's public schools. There are several elementary Catholic schools, one Muslim school, Sacred Heart High School, a catholic high school operated by the Archdiocese of New York, and the Academy for Jewish Religion, a rabbinical and cantorial school.

Sarah Lawrence College, with a Bronxville mailing address, is located in Yonkers. Westchester Community College (part of the State University of New York system) operates a number of extension centers in Yonkers, with the largest in the Cross County Shopping Center. Saint Vladimir's Orthodox Theological Seminary is in Crestwood. The Japanese School of New York was in Yonkers for one year; the school moved to Queens on August 18, 1991, and to Greenwich, Connecticut on September 1, 1992.

Three library branches are operated by the Yonkers Public Library: Crestwood, Riverfront, and Grinton I. Will. The Carnegie Library, funded by Andrew Carnegie, was demolished in May 1982 to make way for the expansion of Nepperhan Avenue as an arterial road.

== Transportation ==
=== Mass transit ===
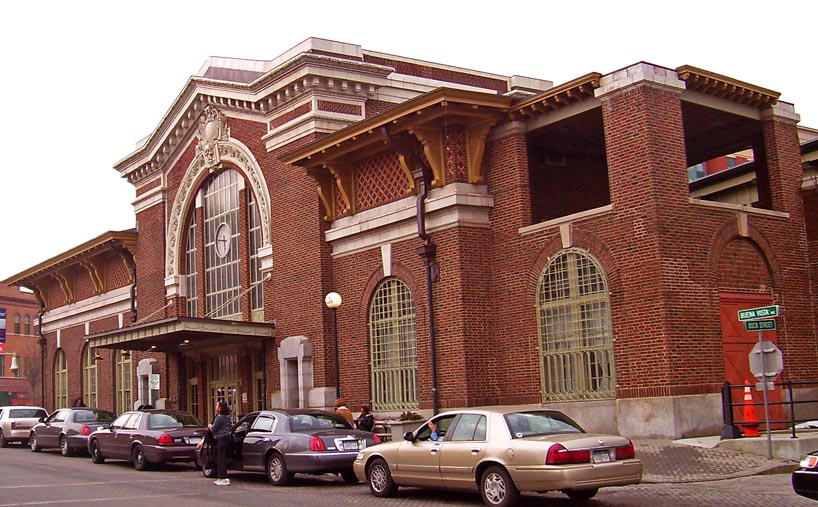
The city's Metro-North train station

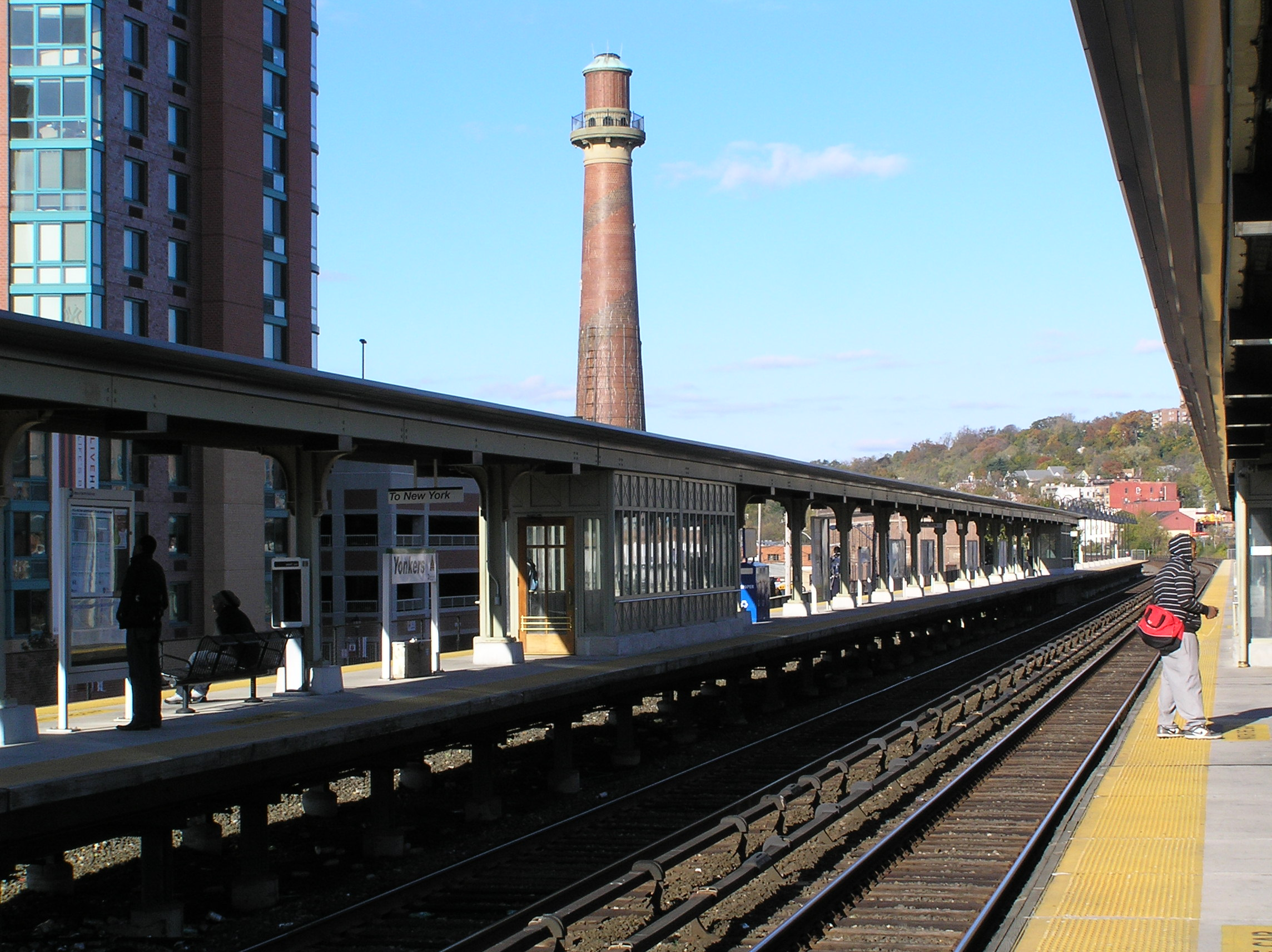
Yonkers Metro-North platform

Yonkers has the eleventh-highest rate of public-transit ridership among cities in the United States, and 27 percent of the city's households do not own a car. Bus service is provided by the Westchester County Bee-Line Bus System (the state's second-largest bus system), and the MTA Bus Company has express routes to Manhattan. Yonkers is the top terminus of the Bee-Line Bus service area, which includes Westchester and the northern Bronx, and the Getty Square intermodal hub serves millions of passengers per year.

The Metro-North Railroad serves Yonkers with two heavy-rail commuter lines: the Hudson Line and the Harlem Line. The Ludlow, Yonkers, Glenwood, and Greystone stations are on the Hudson Line, which provides commuter service to New York City. The Yonkers station is also served by all of Amtrak's named Empire Service trains except for the Lake Shore Limited. Several Harlem Line stations are on or near the city's eastern border. These include Wakefield, Mount Vernon West, Fleetwood, Bronxville, Tuckahoe and Crestwood.

The area was served by the commuter New York and Putnam Railroad from the late 19th century until its closure in 1958. Its right-of-way has been paved and is used as a public park and part of the Empire State Trail, which spans 750 miles (1,210 km) from New York City to Buffalo and Rouses Point via Albany. Until December 2009, New York Water Taxi operated a ferry service from downtown Yonkers to Manhattan's Financial District. From 2018 to 2020, Yonkers had a dockless bikeshare program operated by LimeBike. It has an electric-scooter program which was begun in August 2020 by Bird, making Yonkers the first city in New York with such a program.

=== Roads and paths ===
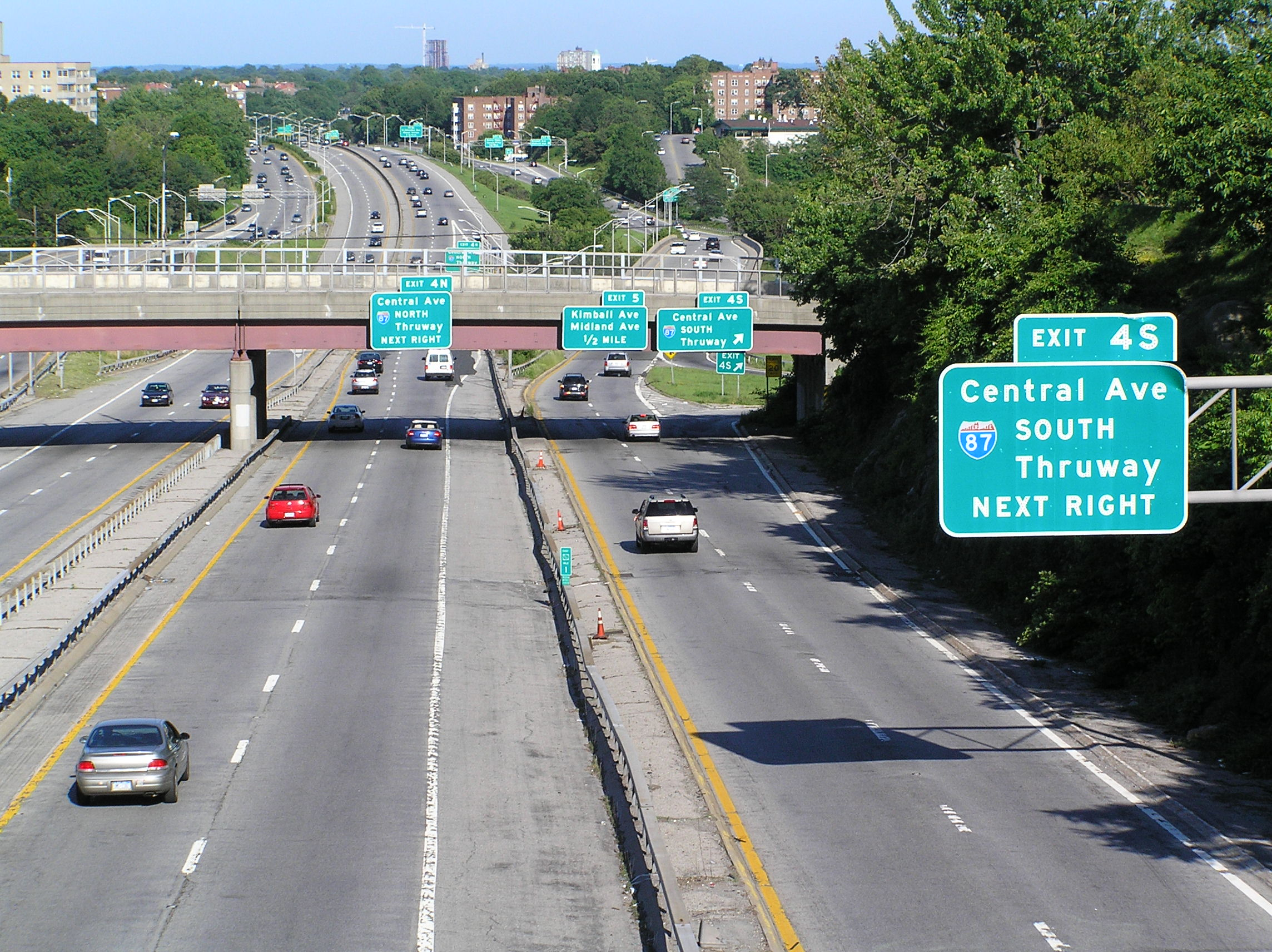
Eastbound Cross County Parkway

Limited-access highways in Yonkers include Interstate 87 (the New York State Thruway) and the Saw Mill, Bronx River, Sprain Brook and Cross County Parkways. US 9, NY 9A, and NY 100 are major surface streets.

The main line of the former New York and Putnam Railroad has been converted into the South County Trailway, a paved walking and bicycling path. It runs north–south in Yonkers from the Hastings-on-Hudson border in the north to the Bronx border in the south at Van Cortlandt Park, where it is known as the Putnam Greenway. The Croton Aqueduct tunnel has a hard-packed dirt trail, the Old Croton Aqueduct Trailway, running above it for most of its length in Yonkers; a few on-street routes are on the edge of the Getty Square neighborhood.

== Fire department ==
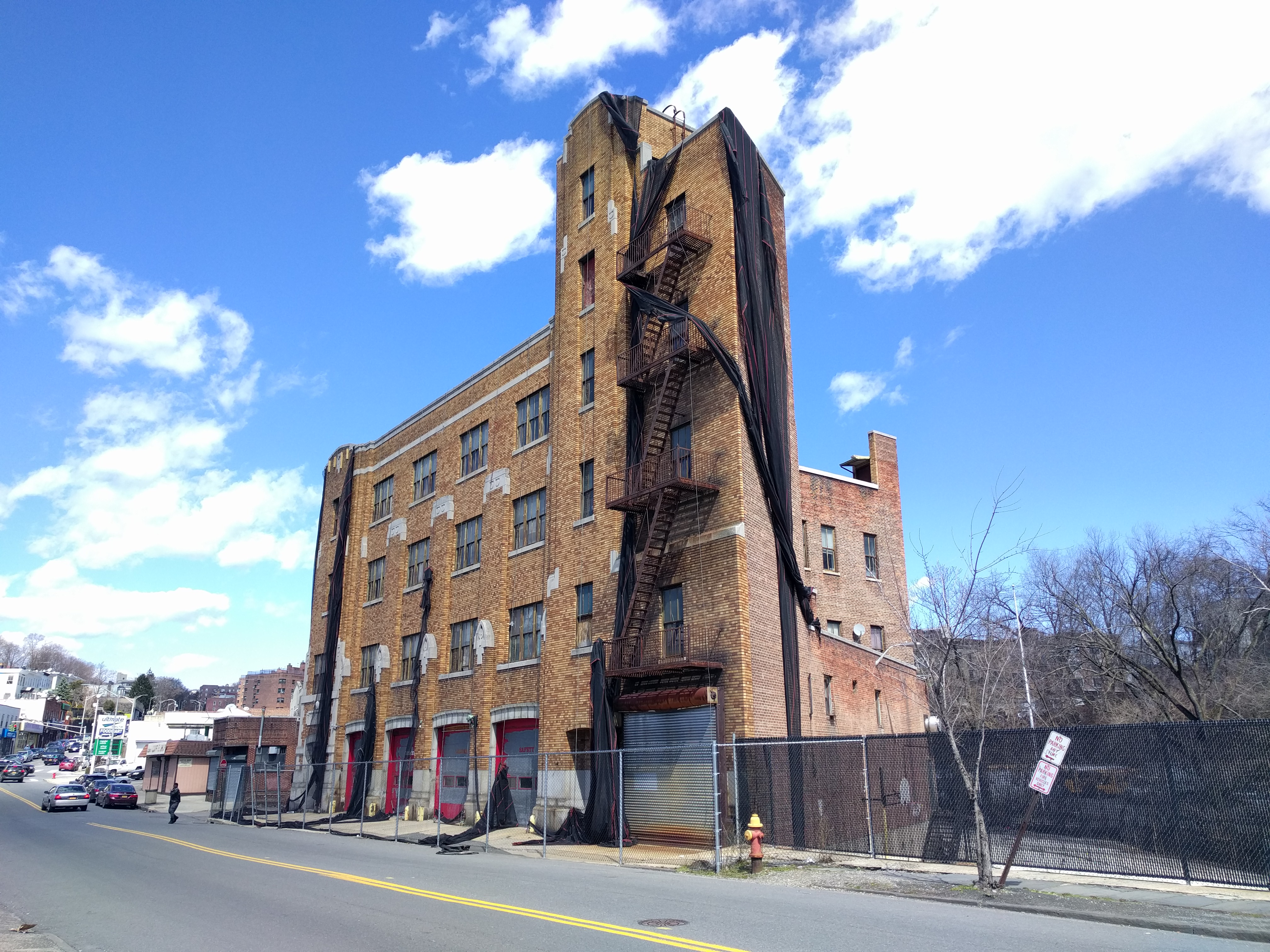
The Yonkers Fire Department headquarters from 1927 to 2015

The city is served by the Yonkers Fire Department (YFD), which has 459 firefighters under the command of a fire commissioner and three deputy chiefs. Founded in 1896, the YFD operates from 14 fire stations throughout the city in two battalions commanded by two assistant chiefs for each shift. The department responds to about 16,000 emergency calls annually. In its fire apparatus fleet, the YFD has 10 engine companies, six ladder companies, one squad (rescue-pumper) company, one rescue company, one fireboat, one air cascade unit, one USAR (urban search and rescue) collapse unit, one foam unit, one hazmat unit, and several special, support, and reserve units.

== Economy ==
Yonkers is home to several brewing companies, most notably the Simple Motive Brewing Company and Yonkers Brewing Company. The Yonkers Brewing Company opened in 2015 in the Yonkers Trolley Barn, a former trolley station which is listed on the National Register of Historic Places. Before its opening, brewing in the city had been associated with former mobster Dutch Schultz. The Simple Motive Brewing Company opened in the Carpet Mills Art District at the Mills, a 55,000-square-foot (5,100 m^{2}) former warehouse, in 2023 after years of delays.

The city had an unemployment rate of 18.7 percent during the COVID-19 pandemic, with about 17,800 people out of work. The unemployment rate increased to 19.4 percent in July 2020, the highest in Yonkers history. Unemployment was 2.8 percent in April 2023, the lowest in city history.

Yonkers is one of only two cities in New York State that levy their own municipal income tax, the other being New York City. Nonresidents who earn wages or carry on a trade or business in the city owe an earnings tax of 0.5% on those wages and on net earnings from self-employment, filed on Form Y-203, while residents owe an income tax surcharge; both are administered by the New York State Department of Taxation and Finance.

Yonkers was where Otis Elevator Company was founded in 1867 along with a plant that operated until 1981 and site became Kawasaki Railcar Manufacturing car plant.

=== Principal employers ===
According to Yonkers's 2024 Comprehensive Annual Financial Report, its principal employers were:

1. St. John's Riverside Hospital – 1,939
2. St. Joseph's Medical Center – 1,027
3. Rising – 999
4. Liberty Lines – 749
5. Kawasaki Rail – 489
6. Consumer Reports – 479
7. American Sugar Refining – 327
8. Macy's – 316
9. Lionsgate - 264
10. Cintas – 238
11. Stew Leonard's - 210

== Sister cities ==
Yonkers is twinned with:

- Ternopil, Ukraine (1991)
- Kamëz, Albania (2011)
