= Colen Donck =

Coordinates: 40.880007°N 73.916615°W

Colen Donck (in English "Donck's Colony") was a 24,000-acre (97 km^{2}) patroonship in New Netherland along the southern Hudson River in today's Bronx and Yonkers established by Dutch-American lawyer and land developer Adriaen van der Donck.

== History ==
The land was granted van der Donck by controversial Director General of New Netherlands Willem Kieft in 1646 in return for van der Donck's role as an interpreter and peacemaker in conflicts between Dutch colonists and Native Americans. The West India Company had purchased the land (then called "Kiskiskeck") from its Native American holders in 1639.

Van der Donck's parcel began on the mainland directly to the north of the island (Manhattan), continued along the river for twelve miles, and carried eastward as far as the Bronx River, becoming much of what is today the Bronx and southwestern Westchester County.

He named his estate Colen Donck (or "Colendonck"; spellings vary, the latter being more consistent with Dutch construction) and built his house between current-day Van Cortlandt Lake and Broadway. He also built a saw mill on the Neperan River where it flows into the Hudson. He then built a grist mill to process the corn grown on what had been the old Indian corn grounds. Van der Donck paid the Indian chief Tacharew, whose tribe used to live on the land, as a gesture of friendship. This area later became part of Van Cortlandt Park. The estate was so large that locals referred to him as the Jonkheer ("young gentleman" or "squire"), the source of today's name "Yonkers". His political activities and trip to Holland, precluded his giving the patroonship the attention it needed.

Records show Van der Donck to have been alive in August 1655. He is described as having died on Manhattan island in 1655 by Who's Who in America. Records of the following January indicate there was a dispute between his relations over two bibles taken by Indians in the sacking of his home in the raids known as the Peach War, leaving the cause of his death unknown.

His widow remarried and moved to Maryland. Obtaining confirmation of title from Governor Richard Nicolls, she sold the land to her brother, Elias Doughty, who then began to sell off parcels. A portion later became part of the Manor of Fordham. Northern section became the Manor of Philipsburg.
