= Park Hill, Yonkers =

Neighborhood in Yonkers, New York, US

Coordinates: 40.91723°N 73.89062°W

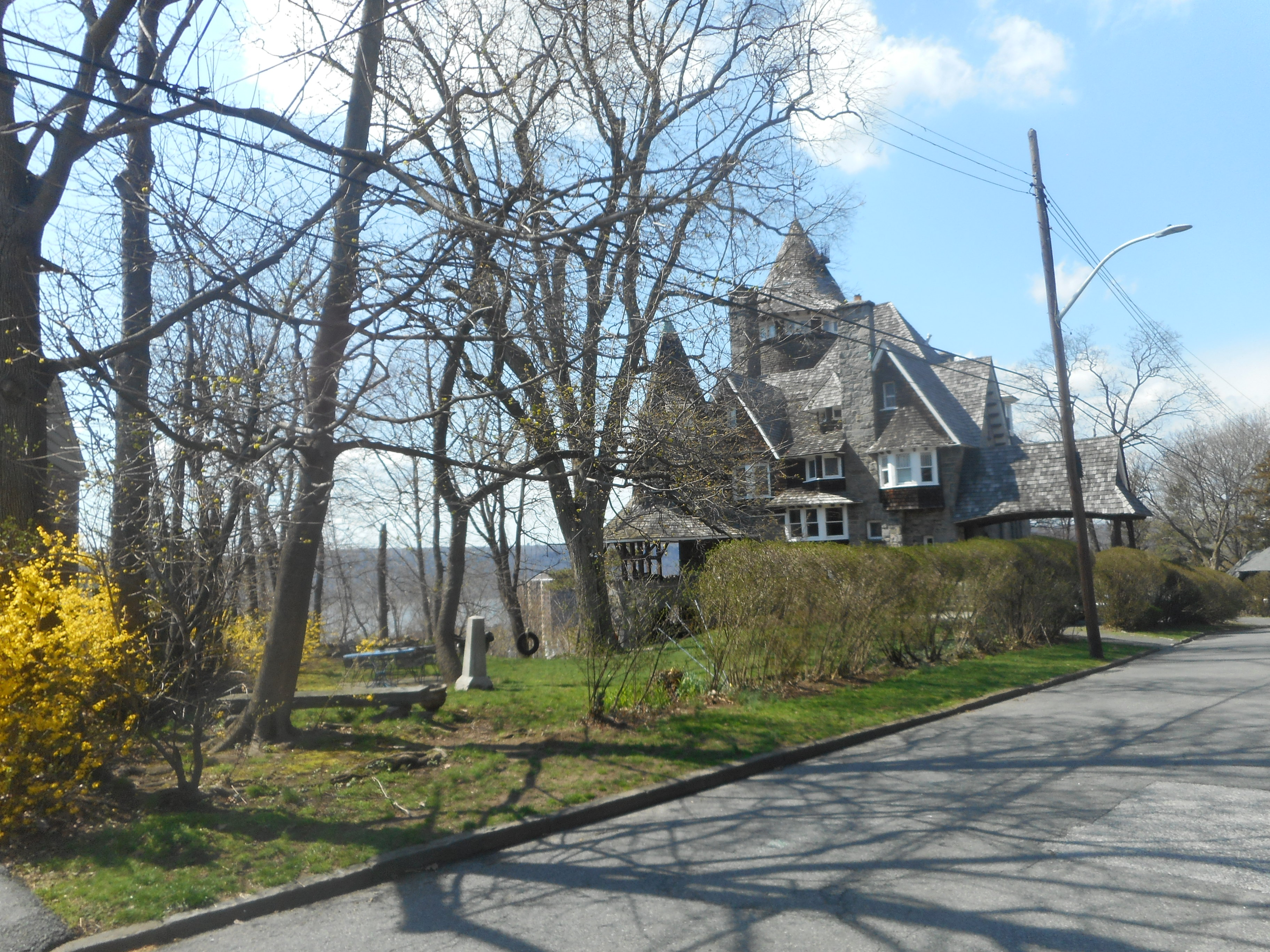
The E.K. Martin House, one of the many Victorian mansions overlooking the Hudson River from Park Hill.

Park Hill is a neighborhood in southwestern Yonkers, New York. The neighborhood is located atop a bluff east of South Broadway.

The neighborhood was developed in 1888 by the American Real Estate Company of Manhattan as one of the first planned communities in the New York metropolitan area. The neighborhood's centerpiece for a short time was the Hendric Hudson Hotel, designed by Bruce Price, the architect of the Château Frontenac in Quebec City. Park Hill contains many vintage single-family homes, many overlooking the Hudson River. The neighborhood's housing stock consists primarily of large Victorian, Tudor Revival, Arts & Crafts, and Georgian Colonial-style homes.

Notable residents in the past include the actor Richard Bennett and his daughters, Joan and Constance as well as Dennis O'Brien, the United Artists counsel.

Park Hill was once the home of a funicular railroad, the Park Hill Incline, which ran from the Getty Square Branch of the New York and Putnam Railroad to Alta Avenue between 1894 and 1937. The two stations that served the Incline are now private residences.
