= St. John's Riverside Hospital =

Hospital in Yonkers, New York

St. John’s Riverside Hospital

Geography
- Location: 967 N. Broadway, Yonkers, New York, United States
- Coordinates: 40°58′7″N 73°53′10″W

Organization
- Funding: Non-profit hospital
- Type: General

Services
- Beds: 407

History
- Opened: 1869

Links
- Website: www.riversidehealth.org
- Lists: Hospitals in New York State

St. John's Riverside Hospital is a private, community hospital located in Yonkers, New York. It was founded in 1869 as the first hospital in Westchester County, and shares a location and history with the Cochran School of Nursing, which was founded in 1894 as the first nursing school in Westchester. The hospital was two primary locations in Yonkers, which is the result of its merger with Yonkers General Hospital in 2001.

== History ==
St. John's Invalid Home was founded in 1869 by a group of women from St. John's Episcopal Church in Yonkers to tend to the poor of their parish. As the first hospital in Westchester County, it was incorporated as a non-profit institution in the early 1870s. First located at Warburton and Ashburton Avenues, the hospital moved to Woodworth Avenue and Locust Street in 1870, before relocating again to buildings on Ashburton Avenue donated by William and Eva Cochran in 1894. That year, the Cochran School of Nursing was established at the hospital as the first nursing school in Westchester County and one of the first in the United States. The school is affiliated with Mercy College and SUNY Delhi.

The hospital constructed its current Andrus Pavilion on North Broadway in 1959, which rises 14 stories and accommodates 273 beds. In 1999, the hospital constructed a nursing home. It acquired a second location, the ParkCare Pavilion, after merging with Yonkers General Hospital in 2001, which today is an outpatient center. The additional Michael N. Malotz Skilled Nursing Pavilion was opened that year, which houses 120 beds. Today, the hospital contains a total of 407 beds, maintains a staff of 300 physicians, and is accredited by the New York State Department of Health and the Joint Commission.

In 2002, the 50-bed Community Hospital of Dobbs Ferry was purchased. Now the Dobbs Ferry Pavilion of St. John's Riverside Hospital.
