= Winchester Villages =

Coordinates: 40°58′9.5″N 73°50′56″W

Winchester Villages is a gated community in the northeastern segment of the city of Yonkers in Westchester County, New York. It was built by the Ginsburg Development Company and completed in 1997. It consists of 188 semi-attached homes. The homes originally sold for under $300,000, making them among the most affordable options in Westchester County at the time.

The complex includes a playground, tennis courts, a swimming pool, and a clubhouse with a small gym and party facilities. The development has drawn criticism for its car-dependent design, as its only entrance is located on East Grassy Sprain Road, a not pedestrian-friendly road parallel to the northbound lanes of the Sprain Brook Parkway. The closest bus stop is nearly two miles away.
