= Yonkers Fire Department =

Fire department of Yonkers, New York, U.S.

Yonkers Fire Department (YFD)
Operational area
- Country: United States
- State: New York
- City: Yonkers

Agency overview
- Established: 1896
- Annual calls: ~20,000
- Employees: 459
- Staffing: Career
- Commissioner: William Fitzpatrick
- EMS level: BLS First Responder
- IAFF: 628

Facilities and equipment
- Battalions: 2 Battalions
- Stations: 12 Firehouses
- Engines: 10 Engine Companies
- Trucks: 6 Truck Companies
- Squads: 2 Squad Companies (Rescue Pumper)
- Rescues: 1 Heavy Rescue Company
- Tenders: 1 Water Tender Unit
- HAZMAT: 1 Hazardous Materials Unit
- USAR: 1 Urban Search And Rescue Unit
- Fireboats: 1 Fireboat

Website
- www.yonkersfire.org

The Yonkers Fire Department (YFD) provides fire protection and emergency medical services to the city of Yonkers, New York, United States.

The department currently responds to approximately 15,000 emergency calls annually. The current Chief of Department/Fire Commissioner is William Fitzpatrick.

== History ==
Firefighting in Yonkers originated in 1852 when the first fire company, Protection Engine Co. 1, was formed there. The following year, in 1853, the Hope Hook & Ladder Co. 1 was formed, as well as the Lady Washington Engine Co. 2. In 1855, all fire companies in Yonkers were privately owned and not under the jurisdiction of village authorities. The village appropriated funds to purchase the fire apparatus from the private citizens who owned the fire companies. From 1868 until the late 1890s, fourteen additional fire companies were formed including The City of Yonkers Fire Department (YFD), established in 1896. By 1888, the volunteer fire companies in Yonkers had grown to 386 firemen. In 1895, fire commissioners were authorized by the Yonkers Common Council after the city charter was revised.

On August 6, 1896, the Fire Commissioner's Board appointed six paid firemen to the Palisade Avenue Firehouse. Three paid firemen were appointed to the Hope Hook & Ladder Co. 1, and three men were appointed to the Lady Washington Engine Co. 2, both quartered in the same firehouse. The appointments marked the first paid firemen in the Yonkers Fire Department. In October 1897, five paid firemen were added to the firehouse on Vineyard Avenue (Station 2).

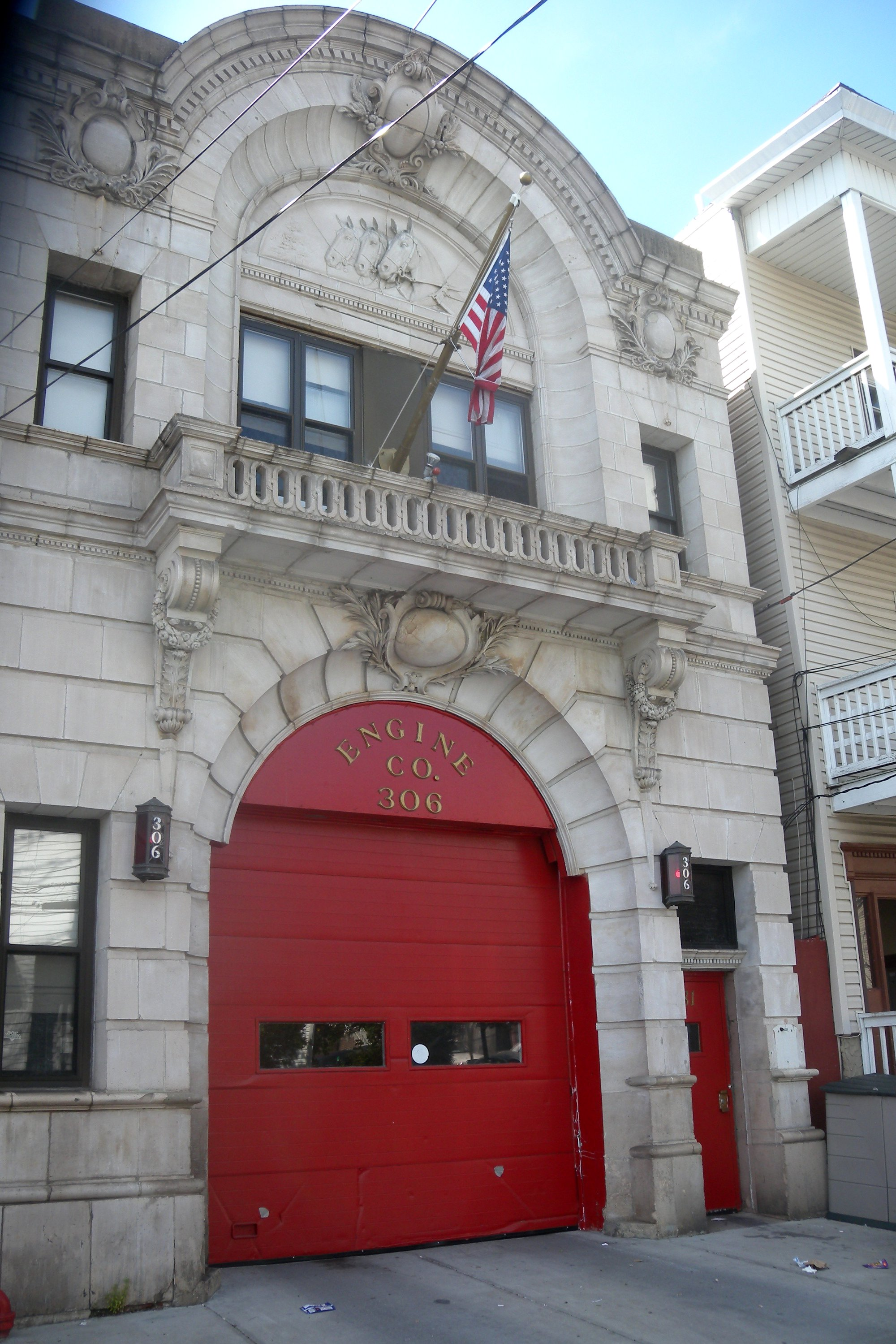
YFD Station 6, established in 1902, is the quarters of Engine 306 and is located on Oak Street.

By the end of 1913, eight pieces of fire apparatus were motorized. In 1914, Truck Co. 4 was placed into service at the Station 4 Radford Street Firehouse. By 1916, the entire Yonkers Fire Department was motorized, and the department had over 126 firemen.

On March 13, 1961, Truck Co. 5 was moved from Station/Engine 7, to Station/Engine 12, on Fortfield Avenue. On September 1, 1961, the department acquired its own radio system. Also in 1961, YFD took delivery of a Mack B/Gerstenslager Walk-In Heavy Duty Rescue Apparatus running as Rescue Company 1 out of Fire Headquarters-Station 1. Two 1961 Ward LaFrance Fire Brands Pumpers were purchased (One assigned to Engine Co.2 and Engine Co. 8). In 1963, Yonkers Fire Department purchased one Ward LaFrance MarkII/Ambassador Pumper, which originally started at Engine Co. 1, before moving over to Engine Co. 2 in 1967 and then in 1971 as Engine Co. 3, before being destroyed in an accident. After the accident, the roof of the Ward LaFrance MarkII/Ambassador was cut and placed on top of the Ward LaFrance Fire Brand assigned to Engine Co. 7. In March 1967, the Yonkers Fire Department took delivery of a New Mack C Pumper that was assigned to Engine Co. 1 at Station 1/Fire Headquarters. Later in 1967, the Yonkers Fire Department took delivery of an American LaFrance 900 Series 100 ft Mid Mount Aerial Truck, that was assigned to Truck Co. 1 at Station 1/Fire Headquarters. On December 21, 1967, Truck Co. 7 was organized and placed into service at Station/Engine 14. In 1968, Yonkers FD took delivery of an additional Mack C Pumper, which was assigned to Engine Co. 4 on Radford Street. On July 31, 1970, the YFD acquired the Bureau of Combustibles. In 1971, the YFD turned 75 and consisted of 13 Engine Companies, 7 Truck Companies, 1 Rescue Company, and a force of 405 uniformed firemen.

In 1980, a new Station 8, located at 571 Warburton Avenue, was opened. It replaced the old carriage house Station 8, located at 607 Warburton Avenue. On July 17, 1980, all Fire Alarm Boxes were removed from street corners, as the city deemed it too costly to repair the system. On August 18, 1980, Ladder Co. 76 was moved from Station 11 to Station 3 on 96 Vark Street. On September 15, 1980, Station 2 (quarters of Engine Co. 302 and Engine Co. 305) on Vineyard Avenue was permanently closed due to structural issues. Because of this, Engine Co. 302 was relocated to Station 9 and Engine Co. 305 was relocated to Station 1-Fire Headquarters on New School Street. In December 1980, the title of Chief of Department was replaced with the position of "Fire Commissioner".

On April 16, 1981, Yonkers Fire Department Union local 628 employees (approximately 410 firefighters and officers) walked off the job due to a contract dispute. The strike lasted two days.

In 1996, the Yonkers Fire Department celebrated its 100 Anniversary. The designations of the Assistant Chiefs of the East and West Divisions, formerly known as Division Chief 1 and Division Chief 2, were changed to Battalion Chief's 1 and 2, with the East and West Division becoming Battalion's 1 and 2. Additionally, civilian employees were hired to replace firefighters in the Dispatch Office. Also, the Fire Department Repair Shop, formerly located at Station 7, the quarters of Engine Co. 307, was moved to the Department of Public Works (DPW) Repair Shop located at 1130 Nepperhan Avenue.

== Organization ==
As of 2018, the City of Yonkers Fire Department is subdivided into three main divisions: Operations, Personnel, and Fire Prevention. Each division is commanded by a deputy chief.

=== Operations Division ===
The Operations Division provides firefighting and emergency medical services. It consists of two firefighting battalions, the Marine Unit (Fire Boat), Fire Repair Shop, Fire Communications, and the Special Operations Command.

The current Deputy Chief of Operations is Ray Mahoskey.

The Fire and Emergency Response services staff consists of a deputy chief, 13 battalion chiefs, 31 captains, 75 lieutenants, 314 firefighters, and one civilian employee. The Fire Communications Office's staff consists of a lieutenant and one firefighter.

=== Personnel Division ===
The Deputy Chief of Personnel is responsible for Personnel, Training, Labor/Management Relations, Planning and Development and Manpower. The current Deputy Chief of Personnel is Joseph Citrone.

Currently in the Personnel Division, there are four subdivisions, each with its own staff. The Administrative Office's staff consists of a fire commissioner/chief of department, a deputy chief, a captain, and seven civilian employees.

=== Fire Prevention Division ===
The Deputy Chief of Fire Prevention is responsible for managing the Fire Prevention Division, the Fire Investigation Unit and Fire Safety Education. This includes overseeing the inspection of existing buildings and those under construction or renovation, processing all complaints or inquires and enforcement of New York State Fire and Building Codes, investigation of the cause and origin of all fires of consequence, and fire safety education programs for the citizens of the city. The current Deputy Chief of Fire Prevention is Christopher DeSantis.

The Fire Prevention, Education, and Safety Education Unit staff consists of a deputy chief, a captain, two lieutenants, seven firefighters, and a civilian employee.

== Operations ==
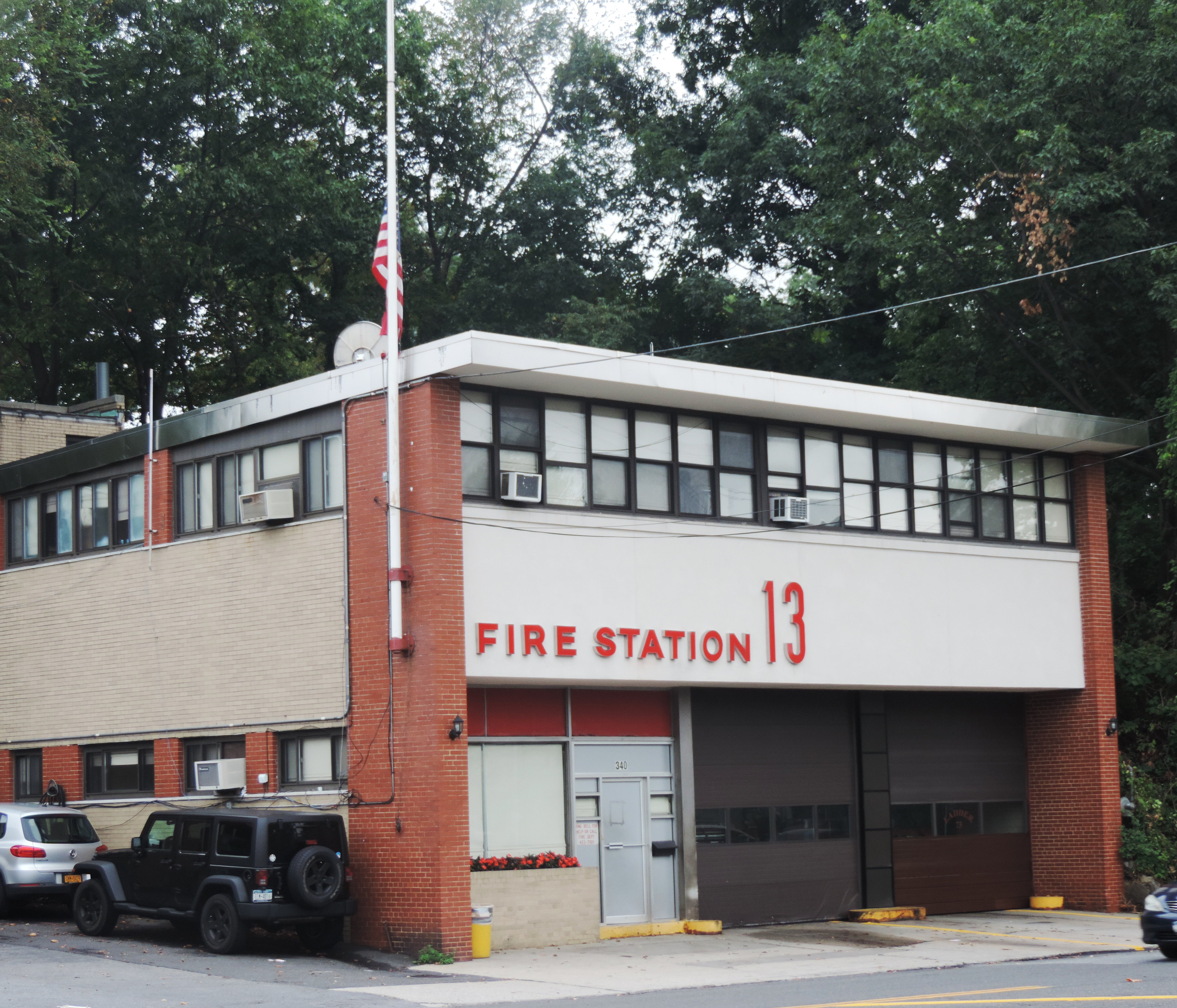
YFD Station 13, the quarters of Engine 313, Ladder 73, and The Foam Unit, located on Kimball Ave.

The Yonkers Fire Department currently operates out of 12 firehouses, located throughout the city, in two battalions, under the command of a Deputy Chief of Operations. Each battalion is commanded by an Assistant Chief on each shift. The Yonkers Fire Department operates ten engine companies, six ladder companies, one rescue company, one squad company (rescue pumper), and numerous Special, Support, and Reserve Units. Each front line piece of fire apparatus is staffed by a crew of three firefighters and one fire officer for each shift.

In addition to the front line fire apparatus, the YFD operates a number of special and support units, as well as historical units and reserve units, most of which are located at the Special Operations and Storage Facility. Also, the YFD operates an extensive fleet of Spare and Reserve fire apparatus. All spare fire apparatus are unequipped and are put into service when front line fire apparatus are taken out of service for maintenance. All reserve apparatus are readily equipped to be placed into service as callback units, staffed by off-duty callback personnel when needed.

In addition to the twelve firehouses, the YFD also operates a repair shop.

=== Current Stations and Apparatus ===
Below is a complete listing of all YFD fire station locations and fire companies, by battalion, in the city of Yonkers. Each piece of front line apparatus is staffed with a minimum of four firefighters, including a driver and an officer.

Fire Station Number	Engine Company	Ladder Company	Specialized Unit/Spare or Reserve Unit/Supplemental Unit/Historical Unit	Battalion or Car vehicle	Battalion	Address	Neighborhood	Build Date
Station 1		Tower Ladder 71	Rescue 1, Squad 21, Rescue 2 (Spare)		1	7 New School Street (FF Patrick Joyce Way)	Chicken Island	Companies Moved in on April 6, 2020
Station 3	Engine 303			Battalion 1	1	96 Vark St.	Getty Square	Built 1971
Station 4	Engine 304	Ladder 74			1	36 Radford St.	Ludlow	Built 1916
Station 6	Engine 306				1	81 Oak St.	Nodine Hill	Built 1902/Rebuilt 1962
Station 7	Engine 307		Spare Ladder 76		2	441 Central Park Ave.	Lincoln Park	Built 1931
Station 8	Engine 308		Spare Ladder 78, Fireboat 1, Historical Engine 298		1	571 Warburton Ave.	Northwest Yonkers	Built 1980
Station 9	Engine 309	Ladder 72			1	53 Shonnard Pl.	Northwest Yonkers	Built 1932
Station 10	Engine 310				2	573 Saw Mill River Rd.	Nepperhan	Built 1909
Station 11			Squad 11 (rescue pumper), USAR Collapse Unit		2	433 Bronxville Rd.	Cedar Knolls	Built 1921
Station 12	Engine 312	Tower Ladder 75	LDH (Large Diameter Hose) Engine 300	Battalion 2	2	75 Fortfield Ave.	Bryn Mawr	Built 1930
Station 13	Engine 313	Ladder 73	Foam Unit		2	340 Kimball Ave.	Southeast Yonkers	Built 1956
Station 14	Engine 314	Ladder 70	Spare Engine 316		2	2187 Central Park Ave.	Northeast Yonkers	Built 1958
YFD Headquarters/ YFD Special Operations Division			Haz-Mat. Unit, Car 6 (Fire Investigation/Arson Unit), Spare/Reserve Engines (315, 317, 318, 319) Spare Reserve Ladders (77, 78, 79), Mask Service (air cascade) Unit 1, Spare Reserve Tower Ladders (80, 81), Spare Squad (Old Squad 11), Historical Truck Company 5,	Car 1 (Commissioner), Car 2 (Chief), Car 3 (Deputy Chief), Car 4 (Deputy Chief)	1	YFD Headquarters - 470 Nepperhan Ave/YFD Special Operations - 460 Nepperhan Ave. Also located in the lot behind the Salt Shed located behind Murray's Skating Rink off of Tuckahoe Road, and the YFD Special Operations Lot on Ashburton Avenue	Nepperhan Valley	Remodeled 2001

== See also ==
- List of New York fire departments
