= Sherwood House (Yonkers, New York) =

Historic house in New York, United States

- U.S. National Register of Historic Places
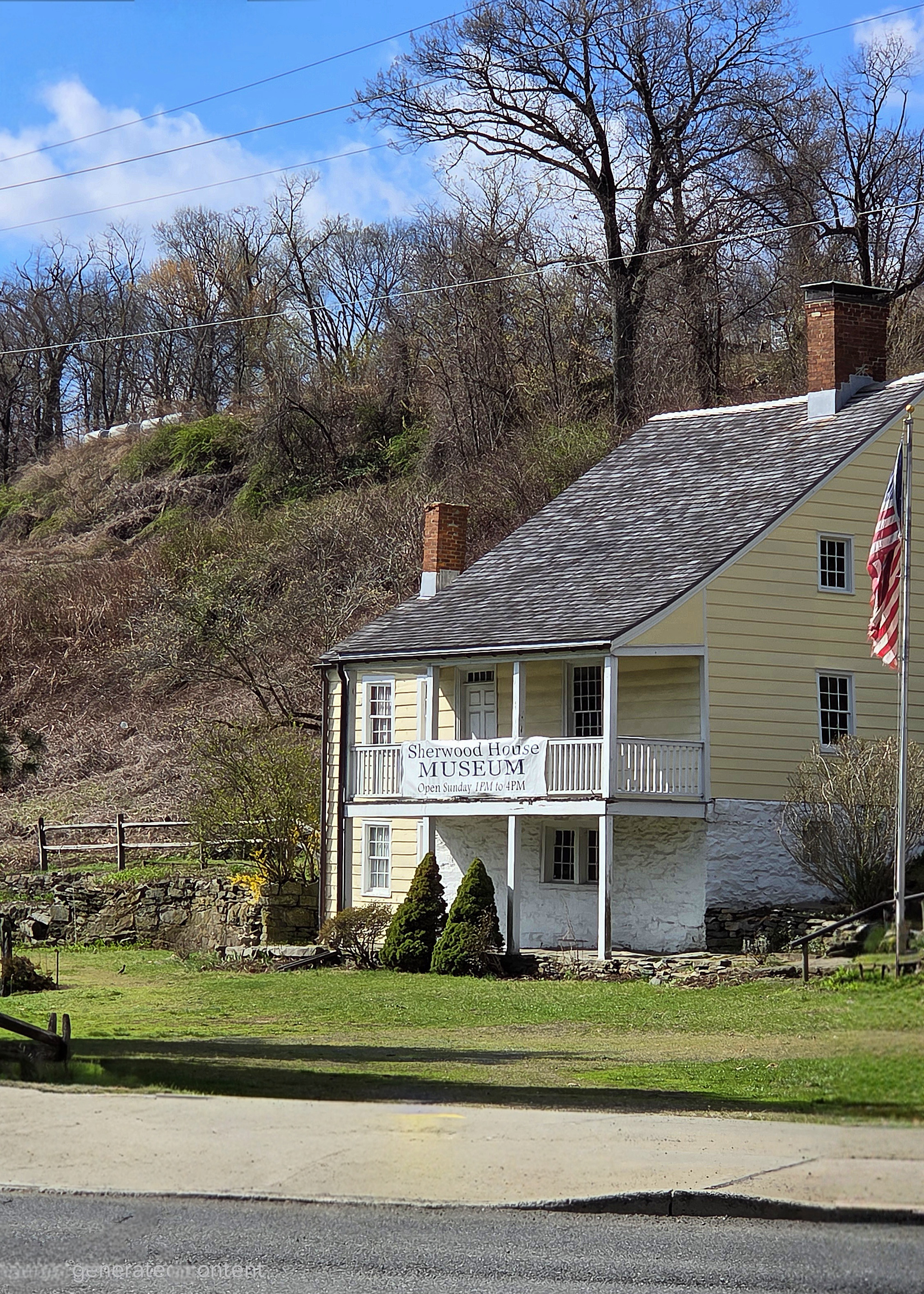

- Location within New York Location within the United States
- Interactive map showing the location of Sherwood House
- Location: 340 Tuckahoe Rd., Yonkers, New York
- Coordinates: 40°57′7″N 73°51′19″W
- Area: 2.2 acres (0.89 ha)
- Built: 1740
- NRHP reference No.: 84003434
- Added to NRHP: May 10, 1984

Sherwood House is a historic home located at Yonkers, Westchester County, New York. The house sits on a 2.2-acre plot and is known as one of the few remaining pre-Revolutionary War tenant farmhouses in the New York metropolitan area. Its simple, practical design is probably of Dutch origin. Also on the property is a 1 1/2-story frame caretaker's cottage and a barn. Both were built about 1840.

The house was built in 1740 near an old Native American trail by Thomas Sherwood, who leased a 25-acre farm on Philipsburg Manor. It is a three-story frame structure on an exposed basement built into a hillside. It features a two-story porch spanning the entire facade and two Dutch doors.

In 1776, General George Washington widened the trail adjacent to Sherwood House to accommodate the passage of the Continental Army. It is likely that Thomas, who supported the revolutionary cause, assisted with the process, especially as it went right past the house, and the wider road would be beneficial to the farm. Washington personally inspected the road, passing by the Sherwood Farm. (This trail would eventually become the present-day Tuckahoe Road between the city of Yonkers and the village of Tuckahoe.)

In 1779, Frederick Philipse III, the last lord of Philipsburg Manor and a staunch Loyalist, was attainted for treason by New York's revolutionary government. Philipsburg Manor was confiscated, split into about 300 lots, and then sold at public auction. Most of the buyers were Philipse’s tenant farmers who used the opportunity to buy the small plots they worked. One of them was Thomas's son, Stephen, who purchased the Sherwood farm and house from the New York Commissioners of Forfeiture.

Additions and modifications were made in the 1810s, 1850s, and 1880s by later owners, one of whom, Dr. John I. Ingersoll, the first medical doctor in Yonkers, used it as his office. Afterwards, it became a Prohibition-era speakeasy and, still later, a popular restaurant. In 1955, the property was acquired by Consolidated Edison as part of a right-of-way for building power lines. When the company proposed to tear it down, public outcry led to an agreement to move the lines and lease the house to the newly formed Yonkers Historical Society. It is now owned by the society, which has operated it as a museum since 1962.

The house was added to the National Register of Historic Places in 1984.
