= Yonkers Greenway =

The Yonkers Greenway is a 3.1-mile (5.0 km) multi-use linear park and rail trail under development in Yonkers, New York. The $14 million public-private partnership project is transforming the abandoned branch of the New York and Putnam Railroad into a walking, running, and bicycling corridor that combats historic redlining and urban heat islands by reintroducing accessible green spaces, public art, and neighborhood infrastructure. The project connects the downtown Yonkers rail station directly with Van Cortlandt Park in the Bronx. Construction is planned to be completed in 2026. The abandoned railroad line had been discovered by neighborhood activists in 2012.

== See also ==
- The 606
- The High Line
