= Grinton I. Will =

American librarian

Grinton I. Will in 1961.

Grinton Ingham Will (April 15, 1903 – June 6, 1986) was an American library director of the Yonkers Public Library.

== Early life and education ==
Grinton was the son of Edwin Robertson and M. Helen (Ingham) Will. Will's grandfather John H. Will immigrated to the United States from Bonn, Germany in 1848. His father, Edwin Will, studied architecture at the City College of New York and Cooper Union before working at an architectural firm. His mother, M. Helen Ingham, studied at Hunter College and then became a teacher in New York City. Will's brother Robert was born in 1909.

Will grew up in Mamaroneck and attended the Rye Neck public schools. He then attended Wesleyan University where he received a Bachelor of Arts degree. He became a librarian at the Mamaroneck Public Library in 1922. He worked at the Mamaroneck Public Library for ten years and became its library director. In 1930, Will became a language instructor and librarian at the Connecticut Agricultural College. During that same year, he earned a certificate of library science from the Columbia University School of Library Service. He additionally taught public library administration at the Pratt Institute Library School. On November 15, 1933, he was hired to work as the library director of the Yonkers Public Library.

== Yonkers Public Library ==
Under Will's direction, three branches of the Yonkers Public Library were built. These were the Coyne Park Branch, the Hudson Museum River Branch, and the Grassy Sprain Branch, which would later become known as the Grinton I. Will Library. Though already built, the Crestwood Library Branch building was enlarged. Bookmobiles were inaugurated by Will to provide library service to Yonkers residents who were not close to a library branch. With this service, Mr. Will hoped to provide library service to every part of Yonkers. This helped increase the circulation of materials. On December 19, 1961, a celebration was held for the one millionth book circulated. According to Grinton I. Will, by the time of his retirement in 1973, the Yonkers Public Library was the highest circulating library of its group (cities with a population between 100,000 and 250,000 people). Grinton was contacted by United States State Department about the possibility of using bookmobiles in Asia after World War Two. Though discussed, the plan was never implemented. Various programs were held at the Yonkers Public Library while Will was the director. These included a mock radio broadcast with Stan Z. Burns from 1010 WINS, a concert with National Symphony musicians Daniel Domb and Sidney Moore, a production of The Wizard of Oz, and doll story times. Grinton I. Will retired from the Yonkers Public Library on May 1, 1973, at the age of 70.

== Professional Affiliations ==
Besides working as a library director, Grinton I. Will served as a deputy director of the Westchester Library System, a board member for the New York Library Association, and became the director of the American Library Association in 1955. He was given an honorary life membership to the Mamaroneck Public Library.

== Community work ==
Grinton I. Will belonged to the Westchester County History Society, the New York State Historical Society, and was vice-president of the Yonkers Historical Society. He was involved with various Yonkers community organizations, such as the Boy Scouts of America troop in Yonkers. Additionally, Will was the president of the Yonkers Rotary Club, deputy director of Civil Defense in Yonkers, member of the Red Cross in Yonkers, and member of the Yonkers Chamber of Commerce.

== Music interest ==
Will was a guest conductor for both the Larchmont and Mamaroneck choral societies. He wrote original lyrics and music for choral compositions. These include "Through the Night a Starry Way" and "Lord, O Lord, Look Down Upon Us." These songs were published by H.W. Gray Publications in 1928. He was an organist and choir director of churches in Yonkers, including the Bryn Mawr Park Presbyterian Church and the Calvary Baptist Church. As a pianist, he published several pieces including Christmas carols.

== Marriage ==
Grinton married Clarissa Lord on March 14, 1931, at St. Bartholomew's Church in Manhattan. Clarissa attended Connecticut College for Women and received a Bachelor of Arts degree. After graduating, she worked as a statistician in the economics department at the University of Connecticut before getting married. Grinton and Clarissa had two sons together-Brian Robert and David Grinton Will.

== Legacy ==
The Grassy Sprain Library's name was changed to the Grinton I. Will Library upon Will's retirement in 1973. Will died on June 6, 1986, at the age of 83.
