= James Renwick Jr. =

American architect (1818–1895)

- Born: November 11, 1818; New York City, U.S.
- Died: June 23, 1895 (aged 76); New York City, U.S.
- Resting place: Green-Wood Cemetery, Brooklyn, New York City
- Education: Columbia College
- Occupation: Architect
- Spouse: Anna Lloyd Aspinwall (m. 1850; died 1880)
- Parent(s): James Renwick; Margaret Brevoort Renwick

James Renwick Jr. (November 11, 1818 – June 23, 1895) was an American architect known for designing churches and museums. He designed the Smithsonian Institution Building in Washington, D.C., and St. Patrick's Cathedral in New York. The Encyclopedia of American Architecture calls him "one of the most successful American architects of his time".

== Early life and education ==
Renwick was born in Bloomingdale in Upper Manhattan, New York City on November 11, 1818, to a wealthy and well-educated family. His mother, Margaret Brevoort, was from a wealthy and socially prominent New York City family. His father, James Renwick, was an engineer, architect, and professor of natural philosophy at Columbia College, which is now Columbia University. His two brothers went on to become engineers.

Renwick was not formally trained as an architect, but his ability and interest in building design were nurtured through his cultivated upbringing, which granted him early exposure to travel, and through a broad cultural education that included architectural history. He learned most of his skills from his father, and then studied engineering at Columbia College, now Columbia University, in Manhattan. He entered Columbia at age twelve and graduated in 1836. He received a M.A. three years later.

== Career ==
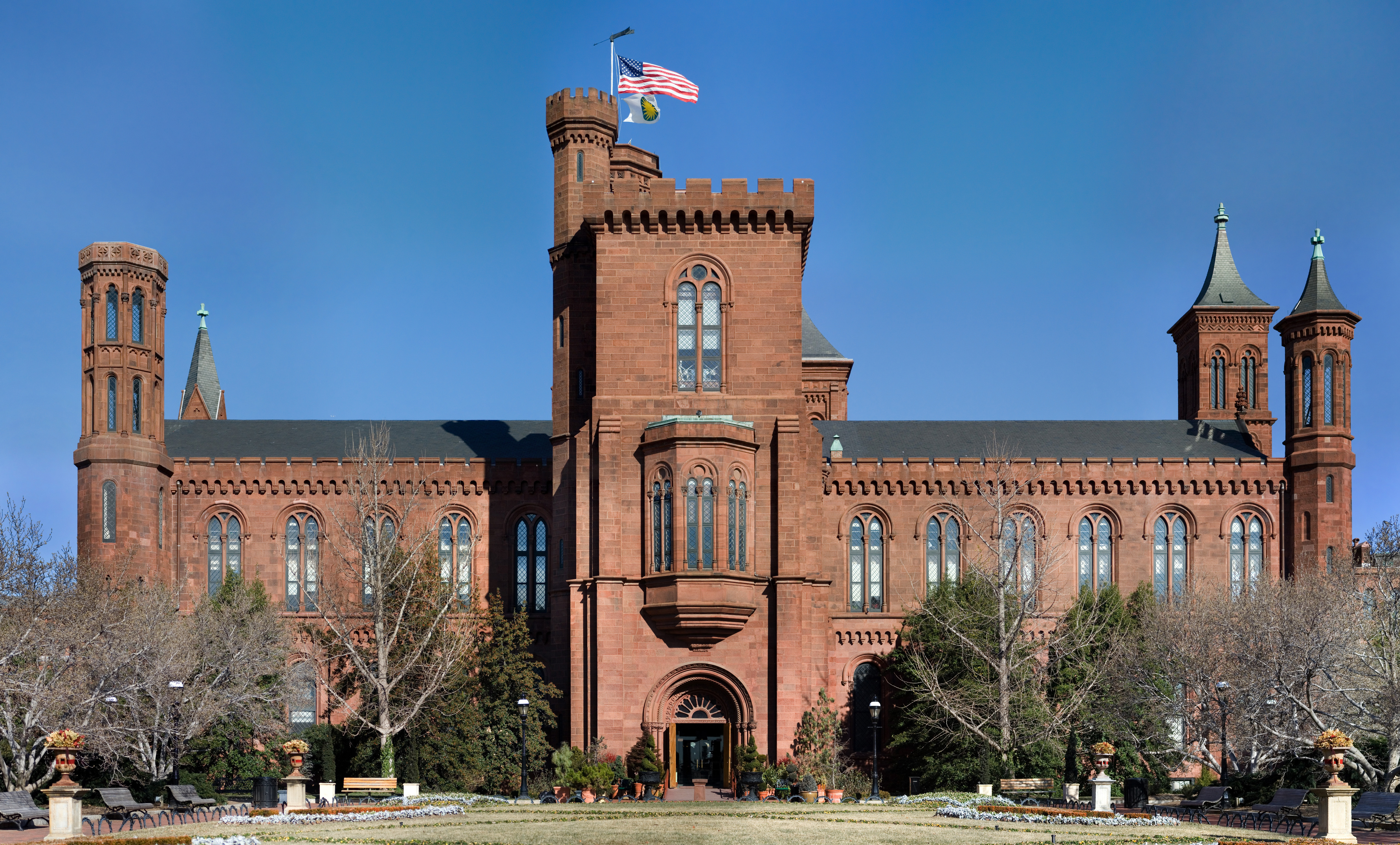
The Smithsonian Institution Building in Washington, D.C.

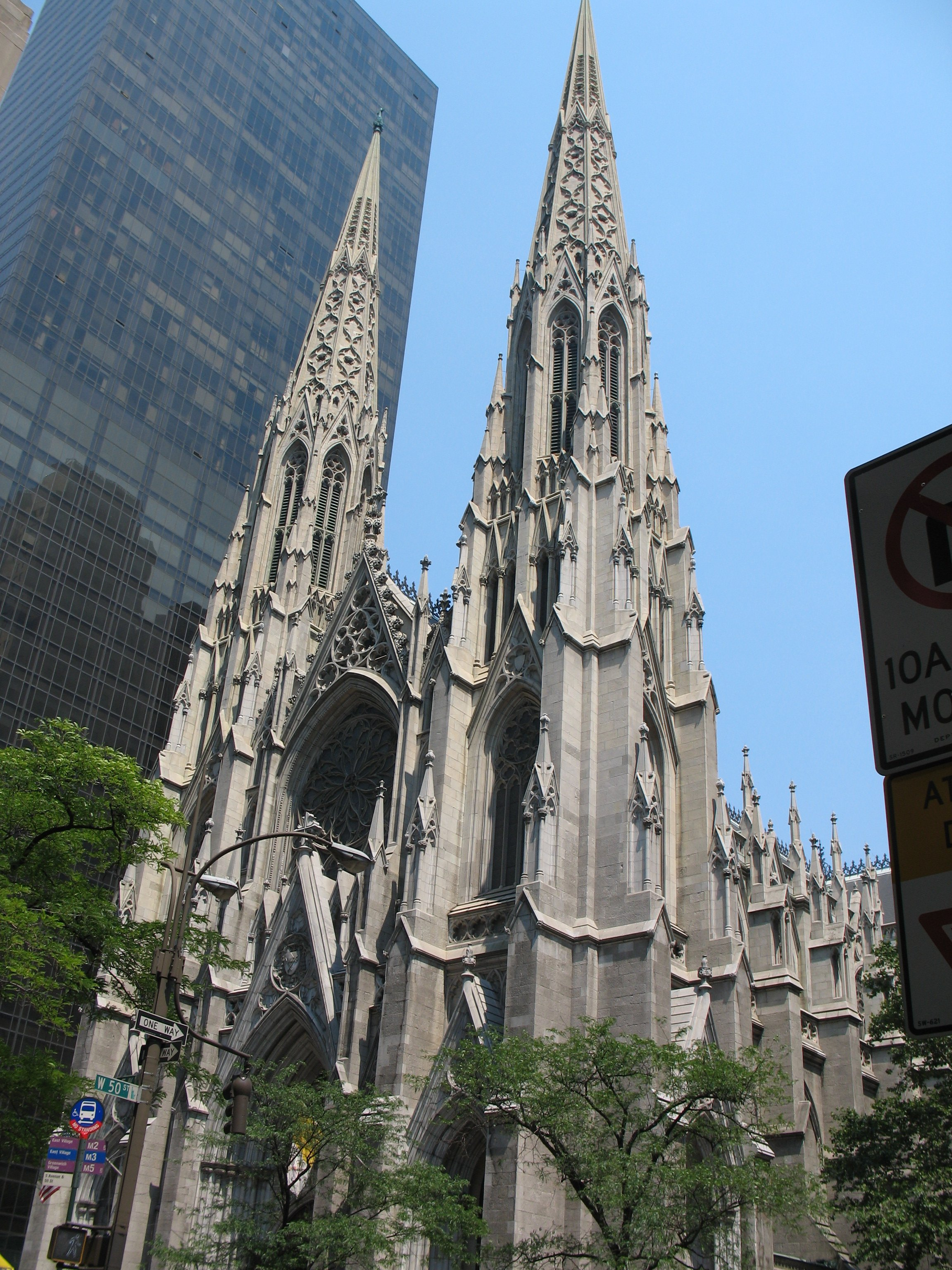
St. Patrick's Cathedral in Manhattan

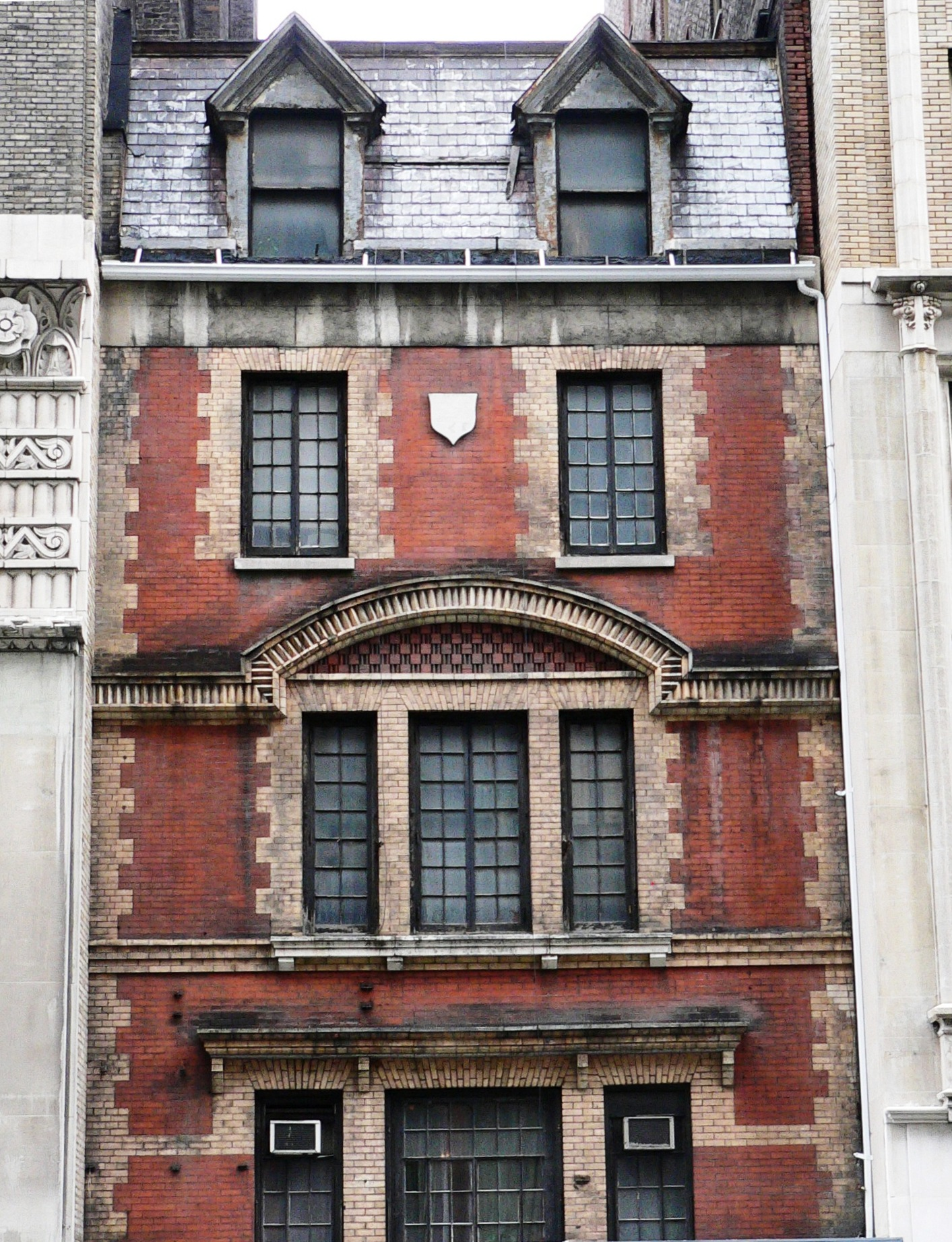
The floors above street level of First St. Anthony Hall Chapter House

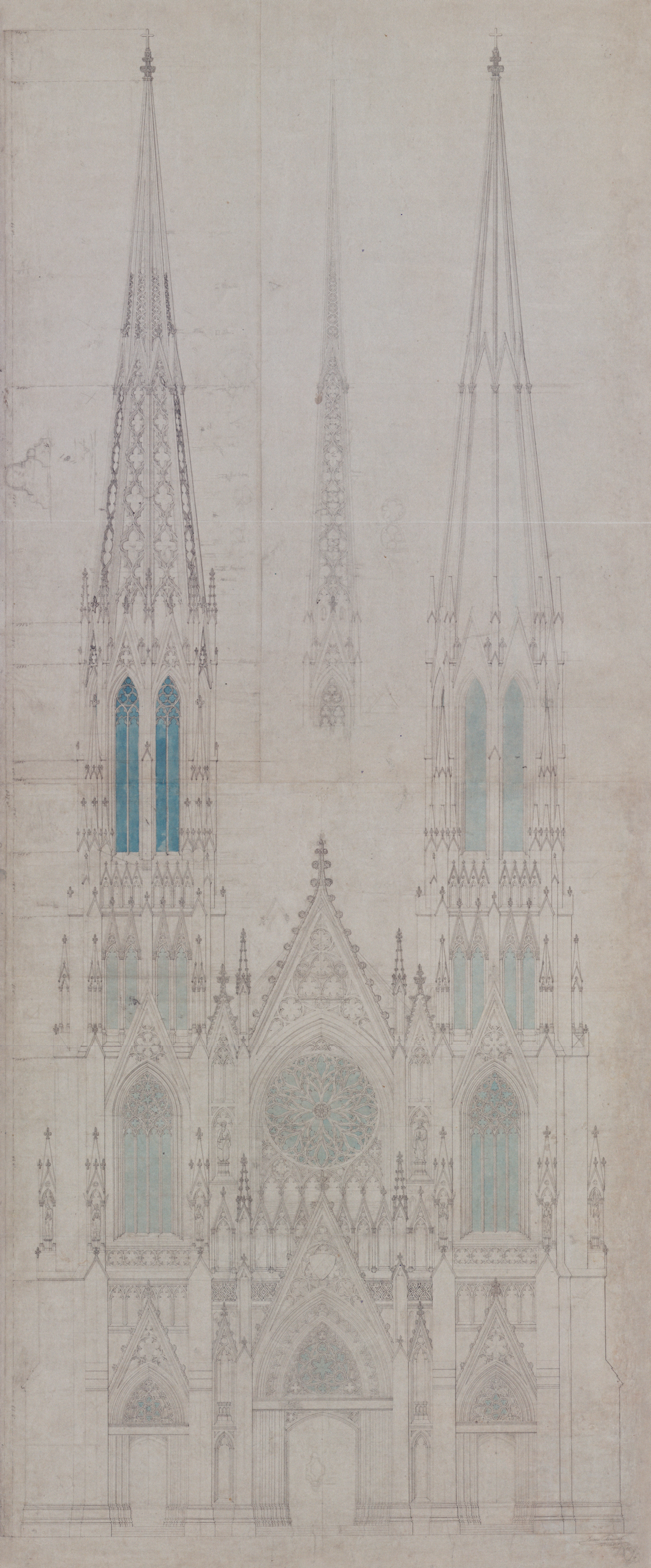
Exterior elevation drawing of the western facade of St. Patrick's Cathedral, by James Renwick, architect

After graduating from Columbia College, Renwick took a position as a structural engineer with Erie Railroad and subsequently served as supervisor on Croton Reservoir, serving as an assistant engineer on the Croton Aqueduct in New York City.

Renwick received his first major commission at the age of twenty-five in 1843, in which he won a competitive bidding process to design Grace Church, an Episcopal Church in New York City, which was built in English Gothic style. In 1846, Renwick won a competition to design of the Smithsonian Institution Building in Washington, D.C. Built between 1847 and 1855, the Smithsonian's many-turreted building, often referred to as "the Castle", was designed in Romanesque style, as requested by the Smithsonian's Board of Regents, and was built with red sandstone quarried at Seneca Quarry in Seneca, Maryland. The Smithsonian Institution Building proved influential in inspiring the Gothic Revival in the United States.

In 1849, Renwick designed the Free Academy Building at present-day City College of New York at Lexington Avenue and 23rd Street in New York City. It was one of the first Gothic Revival college buildings on the U.S. East Coast.

By 1852, he had come to Fredericksburg, VA -- a small city 50 miles south of Washington -- to design and build a courthouse building which still stands. He got into a dispute with the City Council, which then paid Renwick his $27,000 fee. The city then built the courthouse using his plans and reducing its dimensions to fit the local budget.

Renwick went on to design St. Patrick's Cathedral, on the corner of Fifth Avenue and 51st Street, which is considered his most notable architectural achievement. He was chosen as architect for the Roman Catholic cathedral in 1853; construction began in 1858, and the cathedral opened in May 1879. The cathedral is the most ambitious Gothic-style structure, and includes a mixture of German, French, and English Gothic influences.

Another of the prominent buildings Renwick designed was Corcoran Gallery of Art, now home to the Renwick Gallery in Washington, D.C., which was designed in Second Empire style. Other works by Renwick include the first major buildings on the campus of Vassar College in Poughkeepsie, New York (1861–1865), including the Main Hall (1860), Saint Bartholomew's Church (1871–1872) at Madison Avenue and 44th Street in New York City (since demolished), the All Saints' Roman Catholic Church (1882–1893) in Harlem in the Victorian Gothic style, and many mansions for the wealthy of the area, including the Peter Aims-Aimes house, known as "Martinstow", in West Haven, Connecticut. Renwick was the architect of Ascension Memorial Church in Ipswich, Massachusetts, whose cornerstone was laid in October 1869.

Renwick also designed the St. Anthony Hall, the first chapter house for Delta Psi, the secret fraternal college society founded at Columbia University in 1847. Even though the 1879 structure at 29 East 28th Street is marred now by a street level storefront, Christopher Gray wrote in The New York Times in 1990 that, "Old photographs show a high stoop arrangement with the figure of an owl on the peaked roof and a plaque with the Greek letters Delta Psi over the windowless chapter room. In 1879, The New York Tribune called it French Renaissance, but the stumpy pilasters and blocky detailing suggest the Neo-Grec style then near the end of its popularity." In 1899, the fraternity moved to a new chapter house on Riverside Drive and for a few years the original building was kept as a clubhouse for graduate members. At that time a newspaper account described it as a "perfect Bijou of tasteful decoration".

Among his other designs were banks, the Charity and Smallpox Hospitals on Roosevelt Island, the main building of the Children's Hospital on Randall's Island, the Inebriate and Lunatic Asylums on Wards Island, and the former facade of the New York Stock Exchange. Renwick was the supervising architect for the Commission of Charities and Correction. A small group of Renwick's architectural drawings and papers are held by the Avery Architectural and Fine Arts Library at Columbia University.

Renwick was also the designer of the bell tower of the Cathedral Basilica of St. Augustine in Florida, which was commissioned by Standard Oil partner Henry M. Flagler who was building luxury hotels in the historic city at the time. Renwick and his wife Anna Aspinwall lived and owned property in the lighthouse area on Anastasia Island in Florida.

In Spring 1890, Renwick listened to Franklin W. Smith deliver a speech to garner support for his Design and Prospectus for a National Gallery of History of Art at Washington. Renwick endorsed the idea and offered to provide drawings, plans, and illustrations for the project. Smith gratefully accepted, and the firm of Renwick, Aspinwall & Russell spent six months completing their contribution.

=== Firm history ===
In the late 1850s, already well-established, Renwick formed a partnership with Richard T. Auchmuty (1831–1893). In 1859 they were joined by Joseph Sands (1830–1879), a son of Ferdinand Sands, and the firm was renamed Renwick, Auchmuty & Sands. Beyond his description as a "convinced Gothicist," little is known of Sands. In 1861 Auchmuty withdrew to serve in the army during the American Civil War, and the firm was shortened to Renwick & Sands. Renwick's partnership with Sands proved to be his longest-enduring. Their commissions included the Church of the Holy Sepulchre in New York City in 1869, and the former New York City Public Charities Building (since razed) at 66 Third Avenue (1868–1871). Sands withdrew from the firm in 1877, two years before his death.

For the next six years Renwick was again a sole practitioner. In 1883 he formed the new partnership of Renwick, Aspinwall & Russell with J. Lawrence Aspinwall (1854–1936), his wife's cousin, and William Hamilton Russell (1856–1907), his grand nephew. Both had worked for him as draftsmen since the 1870s. After his graduation from Columbia University Russell became a protégé of his great uncle, who designed the chapter house of Russell's fraternity, St. Anthony Hall, on East 28th Street. It is likely Russell contributed work to both his fraternity's first chapter house during his apprenticeship.

Russell withdrew in 1891 and the firm was reorganized as Renwick, Aspinwall & Renwick with the addition of William W. Renwick (1864–1933), Renwick's nephew. One of the last major works completed by the firm during the elder Renwick's lifetime was the George Walter Vincent Smith Art Museum in Springfield, Massachusetts, dedicated about two months before his death.

== Death and legacy ==
After Renwick's death in 1895, the organization initially continued as Renwick, Aspinwall & Renwick before being changed to Renwick, Aspinwall & Owen with the addition of Walter Tallant Owen (1864–1902), who had been the principal designer of the Springfield art museum. In 1904, it became known as Renwick, Aspinwall & Tucker, then Renwick, Aspinwall & Guard by the late 1920s. Aspinwall was head of the firm until his own death. He was elected an AIA Fellow in 1914.

Renwick died in New York City. He is buried with his wife and father in Green-Wood Cemetery in Brooklyn.

=== Notable employees ===
Several of Renwick's employees and protégés became influential architects, including:

- Bertram Grosvenor Goodhue, whose designs included the Wolf's Head Secret Society Hall at Yale University, the Nebraska State Capitol building in Lincoln, Nebraska, Balboa Park in San Diego, and the chapel at the United States Military Academy in West Point, New York. He began his apprenticeship at Renwick, Aspinwall and Russell in 1884, and his apprenticeship ended in 1891 when he won a national design competition for St. Matthew's in Dallas. His first years with Renwick's firm partly coincided with Russell's first years.
- John Wellborn Root, one of the founders of the Chicago School-style of architecture.

Other notable employees include:

- Franz J. Berlenbach Jr., architect of Brooklyn.
- H. Edwards Ficken of New York City.
- Albert Hamilton Kipp of Wilkes-Barre, Pennsylvania.
- Guy Kirkham of Springfield, Massachusetts.
- Joseph Ladd Neal of Pittsburgh.
- Edwin A. Quick of Yonkers, New York.

=== Major buildings designed ===
- The Reformed Church of Saugerties, 173 Main St., Saugerties, NY (1852)
- Mark Twain House, 21 Fifth Avenue, NYC (c. 1842; razed 1953)
- Grace Church, New York (1843–1846)
- Smithsonian Institution Building, Washington, D.C. (1847–1855)
- Calvary Church, New York (1848)
- Free Academy Building, City College of New York, Lexington Avenue and 23rd Street, New York City (1849)
- Oak Hill Cemetery Chapel, Washington, D.C. (1850)
- Rhinelander Gardens, 110-124 West 11th Street, NYC, a three-story above raised basement row of houses (c. 1850; razed 1956)
- Trinity Episcopal Church, Washington, D.C. (1851; razed 1936)
- Municipal Courthouse, 817 Princess Anne Street, Fredericksburg, Virginia (1852)
- St. Patrick's Cathedral, New York, (1858–1879)
- Corcoran Gallery of Art (currently the Renwick Gallery), Washington, D.C. (1859–1871)
- Main Building, Vassar College, Poughkeepsie, New York (1861–1865)
- Cathedral of Our Merciful Saviour, Faribault, Minnesota (1862–1869)
- Church of St. Barnabas expansion, Irvington, New York (1863)
- St. Ann's Church, Clinton and Livingston, Brooklyn, New York (1866-1869)
- St. Mary's Episcopal Church, Foggy Bottom, Washington, DC (1867).
- Greymore Friars' Residence, NYC (1869)
- Cathedral High School, NYC (1869)
- First Presbyterian Church of Hartford, Connecticut (1870; Renwick & Sands)
- Basilica of St. John the Baptist, Canton, Ohio (1871)
- St. Bartholomew's Church, Madison Avenue and East 44th Street, NYC (1871–1872; razed)
- Second Presbyterian Church, Chicago (1872–1874)
- St. Claire's Chapel, St. Mary Help of Christians Church, Aiken, South Carolina (1879)
- Former St. Anthony Hall Chapter House, New York (c. 1879)
- St. Nicholas of Myra Church, East 10th Street, NYC (1882–1883)
- Demarest Building, Fifth Avenue and East 33rd Street, NYC (c. 1890)
- George Walter Vincent Smith Art Museum, Springfield, Massachusetts (1895)

== Gallery ==
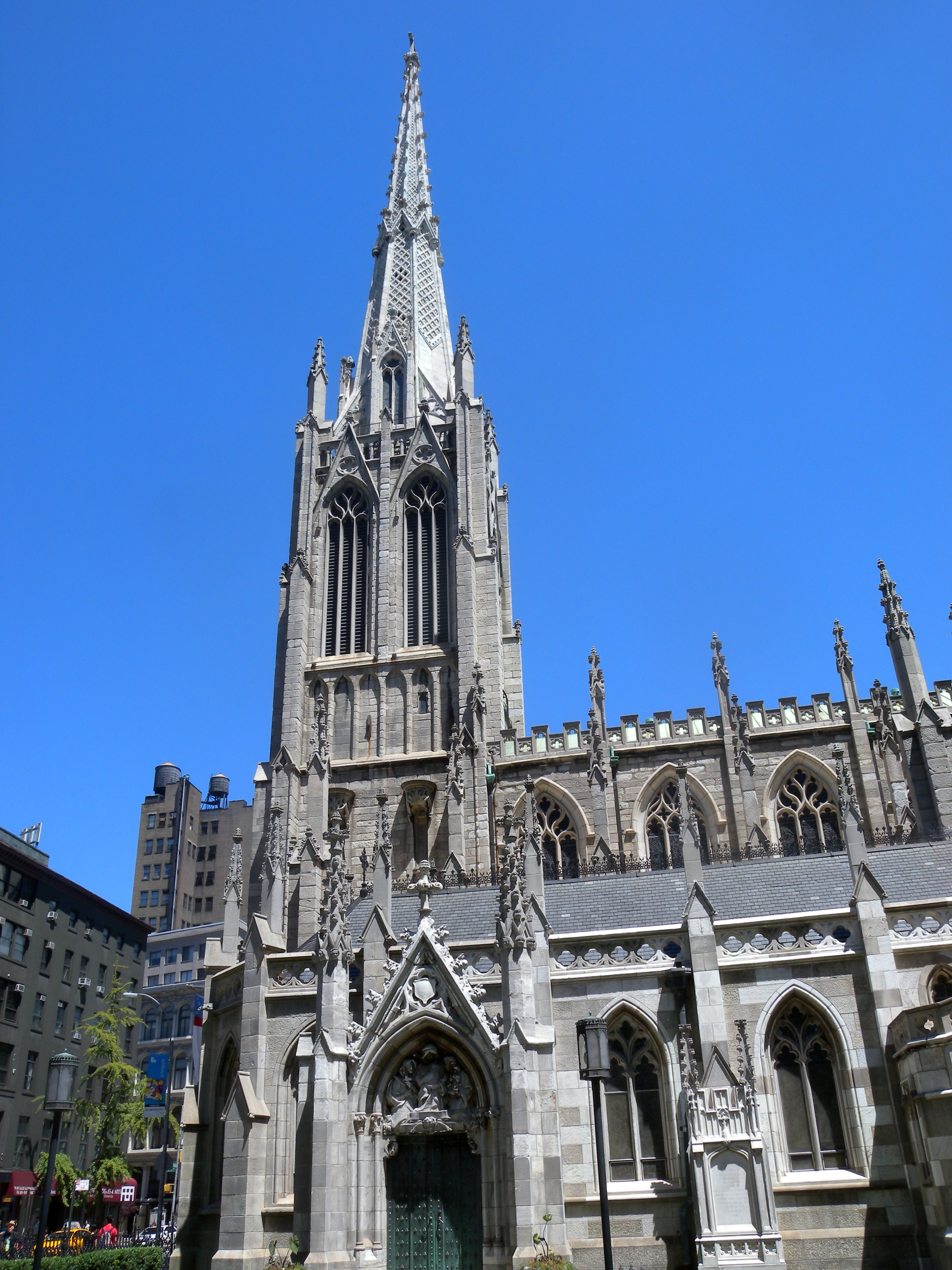
Grace Church
(1846)
Manhattan, New York City

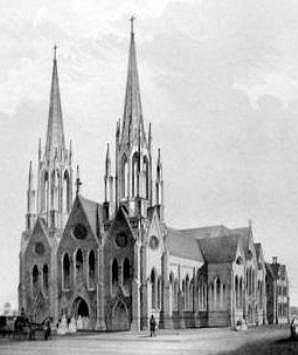
Calvary Church
(1848)
Manhattan, New York City

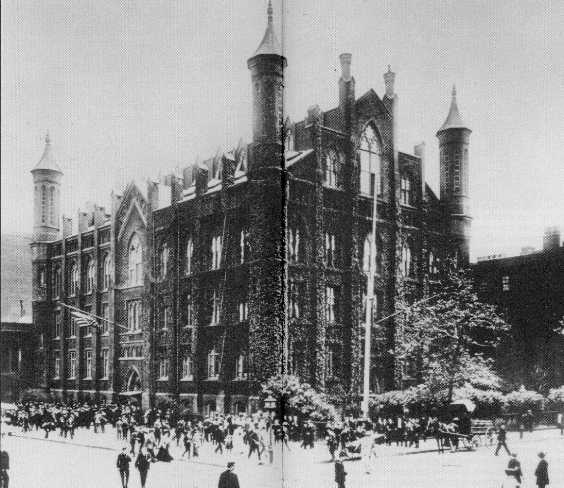
The Free Academy
(1847)
Manhattan, New York City

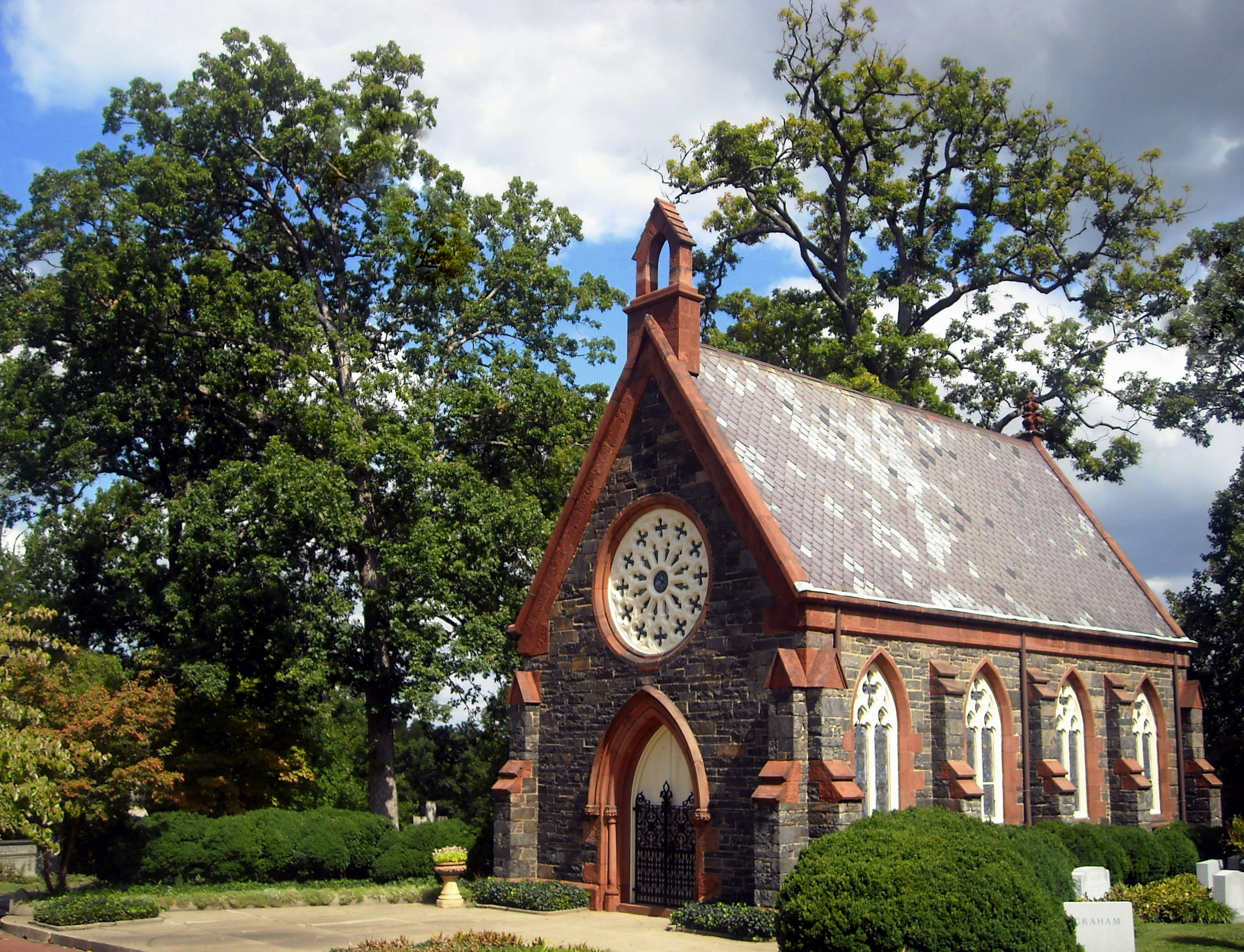
Oak Hill Cemetery
(1850)
Georgetown, Washington D.C.

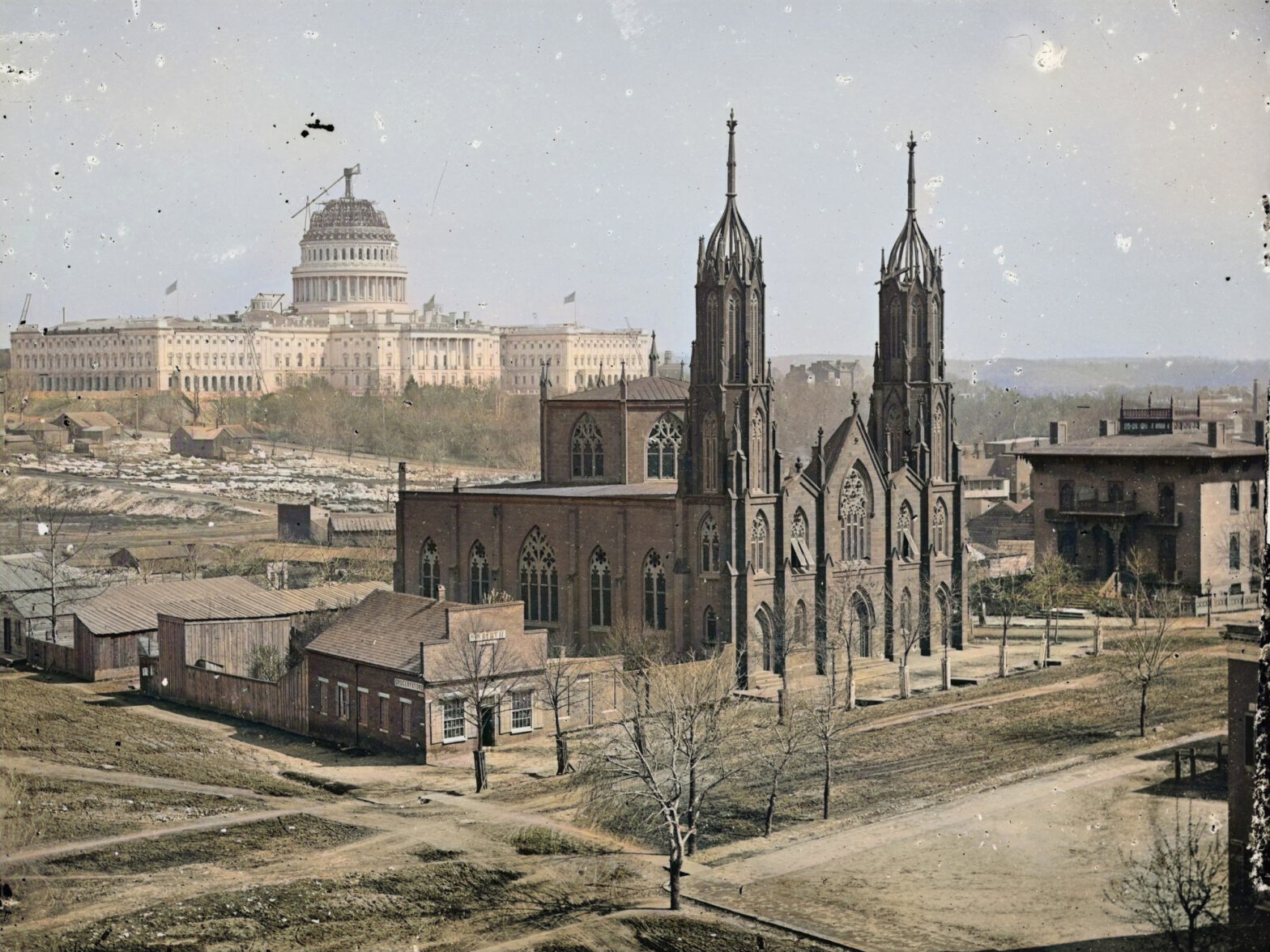
Trinity Episcopal Church
(1851)
Washington, D.C.

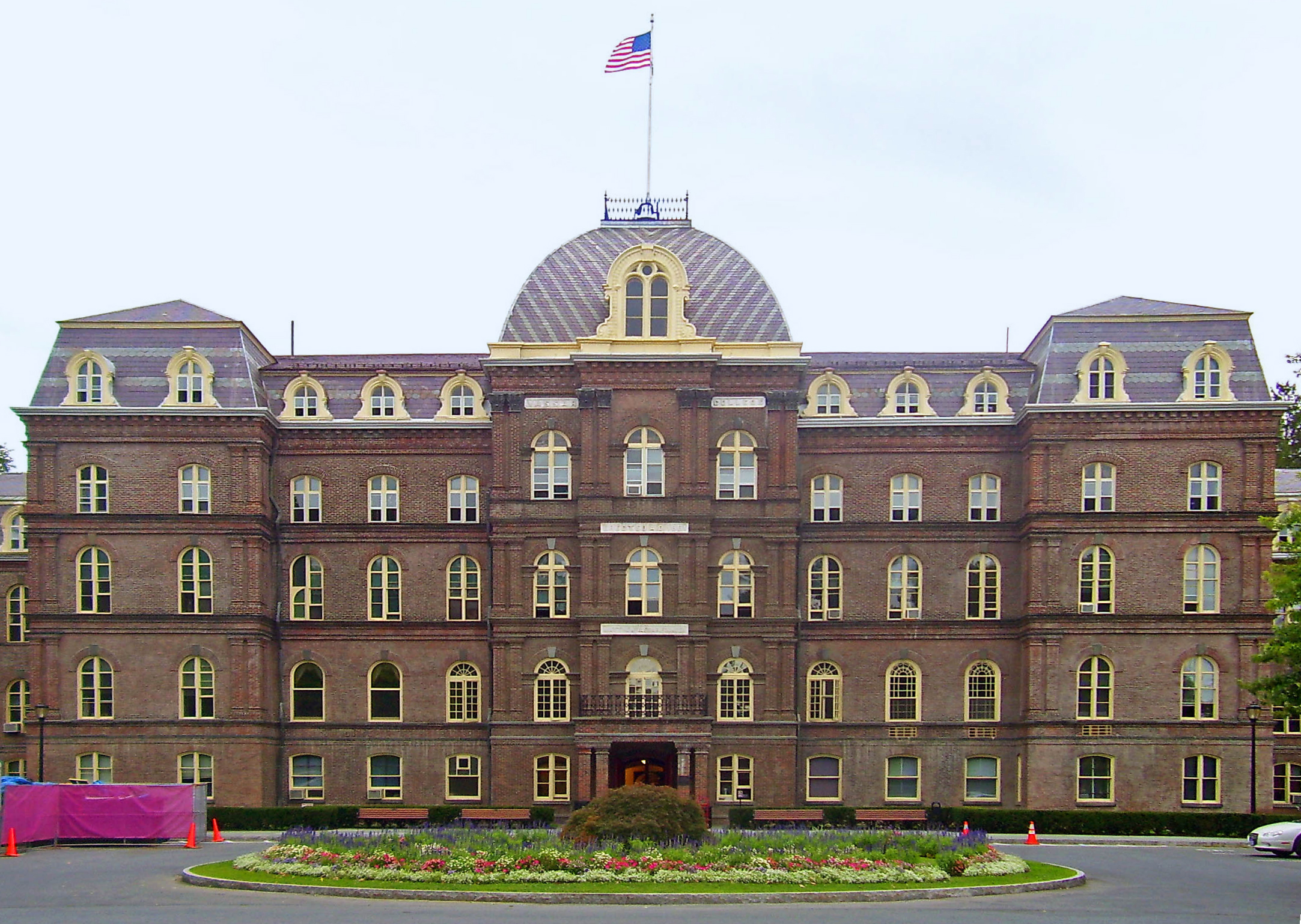
Old Main, Vassar College
(1861)
Poughkeepsie, New York

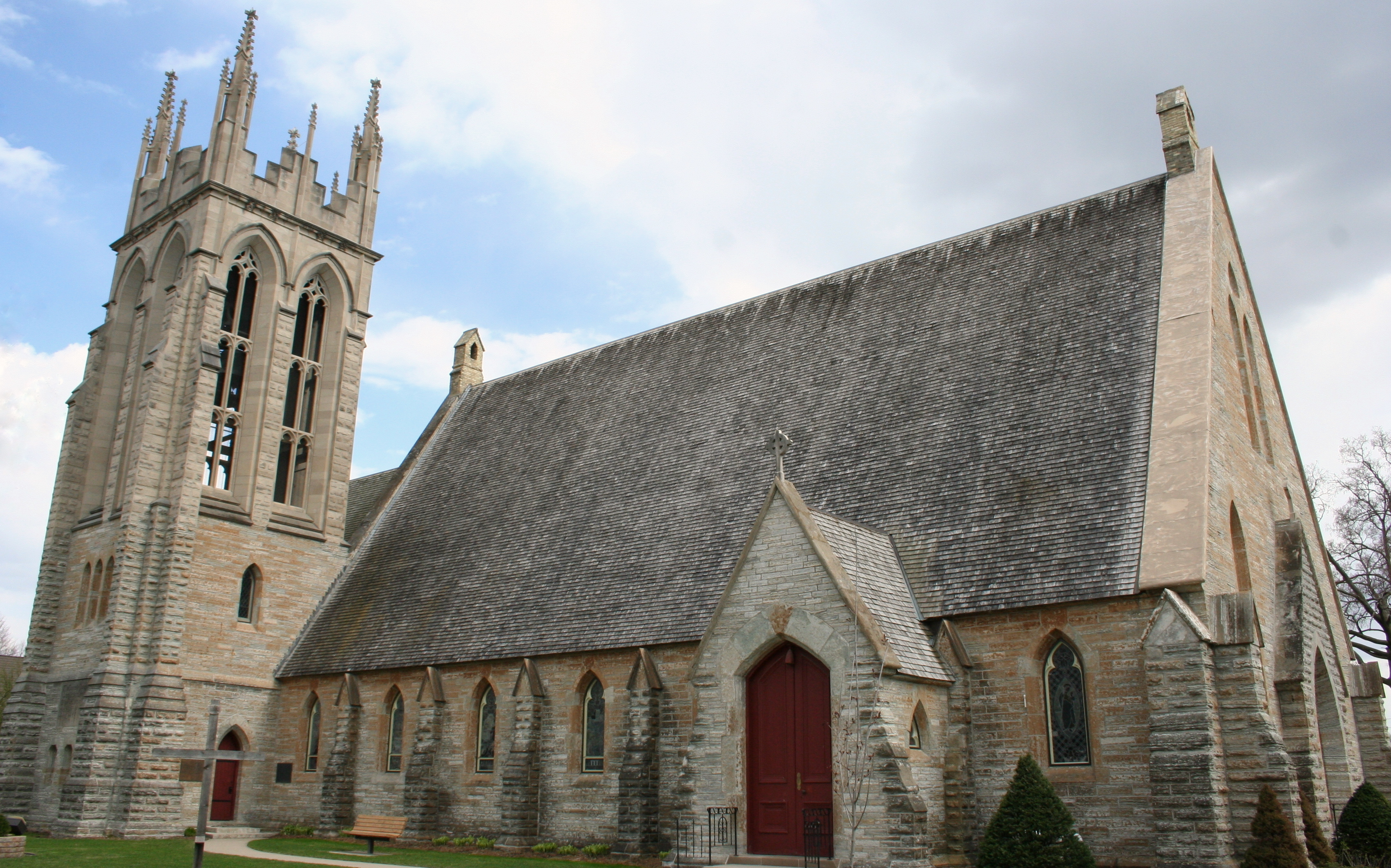
Cathedral of Our Merciful Saviour
(1869)
Faribault, Minnesota

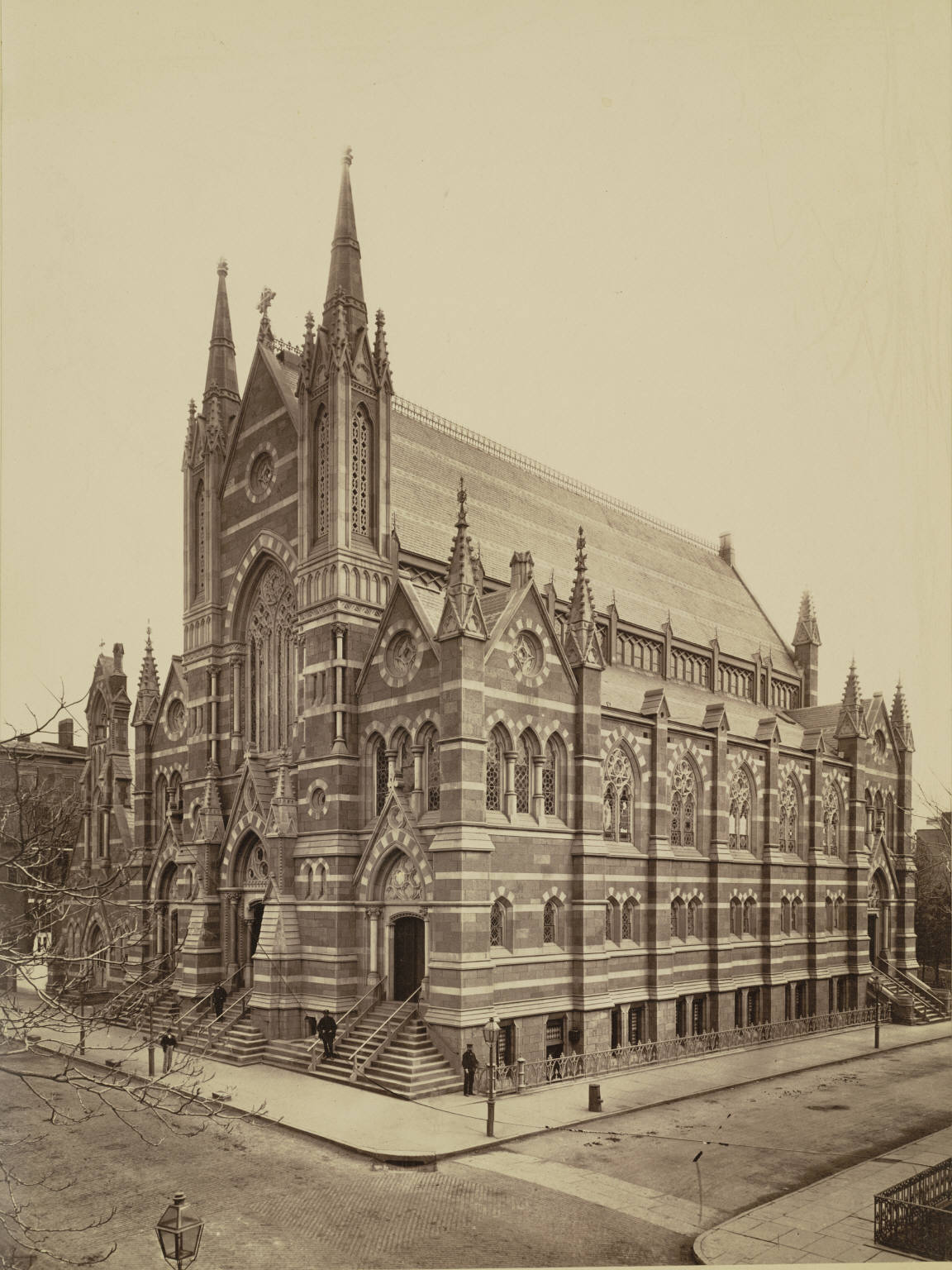
St. Ann's Episcopal Church
(1869)
Brooklyn, New York City

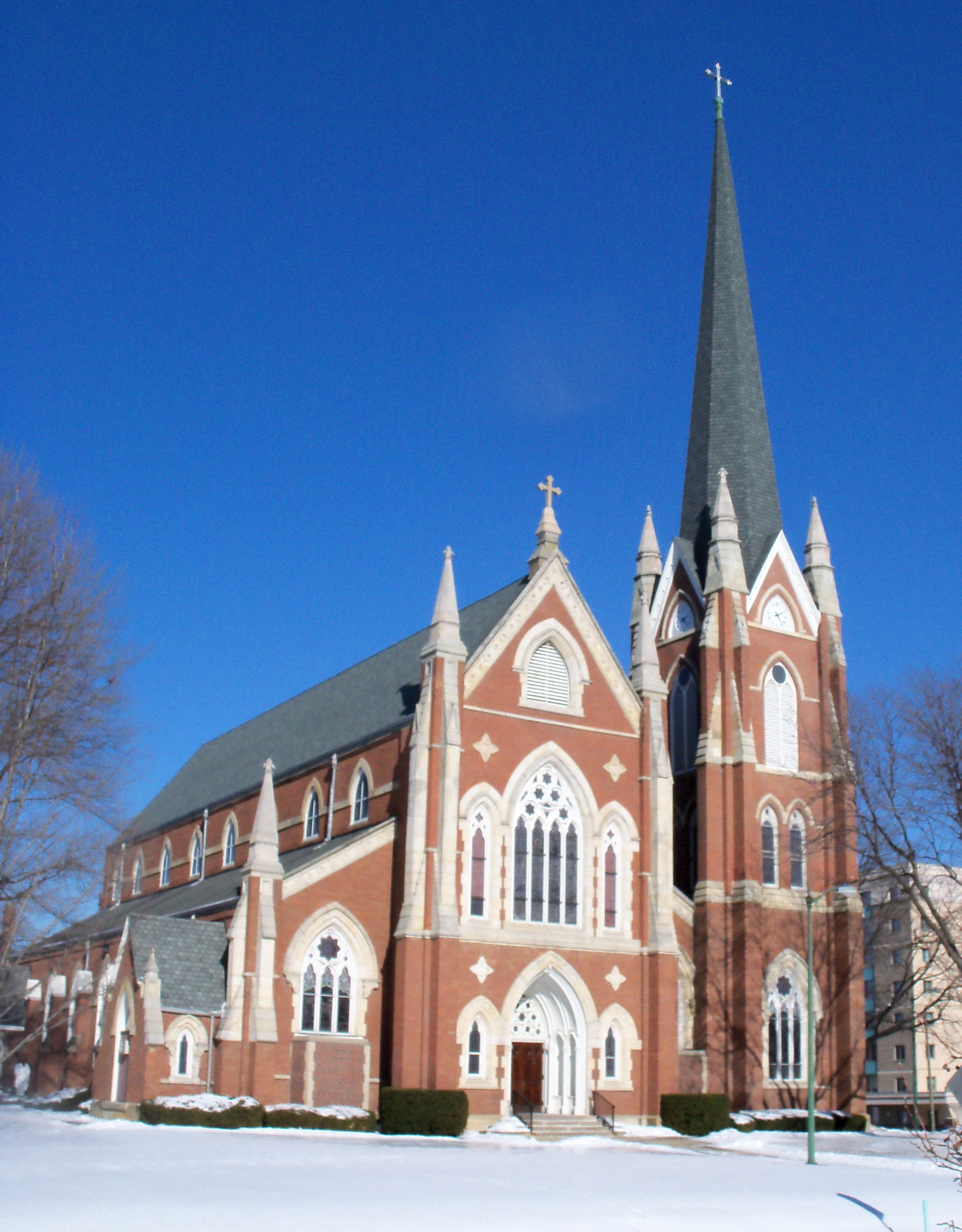
Basilica of St. John the Baptist (1871)
Canton, Ohio

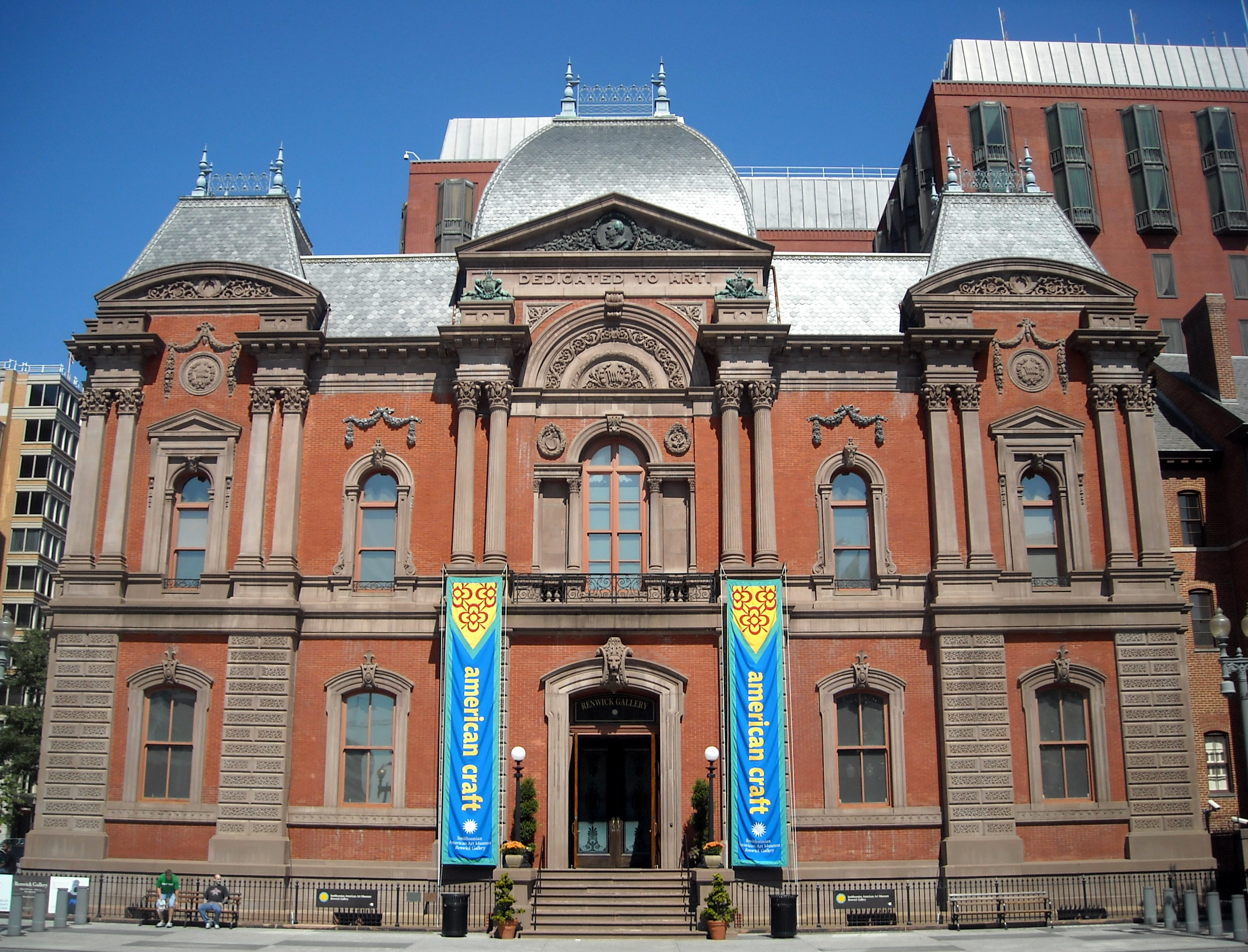
Renwick Gallery
(1874)
Washington D.C.

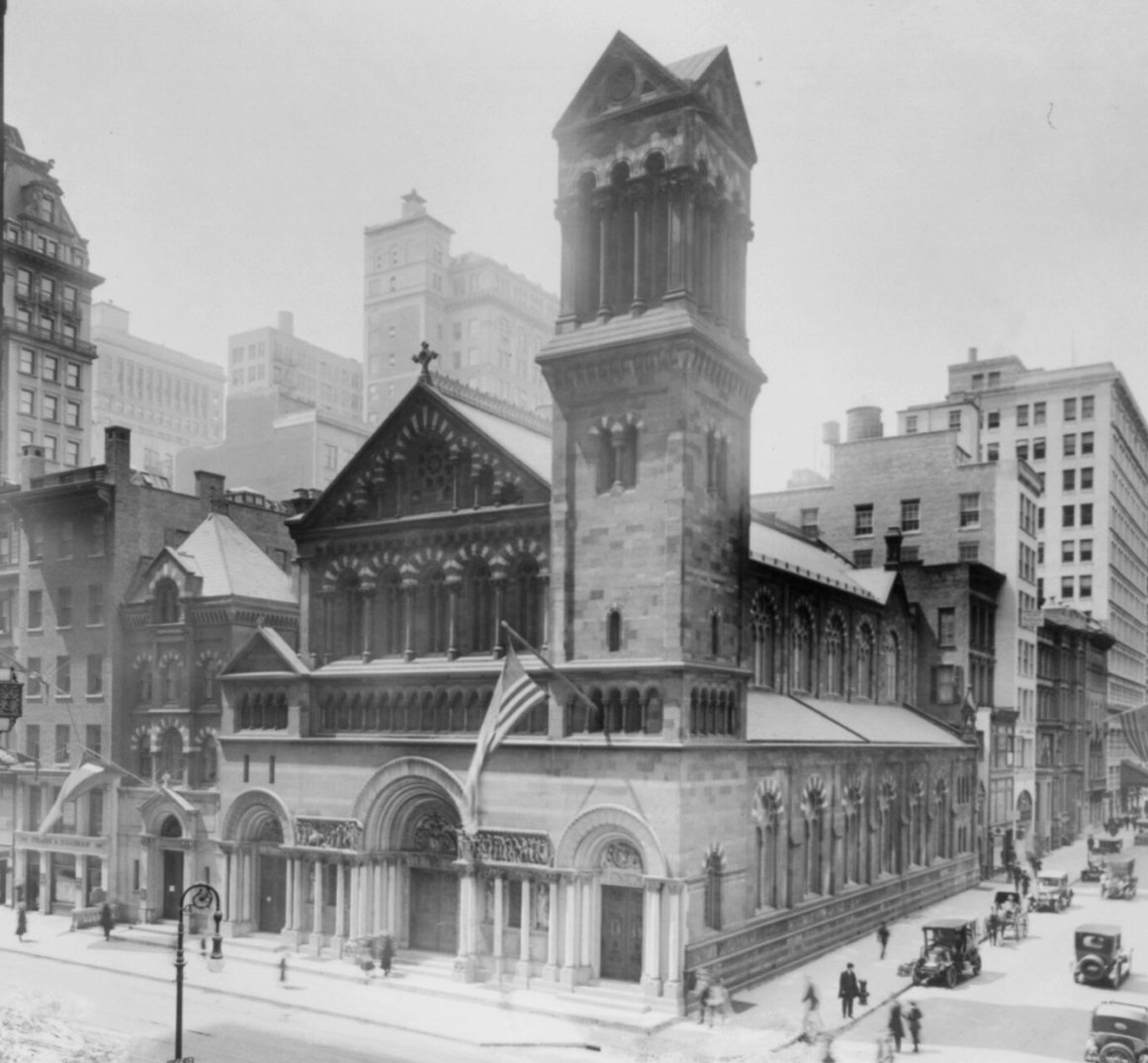
St. Bartholomew's Church
(1871–72)
Manhattan, New York City

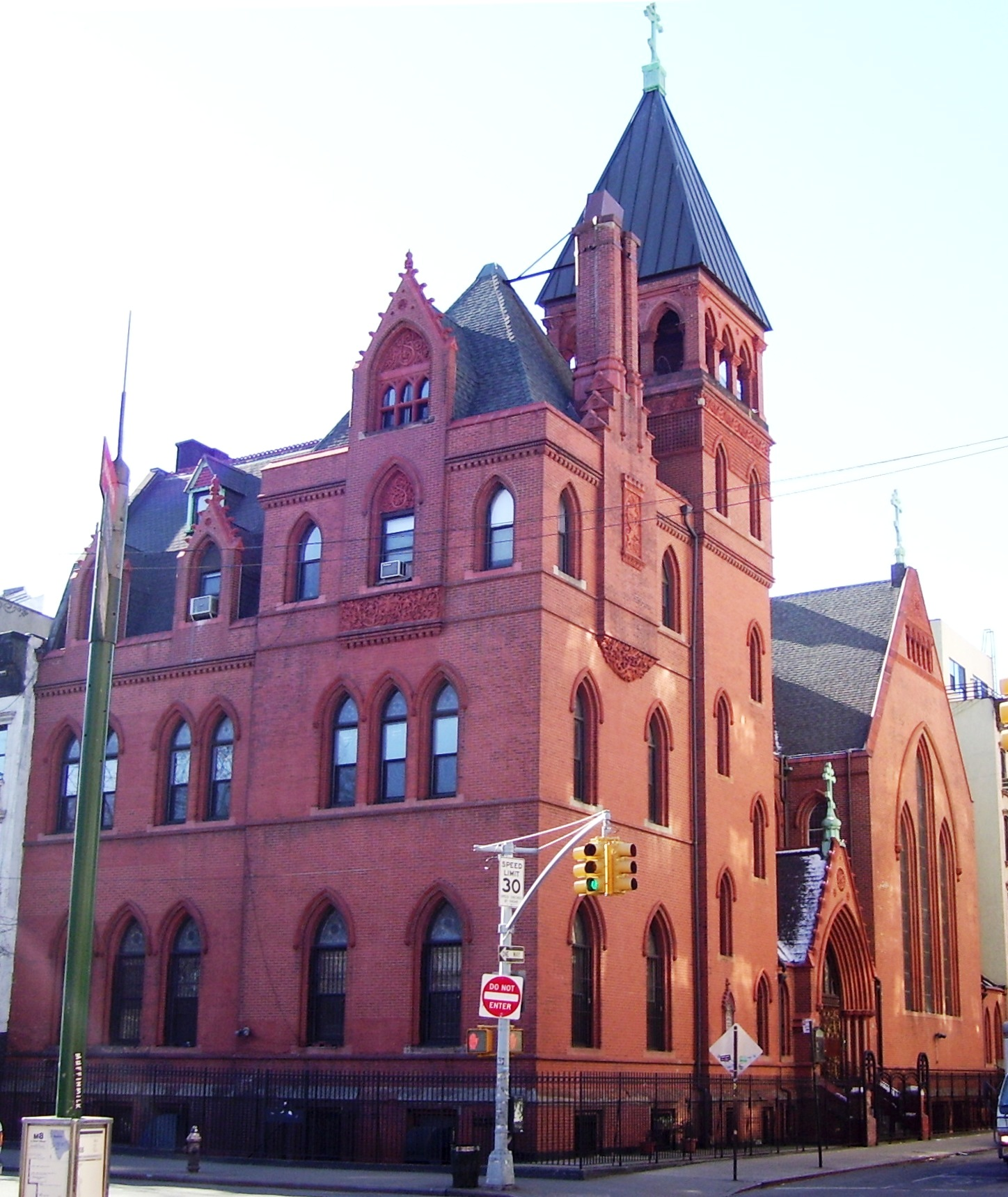
St. Nicholas of Myra Church
(1883)
Manhattan, New York City

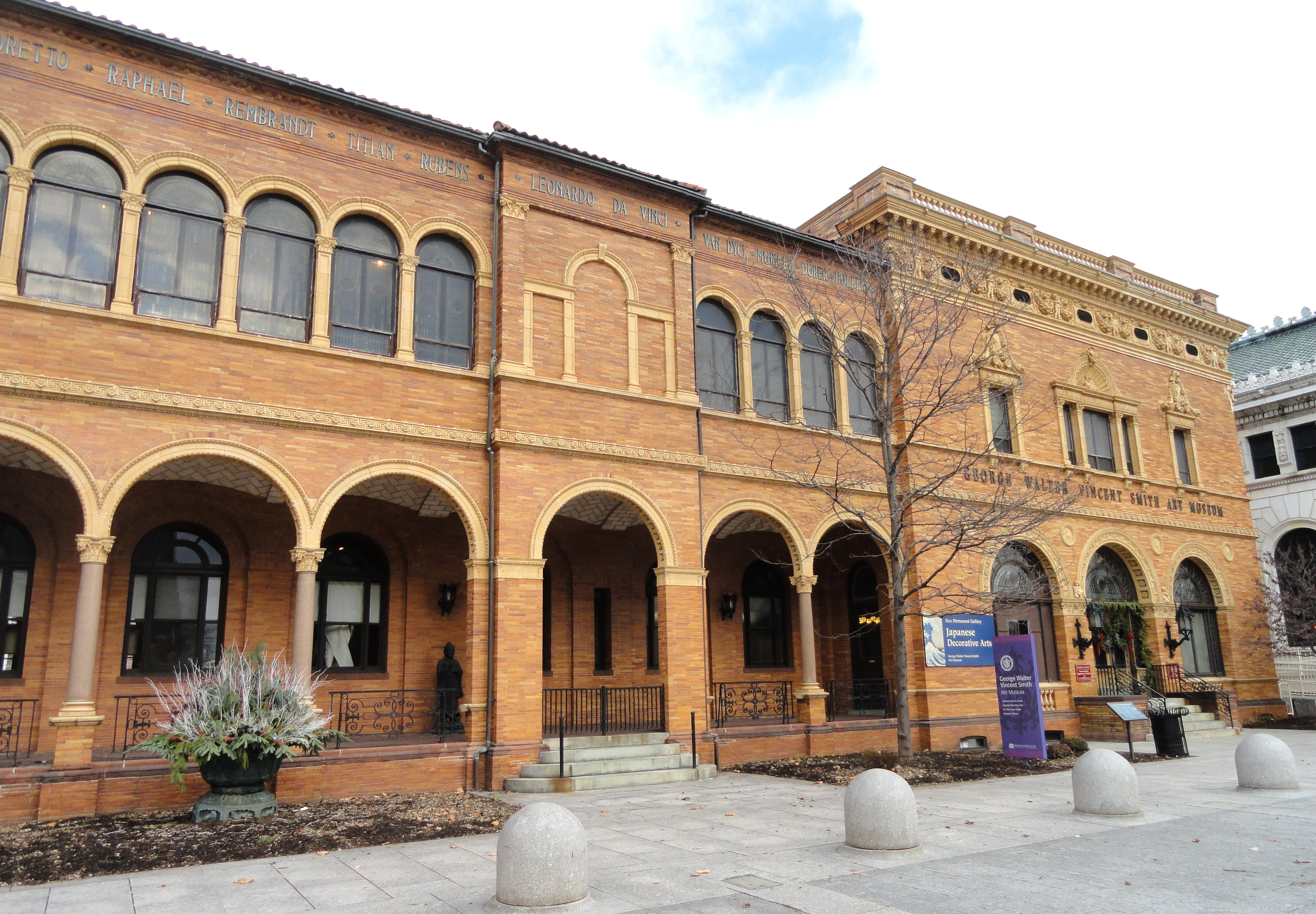
George Walter Vincent Smith Art Museum
(1895)
Springfield, Massachusetts
