= Somers Library =

Coordinates: 41.303293°N 73.714236°W

- Branch of: Westchester Library System

The Somers Library is a member of the Westchester Library System. The present building opened in 1982. It is located in Reis Park off New York State Route 139 in Somers, NY.

== History ==
The first library in Somers was organized by Ruth Tompkins in 1875. It consisted of a shelf of books on the second floor of District Schoolhouse Number 2. A portion of the books in the original collection came from Ralph Waldo Emerson's private library. Ruth Tomkins' sister Susan had married John Emerson, nephew of Ralph Waldo Emerson and through them Ralph Waldo Emerson, or "Uncle Waldo", became one of the library's first patrons.

The reasons for the move are unclear, but in the early 1880s the Library moved to a converted chicken coop across the street from the schoolhouse. It remained at the refurbished chicken coop for 14 years.

In 1896, the Library outgrew the chicken coop and moved into a former cobbler's shop. The cobbler's shop location later became the Elephant's Trunk Thrift Shop, which was run by Friends of the Somers Library to provide money for the Library's operation. In 1963, the Library outgrew the cobbler's shop and moved across the street to the former cobbler's house, which was refurbished for the Library's use.

The present building is located on a portion of the Wright-Reis Homestead and opened in 1981. In 2022 there are plans to refurbish the building.

== Present day ==
Items can be borrowed from the library by members of the Westchester Library System. The library has a reading room that holds newspapers and periodicals. There is also a seed library.

The library is supported by a Friends group.
