= Edwin A. Quick =

American architect

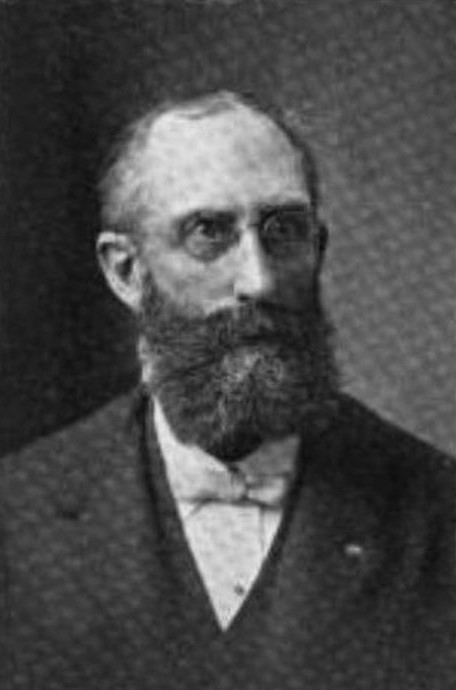
- Edwin A. Quick, 1900
- Born: May 24, 1841; Rhinebeck, New York
- Died: October 19, 1913 (aged 72); Yonkers, New York
- Occupation: Architect
- Practice: E. A. Quick; E. A. Quick & Son

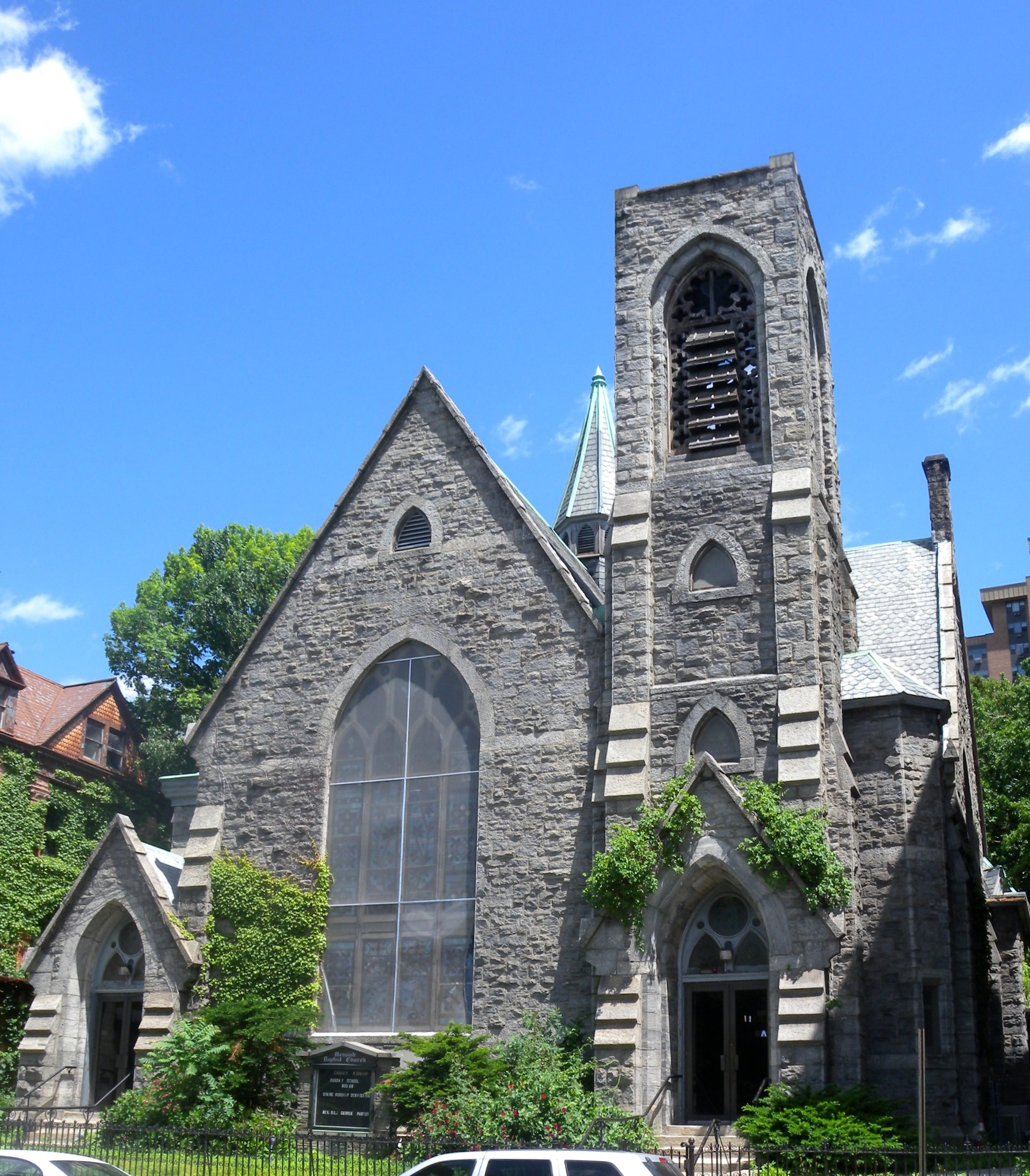
Messiah Baptist Church, Yonkers, 1887.

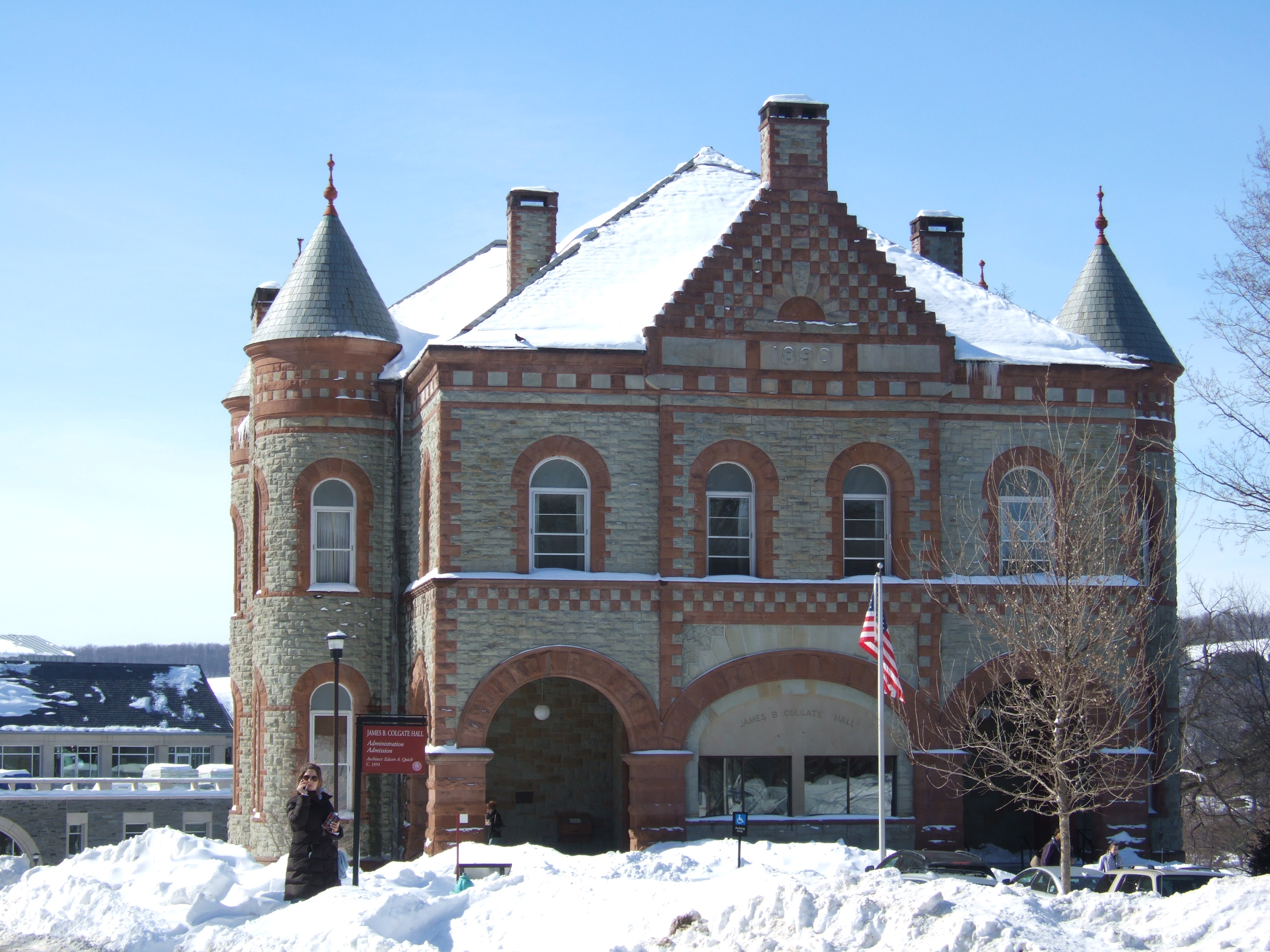
Colgate Library, Colgate University, 1889.

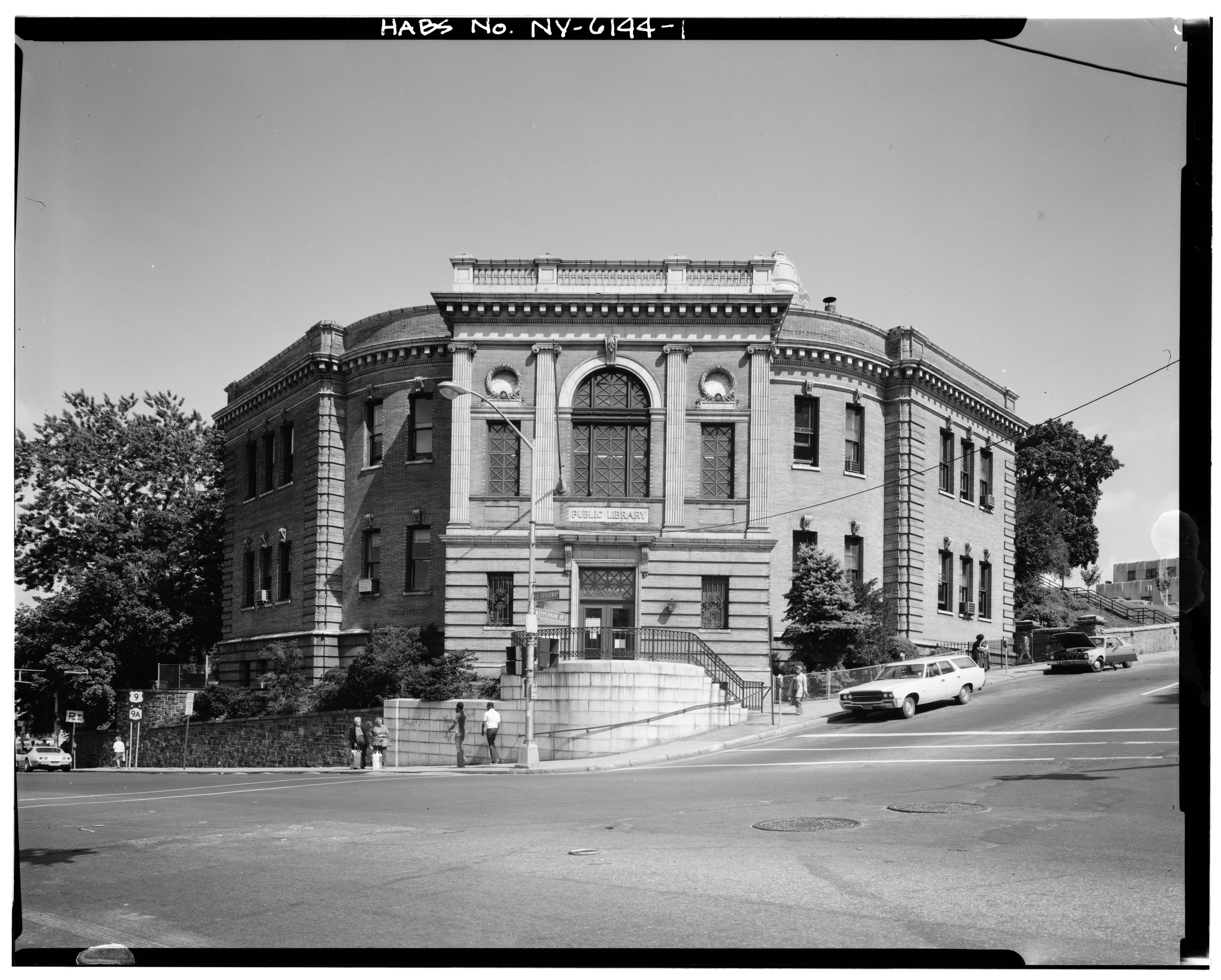
Yonkers Public Library, Yonkers, 1903.

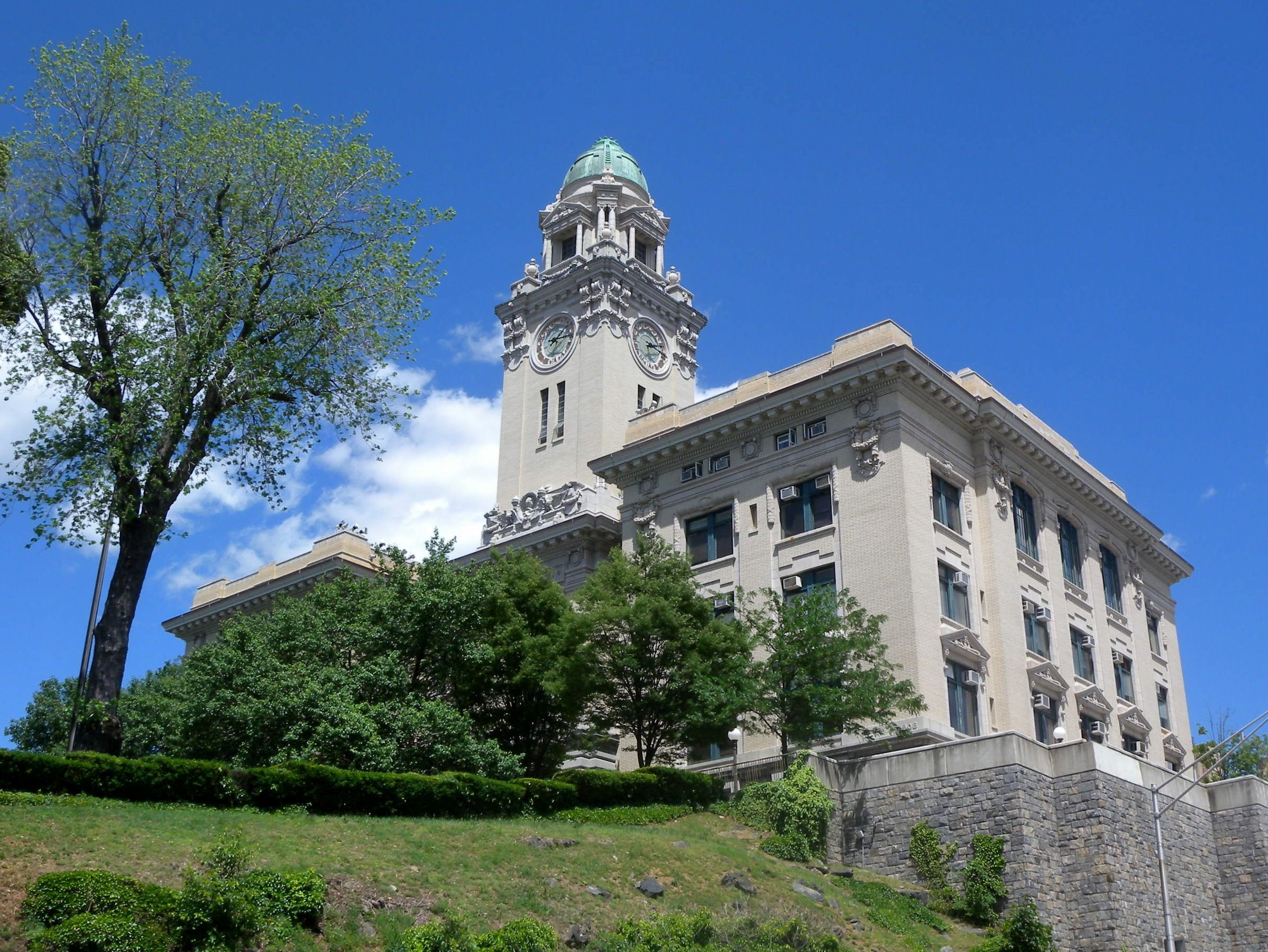
Yonkers City Hall, Yonkers, 1908.

Edwin A. Quick (1841-1913) was an American architect practicing in Yonkers, New York, directly north of New York City.

== Life and career ==
Edwin Quick was born in 1841 in Rhinebeck, New York, where he attended the Rhinebeck Academy. He studied architecture, and worked as a construction superintendent in New York in the 1860s and 1870s, working for Gilman & Kendall, J. William Schickel, and Renwick & Sands. He moved to Yonkers in April, 1874. He was practicing independently as an architect by 1882. Circa 1891 he made his son, H. Lansing Quick, a partner in the firm, which became Edwin A. Quick & Son. The two practiced together until 1913, upon the elder Quick's death.

Quick died on October 19, 1913, at his home in Yonkers.

== Architectural works ==
=== E. A. Quick, before 1891 ===
- 1887 - Messiah Baptist Church, 76 Warburton Ave, Yonkers, New York
- 1889 - Colgate Library (Former), Colgate University, Hamilton, New York
- 1890 - Dayspring Presbyterian Church, 320 Walnut St, Yonkers, New York
  - Destroyed.
- 1891 - Leslie M. Saunders House (Greystone), 1 Greystone Ter, Yonkers, New York

=== E. A. Quick & Son, 1891-1913 ===
- 1891 - Macedonia Baptist Church, 243 Pershing Dr, Ansonia, Connecticut
- 1891 - Nodine Hill Water Tower, Elm St, Yonkers, New York
  - Collapsed in 1937.
- 1893 - Westchester County Hall of Records, 166 Main St, White Plains, New York
  - Demolished.
- 1894 - Yonkers City Hospital, 1 Ridge Hill Blvd, Yonkers, New York
  - Demolished.
- 1896 - Citizens' National Bank Building, 6 S Broadway, Yonkers, New York
  - Demolished.
- 1896 - McCann Building, 25 N Broadway, Yonkers, New York
- 1899 - Merrill (President's) House, Colgate University, Hamilton, New York
- 1900 - Hamilton High School, 35 Broad St, Hamilton, New York
  - Demolished.
- 1900 - Anna J. Ivers Apartments, 37 Oak St, Yonkers, New York
- 1900 - New York Telephone Co. Exchange Building, 47 S 6th Ave, Mount Vernon, New York
- 1901 - Dayspring Presbyterian Church, 320 Walnut St, Yonkers, New York
- 1901 - Henry R. Hicks House, 303 S Broadway, Yonkers, New York
  - Demolished.
- 1901 - Oak Street Firehouse, 81 Oak St, Yonkers, New York
- 1903 - Yonkers Public Library, 70 S Broadway, Yonkers, New York
  - Demolished in 1982.
- 1908 - Yonkers City Hall, 40 S Broadway, Yonkers, New York
- 1912 - Hamilton Theatre, 9 Main St, Yonkers, New York
  - Demolished in 1927.
