= Yonkers Public Library =

Library in Yonkers, New York, United States

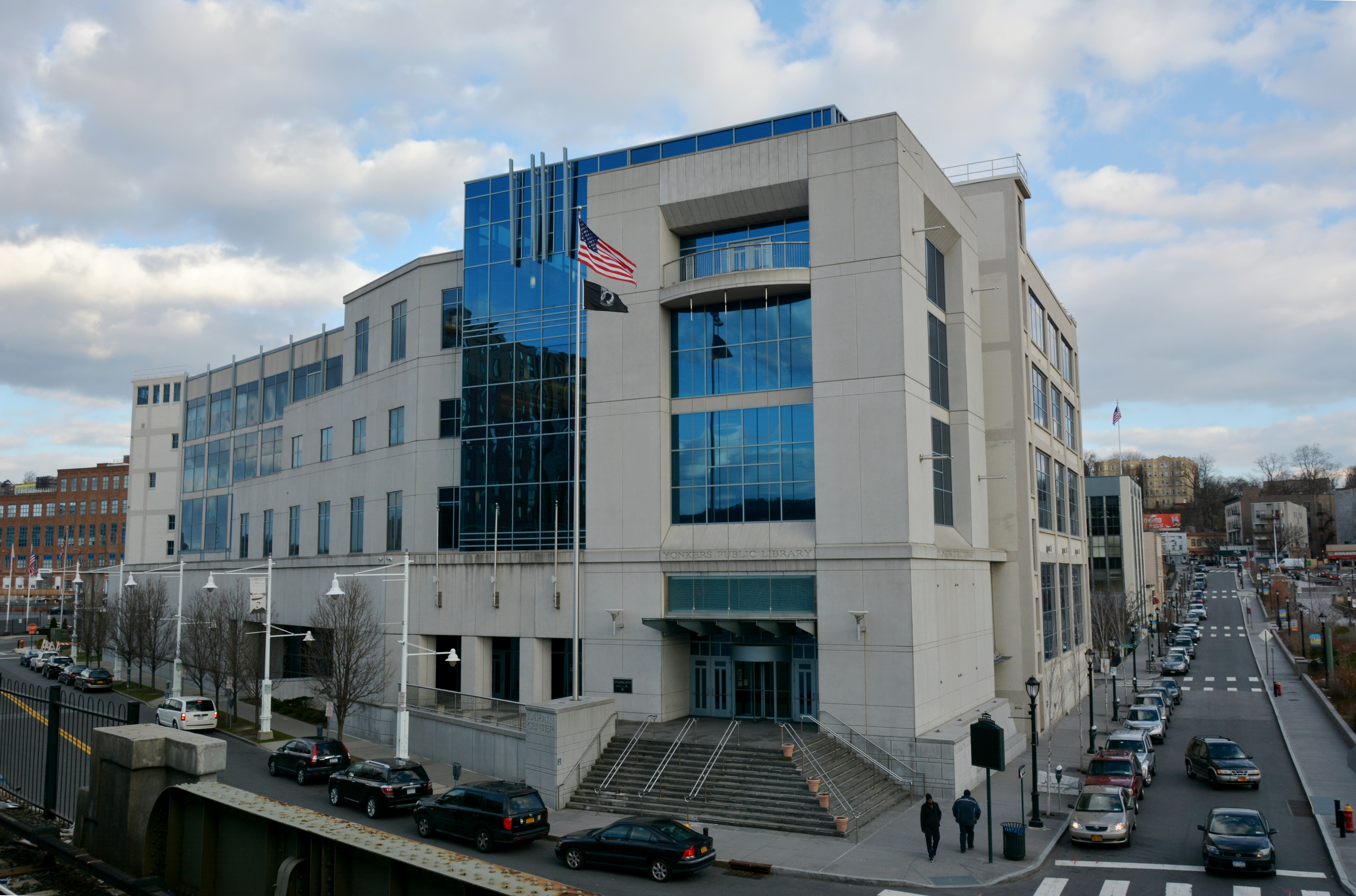
- The Yonkers Riverfront Library
- 40.93597°N 73.90148°W
- Location: Yonkers, New York
- Established: 1883
- Branches: 3

Collection
- Size: 420,286 (2025)

Access and use
- Circulation: 691,963 (2025)
- Members: 67,494 (2024)

Other information
- Budget: $11,434,177 (2024)
- Director: Jesse Montero
- Employees: 104
- Website: www.ypl.org

The Yonkers Public Library in Yonkers, New York, currently consists of three branch libraries. The main branch is 'Riverfront Library', which overlooks the Hudson River and New Jersey Palisades. Riverfront Library is located in one of the former Otis Elevator factory buildings and is across the street from the Yonkers Metro-North Hudson line train station. The branch opened in September 2002, and has approximately 75,000 square feet of space. The other two branches of the Yonkers Public Library are the Grinton I. Will branch, and Crestwood.

The Yonkers Public Library is a founding member and the largest member of the Westchester Library System (WLS), a consortium of 38 libraries serving the residents of Westchester County, New York. The Yonkers Public Library operates with a budget of over $11 million, 104 staff members, and a collection of over 420,000 books and other materials. The Director of the Library is Jesse Montero and the President of the Board of Trustees is Nancy Maron.

== History ==
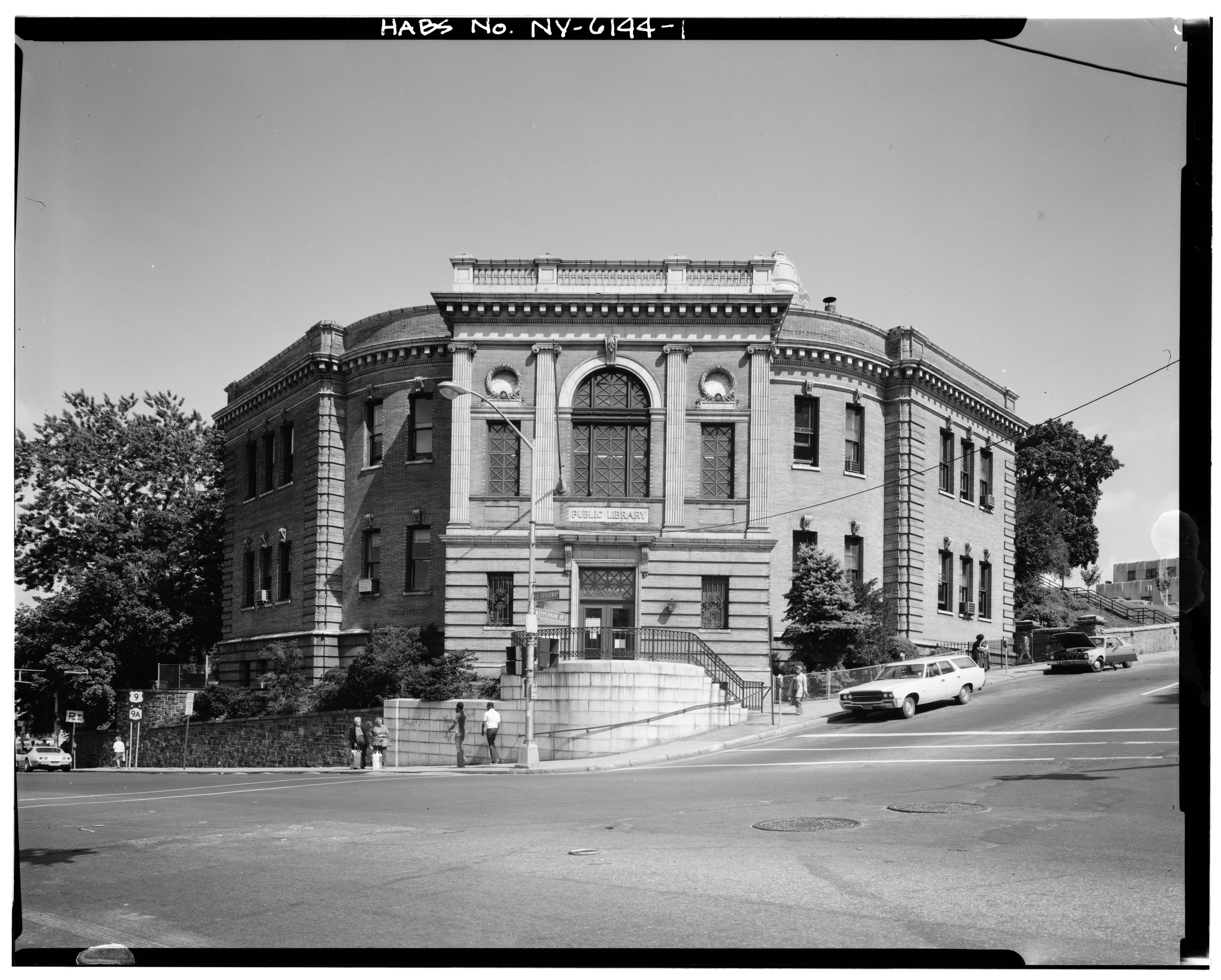
Carnegie library, later demolished

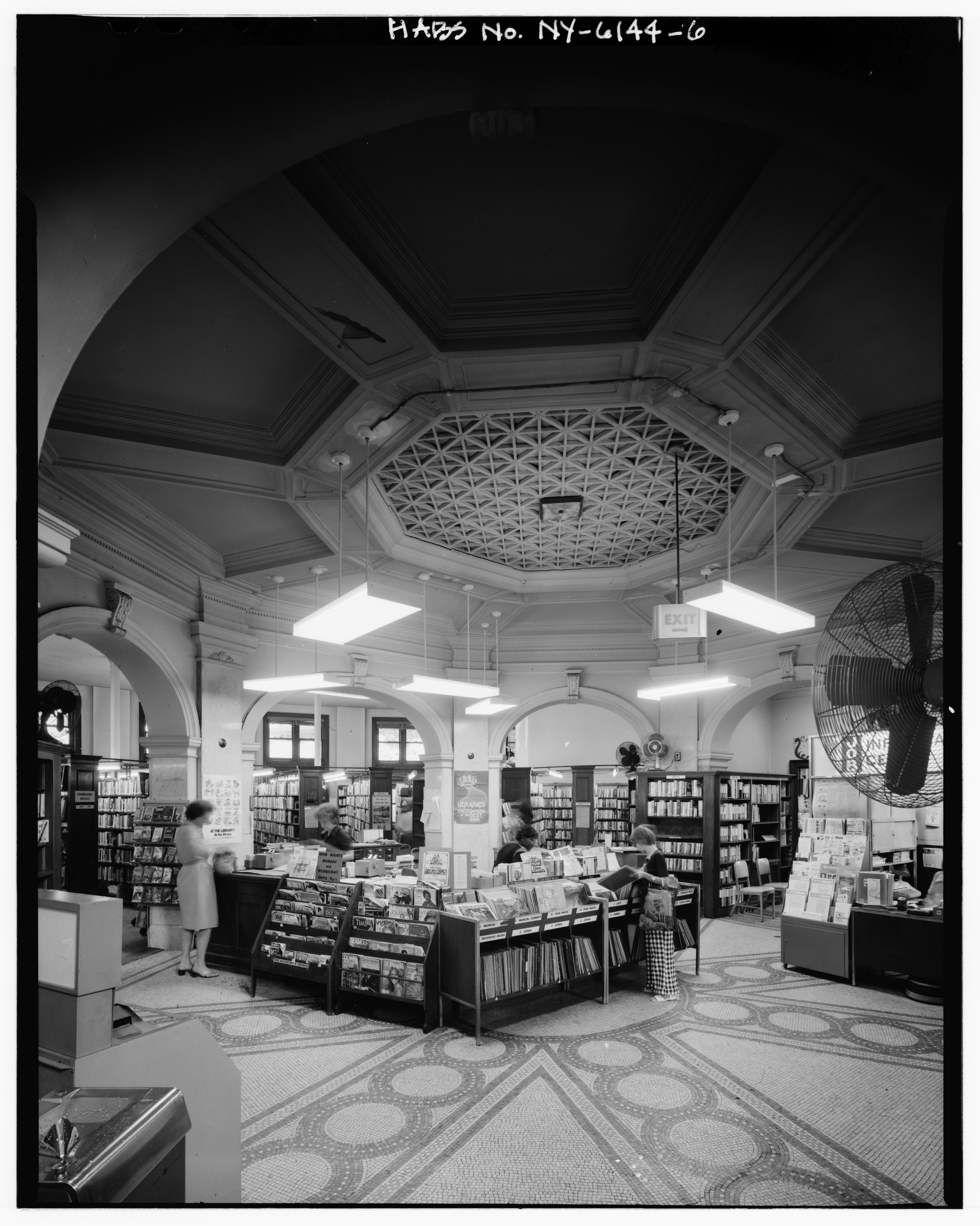
First floor of Carnegie library

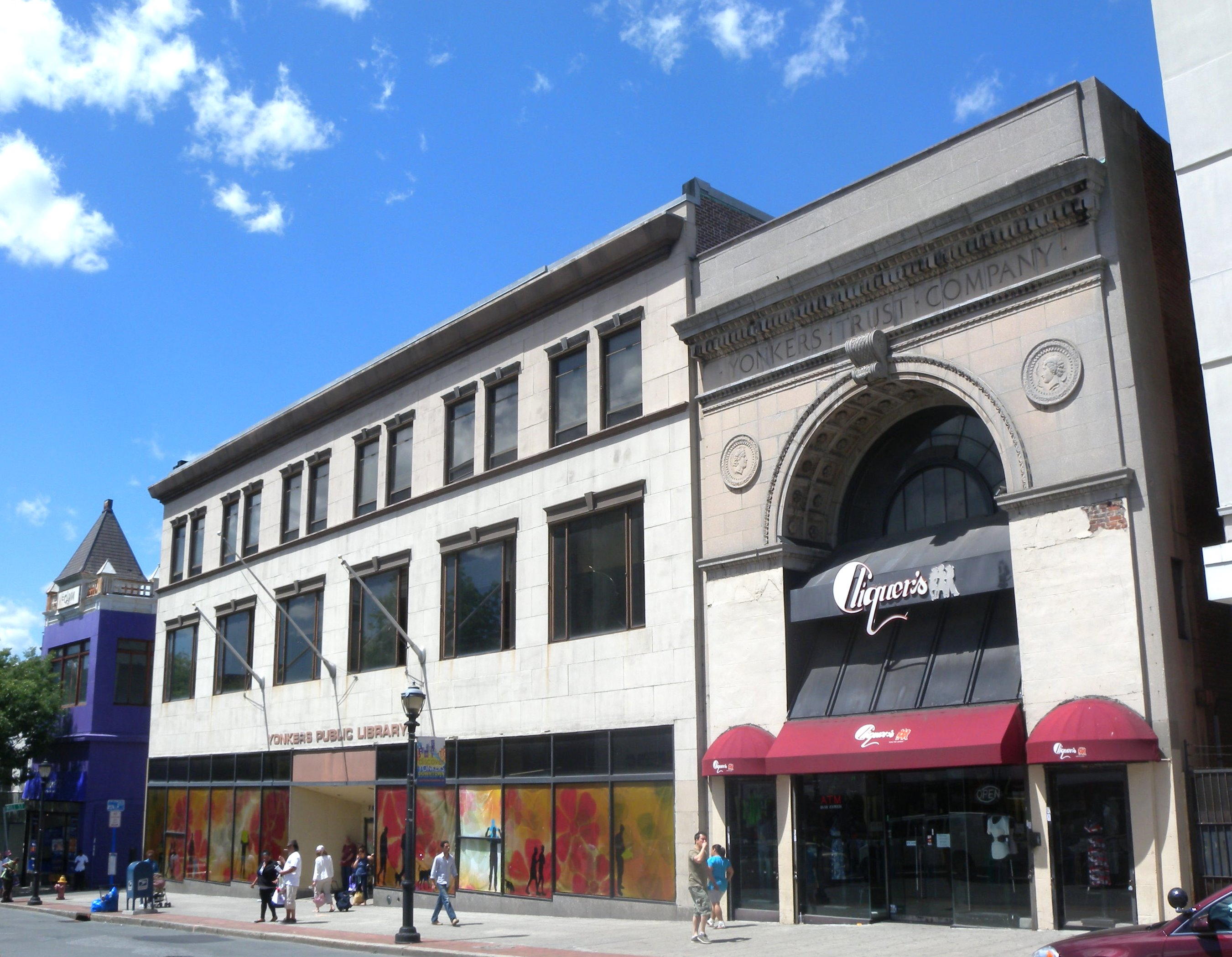
Main Street, Getty Square

The Yonkers Public Library was chartered by the state of New York on February 9, 1893. Having been formed in 1883 by the consolidation of five public school libraries, the Library called various sites home between the years 1883 and 1904. Yonkers Mayor Leslie Sutherland, joined by writer John Kendrick Bangs and educator Charles E. Gorton, formed a committee in 1900 to request funds from Andrew Carnegie for the construction of a permanent library building. 17,000 volumes of books were kept in the Nisbet Mansion in Washington Park until the building was completed.

Carnegie responded in March 1901, with a donation of $50,000, asking only that the City of Yonkers provide a suitable site for the library building and that it agree to expend $5,000 annually on the building's maintenance. Several sites for the new library were proposed by members of the Yonkers Board of Aldermen, including the site in the southwest corner of Washington Park that was eventually selected. Designed by local architects Edwin A. Quick & Son, and constructed by the local firm of Lynch and Larkin, Mr. Carnegie's library building opened to the public on the corner of South Broadway and Nepperhan Terrace on July 9, 1904. Support for this newly built library came from Ervin Saunders. Saunders, an executive of a machinery manufacture at Saunders & Sons, Incorporated, bequeathed $50,000 to the Yonkers Public Library before his death in 1909. There was a stipulation that all of the money had to be spent on the purchasing of nonfiction books.

With the opening, in the 1920s, of two branch libraries—one in the Armour Villa Park neighborhood and the other in the Crestwood neighborhood—the Carnegie library became the main branch of the Yonkers Public Library. Bookmobile service to outlying areas of Yonkers began in 1930. (The Yonkers Public Library Bookmobile is currently out of service.)

The Crestwood Library was originally located at a room in the P.S. 15 school in Yonkers. It was established through funding by the Crestwood Library Association and it opened on July 8, 1923. There was a total of 1,100 book on its shelves at this location. The library was registered with New York State on May 5, 1923. The Crestwood Library needed a new location after being told by the administration at P.S. 15 that the library space was needed for a classroom. Property was found at a location on Thompson Street in Yonkers to build the Crestwood Library. Construction for the library began on December 22, 1925, and was completed on October 16, 1926. The library finally had a permanent home. With the opening of the library, the Crestwood Library came under the direction of the city Yonkers. The Crestwood Library officially joined the Yonkers Public Library on October 18, 1928.

On November 11, 1962, the Sprain Brook branch of the Library opened on Central Park Avenue in east Yonkers. In honor of the Library's longtime director, the Sprain Brook branch was renamed the Grinton I. Will branch in 1973.

The Yonkers Public Library operated four branch libraries though Armour Villa Park closed (as superfluous) at about the same time that the Sprain Brook/Grinton I. Will branch opened, the Crestwood branch has always continued to operate. And Sprain Brook and Crestwood were joined for a time by branch libraries in Coyne Park and in the Hudson River Museum (both now closed).

The Carnegie library building served the Yonkers public for almost 80 years. Doomed by the decision to expand Nepperhan Avenue into an arterial, the building was closed and eventually demolished in May 1982, to the dismay of many. (Photos of the old Carnegie Library are available for viewing through the Library of Congress, from the American Memory Project). Having been evicted from its old home, the main branch of the Library took up quarters in the former Genung's Department Store at 7 Main Street in Getty Square. Opening there in May 1981, the main branch remained there for over 20 years. Its current home, since September 2002, is 1 Larkin Center. Now encompassing four floors, the spacious Riverfront Library shares the former, and thoroughly retooled, Otis Elevator Works building with the headquarters of the Yonkers Board of Education.
