= Mamaroneck Public Library =

Public library in Mamaroneck, New York, USA

- 40.9496°N 73.7342°W
- Location: 136 Prospect Avenue, Mamaroneck, New York 10543
- Established: 1923
- Branches: 1

Collection
- Size: 120,000+ volumes

Access and use
- Population served: 18,000 + residents

Other information
- Director: Patricia Byrne
- Employees: 35
- Website: http://www.mamaronecklibrary.org

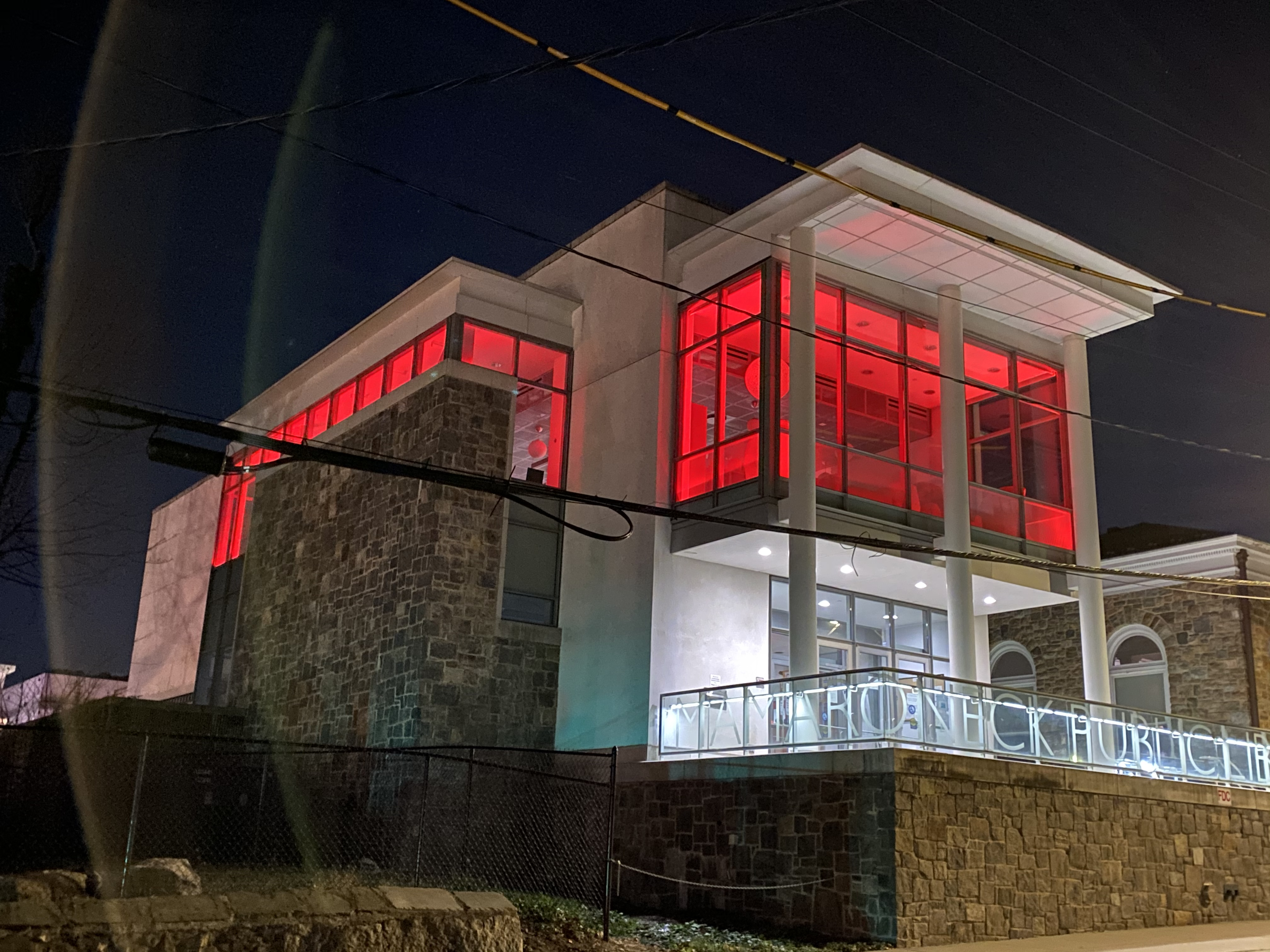
Mamaroneck Public Library

Mamaroneck Public Library is a public library located at 136 Prospect Avenue in Mamaroneck, New York.

== History ==
The Mamaroneck Public Library was established in 1923 on the Boston Post Road. It remained there until 1927, when it was moved to a new building at 136 Prospect Avenue.

== Today ==
The library serves over 18,000 people in the Village of Mamaroneck, New York. It is one of 38 public libraries in the Westchester Library System, in Westchester County. The collection is composed of over 120,000 books and audiovisual materials. Approximately 240,000 items are checked out of the library each year, at a rate of nearly 100 items per hour. The library offers more than 2,100 programs a year.

In 2021 Mamaroneck Public Library adopted a new Strategic Plan which envisions the Mamaroneck Public Library at the heart of the community, promoting community engagement, and connecting people with ideas and each other in order to make Mamaroneck a better place to live.

In 2022 Mamaroneck Public Library was named Best Library in Westchester County by Westchester Magazine.
