= Westchester Library System =

Library system in New York state, U.S.

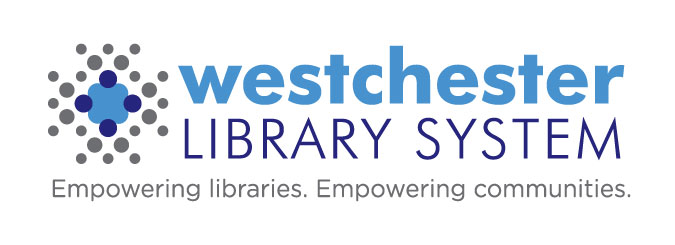

Westchester Library System (WLS) is the library system for the residents of Westchester County, New York. It was established in 1958. The system has 38 public libraries across the county and its headquarters are located in the town of Greenburgh, near Elmsford.

== About ==
The Westchester Library System is a state-chartered, cooperative library system serving all 38 Westchester member public libraries and the county's citizens. It is one of the 23 public library systems serving New York State's public libraries, and was established in 1958.

The mission of the Westchester Library System is to enhance and improve the county's libraries, and to ensure that all residents have excellent library service regardless of their location.

A 15-member board of trustees, elected by the trustees of the member libraries, is the governing body of the system.

== Member libraries ==
Library	Image	Location	Type	Collection (2016)	Historical notes
Ardsley Public Library		Ardsley	Public Village	49,224	
North Castle Public Library (Armonk Branch)		North Castle	Public Town	71,026	
North Castle Public Library (North White Plains Branch)		North Castle	N/A	N/A	
Bedford Free Library		Bedford	Association Other	44,886	
Bedford Hills Free Library		Bedford Hills	Association Other	41,397	
Briarcliff Manor Public Library		Briarcliff Manor	Public Village	32,724	Former train station
Bronxville Public Library		Bronxville	Public Village	64,805	
Chappaqua Library		Chappaqua	Public School District	126,864	
Croton Free Library		Croton	Association Other	79,650	
Dobbs Ferry Public Library		Dobbs Ferry	Public Village	41,244	
Eastchester Public Library		Eastchester	Public Town	86,375	
Greenburgh Public Library		Greenburgh	Public Special Legislative District	123,650	
Harrison Public Library		Harrison	Public Town	124,515	
Harrison Public Library (West Harrison Branch)		Harrison	N/A	N/A	
Hastings-on-Hudson Public Library		Hastings-on-Hudson	Public Village	53,097	
Irvington Public Library		Irvington	Public Village	62,682	
Katonah Village Library		Katonah	Association Other	61,633	
Larchmont Public Library		Larchmont	Public Village	96,629	
Mamaroneck Public Library		Mamaroneck	Public Special Legislative District	82,259	
Hendrick Hudson Free Library		Montrose	Association School District	64,234	
Mount Kisco Public Library		Mount Kisco	Public Village	69,456	
Mount Pleasant Public Library		Pleasantville	Public Town	97,462	
Mount Pleasant Public Library (Branch library)		Valhalla	N/A	N/A	
Mount Vernon Public Library		Mount Vernon	Public School District	624,755	
New Rochelle Public Library		New Rochelle	Public School District	247,165	
New Rochelle Public Library (Huguenot Children’s Library)		New Rochelle	N/A	N/A	
Ruth Keeler Memorial Library		North Salem	Association Town	37,894	
Ossining Public Library		Ossining	Public School District	117,987	
The Field Library		Peekskill	Association City	99,556	
Town of Pelham Public Library		Pelham	Public Town	37,778	
Port Chester-Rye Brook Public Library		Port Chester	Association Other	74,179	
Pound Ridge Library (Hiram Halle Memorial Library)		Pound Ridge	Public Special Legislative District	55,804	
Purchase Free Library		Purchase	Association Other	7,776	
Rye Free Reading Room		Rye	Association City	73,240	
Rye Free Reading Room (Osborn Branch Library)		Rye	N/A	N/A	
Scarsdale Public Library		Scarsdale	Public Village	119,609	
John C. Hart Memorial Library		Shrub Oak (Yorktown)	Public Town	101,975	
Somers Library		Somers	Public Town	94,475	
Lewisboro Library		South Salem	Association Town	45,561	
Warner Library		Tarrytown	Public Village	83,665	
Tuckahoe Public Library		Tuckahoe	Public Village	45,945	
White Plains Public Library		White Plains	Public City	284,356	
Yonkers Public Library (Riverfront branch)		Yonkers	Public City	335,377	
Yonkers Public Library (Grinton I. Will branch)		Yonkers	N/A	N/A	
Yonkers Public Library (Crestwood branch)		Yonkers	N/A	N/A	

== Services ==
=== Cataloging and processing ===
Books, videos, recordings, and other library materials acquired by member libraries are cataloged and entered in the online "card catalog" and are made available to all cardholders.

=== Information technology ===
The system staff operates the circulation system and maintains the network, providing access to collections, various databases, and the Internet.

=== Delivery ===
A delivery service provides transportation of Library materials to each member library.

=== InterLibrary loan ===
InterLibrary loan service enables patrons to borrow materials which are not owned by any WLS library.

=== Outreach services ===
The WLS outreach services seek to improve access to public library services for all residents of Westchester County. Outreach activities focus on developing programs and partnerships that expand the capacity of libraries to serve the needs of low-income seniors and adults seeking information on social services, education and jobs. This work includes those who have been incarcerated, those who are institutionalized, and those with disabilities. Direct services: support for those seeking a high school equivalency diploma and older adults seeking guidance on Medicare and related benefits.

==== WEBS - Career & Educational Counseling Service ====
WEBS offers free group and individual career counseling programs in libraries for adults in career transition as well as access to career and educational information.

=== Youth services ===
WLS coordinates programs that support the ongoing training and collaboration of librarians serving youth in Westchester County.

=== External relations ===
Develops and maintains contact with community organizations, press and media. Raises funds and visibility for member libraries and system initiatives.

=== Continuing education and consulting services ===
WLS arranges and conducts workshops and other training opportunities for professional development of member librarians and the advancement of Library trustees. Professional advice is available to member Libraries on services, programs, planning, budgeting, administration, and management.
