= Science Barge =

Science museum in Yonkers, New York, U.S.

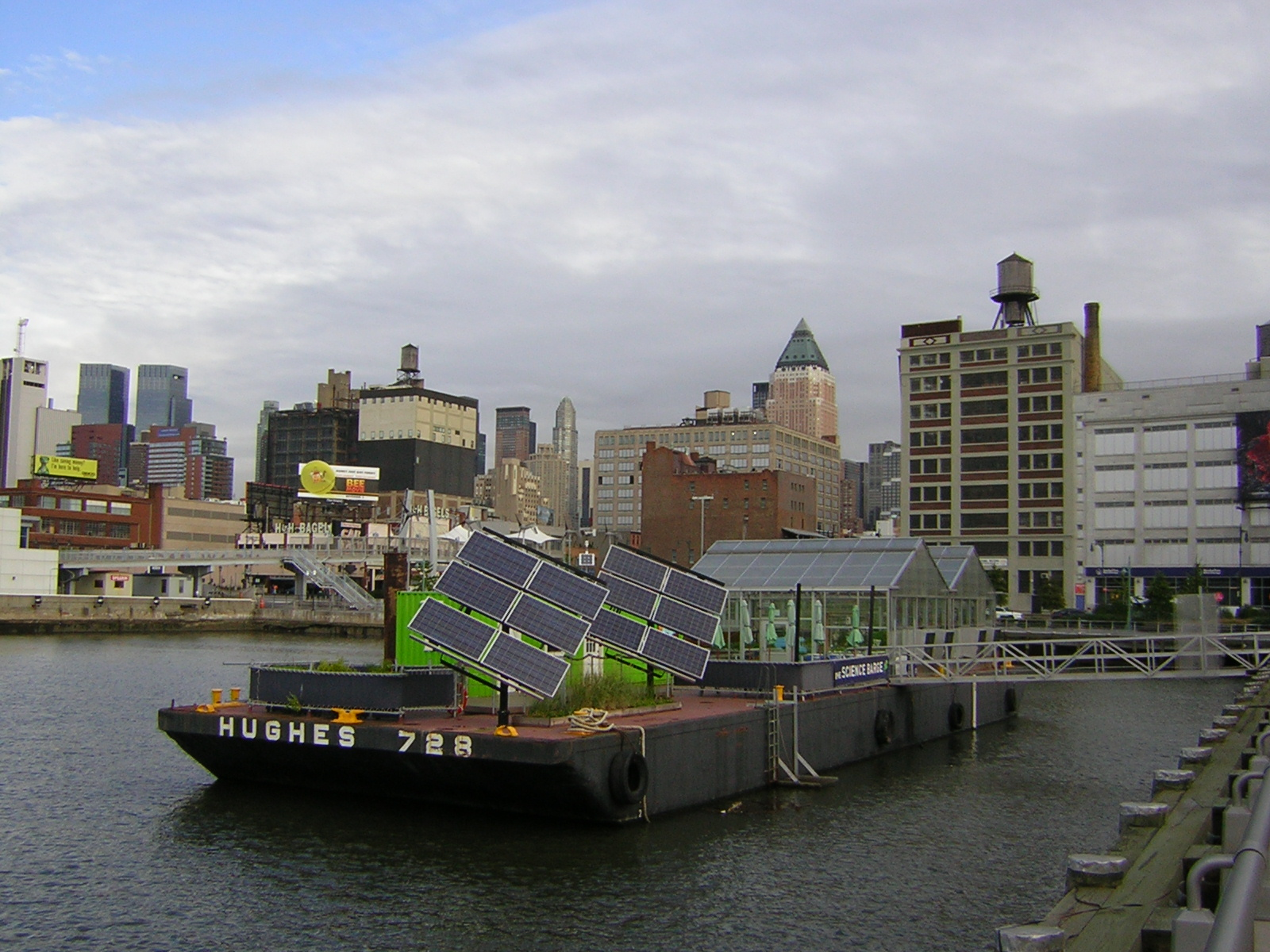
Docked at North River Pier 84 in 2007

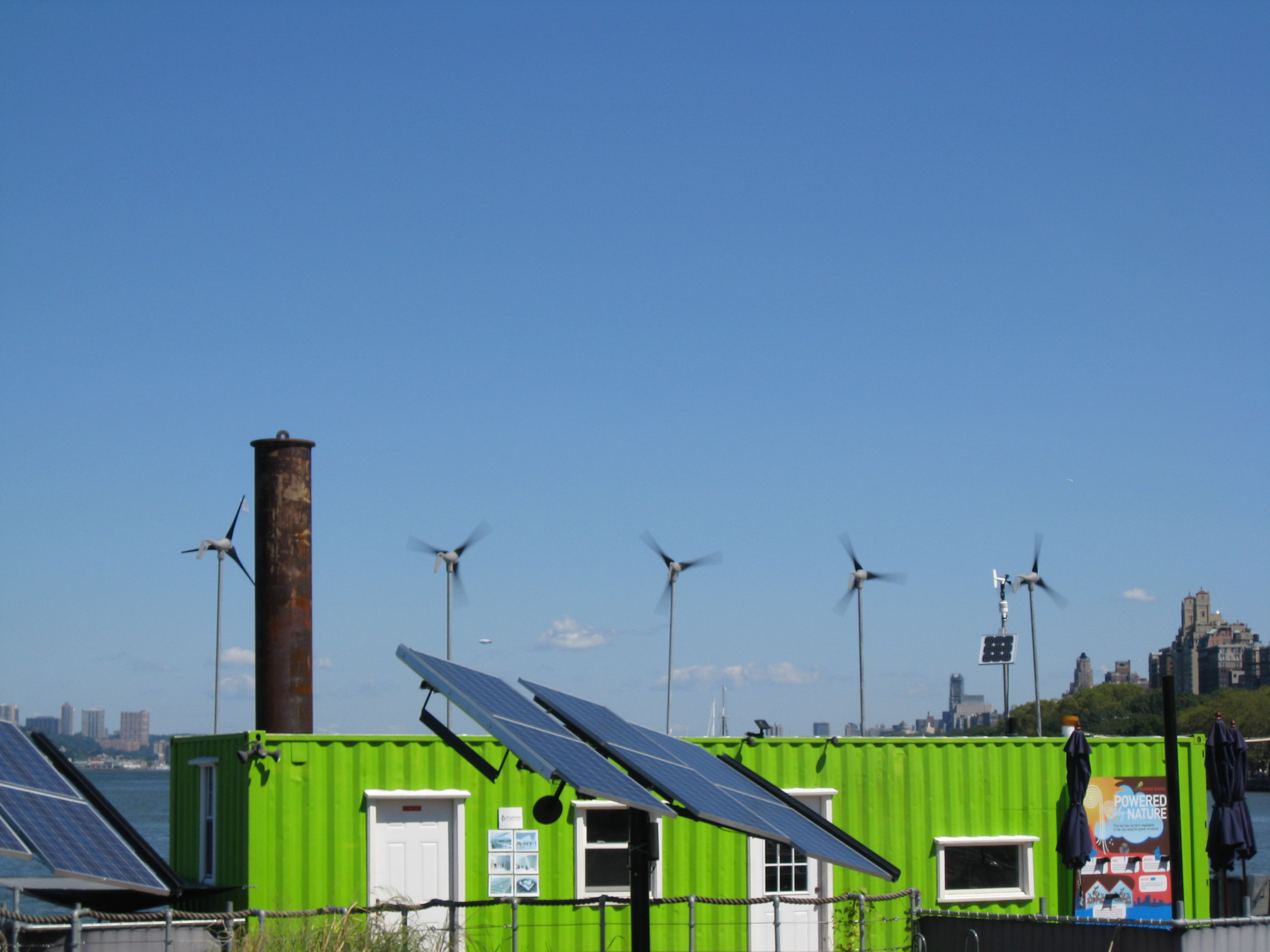
Closer view of the wind turbines in 2008

The Science Barge is a floating urban farm and environmental education center that has been docked in Yonkers, New York, United States, since late 2008.

The barge grows crops using a hydroponic greenhouse powered by solar panels, wind turbines, and biofuels. The crops in the greenhouse are irrigated by captured rainwater and desalinated river water. Food is grown without carbon emissions, no agricultural waste is discharged into the watershed and no pesticides are used.

The Science Barge is also a public education tool and hosts school groups from Westchester County, as well as New York City, and the greater New York area visiting during the week, and the general public on weekends.

From 2006 to 2008, the barge docked for periods of two months at each of six stops along the Manhattan waterfront with the goal of educating the public on urban sustainable agriculture.

== Early history in Manhattan ==
The Science Barge was conceived and designed by Ted Caplow and built by New York Sun Works, a non-profit organization that developed the project in order to educate students and teachers about the science of sustainability through hydroponic farming.

The exhibits and ecological experiments that comprise the Science Barge float on a steel-deck barge, approximately 115 feet long, constructed in the 1940s and used for cargo and utility work in New York Harbor until leased by New York Sun Works from Hughes Marine in 2006. The Science Barge urban-farm systems were built on the barge in Red Hook, Brooklyn, in the summer of 2006, and deployed briefly to pier 92 before opening to the public at pier 84 on May 4, 2007, adjacent to the Circle Line Sightseeing Cruises; and the Intrepid Sea-Air-Space Museum. Over the next two years, the barge also made several visits to pier I in Riverside Park South as well as the Chelsea Piers complex in lower Manhattan.

== Move to Yonkers ==
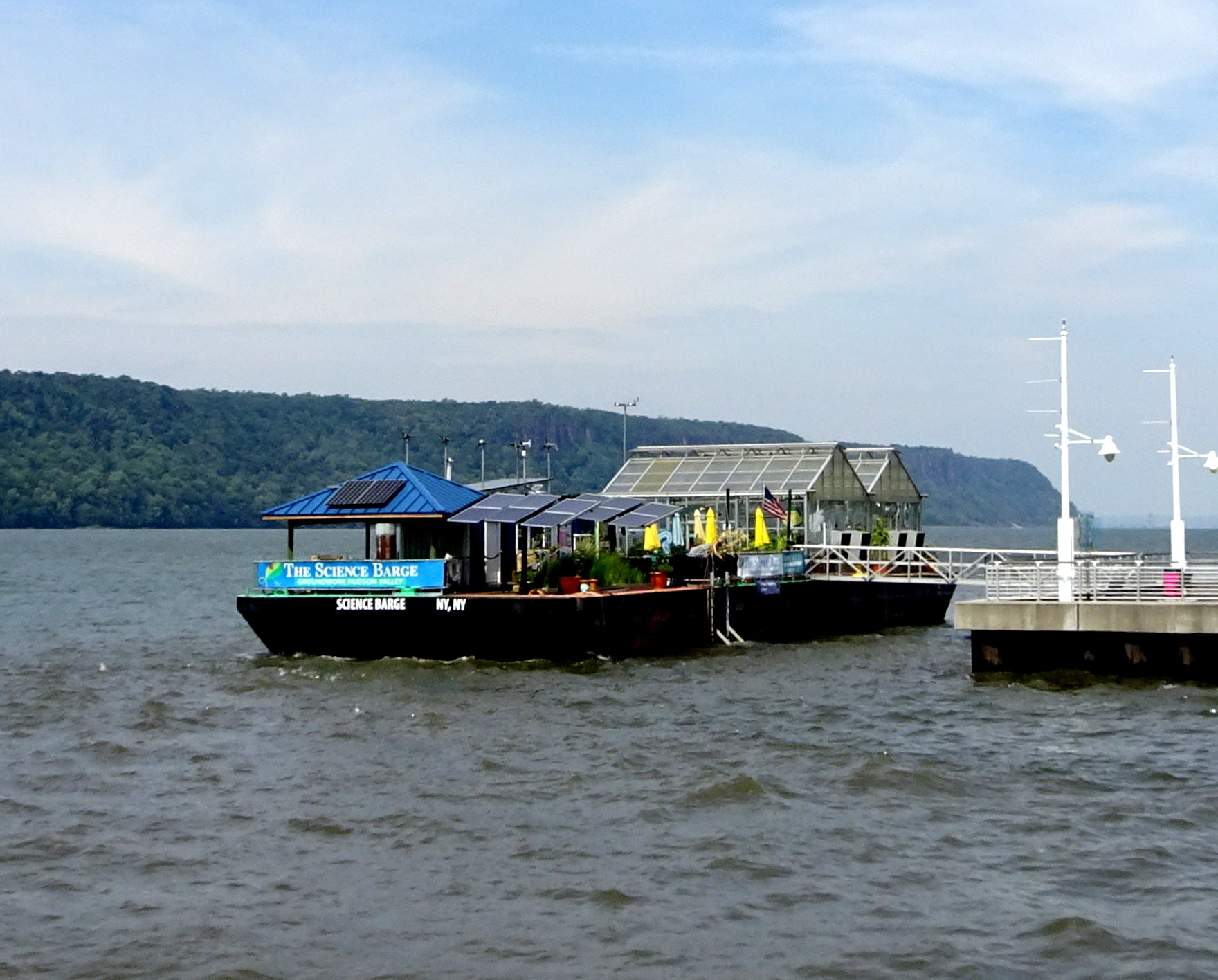
Docked at Yonkers in 2016

After touring for two years, New York Sun Works sought a permanent home for the barge and decided to sell the Science Barge to Groundwork Hudson Valley in Yonkers in October 2008 for $2.00. Groundwork Hudson Valley is a non-profit organization focused on environmental justice in distressed communities in the lower Hudson Valley. In November 2008, the barge docked at 99 Dock Street, at the mouth of the Saw Mill River.

The barge has helped attract visitors to the downtown Yonkers area especially due to its accessibility by mass transit. The placement by the Saw Mill River called attention to a daylighting project providing amenities in Getty Square and promoting the revitalization of downtown Yonkers.

Groundwork Hudson Valley uses the Science Barge to provide a research, training, and development platform for its Yonkers-based food programs including the Get Fresh Yonkers Food Co-op, farmers' market, and community-supported agriculture (CSA).

== Technical details ==
The greenhouse on the barge is approximately 1,200 ft2, purchased new from Nexus, Inc and constructed in place on the barge. The structure is aluminum and secured to the barge deck via bolts and custom-made welded-steel brackets. The walls of the greenhouse are glass and the roof is a rigid, doubled-walled polycarbonate plastic. Ventilation is achieved via four mechanical fans, a pad wall evaporative cooling system, and a large, automatically controlled atrium roof vent to maximize passive ventilation. Rainwater is harvested from the greenhouse roof and stored in tanks with a 1,200-gallon aggregate capacity before being used to irrigate hydroponic crops in a broad and constantly evolving variety of different growing systems and media.

The barge has also hosted a number of aquaponic and marine-science experiments, including cultivation of tilapia, catfish, crayfish, clams, and oysters, among others.

The energy systems on the barge, in their original configuration, included 2.5 KW of solar capacity mounted on passive trackers, 2 kW of micro wind turbines, a 4 kW biodiesel backup generator, a large lead-acid battery bank providing 1,000 amp-hours at 48 volts, and associated support hardware. The barge also deployed a semi-custom reverse-osmosis system to desalinate water from the Hudson River for backup use.

== Response ==
The public launch of the Science Barge in New York City on May 4, 2007, was attended by dignitary speakers, including New York City Parks Commissioner Adrian Benepe, New York State Senator Thomas Duane, ecological design pioneer John Todd, who in his public remarks called the Science Barge "a crucible for visualizing the city of the future" and United Nations senior adviser Jeffrey Sachs who said that "The Science Barge is not only an invitation to ideas and learning, but to change."

In March 2009, the barge was named "Best Class Trip" by New York magazine in its annual "Best Of..." issue. In July 2009, GOOD created a short video of the purpose and methods of the Barge. In the same month, former CBS News anchor Dan Rather hosted an episode of "Dan Rather Reports" on the barge. A hydroponic greenhouse, inspired by the Science Barge, opened in 2010 on the roof of the Manhattan School for Children.

The Science Barge has been covered by The New York Times, ABC World News, Voice of America, Science, and The Economist, among others. A double-page photograph of the Science Barge appeared in National Geographic magazine in March 2009 as part of an issue dedicated to energy efficiency.

Interest in the barge has continued as awareness and public interest in sustainable food production methods and building-integrated agriculture has grown. During an August 2014 visit to the Science Barge, Westchester County Legislator Catherine Parker said “"I think really that the county government is making such a mandate of doing this. I'm hoping that residents will also see that this is the way that they can do their part too."

== Miami barge ==
In 2015, Nathalie Manzano-Smith and Caplow won the Knight Cities Challenge grant competition from the John S. and James L. Knight Foundation with a proposal to build a Miami Science Barge and moor it in Museum Park in downtown Miami, Florida. The Miami Science Barge opened on Earth Day, April 22, 2016. The following April, the barge was given to the Phillip and Patricia Frost Museum of Science. Compared with the original Science Barge, the Miami Science Barge places more emphasis on marine science, conservation, and sustainable aquaculture, while also updating many of the urban agricultural systems featured on the original.

== Sources ==
- Official Website
- Columbia University's Teachers College Video on education on the Barge
- NY Times story and slideshow
- Article in New York Observer
- New York Sun Works, creators of The Science Barge
- Groundwork Hudson Valley Science Barge FAQ
- TripHoney Tourism for Teens Video on the Science Barge
- Earth Institute of Columbia University article on the Science Barge
