= Museum Park (Miami) =

Park in Miami, United States

Maurice A. Ferré Park
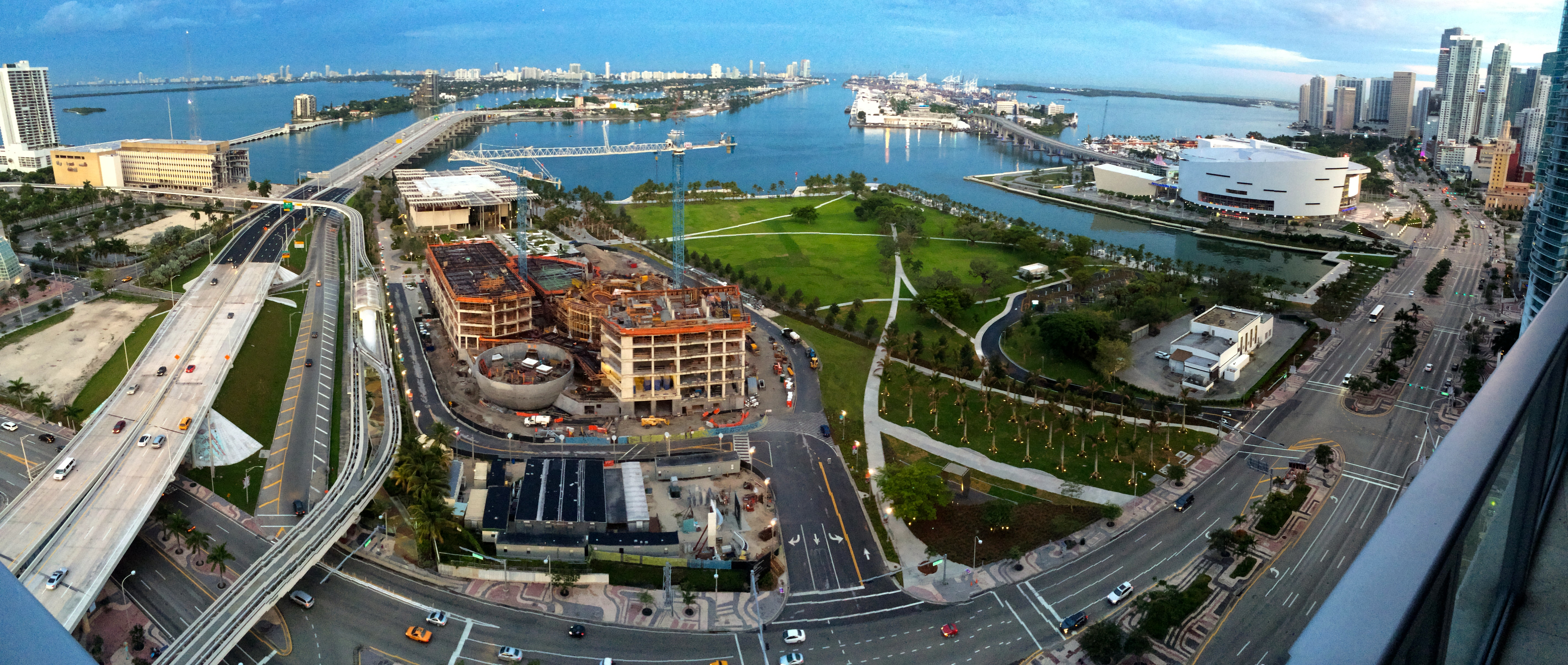
- Museum Park as seen from the Marquis Miami in June 2014
- Interactive map of Maurice A. Ferré Park
- Type: Municipal
- Location: Downtown, Miami, Florida, U.S.
- Coordinates: 25.784°N 80.187°W
- Area: 30 acres (12 ha)
- Created: 1976
- Operator: Bayfront Park Management Trust
- Public transit: Museum Park (Metromover station)

Maurice A. Ferré Park (formerly Museum Park) is a 30-acre (12 ha) public, urban park in downtown Miami, Florida. The park opened in 1976 on the site of several slips served by the Seaboard Air Line Railroad. It was originally named "Bicentennial Park" to celebrate the bicentennial of the United States in that same year. Today, the park is maintained by the Bayfront Park Management Trust. The park is bordered on the north by I-395, Metromover, and the former Miami Herald headquarters, on the south by the American Airlines Arena and Bayside Marketplace, on the west by Biscayne Boulevard and on the east by Biscayne Bay.

== The park ==
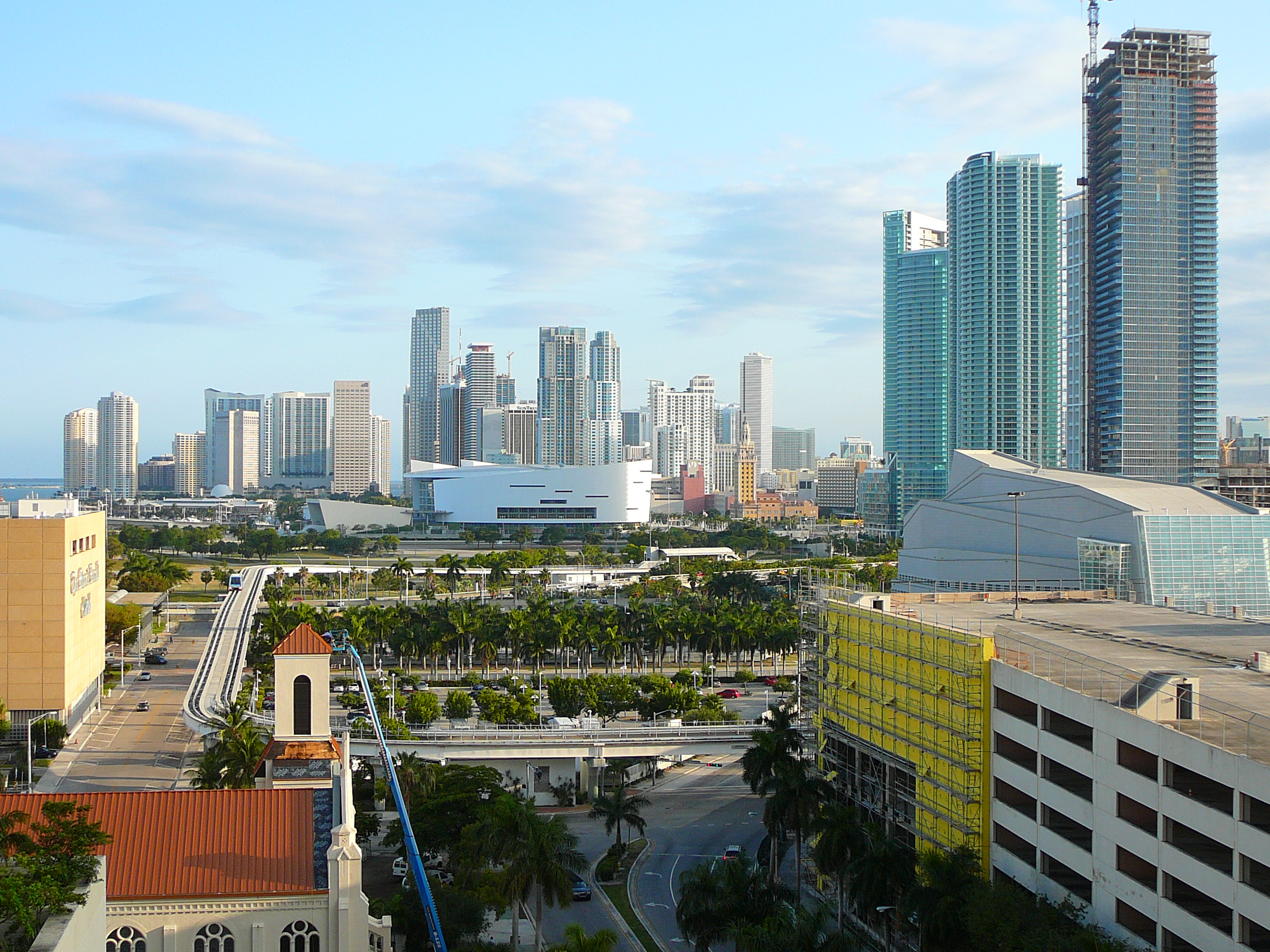
Western corner of Museum Park seen from The Grand Doubletree in April 2008

The park is served by the Metrorail at Government Center Station and directly by the Metromover's Museum Park Station, Eleventh Street Station and Park West Station.

Museum Park is host to many large-scale events as the park can hold around 45,000 people. Some of these events include Ultra Music Festival, a large, three-day music event, numerous rock concerts such as Warped Tour, various conventions, concerts, as well as boat tours around Biscayne Bay. In March 2009, Museum Park was set to host the Langerado Music Festival, a large three-day festival that was held at the Big Cypress Seminole Indian Reservation every Spring since 2003, but was canceled due to poor ticket sales.

Seven blocks south is Museum Park's partner park, the 32-acre (0.13 km^{2}) Bayfront Park.

Museum Park underwent a renovation for the Pérez Art Museum Miami and construction of the new Phillip and Patricia Frost Museum of Science. The $10 million revamp included a new bay walk and a promenade from Biscayne Boulevard to Biscayne Bay that provides pedestrian access to the museums. as it is currently underutilized for large parts of the year. Pérez Art Museum Miami opened in December 2013 and the Frost Museum of Science opened its doors in May 2017. The Dogs and Cats Walkway and Sculpture Gardens opened officially in January 2023.

The Miami Science Barge is a floating marine laboratory and education platform docked in the park. It was opened in 2016 and focuses on three areas, sustainability, alternative agriculture and marine ecology and conservation.

== History ==
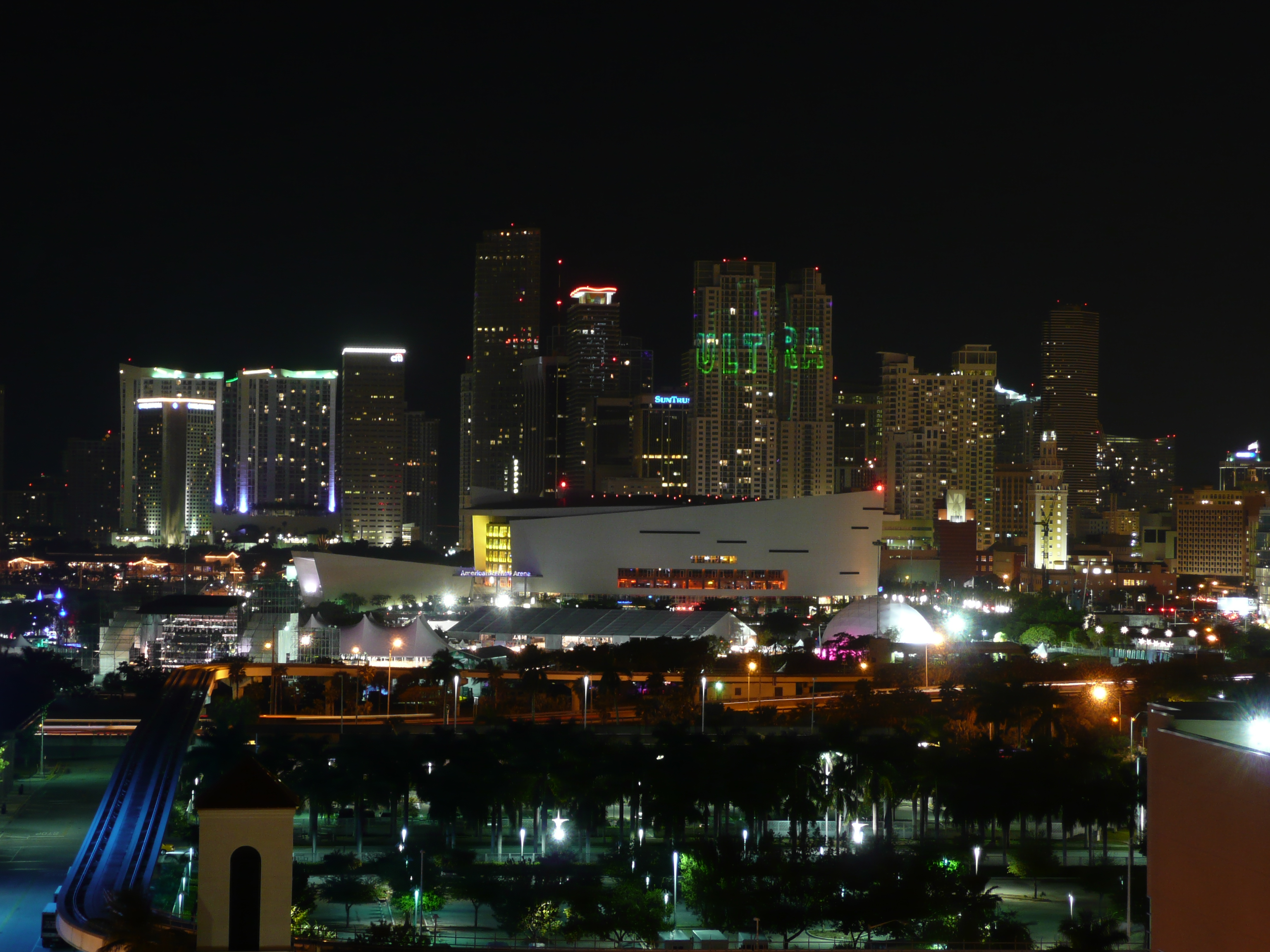
Museum Park during Ultra Music Festival and Earth Hour in March 2010

From the early 1900s to the mid-1960s, the park had been the location of the Port of Miami, until the port was eventually moved to neighboring Dodge Island in the mid-1960s. Once the port moved out to Dodge Island, the land was cleaned up of industrial residue from decades of port trade, and the park was designed, finally opening up in 1976, as Downtown's second large park after Bayfront Park.

In May 1994, the Omni Loop of the Metromover opened, which brought a Metromover station to the park. In 1996, the station was closed due to lack of use. In 2013, the station was renovated by CNC Management Group and reopened as Museum Park Station to provide direct access to the art and science museums.

In early 2019, the park was renamed Maurice A. Ferré Park in honor of former Miami Mayor Maurice Ferré.

=== Auto racing ===
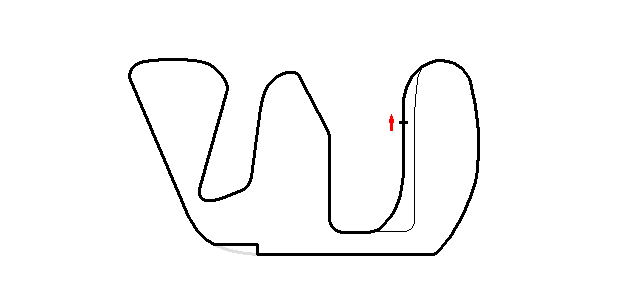
Track layout of the street circuit used by CART in 1995

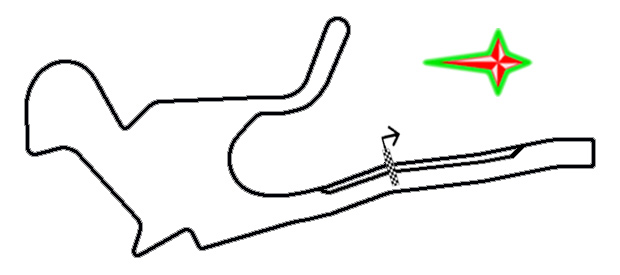
Track layout of the street circuit used by IMSA GT in 1983–1985

Racing events were held on a temporary circuit at Bicentennial Park from 1983 to 1995 involving IMSA, Trans-Am Series, and CART, and again for FIA Formula E in 2015.

=== Lap records ===
The fastest official race lap records at Bicentennial Park (Miami) are listed as:

Category	Time	Driver	Vehicle	Event
Formula E Circuit (2015): 1.348 mi (2.170 km)
Formula E	1:07.969	Nelson Piquet Jr.	Spark-Renault SRT_01E	2015 Miami ePrix
Grand Prix Circuit with Chicane (1995): 1.873 mi (3.014 km)
CART	1:05.982	Scott Pruett	Lola T95/00	1995 Marlboro Grand Prix of Miami
Formula Atlantic	1:10.895	Bill Auberlen	Ralt RT-41	1995 Miami Atlantic Championship round
Indy Lights	1:11.032	Greg Moore	Lola T93/20	1995 Miami Indy Lights round
Grand Prix Circuit (1986–1994): 1.873 mi (3.014 km)
IMSA GTP	1:06.412	P. J. Jones	Eagle MkIII	1993 Toyota Grand Prix of Miami
IMSA GTP Lights	1:14.578	Parker Johnstone	Spice SE90P	1993 Toyota Grand Prix of Miami
IMSA GTS	1:16.680	Paul Gentilozzi	Oldsmobile Cutlass	1993 Toyota Grand Prix of Miami
Trans-Am	1:17.806	Dorsey Schroeder	Ford Mustang Cobra Trans-Am	1994 Miami Trans-Am round
IMSA GTO	1:20.039	Pete Halsmer	Mazda RX-7	1990 Nissan Grand Prix of Miami
IMSA GTU	1:22.434	David Loring	Nissan 240SX	1990 Nissan Grand Prix of Miami
IMSA Supercar Championship	1:29.885	Doc Bundy	Lotus Esprit X180R	1993 Miami IMSA Supercar round
IMSA AC	1:31.139	Carson Hurley	Buick Skylark	1989 Nissan Grand Prix of Miami
Grand Prix Circuit (1983–1985): 1.850 mi (2.977 km)
IMSA GTP	1:23.987	David Hobbs	March 83G	1985 Löwenbräu Grand Prix of Miami
IMSA GTO	1:29.993	Willy T. Ribbs	Ford Mustang	1985 Löwenbräu Grand Prix of Miami
IMSA GTU	1:30.256	Clay Young	Pontiac Fiero	1985 Löwenbräu Grand Prix of Miami
IMSA GTP Lights	1:32.514	Kelly Marsh	Argo JM16	1985 Löwenbräu Grand Prix of Miami
