= Miami Science Barge =

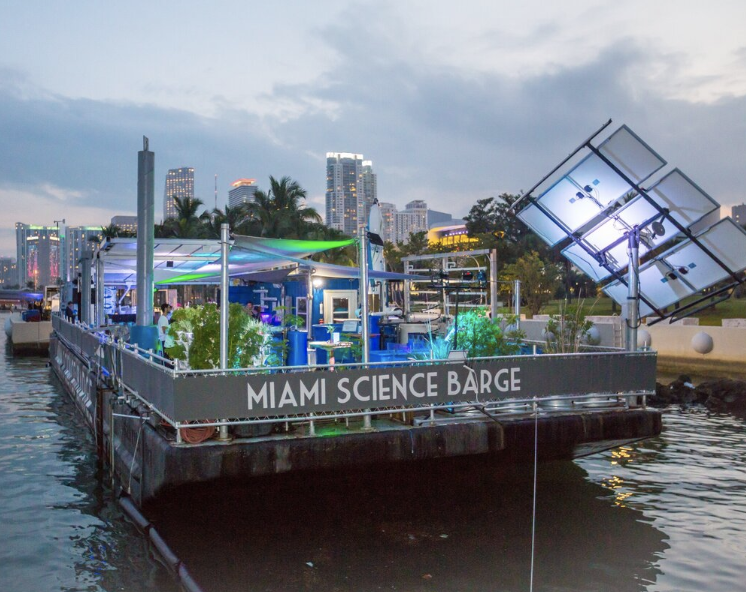
Docked at Museum Park

The Miami Science Barge (also known as the Science Barge) was a floating marine laboratory and education platform docked in Museum Park, Miami, FL since 2016. The Barge, designed to help support a more sustainable city, had three main areas of focus: marine ecology and conservation, sustainability, and alternative agriculture. It is completely off-grid and off-pipe and provided approximately enough energy and food production to support an average American family. In its first year, over 3000 students came aboard to learn about the innovative technology on the Barge. The vessel opened to the public on Saturdays. The Miami Science Barge was conceived by Nathalie Manzano and designed by Manzano and Ted Caplow. They were inspired by the Science Barge built in 2006 by New York Sun Works, designed by Caplow. The vessels were of similar size and both had a sustainable technology focus, but they responded to very different local environments and housed differing technology and unique public education programs. The Miami Science Barge emphasized aquaculture. The Miami Science Barge was donated in April 2017 to the brand-new Philip and Patricia Frost Museum of Science, who took over operations. The Miami Science Barge is no longer in use.

== Early history ==
In 2015, Nathalie Manzano and Ted Caplow of CappSci won the Knight Cities Challenge grant competition from the John S. and James L. Knight Foundation with a proposal to build the Miami Science Barge. The Barge was a 120x30 steel construction barge from Grady Marine retrofitted with 2nd-hand shipping containers in 2015. With the generosity of Beau Payne of P & L Towing, the staff of CappSci were able to design and build the power system and exhibits of the Barge on the Miami River prior to moving it to its official location in Museum Park in downtown Miami, FL. The Miami Science Barge opened on Earth Day, April 22, 2016. The following April, the Barge was gifted to Phillip and Patricia Frost Museum of Science.

== Technical details ==
The Miami Science Barge has three main areas of focus:

=== Sustainability ===
The Barge is fully off-grid. It utilizes 48 solar panels (donated by JinkoSolar) to generate enough power to run all of its systems. These panels are set into five arrays including a solar dance floor and a solar tracking system. Power is stored into two sets of batteries: lead-acid batteries, and experimental Aquion M-Line battery modules. The panels provide about 75kWh. It is also off-pipe, meaning that all of its fresh water comes from a rainwater catchment system located about the classroom area. The water is stored in a 900-gallon cistern. The salt water comes directly from Biscayne Bay. No discharge is released from the Barge. Waste water is collected in constructed wetland troughs where the water is filtered or in some cases may evaporate. Furthermore, the Barge aimed to utilize only sustainable material in construction, i.e. the Kebony deck throughout the farm area. Kebony is an eco-friendly alternative to tropical hardwoods, using a bio-based seal instead of a synthetic one. The staff on the Barge also follow strict habits of sustainability, including prohibiting single-use plastics from being used on board for events and by diligently cleaning debris found in the notch.

=== Alternative agriculture ===
On board are a variety of sustainable and unconventional agriculture systems including hydroponics, aeroponics, aquaculture, and aquaponics. Hydroponics and aeroponics are forms of growing produce that utilizes water and nutrients most efficiently. Aquaculture systems grow fish and other marine creature for consumption so as not to harm the balance in the ocean and aquaponics is a combination of aquaculture and aquaponics, where marine life produce waste which is consumed by plants. On board is also a vertically integrated greenhouse (patented by Caplow and Zak W. Adams).

=== Marine ecology and conservation ===
Along with the aquaponic and aquaculture tanks, there are multiple tanks showcasing marine life. Towards the entrance of the Barge, there is a coral tank, developed with the help of Dr. Diego Lirman at the University of Miami and Rescue a Reef. It is the only tank in South Florida representing what coral restoration in the wild looks like. Other exhibit tanks show sea life from Biscayne Bay, including sea horses, a giant hermit crab, erosion-preventing sea grasses, mangroves, and a myriad of local fish.

These tanks are used to educate about the importance of diversity in Miami’s local ecology. Guest scientists are invited most weekends and on the 3rd Wednesday of every month for Sip of Science to promote the conservation of the environment.

== Response ==
The Miami Science Barge opened on Earth Day, April 22, 2016 and was attended by dignitary speakers including City of Miami Commissioner Frank Carollo, who in his remarks called the Barge "a symbol of Miami's diversity not only in people, but in ideas, as well as, a symbol of our community's commitment to environmental education," Miami Dade County Public Schools Superintendent Alberto Carvalho, Knight Foundation’s Miami Program Director Matt Haggman, and Children Trust’s Founding Board Chair David Lawrence, Jr. In December 2016, Miami Science Barge was named one of “The Ten Best Things to Do in Downtown Miami” by Miami New Times
