= Fruit stand =

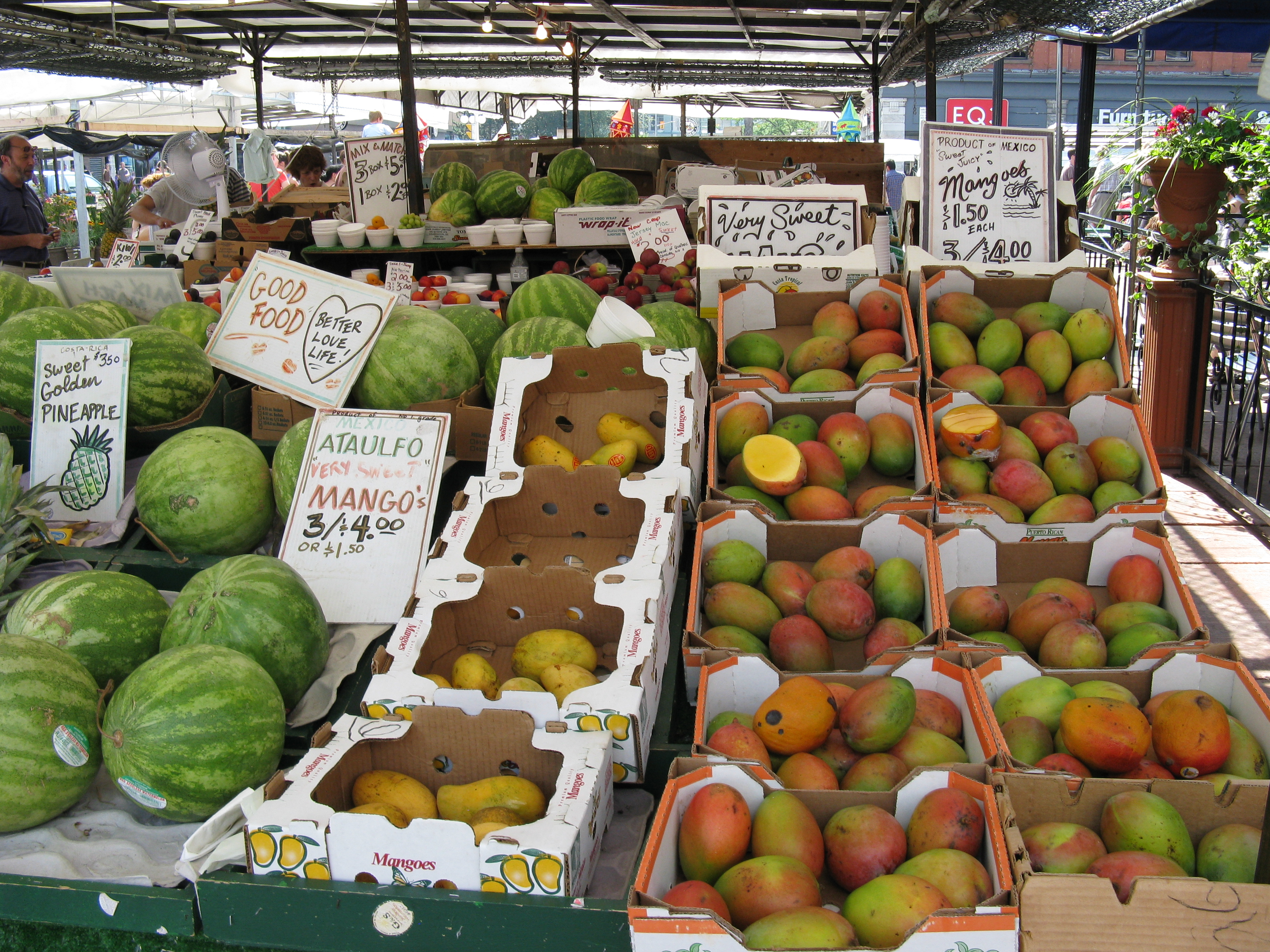
A fruit stand

Fruit stand in Tokyo, Japan

A fruit stand or fruit stall is a primarily open-air business venue that sells seasonal fruit and many fruit products from local growers. Many also sell vegetables and processed foods derived from fruit. Fruit stands can be anything from a few crates on a roadside to permanent buildings, and their stock usually follow local harvest cycles. The fruit stand is a small business structure that is primarily run as an independent sole proprietorship, with very few franchises or branches of larger fruit stand conglomerates, though many large food industry businesses have developed from fruit stand businesses. In North America, produce stands are a direct way for small farms to sell to customers. In much of the Global South, fruit stands are a major informal source of affordable, fresh produce.

== History ==
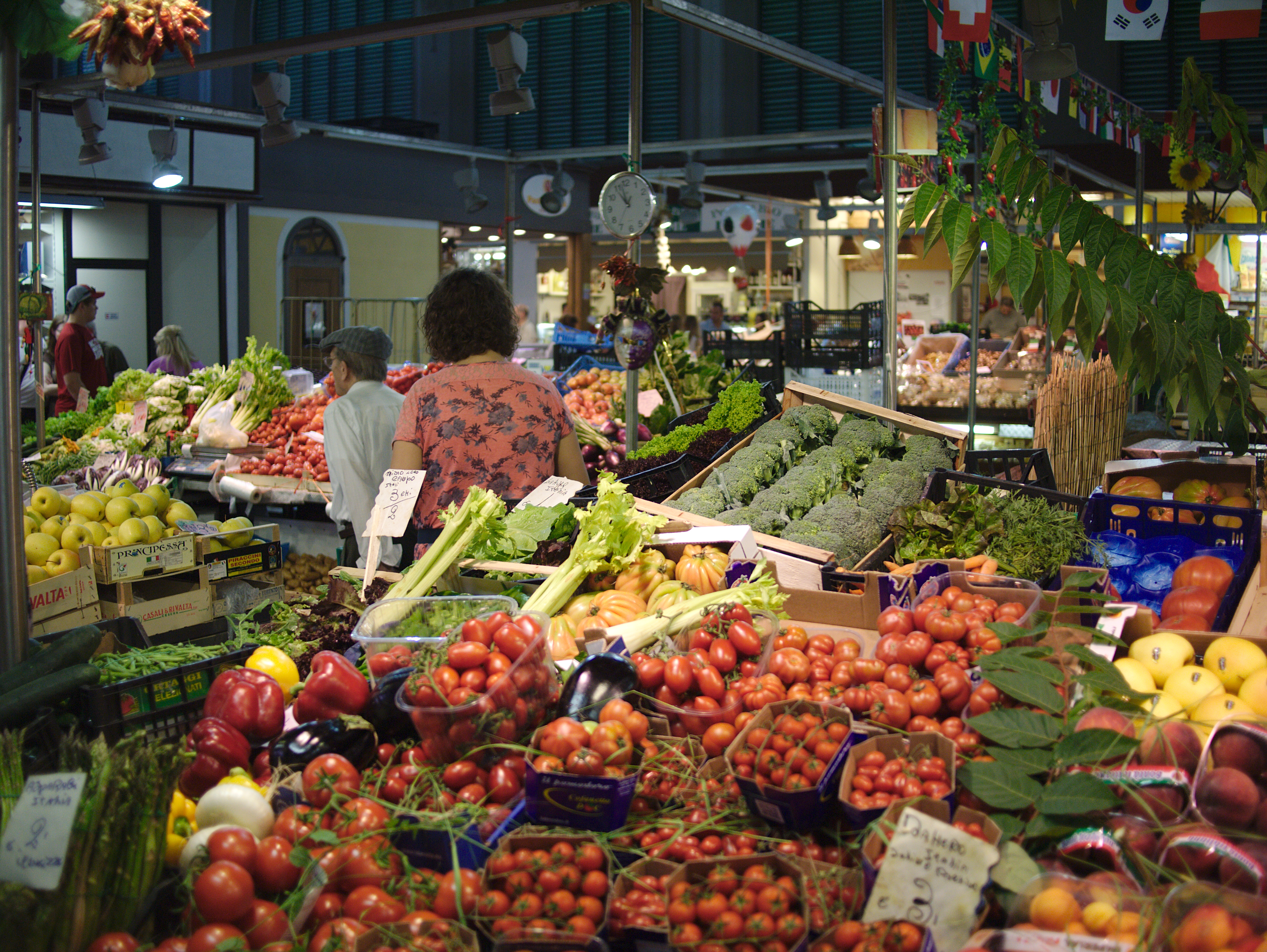
Fruit stands in Mercato Centrale, Florence

=== 20th-century emergence ===
Modern roadside produce stands emerged across North America during the 20th century as a product of agrarian production interacting with expanding automobile culture. After World War I, the spread of personal automobile ownership turned rural highways into commercial corridors, encouraging farms who lived along these roads to set up direct sales points for passersby. In his 1934 essay on rural roadside commercialism, James Agee highlights the structural diversity of these business ventures, writing:

There are stands and there are stands. Stands that started on shoe-strings and still dangle therefrom and stands that started on shoe-string and have become whole shoe stores.

These early roadside fruit stands were usually simple, temporary structures, such as inverted produce crates or small wooden tables with a canopy. Materials were usually repurposed or salvaged from farms. Some stands were left unattended and operated on an honour system, with fruit displayed and a sign instructing customers to leave payment in a designated container.

As motor traffic continued to increase, sellers expanded and fortified these temporary structures. Climate was a primary concern, as soft fruit deteriorated rapidly in summer heat. Consequently, operators made use of canopy overhangs, wooden verandas, and hinged window flaps that would be opened during business hours to promote ventilation and provide shade. Over time, many of these fruit stands became permanent buildings, with locks, electricity, and running water.

=== Agricultural policy, post-war expansion, and regional growth ===
The rapid spread of roadside fruit stands in the mid-20th century was driven by agricultural policy exemptions, post-World War II highway expansions, and economic pressure on smaller farms. A historical case study in the southern Interior of British Columbia was conducted in the 1950s; in 1939, regional agricultural regulations established a mandatory single-desk cooperative marketing board (BC Tree Fruits), requiring all commercial tree fruit to be sold through centralized co-op pools. However, the legislation exempted "farm-gate" sales, permitting growers to sell small quantities of produce directly to consumers on their own property.

Between 1950 and 1953, the number of stalls increased from fewer than a dozen to over 300 in the region, and over 350 by 1958. This rapid growth led to political friction within the agricultural community, as cooperative growers bound to central marketing viewed roadside stands as a "direct refutation" of co-operative principles. In response to this, regional authorities set regulations restricting the volume motorists could purchase at roadside stands (five boxes per vehicle) and deployed highway inspectors (colloquially, the "fruit police") to monitor. Despite tensions, roadside fruit stands became deeply integrated into regional economies. Corporate evolution and commercial scale

While most fruit stands continue to operate as small, independent sole proprietorships, several major commercial grocery chains and food conglomerates originated as simple roadside produce stalls:

- Dorothy Lane Market (DLM): Established in 1948 as a single roadside fruit stand in Ohio, the enterprise gradually expanded into a regional chain of specialty grocery stores.
- Sprouts Farmers Market: Traces its organizational history and retail model back to early roadside fresh produce stands before becoming a major national grocery retailer, with over $2.5 million actual sales in 2013.
- Dole Food Company: Originated in Hawaii as a single roadside pineapple stand, expanding over the 20th century into a multinational agricultural food conglomerate operating across more than 90 countries and generating over $6.9 billion in annual revenue.

== Regulation ==
The U.S. Department of Agriculture was created in the 1860s. By the 1890s, the USDA was beginning to become involved in livestock inspections. In 1905, the U.S. government had a call to action when Upton Sinclair's polemic against unsanitary working conditions at the expansive Chicago stockyards was published as a magazine serial. This became a national issue in part because the millions of animals were slaughtered and processed each year were distributed via rail to markets all across the nation. Initially a socialist's demand for better conditions for labor, ‘The Jungle’ was a catalyst for food industry regulation.

The U.S. Food and Drug Administration is the federal agency tasked with food safety regulation. States also pass laws regulating food industry issues. From the FDA website:

In much of the Global South, fruit stalls and other street vendors operate partially or entirely in an informal economy. Because these businesses are unregistered, food safety and hygiene rule are often weakly enforced, and the government has difficulty including informal vendors in hygiene policies. In 2026, an estimated 86% of employment in Africa, 68% in Asia and the Pacific, and 53% in Latin America and the Caribbean operated under this informal economy, compared to 18% in North America. Governments have made efforts to lower the barriers to registration for independent businesses, but this alone has not eliminated informality amongst these small businesses. Fruit stands in particular are left out of formal supply chains. For example, in South Africa's Onderburg district, informal banana vendors are central to banana retail, but are excluded from the formal banana value chain.

Fruit stands are a subset of street vendors; for more information pertaining to the regulation of fruit stands, see Hawker (trade).

== Demographics ==
=== North America ===
Research in Wisconsin found that around 33% of roadside fruit stand customers reside in cities with a population of around 50 000. Many of these stands also heavily rely on local populations, the majority of consumers drive less than 15-20 miles to direct market produce stands. Additionally, roadside fruit stands are more popular with older age demographics, 43% of customers in the Wisconsin study were ages 25-45 and 25% were over 62 years old. Moreover, approximately 60% have a higher educational attainment than high-school. According to research in British Columbia, roadside fruit stands in southern BC were family owned and brought produced from small family owned orchards to main roadways in the early 50s. In every province and territory, with the exception of Nunavut, farms sell produce direct to consumers through fruit and vegetable stands. According to StatsCan, 34.3% of all Canadian fruit and nut farms operated an on site produce stand. Direct farm to consumer sales through fruit stands are regionally concentrated in Ontario, Quebec and British Columbia. The revenue from fruit stands proves vital for many Canadian farms as direct profits from stands provided 100% of revenue for 42.9% of farms that utilized these stands.

=== Africa ===
Across South Africa and Ghana fruit and vegetable stand vendors are predominantly women. In Gqeberha 96.7% of street produce vendors were female in the Ho Central Market in Ghana 93.8% of produce vendors were female. This reflects broader regional patterns where women are overrepresented in the formal workforce. Additionally, in Gqeberha South Africa the mean age of fruit stand sellers is 39.05-39.5 years, while in the Ho Central Market the vast majority of sellers were 21-50 years age and in Abeokuta 68% of vendors were 30-49 and 40% were 30-39. Fruit stands are generally clustered around urban workplaces, schools, and transit hubs such as bus terminals and train stations. In Nigeria, fruit stands and vendors are very popular with undergraduate university students seeking out quick meals and with university employees who work long hours. Additionally, across African cities street produce stands are generally popular among low income urban residents and workers who depend on readily accessible foods to meet nutritional needs.

== Trends ==
In the US there has been an increasing consumer emphasis on the importance of “freshness” in produce, which could lead to increased popularity of fruit stands. Since 1997 studies have shown that product “freshness” has become priority over low-fat, convenience and price in purchasing decisions. Therefore, roadside fruit stands gained a competitive advantage over supermarkets. Additionally the American market has experienced an increasing consumer preference for ‘local’ foods, expanding marketing opportunities for roadside fruit stands. However in Canada, in 2020 the number of on-site farm stands declined by 11.3% as farmers turned to alternative channels such as home delivery.

== Public policy research ==
=== Harvard Law School ===
Harvard Law School established their Food Law and Policy Clinic of the Center for Health Law and Policy Innovation in 2010 to address growing concerns about the health, environmental, and economic consequences of the laws and policies that structure the U.S. food system.

Their 2012 report titled ‘Good Laws, Good Food: Putting State Food Policy to Work for our Communities’ was a collaboration with Mark Winne, respected food distribution expert, food industry activist and author of ‘Closing the Food Gap.’ Winne's term ‘food desert’ characterizes areas, usually urban, which do not have a local supermarket. This situation, according to Winne and others, underpins a kaleidoscope of social and economic challenges for neighborhood residents.

== See also ==
- Greengrocer
