= Theodore Caplow =

American social entrepreneur, environmental engineer, and inventor (born 1969)

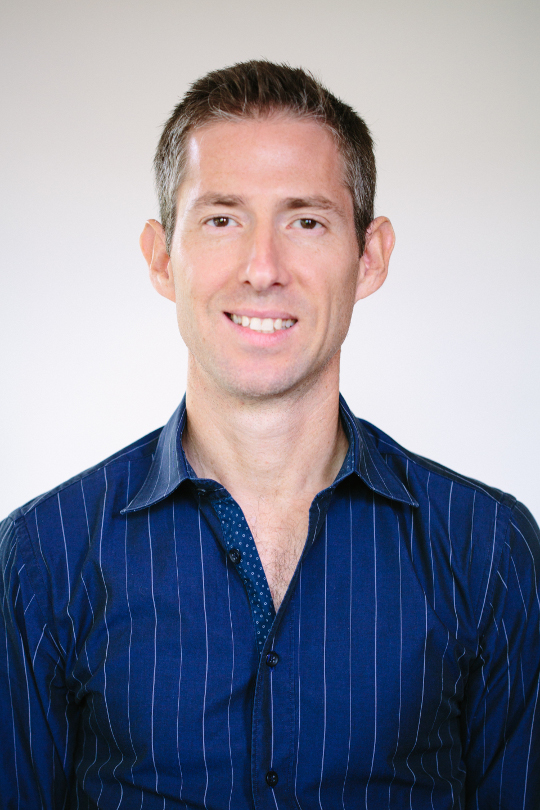
Dr. Ted Caplow

Theodore "Ted" Caplow (born 1969) is an American social entrepreneur, environmental engineer, and inventor. He is the founder of greenhouse science lab provider New York Sun Works and the co-founder of AgTech supply-chain disruptor BrightFarms.

Caplow's pioneering work in urban agriculture and vertical farming began with the Science Barge in Yonkers, New York. Caplow has also patented a vertically integrated greenhouse (VIG). Caplow subsequently co-founded Caplow|Manzano in 2017 with Nathalie Manzano to pursue innovations in resilient housing design and sustainable-building technology.

As an academic, Caplow holds a Doctor of Philosophy degree in engineering from Columbia University and has published a series of peer-reviewed articles on water-contaminant dynamics in the Hudson River estuary, in addition to articles on building-integrated agriculture.

== Early life and education ==
Theodore Caplow (birth name: Theodore Caplow Jr.) was born in New York City in 1969 to Anne Christine Allen and Theodore Caplow. His father was a well-known American sociologist and author of over twenty books in the social sciences.

Caplow grew up in central Virginia and attended Groton School in Massachusetts. He entered Harvard University intending to major in physics but graduated cum laude with a Bachelor of Arts degree in sociology in 1992. Following college, Caplow, together with his father and other family members, sailed a forty-seven–foot boat from New York City to Cyprus, stimulating his interest in engineering.

He received a Master of Science degree in mechanical engineering in 1998 from Princeton University, where his interest in renewable energy was fostered by Robert H. Socolow and Daniel Kammen and where he received a National Science Foundation Graduate Fellowship. Caplow's thesis at Princeton was an extended design modeling and optimization project for a solar thermal "power tower" that explored the feasibility of employing gas turbines in these designs.

Caplow completed his Doctor of Philosophy degree in environmental engineering in 2004 at Columbia University, where he was influenced by Peter Schlosser, Vijay Modi, Klaus Lackner, and Upmanu Lall, among others. Caplow's dissertation concerned the hydrodynamics of contaminant transport in the Hudson River estuary and his scholarly work in this field has appeared in Environmental Science & Technology, the Journal of Environmental Engineering and Acta Horticulturae.

== Contributions to sustainable technology ==
=== Inventors at Frost Science ===
Caplow conceived and, together with Nathalie Manzano, developed Inventors-in-Residence, a science prize competition and residency program which debuted in 2017 at the Phillip and Patricia Frost Museum of Science in Miami, Florida. The winning technologies focused on coral-reef restoration and airborne carcinogen detection, respectively. The winning scientific teams worked in public-facing laboratories and interacted with museum guests, discussing why their work matters, what kind of progress they have made, and what hurdles lie ahead. The laser project later transitioned to Ransom Everglades School.

=== Science Barge ===
Caplow is known for conceiving and developing the Science Barge urban farm in 2006. The Science Barge functions as both an experimental platform for closed-loop high-efficiency food production using renewable energy and an educational tool to improve opportunities for hands-on "experiential" STEM (science, technology, engineering, mathematics) learning for inner city students. In 2009, the Science Barge was named "Best Class Trip" by New York magazine.

Caplow conceived of the project, raised and contributed funding, determined which systems to include on the barge, and drew the initial plans. Execution of the design and various details of the greenhouse, water recovery, and solar/wind-power systems were completed by the entire team at New York Sun Works. After being stationed in Hudson River Park from 2006 to 2008, the Science Barge moved to Yonkers, New York, where it continues to host educational tours for school children during the week and is open for public visitation on the weekends. Over the years, the Science Barge has received a significant amount of national and international press including articles from National Geographic and The New York Times.

In March 2015, a team led by Nathalie Manzano and including Caplow won the inaugural Knight Cities Challenge from the John S. and James L. Knight Foundation with a proposal to build a Miami Science Barge in downtown Miami, Florida. It launched in April 2016. Similar to the Science Barge in New York, it was off-grid and focused on sustainability. The Miami Science Barge though, also concentrated on marine ecology and conservation in Biscayne Bay, and emphasized clean aquaculture for the domestic production of seafood. The Miami Science Barge was destroyed by Hurricane Irma in 2017.

=== Vertical-farming technology ===
Caplow invented the vertically integrated greenhouse (VIG) with Zakery Ward Adams. The invention is listed as Patent US20090307973 and was published in December 2009. The VIG consists of vertically stacked plant trays that can be moved to maximize plant light capture and shade as necessary. In addition to the trays and suspension system, the VIG system includes a closed-loop water distribution system which consists of a reservoir, a pump, and a water supply tube for growing plants hydroponically. According to the patent abstract, "the design is particularly well-suited for installation in a double-skin façade of a building, or in an interior atrium, lobby, or similar structure". Caplow and Adams built and installed prototypes of the VIG on the Science Barge (2008), at PS 333 in Manhattan (2010), and at PS 89 in Brooklyn (2011), and Caplow built an improved VIG at the Miami Museum of Science (2012) and on the Miami Science Barge (2016) but the design has yet to see commercial use.

=== New York Sun Works ===
Caplow founded New York Sun Works in 2004 and chairs the not-for-profit's board of directors. Caplow was closely involved in the development of the Sun Works Center at PS 333, the first full-scale rooftop greenhouse completed in 2010 as part of a NY Sun Works campaign to build 100 school greenhouses in NYC between 2010 and 2020. The campaign succeeded after the greenhouse educational system was expanded to include conversion of existing classrooms into hydroponic laboratories. As of 2022, New York Sun Works had built and operated over 200 greenhouse labs, mostly in New York City public schools, trained 700 teachers, and created over 800 curriculum lessons for use in these greenhouse labs.

=== BrightFarms ===
From 2008 to 2011, through design consultancy BrightFarm Systems, Caplow contributed to the design of a 10,000-sq-ft. greenhouse built on top of the Forest Houses apartment complex in the South Bronx, New York, an in-store hydroponic greenhouse constructed at Whole Foods Market in Millburn, New Jersey, and a rooftop greenhouse at P.S. 89 in Brooklyn. Many other design studies in building-integrated agriculture (a term Caplow coined in 2007) were executed for clients around the world. Prominent architectural and engineering firms who collaborated on design studies with BrightFarms while Caplow led the firm include Kiss + Cathcart, Skidmore Owings & Merrill, Grimshaw Architects, Foster and Partners, and Arup, among others.

In the wake of the economic downturn of 2007–2009, Caplow partnered with Paul Lightfoot (in 2011) to reformulate BrightFarms Systems as a full-service commercial farming company named BrightFarms. As of 2022, the company operated six large greenhouse farms across the country supplying salad greens to hundreds of grocery stores nationwide. Caplow was initially president of the board but sold his remaining stake in Brightfarms in 2021 when the company was acquired by Cox Enterprises.

== Work on child mortality ==
=== The Children's Prize ===
Caplow created the Children's Prize in 2013. Structured as a private foundation, the Children's Prize aims to save the lives of children under age five anywhere in the world. In the initial year, over 550 applications from 70 countries were received using a novel, openly accessible online application. Dr. Anita Zaidi was announced the winner of the 2013 Children's Prize on December 10, 2013, for her program in Rehri Goth, Pakistan. The Children's Prize launched its eighth iteration in 2022 and has funded children's health initiatives in ten countries around the world.

== Film and video ==
As part of his company Fish Navy Films, Caplow has written, produced, edited, narrated and appeared in a series of documentary films on sustainable seafood. Films produced by Fish Navy Films include Fish Meat (2012), Raising Shrimp (2013), and What We Fish For (2015). Caplow's primary scientific collaborator in all three films has been fish ecologist Andy J. Danylchuk.

== Awards and recognitions ==
Award	Awarding institution	Year
Guggenheim Fellowship	Princeton University	1996–1997
Graduate Energy Fellowship	Link Foundation	1997–1998
Graduate Research Fellowship	National Science Foundation	1998 (award), 2001–2003 (activated)
Presidential Fellowship	Columbia University, Fu Foundation School of Engineering and Applied Science)	2001–2004
Cui Servire Award	Groton School	2008
Social Entrepreneur of the Year	Casimiro Global Foundation	2013
