= Allison Kopf =

Founder and CEO of Artemis

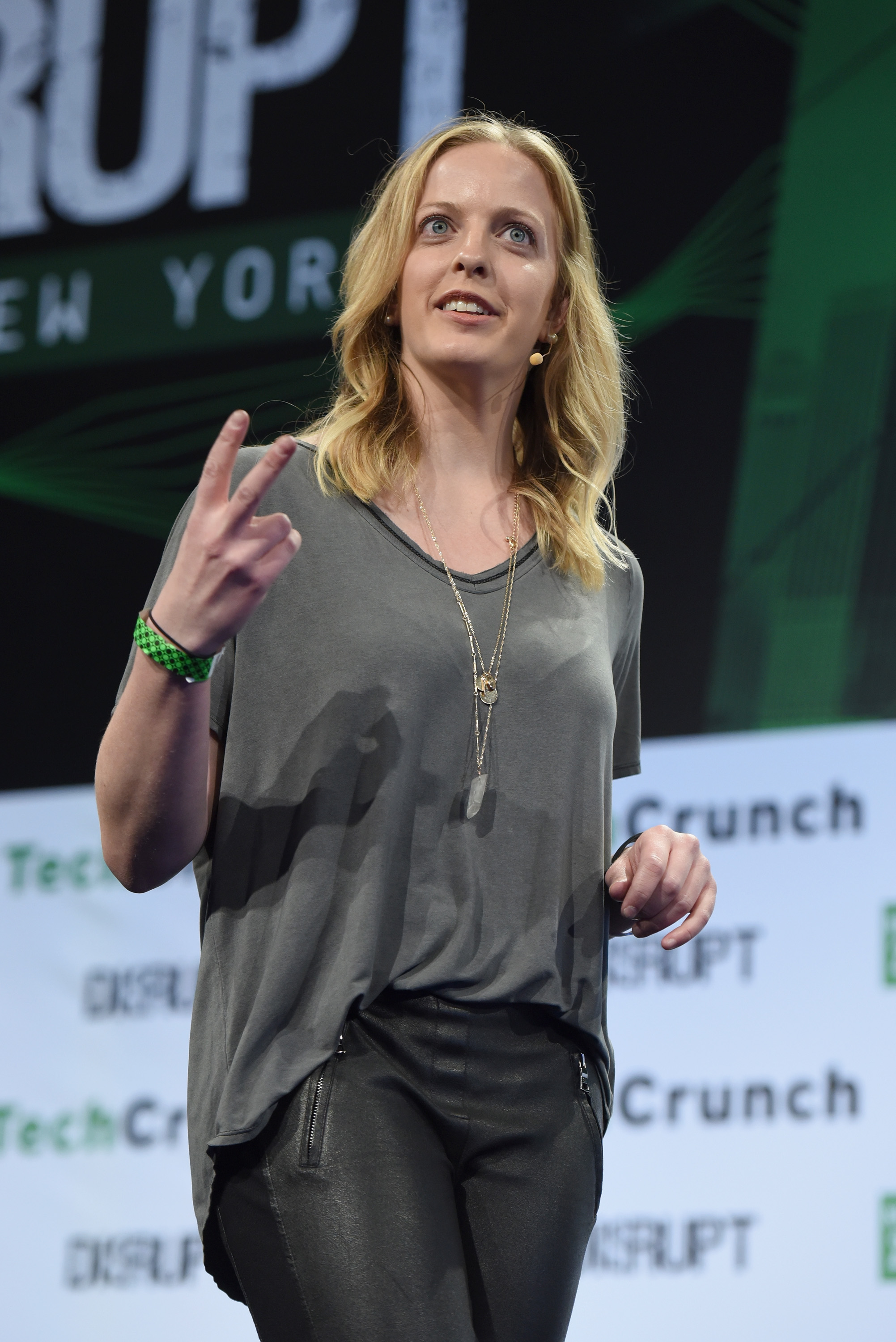
- Born: Allison Kopf; March 2, 1990 (age 36); New York, U.S.
- Education: Santa Clara University
- Occupations: Businesswoman, CEO
- Known for: Businesswoman, CEO of Artemis

Allison Kopf is founder and CEO of the enterprise Cultivation Management Platform (CMP) Artemis (formerly known as Agrilyst). Kopf is also Investment Partner at XFactor Ventures and serves on boards related to companies and organizations in the education and science sectors such as Santa Clara University and SCU Ciocca Center.

== Early life and education ==
Kopf was born and raised in New York, and went to Santa Clara University and gained her bachelors of science degree within physics.

== Career ==
In 2008, while gaining her degree, Kopf started her professional career in the solar industry, where she became the project manager for the California entry into the Solar Decathlon, a design and engineering competition. Kopf and her team raised over $1.2 million over two years and designed and built a solar-powered fully functional home.

In 2011, Kopf joined the American indoor farming company BrightFarms. During this time, Kopf worked as the company's Real Estate and Government Relations Manager, where she aided in scaling up projects in addition to focusing on how the organisation could improve operational performance of each site.

In 2015, Kopf left her position at BrightFarms and founded Agrilyst, a web-based Cultivation Management Platform (CMP). Agrilyst is a business intelligence platform designed to increase efficiency within the agriculture and farming industry, by pulling in data from sensors in greenhouses and information about crop yields and other metrics. Within the same year of the startup, Agrilyst won TechCrunch Disrupt's startup competition. As of 2019, Agrilyst's customer base consisted of 50% cannabis industry customers to aid in crop growth and maintenance.

During 2018, Kopf joined XFactor Ventures, a start up investment company that focuses on women and mixed gender team founders. She focuses primarily on investing in organisations based within fields of future of work, enterprise SaaS, agtech, and deep tech.

During 2021, Artemis was acquired by iUNU, a developer of greenhouse management platforms, at which point Kopf became Chief Growth officer for the organisation.

In January 2024, Kopf was appointed CEO of TRACT, a food and agriculture sustainability measurement platform.

== Recognition ==
In 2016, Kopf was named Entrepreneur of the Year by technical.ly Brooklyn for her efforts in the newfound field of digital horticulture.

Following this in 2016, Kopf was named Change Maker of the year for her work within the digital horticulture industry by the Association for Vertical Farming.

In 2019, Kopf was named one of the winners of the Women of Influence award by the New York Business Journal and Bizwomen.

In 2021, Kopf was named the winner of the Woman of Impact award from Global Women Fresh, an event that brings together women in produce to close the gender divide within the industry.

== Personal life ==
Kopf currently resides in the Netherlands with her husband and children.
