= Frost Museum =

Frost Museum may refer to either of two museums, both in Miami, Florida:

- Phillip and Patricia Frost Museum of Science
- Frost Art Museum
