= New York Sun Works =

- Formation: 2004; 22 years ago
- Founder: Ted Caplow
- Type: Nonprofit
- Tax ID no.: 20-0670312
- Legal status: 501(c)(3)
- Headquarters: New York, New York
- Executive Director: Manuela Zamora
- Website: https://nysunworks.org/

New York Sun Works, founded in 2004 by Ted Caplow, is a 501(c)(3) non-profit organization that uses hydroponic farming technology to educate students and teachers about the science of sustainability. Their Hydroponic Classroom program was a collaborative effort co-created by Manuela Zamora and Sidsel Robards, who were inspired by NY Sun Works' first project, the renowned Science Barge, a prototype sustainable urban farm and environmental education center previously docked on the Hudson River and now located in Yonkers under different ownership.

In 2010, New York Sun Works built the first of their Hydroponic Classrooms at a Manhattan public elementary school with the goal of teaching sustainability science and climate education. In 2022, they launched their Workforce Development Program pilot program with funding from the USDA, which certifies high school students in Controlled Environment Agriculture (CEA) techniques.

As of April 2024, they have built, maintained, and supported over 300 Hydroponic Classrooms in schools across Manhattan, Brooklyn, the Bronx, Queens, Staten Island, and New Jersey. NY Sun Works is an EPA, NAAEE, and Harvard Business School Club of NY award-winning organization and maintains a platinum-rated status on Guidestar and a Top-Rated status on GreatNonprofits.

== Hydroponic Classrooms ==
Originally launched under the name The Greenhouse Project, the Hydroponic Classroom program was created in 2008 to increase K-8th grade students' interest and proficiency in STEM education while understanding the environmental issues of their time: global climate change, efficient use of water and energy, building greener cities, and growing a secure and healthy food supply. The Hydroponic Classroom initiative uses urban agriculture technology to provide an ideal hands-on learning facility paired with a project-based, integrated curriculum. Shortly after the inception of the first Hydroponic Classrooms, curricular support expanded to include high school students, widening the scope of the program to grades K-12.

A Hydroponic Classroom can be built as a converted classroom or a traditional greenhouse farm to accommodate a hydroponic urban farm and environmental science laboratory. Children in grades K-12 grow food while engaging in hands-on learning about climate change, water resource management, efficient land use, biodiversity, conservation, contamination, pollution, waste management, nutrition, and sustainable development. To facilitate this learning environment, Hydroponic Classrooms typically include nutrient film technique hydroponic growing systems, hydroponic towers, Dutch-bucket systems, and a host of other supporting technologies.

Published May 6, 2019 in the Applied Environmental Education and Communication journal, the NY Sun Works Curriculum and Science Achievement Report conducted by Kate Gardner Burt, PhD, RD (Teachers College, Columbia University) concluded that students who receive the NY Sun Works curriculum are more likely to score higher on the 4th grade science achievement test than students who did not receive the NY Sun Works curriculum.

== Urban Agriculture Workforce Development Program ==
The NY Sun Works Urban Agriculture Workforce Development Program was originally launched as a pilot in the summer of 2022 with funding from the US Department of Agriculture. Part of NYC Mayor Eric Adams' Summer Youth Employment Program (SYEP), the pilot certified 32 students from Brooklyn and Queens in controlled environment agriculture (CEA) techniques.

Since the completion of this initial six week pilot program, the Workforce Development program has been adapted into a summer intensive, as well as both a semester & year-long elective science course. The program has also since expanded to the post-secondary level, supporting a Hydroponic Classroom and workforce development initiative at both LaGuardia Community College and Kingsborough Community College. The Hydroponic Classroom at LaGuardia CC was funded by Congresswoman Nydia Velázquez through Community Project Funding.

== Annual Youth Conference ==
Held annually since 2011, the Discovering Sustainability Science Youth Conference is a presentation of student works from NY Sun Works partner schools. After being held virtually throughout the COVID-19 pandemic, the 2023 Youth Conference took place on May 24th at the renowned Javits Center. Over 900 students in grades 2-12 gathered to watch their peers present on the research happening in their Hydroponic Classrooms. In addition, the conference included guest speakers from organizations and companies focused on STEM, sustainability, education, and urban farming.

The 2024 Youth Conference will also take place at the Javits Center on May 23rd.

== STEM Hydroponic Kits ==
NY Sun Works' STEM Hydroponic Kits were created in response to the COVID-19 pandemic as a way to enable students with Hydroponic Classrooms in their schools to continue learning in remote settings. Each kit consists of the materials and curriculum necessary to build passive hydroponic systems and grow a variety of crops.

The kits can now be used for instruction both at home and in the classroom as a portable and affordable way to engage students in hands-on climate education. During the fall of 2020, more than 7,000 kits were distributed to students across NYC. Similarly, 5000 additional kits were distributed during the 2022-23 school year, 600 of which were provided to schools in Queens District 29 through City Council Discretionary Funding.

== Achievements ==
- Designed and operated the Science Barge, a classroom and showcase for sustainable hydroponic agriculture, which had over 20,000 unique visitors. Now owned and operated by Groundwork Hudson Valley, the Science Barge is still an active teaching tool.
- Over 300 Hydroponic Classrooms are fully operational.
- Launched K-12th grade sustainable STEM curriculum designed for integration with the Hydroponic Classrooms.
- Received $2.1 million in federal funding as part of the 2023 Congressionally Funded Community Project (CFCP) earmark, with support from Sen. Chuck Schumer, Sen. Kirsten Gillibrand, and Reps. Yvette Clarke, Hakeem Jeffries, and Ritchie Torres.
- Received FY22 federal Community Project Funding to bring Hydroponic Classrooms to 20 schools in Representative Nydia Velázquez's Brooklyn and Queens NY-07 district.
- Hosted 12th Annual Discovering Sustainability Science Youth Conference, featuring 2nd-12th grade students from NY Sun Works partner schools presenting on a range of topics at the Javits Center. The upcoming 13th Youth Conference is similarly set to be held at the Javits Center.
- Launched Urban Agriculture Workforce Development Program, certifying NYC high school students in Controlled Environment Agriculture.
- Created STEM Hydroponic Kits to facilitate at-home climate science education in response to the COVID-19 pandemic.
- Held a pop-up expo at Astor Place to introduce students and their families to hydroponics and climate change.
- Featured in media outlets including
  - CBS News,
  - PBS Newshour,
  - PBS Metro News, Al Jazeera America, CNN,
  - NY1 News
  - ABC 7 News,
  - The New York Times,
  - NY Daily News,
  - Change Observer,
  - The Economist,
  - Edible Magazine,
  - TIME Magazine for Kids.
