= BrightFarms =

American indoor farming company

- Company type: Subsidiary
- Industry: Indoor farming
- Founder: Paul Lightfoot, Ted Caplow
- Headquarters: Irvington, New York, United States
- Parent: Cox Enterprises
- Website: www.brightfarms.com

BrightFarms is an American indoor farming company headquartered in Irvington, New York. It grows and supplies local, non-GMO, pesticide-free, and fresh salad greens to supermarkets. The produce is grown in computer-controlled hydroponic greenhouses.

== History ==
BrightFarms was founded by Ted Caplow and Paul Lightfoot in 2010.

As of 2019, BrightFarms had four greenhouses located in Wilmington, Ohio; Rochelle, Illinois; Culpeper County, Virginia; and Bucks County, Pennsylvania. In January 2020, the company opened its largest greenhouse - a 280,000 sq. ft. farm in Selinsgrove, Pennsylvania.

BrightFarms supplies its produce to established grocers including Walmart, Kroger, and Ahold Delhaize. Additionally, it supplies independent grocers in the Midwest, including Dorothy Lane Market. BrightFarms also joined the IBM Food Trust in October 2020.

In 2021 Cox enterprises; purchased BrightFarms, it was previously involved via investments 2018 and majority ownership in 2020. BrightFarms along with its sister company Mucci Farms is now part of the Cox Farms division under parent company Cox Enterprises.

== See also ==
- Theodore Caplow
