= Eleventh Street station (Miami) =

Miami Metromover station

Eleventh Street
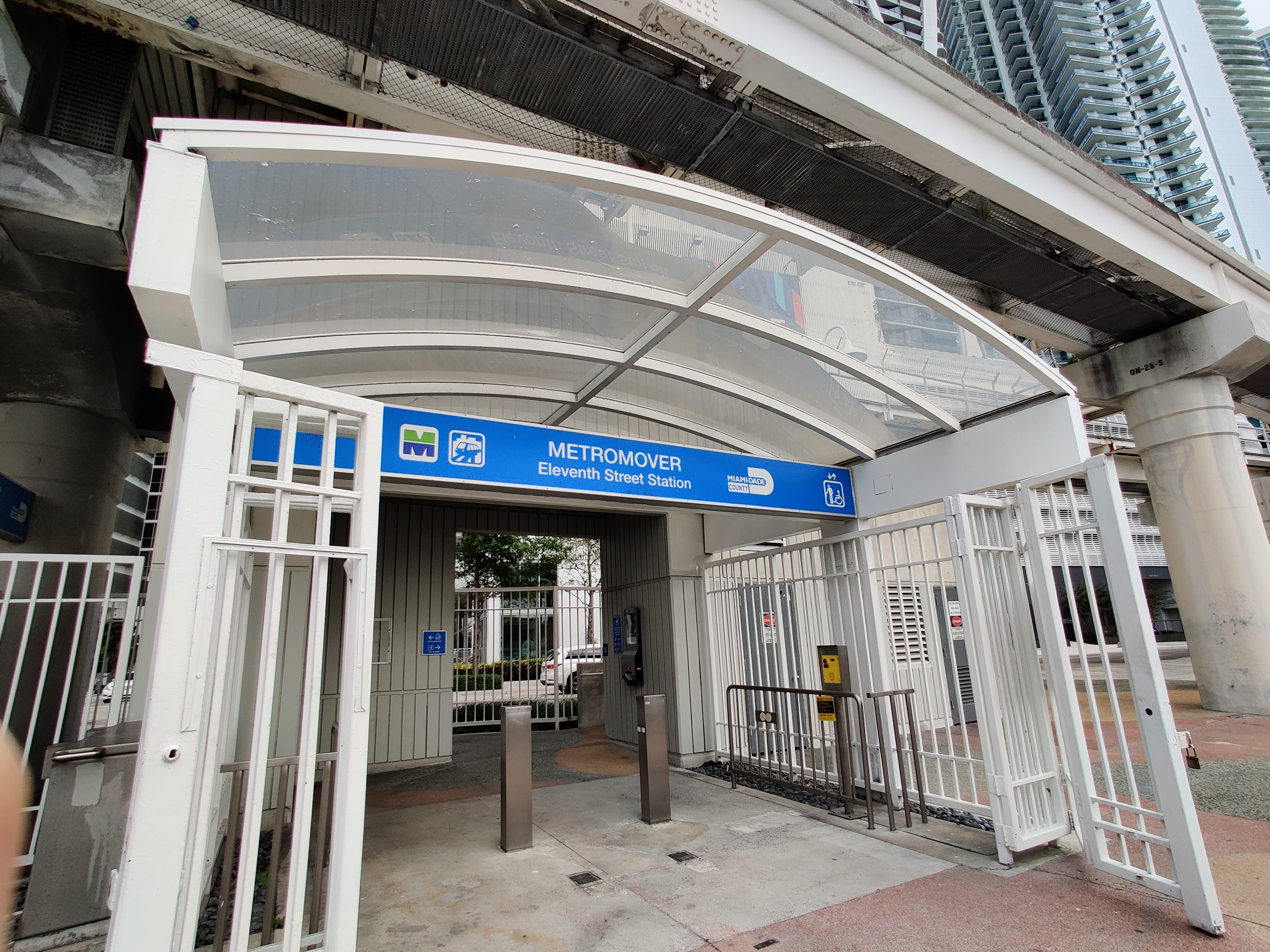
- Entrance to the station in 2020

General information
- Location: 1098 NE Second Avenue; Miami, Florida
- Coordinates: 25°47′5″N 80°11′27″W
- Owner: Miami-Dade County
- Platforms: 1 island platform
- Tracks: 2
- Connections: Metrobus: 9

Construction
- Accessible: Yes

History
- Opened: May 26, 1994

Services
Preceding station	Miami-Dade Transit	Following station
Miami Worldcenter toward Downtown	Omni Loop	Museum Park toward School Board
Location

Eleventh Street station is a Metromover station in the Park West neighborhood of Downtown, Miami, Florida. The station is located over Northeast 11th Street on the west side of Northeast 2nd Avenue. It opened on May 26, 1994, as part of the Omni extension.
