= Museum Park station =

Miami Metromover station

Museum Park
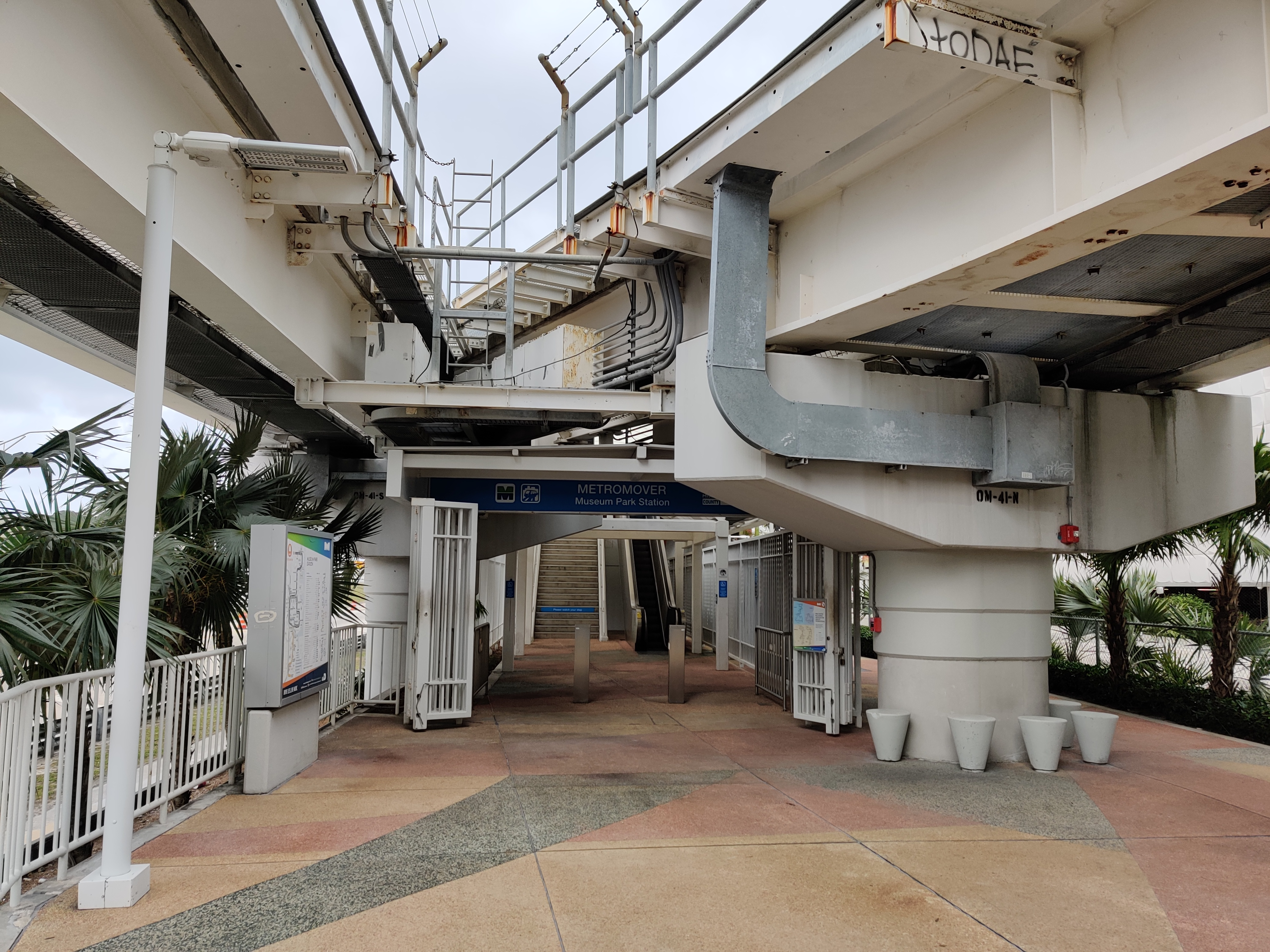
- View of the station and a departing Metrobus city bus

General information
- Location: 1191 Biscayne Boulevard; Miami, Florida 33132
- Coordinates: 25°47′9″N 80°11′16″W
- Owner: Miami-Dade County
- Platforms: 1 island platform
- Tracks: 2
- Connections: Metrobus: 3, 14, 20, 100, 203

Construction
- Accessible: Yes

History
- Opened: May 26, 1994; November 29, 2013
- Closed: October 28, 1996
- Former names: Bicentennial Park (1994–96)

Passengers
- 192 (weekday average, August 2014)

Services
Preceding station	Miami-Dade Transit	Following station
Eleventh Street toward Downtown	Omni Loop	Adrienne Arsht Center toward School Board
Location

Museum Park is a Metromover station located on the southeast corner of Biscayne Boulevard and I-395 in Miami, Florida. Originally opened as Bicentennial Park in 1994 and closed in 1996, the station reopened with the completion of the Pérez Art Museum Miami at the newly renamed eponymous park in 2013.

The station is located near the intersection of Biscayne Boulevard (US 1) and Northeast 11th Street, adjacent to the MacArthur Causeway (I-395/Florida A1A).

== History ==
The station opened May 26, 1994 when the Mover's Omni and Brickell extensions were inaugurated. The station was designed with long winding walk paths on the ground level. However the station was underused and subsequently fell prone to chronic vandalism by people who would steal, among other things, the metal edges of the concrete steps that lead to the platform. The then Metro-Dade Transit Agency kept replacing the stolen fixtures only for them to be swiped again. With low ridership at the station except during the Grand Prix of Miami, MDTA elected to close it effective October 28, 1996.

The station was refurbished by MDT with funds from the American Recovery and Reinvestment Act of 2009 and reopened as Museum Park November 29, 2013. By 2014, the station was once again plagued with low ridership, generally the lowest of the system's 21 stations.
