= Dorothy Lane Market =

American grocery store chain

Dorothy Lane Market, Inc.
- Type: Private
- Industry: Retail (Grocery)
- Founded: 1948
- Headquarters: Dayton, Ohio
- Revenue: $80 million USD
- Number of employees: 900
- Website: www.dorothylane.com

Dorothy Lane Market, often abbreviated to DLM, is a chain of gourmet grocery stores based and located in Dayton, Ohio. It originally began as a fruit stand in 1948, at the corner of Far Hills Avenue and Dorothy Lane in Kettering, Ohio. It is owned by the Mayne family, and it is in its fourth generation. The company's annual revenue is $80,000,000 and it has just over 900 employees. A culinary school is also located at the Dorothy Lane Market in Centerville, Ohio. The school hosts classes, available to the public, multiple times weekly.

== Overview ==
Dorothy Lane Market is a chain of speciality food markets that has more than nine departments located within each store. They include expanded speciality seafood, bakery, dairy, frozen, floral, grocery, meat, produce, cheeses, and wines.

== History ==
Previous logo style

Dorothy Lane Market began as a fruit stand in 1948, at the corner of Far Hills Ave. and Dorothy Lane in Kettering, Ohio. The stand was co-owned by Calvin Mayne and Frank Sakada. In 1953, the original store was built in Oakwood, Montgomery County, Ohio. This location came in at 20,000 sq. ft.

In 1960, Calvin Mayne bought Sakada's shares of the company, becoming the sole owner.

In 1991, Dorothy Lane Market opened a second location in Centerville, Ohio. A third location opened in Springboro, Ohio in 2002. In 2005, the company's produce departments were certified organic by the Ohio Ecological Food and Farm Association. In October 2021, DLM announced plans for a 4th location in Mason, Ohio., which opened in August 2025.

== Accolades ==
In 2001 and 2007, Dorothy Lane Market was named one of only six Outstanding Retailers by the National Association for the Specialty Food Trade (NASFT) at the International Fancy Food Show in New York City.

In 2009, Dorothy Lane Market won a Readers Choice Award in the Best Gourmet Grocery category.
