= Phillip and Patricia Frost Museum of Science =

Science museum in Miami, Florida, US

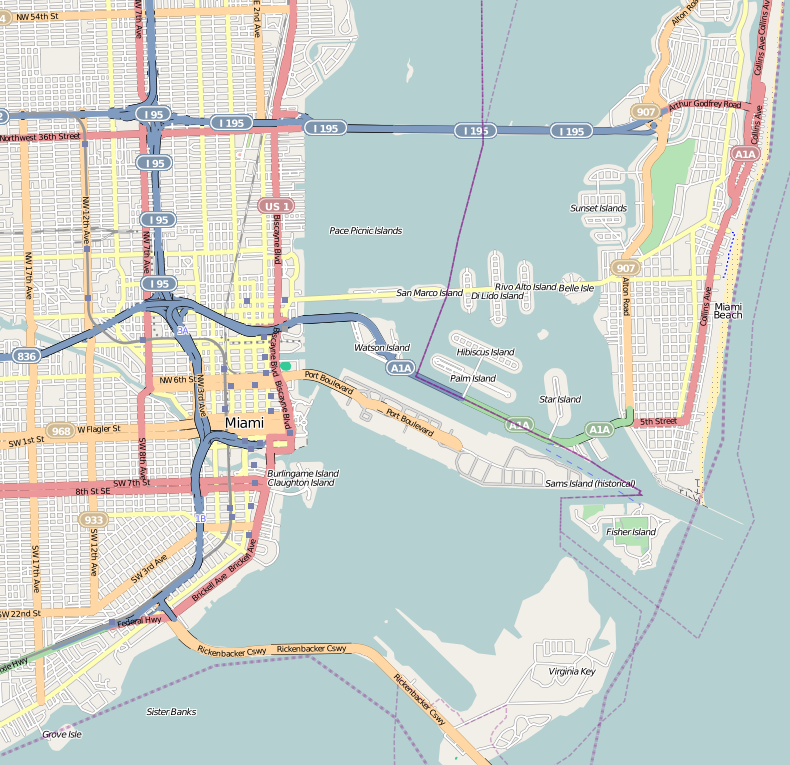
- Location within Central Miami Location within Florida Location within the United States
- Former name: Miami Science Museum and Space Transit Planetarium
- Established: 1949 (as the Junior Museum of Miami)
- Location: Maurice A. Ferré Park, Miami, Florida, U.S.
- Coordinates: 25°47′07″N 80°11′16″W
- Type: Science museum
- Accreditation: AAM, ASTC
- Visitors: Estimated 700,000 per year
- President: Doug Roberts (2023–present)
- Public transit access: Metrorail access at Museum Park Station (formerly Vizcaya station)
- Website: www.frostscience.org

The Phillip and Patricia Frost Museum of Science, formerly known as the Miami Science Museum or Miami Science Museum and Space Transit Planetarium, is a science museum, planetarium, and aquarium located in Miami, Florida, United States. The museum originally opened its Coconut Grove location across from Vizcaya Museum and Gardens in 1960. It relocated to Maurice A. Ferré Park in the downtown area adjacent to the Perez Art Museum Miami in 2017 after the closing of the Coconut Grove location in 2015.

== History ==
In 1950, the Junior League of Miami opened the Junior Museum of Miami. It was located inside a house on the corner of Biscayne Boulevard and NE 26th Street. Women of the Junior League started it with little seed money and lots of volunteer hours. The exhibits were made up of donated items, such as a hive of live honeybees which hung outside a window, and loaned materials, such as Seminole artifacts from the University of Florida.

In 1952, the museum relocated to a larger space in the Miami Women's Club building on North Bayshore Drive. At that time it was renamed Museum of Science and Natural History.

In 1953, the Guild of the Museum of Science was formed, adding volunteers to assist the staff, run the museum store, and conduct tours and outreach programs.

In 1960, Dade County built a new 48,000 sq ft (4,500 m^{2}) museum building on a three-acre (12,000 m^{2}) site in an area of Miami called Coconut Grove, on property belonging to the Vizcaya Museum and Gardens complex.

In 1966, the Space Transit Planetarium was added with a Spitz Model B Space Transit Projector. One of only 12 of its type that were built, the projector was the last one still in operation when the museum closed in 2015. The Planetarium was the home of the national astronomy television show Star Gazers with Jack Horkheimer, produced by Miami's PBS member station WPBT.

In 2011, the museum launched and hosted the annual Miami Underwater Festival, in partnership with the French Festival Mondial de l’Image Sous-Marine (World Festival of Underwater Images). The festival was founded and sponsored by underwater photographer Marko Dimitrijevic and his wife, Shelly.

In 1989, the museum's lease agreement with Vizcaya was extended by 99 years, to 2088.

In 2015, the museum's Coconut Grove location closed in anticipation of the new museum's opening in 2017. The dismantled Spitz projector was moved to the HistoryMiami museum in downtown Miami and placed on permanent display.

=== Relocation ===
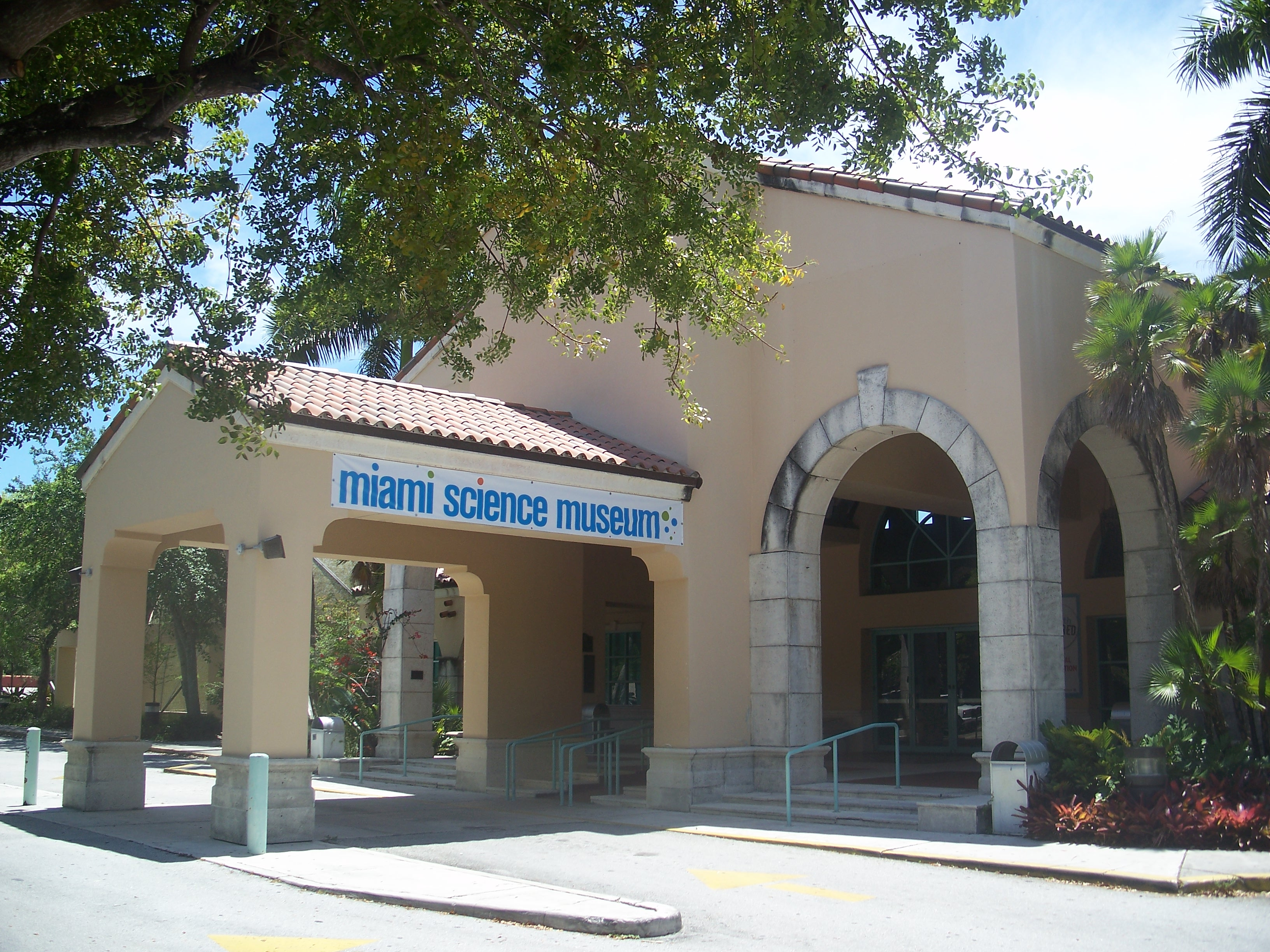
Old location of the science museum prior to closing

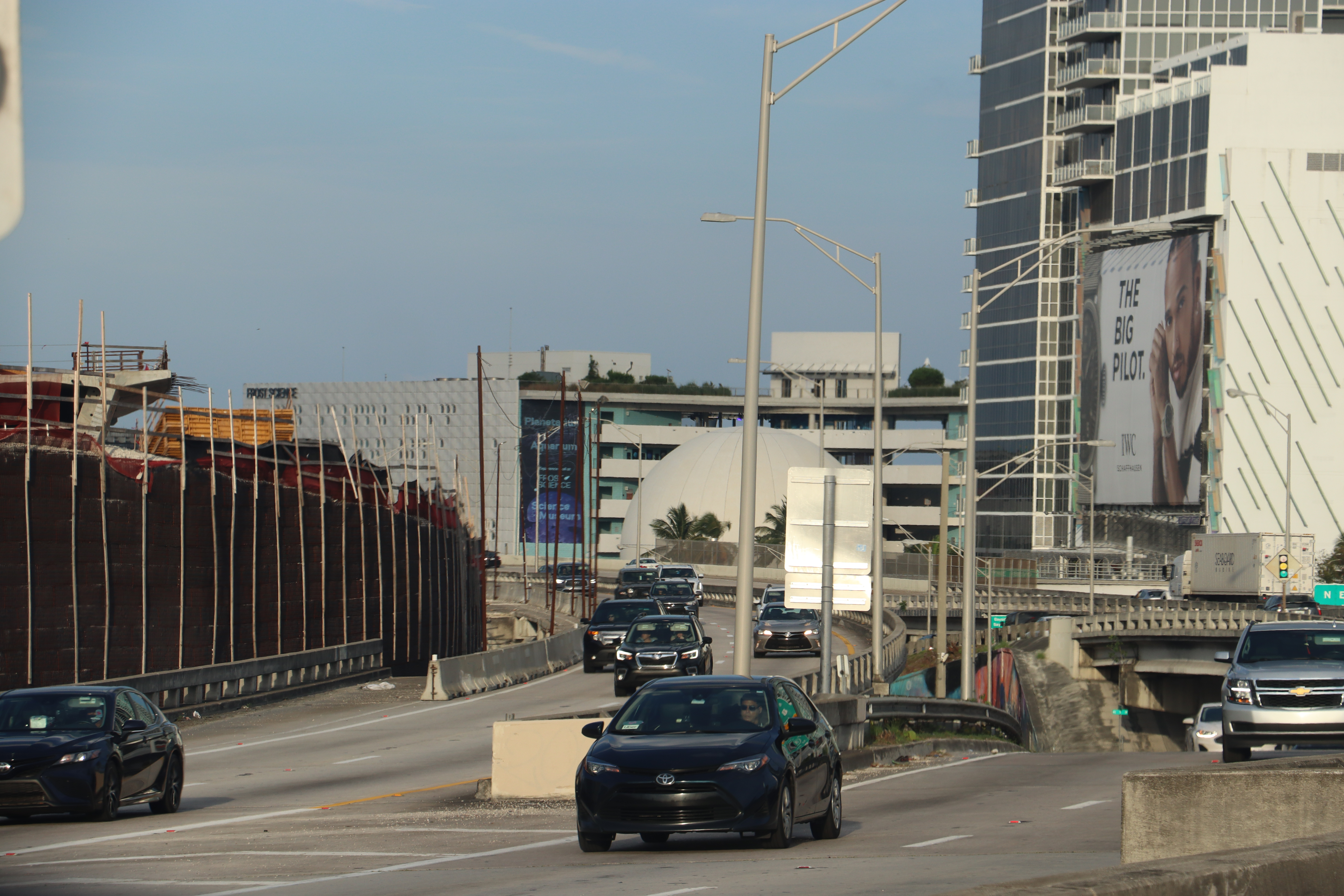
The museum's new location, in the center of the image showing the planetarium dome, along I-395

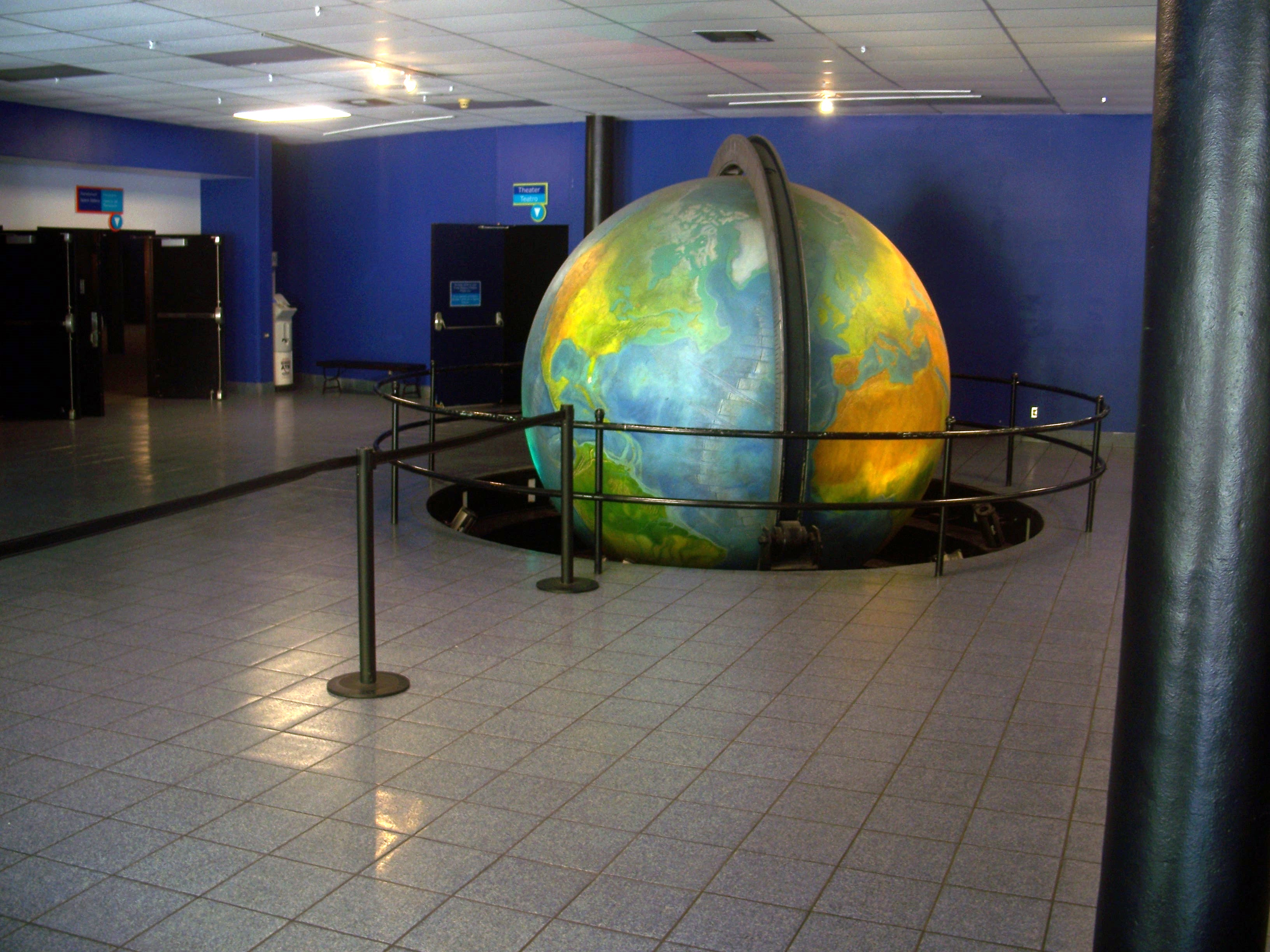
Lobby of MSTP before closing

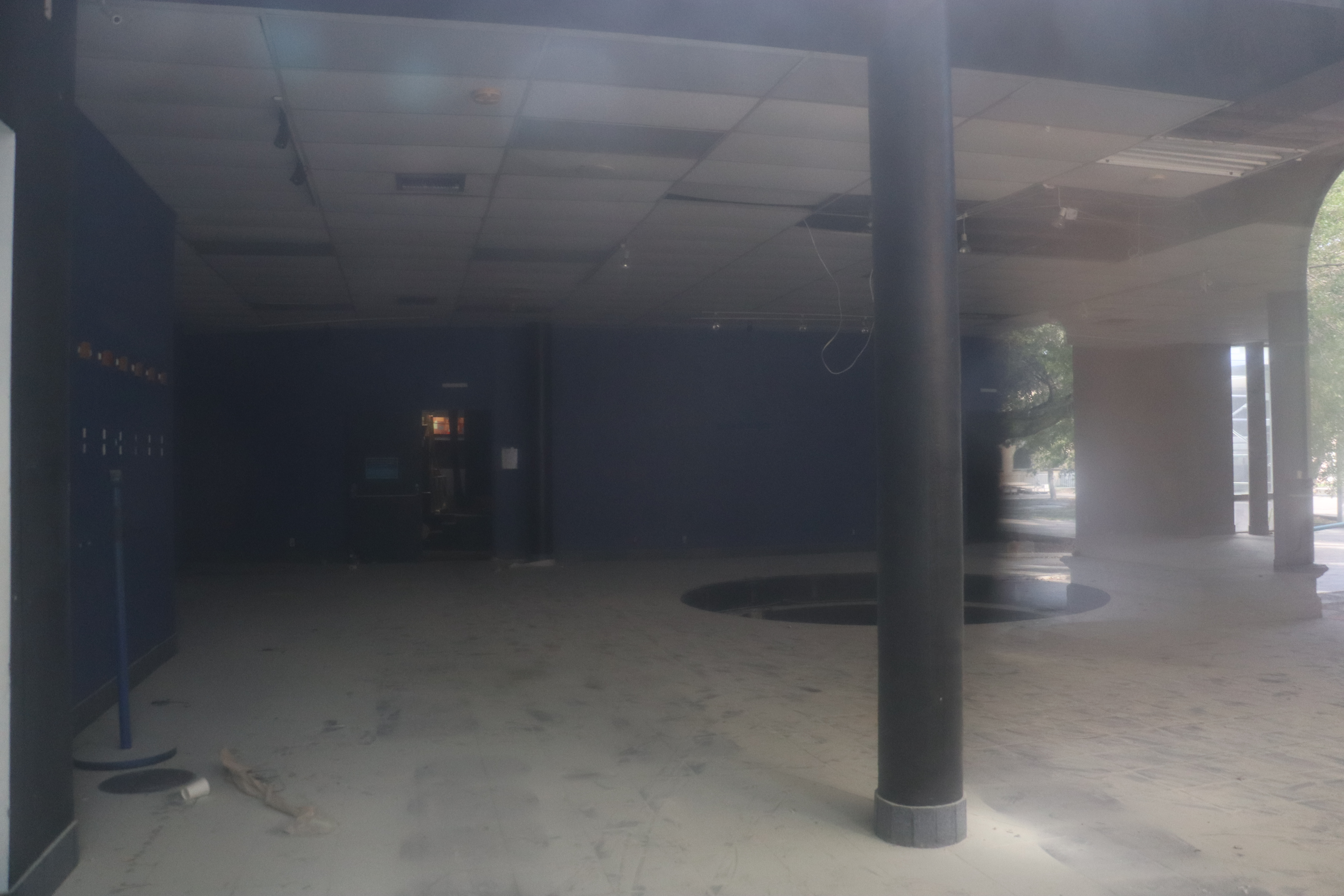
Lobby of the museum after its closing

In March 2011, Miami native Phillip Frost and his wife, Patricia, donated $35 million for the construction of a new science museum in Downtown Miami. The museum was designed by the New York studio of global firm Grimshaw Architects; Miami's Rodriguez & Quiroga Architects Chartered played an executive role.

Completed at a cost of $305 million, the new 250,000 sq ft (23,000 m^{2}) Philip and Patricia Frost Museum of Science opened on May 8, 2017, in downtown Miami's Museum Park. Sitting on four acres (1.6 ha), the new LEED Gold-certified complex consists of four interconnected buildings with parking underneath:

- The Frost Planetarium is a 250-seat full-dome screen with a diameter of 67 feet (20 m) and a 16-million-color, 8K projection system.
- The three-story, cone-shaped, 500,000-US-gallon (1,900,000 L) Aquarium is open to the top level and also includes a 31-foot (9.4 m) diameter oculus lens at the bottom for viewing the fish, rays and sharks.
- The North and West Wings contain permanent and rotating exhibit galleries, Guest and Member Services, concessions and the gift shop, offices, and the Knight Learning Center with four classrooms.

As of June 15, 2023 the former site of the Miami Science Museum and Space Transit Planetarium has been demolished to make way for the Vizcaya Village project.

== Exhibits ==
=== Aquarium ===
The museum features a multi-level aquarium featuring habitats commonly seen in South Florida and the surrounding areas. The top deck of the Aquarium features key South Florida ecosystems, including the 100-foot wide, 500,000-gallon Gulf Stream Aquarium, where creatures such as mahi-mahi, devil rays, hammerhead sharks and others can be found. The middle level features habitats such as: coral reefs, mangrove forests, and the Gulf Stream. Nearly 30 aquariums and interactive vessels are included to demonstrate the bio-diversity of sub tropical habitats. The bottom-most level exhibits the Gulf Stream Aquarium where drifters such as jellyfish ride the massive flow running along Florida's east coast and into the North Atlantic. The aquarium culminates on this floor with a 31-foot oculus lens forming the bottom of the Gulf Stream Aquarium.

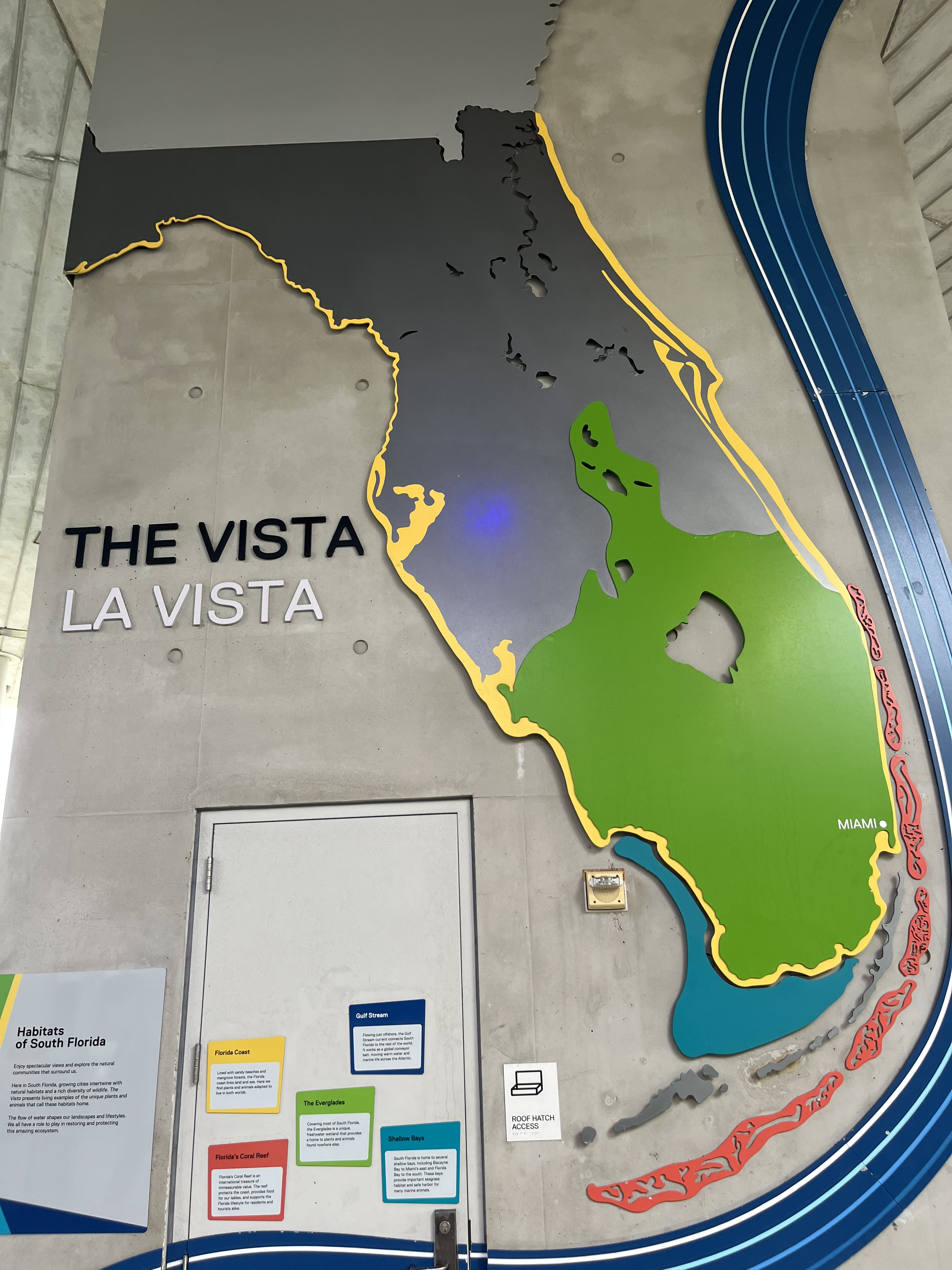
The Vista - La Vista

=== Planetarium ===
The Frost Planetarium seats 250 people and features six 16-million-color 8K projectors, surround sound, and a 67-foot wide dome screen tilted forward at 23.5°. The planetarium also hosts laser show nights on select dates featuring laser graphics set to music from bands such as Pink Floyd and Queen.

=== Power of Science ===
The Power of Science exhibits the past achievements of scientists and researchers, while also exhibiting the future of science. The exhibit hosts a series of hands-on exhibits, interactives, rare specimens, an interactive floor, a deep dive into the periodic table of elements, a showcase of collection pieces and scientific instruments used across various scientific fields, and more. Guests learn about the scientific process and other related concepts. The exhibit focuses on four main realms of science: the ocean, the environment, the human body, and the universe.

=== Solar System and Beyond ===
Solar System and Beyond showcases over 20 photos and artist renderings of celestial objects by NASA.

=== Feathers to the Stars ===
Feathers to the Stars exhibits the history of flight from animals utilizing wings, to humans creating airplanes and spacecraft. The exhibit features demonstrations of lift, drag, and thrust using a small wind tunnel. The exhibit also features a glass cabinet of assorted NASA memorabilia and artifacts.

=== meLab ===
meLab is an interactive exhibit focused on health and well being, highlighting the importance of making good choices for better long-term outcomes. The exhibit is split on two levels of the museum's west wing. on Level 2, guests explore what being healthy means and how to experiment with lifestyle choices to see their extremes. Featuring interactive games to engage children of all ages and promote healthy competition in learning. Level 3, contains elements more focused displays to exhibit what healthy means at the microscopic and scholastic level of medical science.

=== River of Grass ===
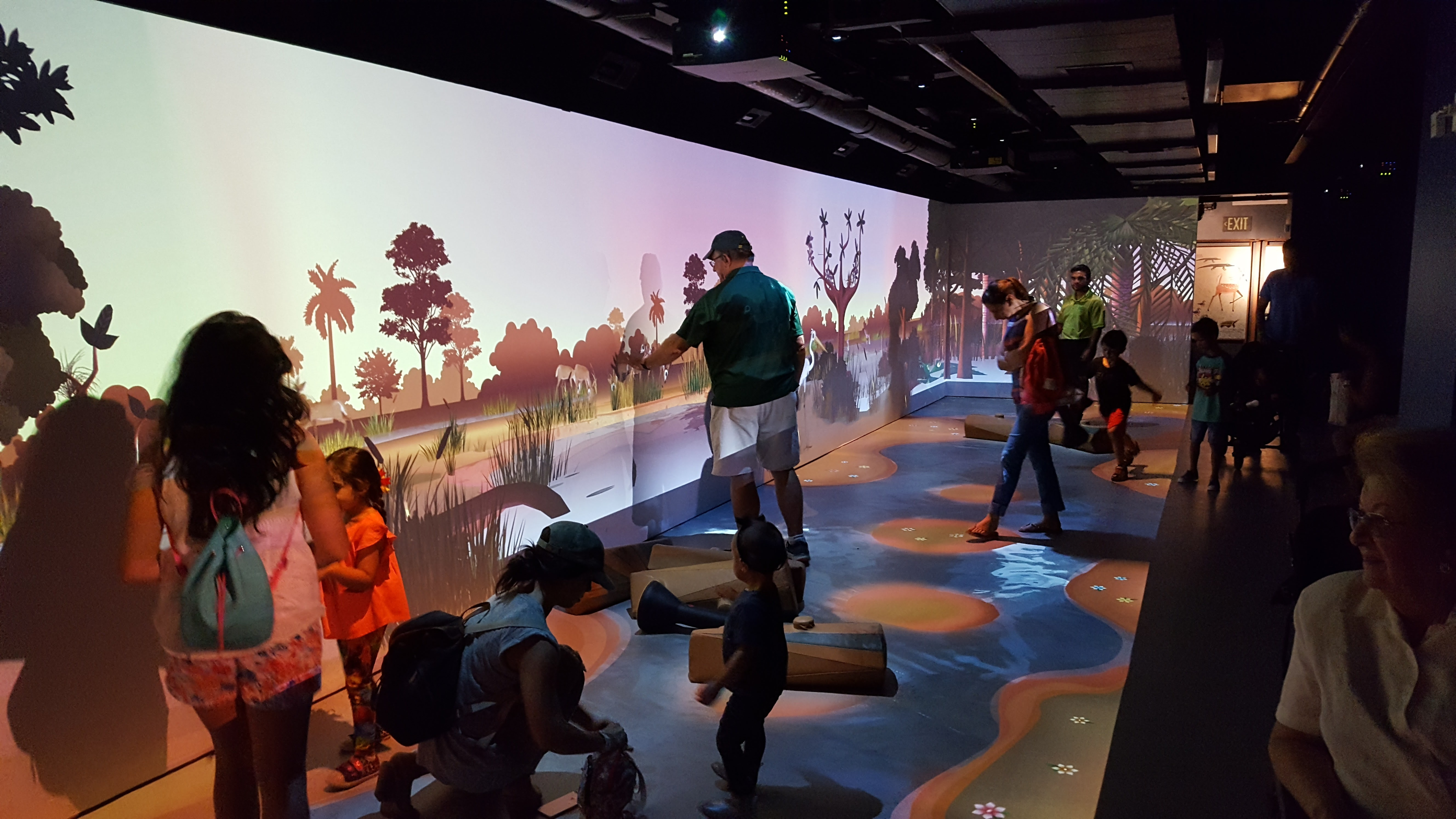
Interactive River Of Grass exhibit

The River of Grass is an interactive exhibit focused on the Everglades primarily for children. The exhibit consists of two spaces: an outdoor hands-on area, and an indoor virtual Everglades where animal characters interact with guests and teach them about concepts such as biodiversity using stories.

=== The Sun Spot ===
This exhibit teaches guests about solar power and the sun. This exhibition has six different exhibits showing different applications for solar power and different methods of utilizing it. The exhibit is located on the roof of the museum.

=== Temporary Displays ===
There is a large showroom near the entrance of the museum which can host many temporary events.

== See also ==
- List of Astronomical Observatories
- List of planetariums
- Star Gazers
