= National Register of Historic Places listings in Yonkers, New York =

Location of Yonkers in Westchester County

This is a list of the National Register of Historic Places entries in Yonkers, New York, United States. See also National Register of Historic Places listings in Westchester County, New York for all others in the county.

This is intended to be a complete list of properties and districts listed on the National Register of Historic Places in Yonkers, New York. The locations of National Register properties and districts (at least for all showing latitude and longitude coordinates below) may be seen in an online map by clicking on "Map of all coordinates".

This National Park Service list is complete through NPS recent listings posted December 12, 2025.

Contents: Counties in New York
Albany (Albany) – Allegany – Bronx – Broome – Cattaraugus – Cayuga – Chautauqua – Chemung – Chenango – Clinton – Columbia – Cortland – Delaware – Dutchess (Poughkeepsie, Rhinebeck) – Erie (Buffalo) – Essex – Franklin – Fulton – Genesee – Greene – Hamilton – Herkimer – Jefferson – Kings – Lewis – Livingston – Madison – Monroe (Rochester) – Montgomery – Nassau – New York (Below 14th Street, 14th to 59th Streets, 59th to 110th Streets, Above 110th Street, Islands) – Niagara (Niagara Falls) – Oneida – Onondaga (Syracuse) – Ontario – Orange – Orleans – Oswego – Otsego – Putnam – Queens – Rensselaer – Richmond – Rockland – St. Lawrence – Saratoga – Schenectady – Schoharie – Schuyler – Seneca – Steuben – Suffolk – Sullivan – Tioga – Tompkins – Ulster – Warren – Washington – Wayne – Westchester (Northern, Southern, New Rochelle, Peekskill, Yonkers) – Wyoming – Yates

== Current listings ==
	Name on the Register	Image	Date listed	Location	City or town	Description
1	Bell Place-Locust Avenue Historic District	Bell Place-Locust Avenue Historic District	August 29, 1985 (#85001936)	Roughly bounded by Cromwell Pl., Locust Hill Ave., Baldwin Pl. & N. Broadway; 40°56′09″N 73°53′49″W	Yonkers	
2	John Copcutt Mansion	John Copcutt Mansion	September 12, 1985 (#85002283)	239 Nepperhan Ave. 40°56′07″N 73°53′33″W	Yonkers	
3	Old Croton Aqueduct	Old Croton Aqueduct	December 2, 1974 (#74001324)	Runs N from Yonkers to New Croton Dam; 41°00′52″N 73°53′14″W	Yonkers	Extends into other parts of Westchester County.
4	Delavan Terrace Historic District	Delavan Terrace Historic District	September 15, 1983 (#83001827)	Roughly bounded by Delavan Terr. and Palisade and Park Aves. 40°57′00″N 73°53′33″W	Yonkers	Small residential street with homes of many important local residents in early 20th century
5	Ethan Flagg House-Blessed Sacrament Monastery	Ethan Flagg House-Blessed Sacrament Monastery	August 12, 1998 (#98001075)	23 Park Ave. 40°56′25″N 73°53′34″W	Yonkers	
6	Halcyon Place Historic District	Halcyon Place Historic District	January 11, 1991 (#90002145)	Halcyon Pl. 40°56′41″N 73°53′49″W	Yonkers	
7	Eleazer Hart House	Eleazer Hart House	July 29, 1982 (#82003417)	243 Bronxville Rd. 40°56′30″N 73°50′28″W	Southeast Yonkers (Cedar Knolls)	
8	Leffingwell–Batcheller House	Leffingwell–Batcheller House	February 23, 2015 (#15000036)	250 Palisade Ave. 40°56′31″N 73°53′33″W	Yonkers (Getty Square)	Large R. H. Robertson Queen Anne Style mansion from late 1880s
9	Metropolitan Life Insurance Company Hall of Records	Metropolitan Life Insurance Company Hall of Records	September 3, 2014 (#14000543)	759 Palmer Rd. 40°56′34″N 73°50′57″W	Yonkers	1906 neoclassical building is one of the earliest built by an insurance company to house archives
10	Mott Mill	Mott Mill	January 28, 2004 (#03001519)	11-23 St. Casimir Ave. 40°56′05″N 73°53′38″W	Yonkers (Getty Square)	
11	New York Central & Hudson River Railroad Power Station	New York Central & Hudson River Railroad Power Station	February 12, 2021 (#100006146)	45A Water Grant St. 40°57′05″N 73°53′58″W	Northwest Yonkers (Glenwood)	
12	Philipsburgh Building	Philipsburgh Building	May 22, 2002 (#02000552)	2-8 Hudson St. 40°55′59″N 73°54′00″W	Yonkers (Getty Square)	
13	Philipse Manor Hall	Philipse Manor Hall	October 15, 1966 (#66000585)	Warburton Ave. and Dock St. 40°56′08″N 73°53′58″W	Yonkers (Getty Square)	
14	Plashbourne Estate	Plashbourne Estate	August 2, 2007 (#07000777)	51 Carlton Rd. 40°56′20″N 73°50′52″W	Yonkers (Lawrence Park West)	
15	Proctor's Theater	Proctor's Theater	November 21, 2008 (#08001083)	53 S. Broadway; 40°55′48″N 73°53′59″W	Yonkers (Getty Square)	
16	Public Bath House No. 2	Public Bath House No. 2	October 21, 1985 (#85003365)	27 Vineyard Ave. 40°56′25″N 73°53′19″W	Yonkers	
17	Public Bath House No. 3	Public Bath House No. 3	October 21, 1985 (#85003366)	48 Yonkers Ave. 40°56′06″N 73°53′23″W	Yonkers (Getty Square and Nodine Hill)	
18	Public Bath House No. 4	Public Bath House No. 4	October 21, 1985 (#85003367)	138 Linden St. 40°55′51″N 73°53′33″W	Yonkers (Nodine Hill)	
19	Public School No. 13	Public School No. 13	April 18, 2007 (#07000332)	160 McLean Ave. 40°54′57″N 73°53′26″W	Yonkers (Park Hill)	
20	Sherwood House	Sherwood House	May 10, 1984 (#84003434)	340 Tuckahoe Rd. 40°57′07″N 73°51′19″W	Yonkers (CenTuck)	Now a house museum operated by the Yonkers Historical Society
21	Alexander Smith Carpet Mills Historic District	Alexander Smith Carpet Mills Historic District	August 11, 1983 (#83001832)	Roughly bounded by Saw Mill River Rd., Orchard St., Lake and Ashburton Aves. 40°56′33″N 73°53′01″W	Yonkers (Getty Square)	
22	St. John's Protestant Episcopal Church	St. John's Protestant Episcopal Church	July 29, 1982 (#82003418)	1 Hudson St. 40°56′01″N 73°53′56″W	Yonkers (Getty Square)	
23	W. B. Thompson Mansion	W. B. Thompson Mansion	October 29, 1982 (#82001277)	1061 N. Broadway; 40°58′20″N 73°53′05″W	Yonkers (Greystone)	1912 Renaissance Revival mansion is one of the few estates left in city from the early 20th century.
24	John Bond Trevor House	John Bond Trevor House	June 19, 1972 (#72000921)	511 Warburton Ave. 40°57′12″N 73°53′54″W	Yonkers (Glenwood)	Part of Hudson River Museum
25	Untermyer Park	Untermyer Park	May 31, 1974 (#74002263)	Warburton Ave. and N. Broadway S. of jct. with Odell Ave. 40°58′00″N 73°53′16″W	Yonkers (Greystone)	
26	US Post Office-Yonkers	US Post Office-Yonkers	May 11, 1989 (#88002448)	79-81 Main St. 40°56′05″N 73°54′08″W	Yonkers (Getty Square)	1927 stone building shows hints of Art Deco in its Classical Revival styling
27	Westminster Presbyterian Church		May 5, 2023 (#100008899)	76 Warburton Ave. 40°56′14″N 73°53′55″W	Yonkers (Getty Square)	
28	Yonkers Trolley Barn	Yonkers Trolley Barn	March 6, 2002 (#02000141)	92 Main St. 40°56′03″N 73°54′12″W	Yonkers (Getty Square)	1903 Renaissance Revival brick building is last remaining trolley barn in county. Was city offices afterward; now used as apartments.
29	Yonkers Water Works	Yonkers Water Works	July 21, 1982 (#82003419)	Properties on Saw Mill River Road, Tuckahoe Road, and at the Grassy Sprain Reservoir dam 40°57′29″N 73°51′33″W	Yonkers (CenTuck)	

== Former listings ==
	Name on the Register	Image	Date listed	Date removed	Location	City or town	Description
1	Edwin H. Armstrong House	Edwin H. Armstrong House	January 7, 1976 (#76001296)	March 5, 1986	1032 Warburton Ave.	Yonkers (Greystone)	

== See also ==
- National Register of Historic Places listings in southern Westchester County, New York
- National Register of Historic Places listings in New York
