= Nude swimming in US indoor pools =

Nudity in American public indoor pools

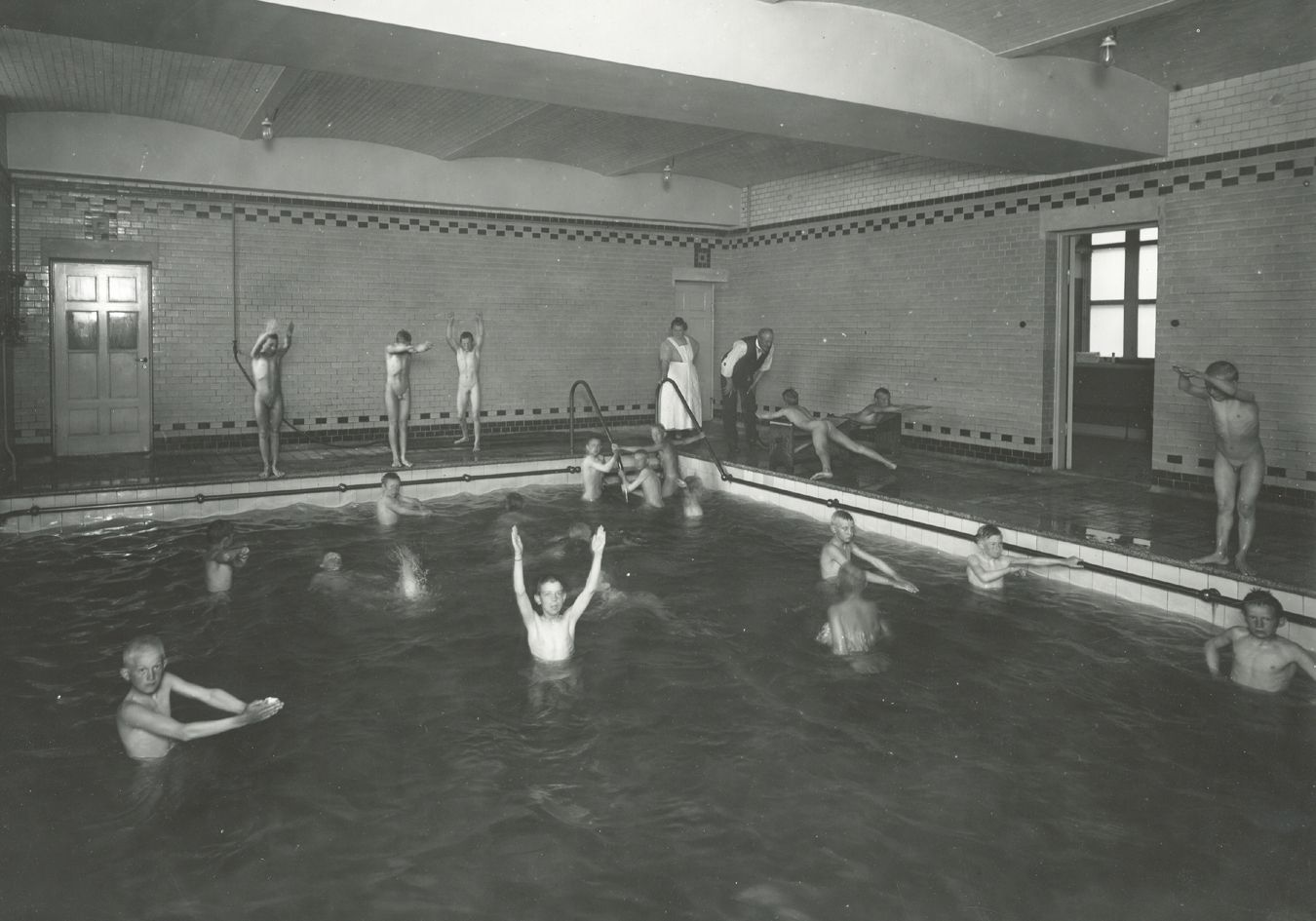
Man and woman teaching boys how to swim, 1902

Nude swimming in US indoor pools was common for men and boys from the late 1880s until the mid-1960s, declining until the end of the 80s. Male nude swimming outdoors had been customary in the early United States. In the 19th century, when urbanization made this "skinny-dipping" more publicly visible, indoor pools were built in part as a solution.

Nudity was rare in girls' swim classes because of the social norms of female modesty. Prepubescent boys might swim nude in the presence of female staff, family members, and spectators at public competitions.

The primary reason given by officials for nude swimming was public health, the technology for water purification being in development. Another reason was the clogging of pool filters by fibers shed by swimsuits with natural fabrics, most often wool. For male swimmers, both issues were easily addressed by forbidding swimsuits, while female swimmers wore cotton suits that could be steam-cleaned and shed fewer fibers. As the 20th century continued, more indoor pools were built by local governments, schools, and the YMCA to provide year-round swimming for exercise and sport.

During that period, public indoor pools were more prevalent in Midwest and Northeast states than in other areas of the country. Learn-to-swim programs were conducted in communities across the country to address the problem of drowning. Final sessions in these programs were sometimes open houses for families. On such occasions, younger swimmers might be nude while in the pool but wrap themselves in their towels otherwise, as shown in a newspaper photograph. In other locations, such as Massillon, Ohio boys were instructed to bring only towels for their lessons, but suits and towels for these open houses.

Male nude swimming in the US remained a common practice through the 1950s, but began to decline in the 1960s due to technological and social changes. In 1972, Title IX was passed; the law required gender equality in physical education. For swimming, coeducation became a solution to unequal access and facilities. This law did not take immediate effect due to uncertainty regarding policy, the Department of Education publishing clarification letters in later years.

== Origins of swimming pools ==
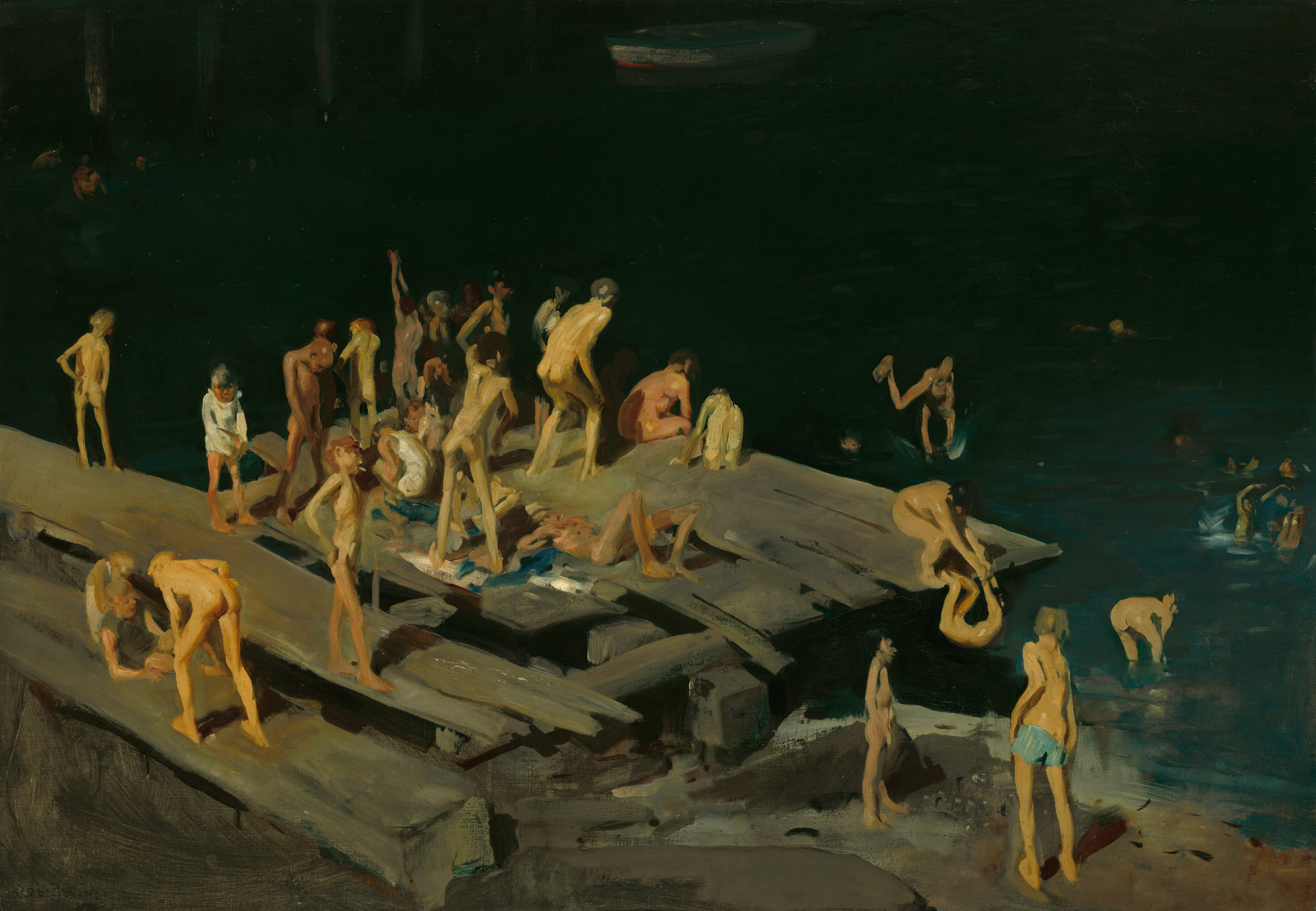
Forty-two Kids by George Bellows (1907) depicting boys swimming from a pier in the East River, New York City

The germ theory of disease replaced older theories of infection and illness during the 19th century in public awareness and medical practice. When the first pools were being built, the connection between cleanliness and health was just being made in public health policy and personal habits.

"Swimming baths" and pools were built in the late 19th century in poorer neighborhoods of northern industrial cities of the US to exert some control over a public swimming culture that offended Victorian sensibilities by including nakedness, roughhousing, and swearing. Such behavior had become an issue in the 18th century, but laws prohibiting public indecency had little effect. Naked swimmers from Milwaukee, Wisconsin, to New York City, primarily boys and young men, ignored the laws and sometimes flaunted themselves intentionally in view of more upper-class passers-by.

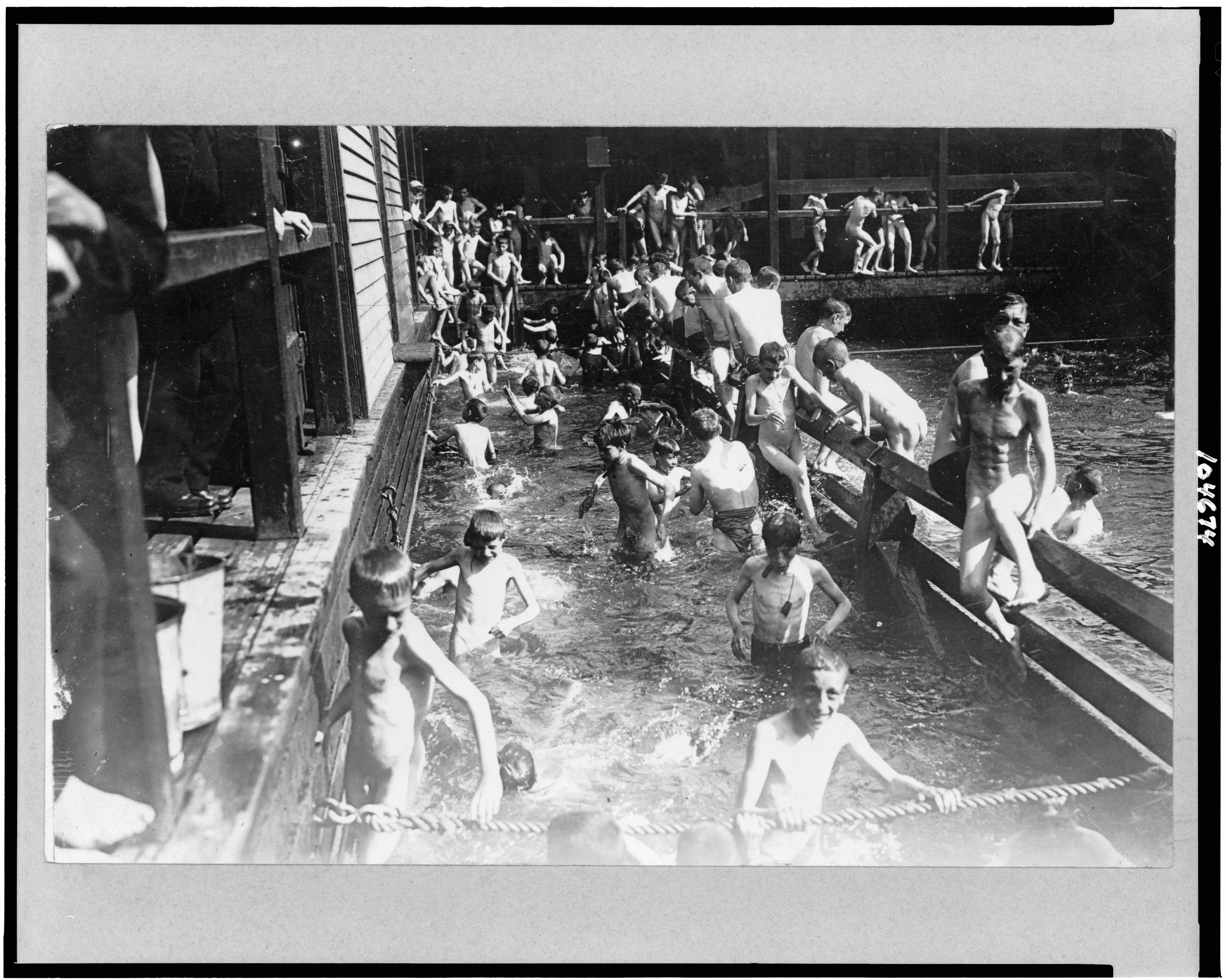
Floating bath at the Battery, New York City, 1908

Beginning in 1870, the first public swimming facilities in New York City were outdoor "floating baths" made of wood surrounded by docks that allowed river water to flow through them. In addition to health and hygiene, they were intended to prevent drowning in the open river, a frequent occurrence. As urban river water quality declined, floating baths became a source of infection. Building indoor pools and adding pools to bathhouses were done to address this problem. Since few swimmers in these neighborhoods could afford swimsuits or wanted to wear them, nudity among males was taken for granted.

Historian Jeff Wiltse writes that in cities such as Philadelphia, Boston, and Milwaukee during the Progressive Era (1896–1917), indoor and outdoor municipal pools were segregated by gender and class, but often not by race. In working-class neighborhoods, the white residents were mainly recent immigrants. The pools were for health and exercise, and used by male and female swimmers on alternate days. The outdoor pools were surrounded by a high wall to provide privacy. Women and girls wore bathing costumes; men and boys usually went without. The YMCA pools, which charged a fee and excluded women, were used by middle-class swimmers. The upper classes swam at private health clubs, which were also male-only.

At the beginning of the 20th century, nudity for the wealthiest men in New York City was the norm at the University Club, the Yale Club on Vanderbilt Avenue, the Racquet and Tennis Club and the New York Athletic Club on Central Park South. Nude swimming ended after a law was passed in the 1980s banning discrimination against women at private clubs. Nude swimming at the San Francisco Press Club was ended by a court order in 1988. In 1991, when there were only two women in the US Senate, they avoided the gym and the swimming pool where some of the male members continued to swim nude.

Mining companies provided housing for workers and their families, who shared a bathhouse with separate sections for men, women, and children, as they did not have private bathrooms at the turn of the 20th century. The bathhouse built by the Calumet and Hecla Mining Company in Michigan, which opened in 1910, included a swimming pool, as suggested by Progressive reformist literature. Men and boys swam without suits. Women and girls were allocated only 10 hours per week to use the pool, compared to 47 for men and 13 hours for boys. Children were defined as girls under 12 and boys under 10, who had to be accompanied by an adult female.

Indoor pools were most common in the Northeast and Midwest. In southern and western states, learn-to-swim programs popular in the 1940s were conducted in outdoor pools where all swimmers brought their own suits: Phoenix, Arizona (1940 and 1947); Miami, Florida (1947); Owensboro, Kentucky (1949); St. Louis, Missouri (1941 and 1949); Raleigh, North Carolina (1946) and Nashville, Tennessee (1941).

=== Public health recommendations ===
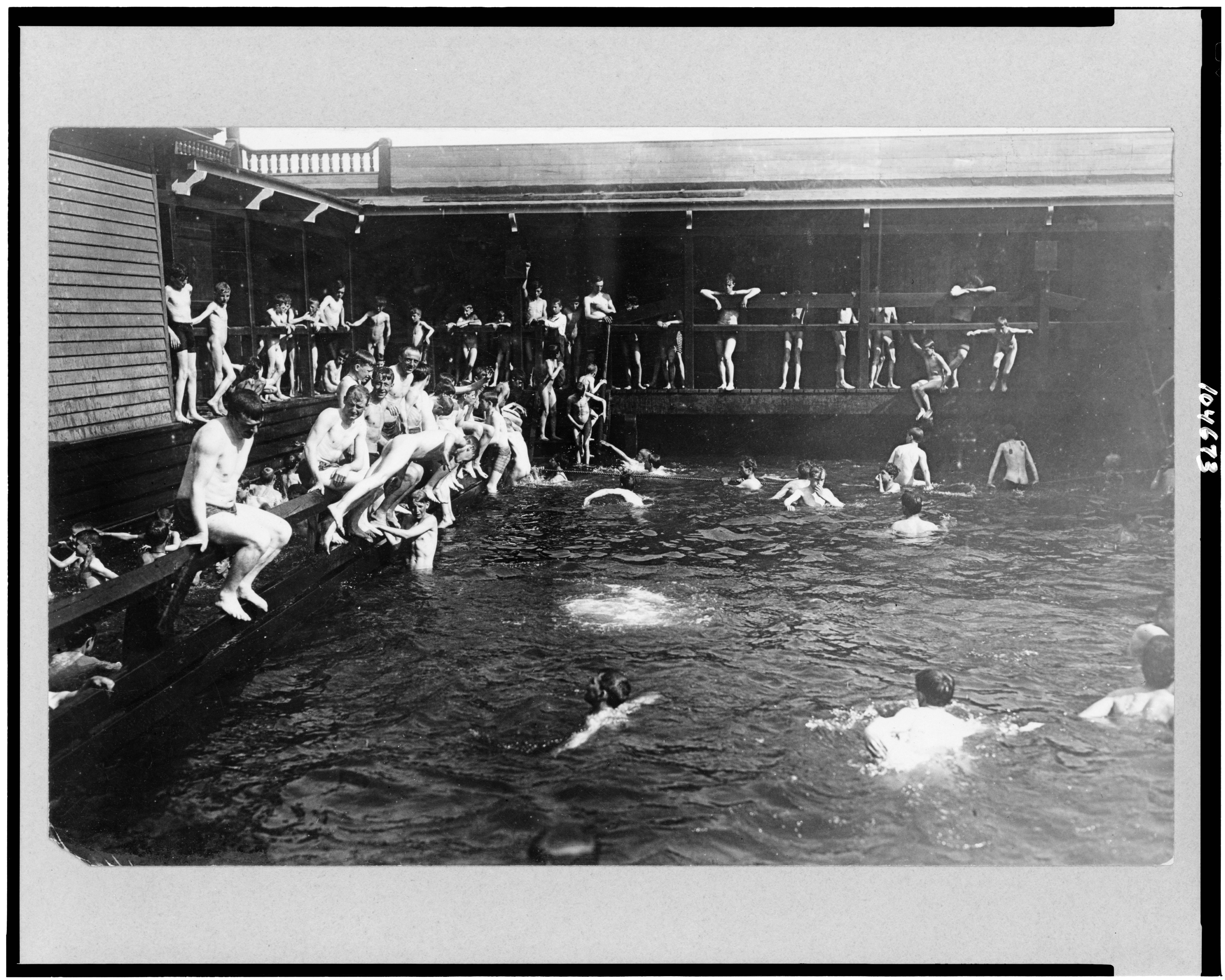
Swimming at the Battery, New York City, 1908

As early as 1914, professionals addressed the problem of maintaining pool water quality due to the prevalence of waterborne diseases, including typhoid, dysentery, pneumonia, and eye and ear infections. Initially, civil engineers recommended nudity in indoor pools for all swimmers, male and female, where such rules could be enforced. While this was generally accepted for men, it was true for only some pools when used by women. Fibers from suits clogging pool filters were also given as a reason for nudity. Fibers from wool suits were a greater problem, which was remedied by supplying cotton suits for use by female swimmers.

In the 1920s, close monitoring of swimmers in public pools was based upon their being from the working class, having generally poor hygiene, and often living in tenements with no bath facilities. Officially, municipal pools were built in working-class neighborhoods to provide such facilities, while YMCAs charged an entry or membership fee that excluded the lower classes, black and white. In 1926, the American Public Health Association (APHA) standards handbook recommended that indoor swimming pools used by men adopt nude bathing policies and that indoor swimming pools used by women require swimsuits "of the simplest type".

In 1939, the swimming coach and college athletics administrator Fred Luehring surveyed the issues and made similar recommendations, advising that men and boys should continue to swim nude, and tests of water quality showed the advantage over pools where suits are allowed. He noted the problem of water quality following pool use by female swimmers, not only due to suits being worn but their avoidance of taking a nude shower before entering the pool by showering in their suits.

In 1940, V. T. Trusler suggested that female swimmers be required to hang their suits over the door of shower stalls to prevent showering in them, and be inspected in order to avoid wearing undergarments with bathing suits. Suits for male swimmers were called unnecessary. The wool suits worn by male swimmers continued to be recognized as a source of water contamination. Cotton suits supplied by facilities for female swimmers were a lesser problem because they could be boiled to decontaminate them. Wool suits cannot be boiled or heated above 105 degrees Fahrenheit without shrinkage. Wool suits used in salt water cannot be washed effectively, as soap does not lather due to salt residue.

In 1941, reviewing the steps taken to maintain good hygiene in pools, H. W. Craig, supervisor of swimming at the University of Illinois, favored the continued conduct of physical education swimming programs for men not wearing suits, and for women using cotton suits supplied by the schools that could be steam cleaned. Problems arose when recreational swimmers used their own suits and avoided showering before entering the pool, which had become more frequent with the movement toward "corecreational" swimming.

From 1926 until 1962, every edition of the APHA guidelines recommended nude swimming for males.^{b} Given the limits of chlorination and filtration at that time, behavioral measures were also used to maintain water quality. In addition to recommending nudity, all bathers were required to empty their bladders and shower nude before entering the pool. Those suffering from skin or respiratory disease were prohibited from using the pool.

While finding the same public health issues, the National Environmental Health Association recommendations in 1956 included swimmers taking nude showers and wearing only suits laundered and sterilized by the facility, but not mandatory nude swimming.

Outside the United States during the same period, hygiene issues were recognized, but close supervision of swimmers and control of bathing suits could be an alternative to nudity. In Canada, public health recommendations allowed for suits, but nudity was recommended in pools used exclusively by men. A brochure sent to parents of children in the Toronto, Ontario, school system in 1963 stated that boys participating in the summer education program could swim in bathing trunks or nude. At YMCA pools in Ontario, nudity predominated from the 1960s to as late as the 1990s in some locations. A factor in the change was hiring women lifeguards for male classes. In England, it was recommended that suits for both men and women be inspected and stored by the facility.

== Racial segregation ==
During the interwar period, 1918–1939, when many more pools were constructed, public schools and recreation facilities were segregated in the United States, de jure until the passage of the Civil Rights Act of 1964, or de facto due to residential patterns. In some cities segregation was maintained by violence against black swimmers who attempted to enter pools.

Prior to the 1960s, the YMCA built separate facilities in black and white neighborhoods. The first black YMCA with a pool was the Twelfth Street YMCA in Washington, DC which was completed in 1912. Swimming nude was required, but did not appeal to all. In the 1940s, a Washington Evening Star article emphasized knowing how to swim being a defense asset as well as a safety measure, while also noting that "colored" boys could register at the 12th Street Y for their lessons rather than at the 1732 G Street YMCA, a block from the White House.

In Dayton, Ohio, 1940 all boys and girls age 11 to 14 who could not swim were eligible to take free lessons at the YMCA, YWCA, or Roosvelt High School; "Negro" children were assigned to classes at the Linden Community Center. In 1942 six agencies in Plainfield, New Jersey offered free swimming lessons at black and white branches of the YMCA and YWCA; the Jewish Community Center, and Watchung Lake. Suits were not required for men and boys at either YMCA. In a 1944 article citing the history and benefits of the YMCA programs for all, photographs showed the separate swimming classes for black and white boys, without suits.

In spite of the Civil Rights Act, a summer camp in Montgomery, Alabama hosted by the YMCA refused entry to two black children in 1969, resulting in a landmark desegregation decision which included the YMCA as a public accommodation. Across the south, municipalities closed recreational facilities rather than integrate them. Some public pools were transferred to private ownership, and re-opened as segregated facilities.

== YMCA/YWCA ==
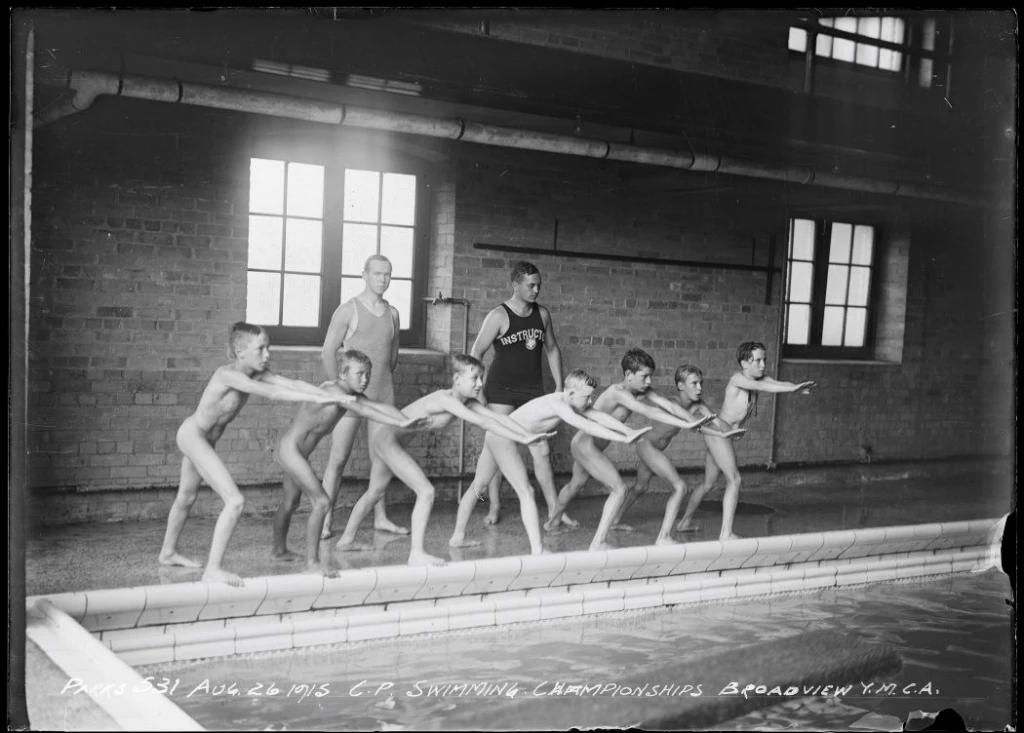
A swim lesson in a YMCA, 1915

The Young Men's Christian Association (YMCA) and Young Women's Christian Association (YWCA) were founded in London, England in 1844 and 1855, respectively. Although not formally connected, in the 20th century they had similar missions, sometimes coordinating their programs. There were also differences, in particular the YWCA's greater recognition of sexual and racial equality.

The first YMCA indoor pool in the United States was built in 1885, in Brooklyn, New York. Male nudity was required at YMCA pools in both the US and Canada until they became mixed-gender in the 1970s. The downtown Miami YMCA, built in 1918 and demolished in 1978, featured what was considered a modern swimming pool at the time. While noting the filtration system made the pool water clean enough to drink, nudity is shown in a promotional photograph from the 1930s.

In 1955 a graduate student in education at Boston University conducted a survey of 100 boys age 11 to 13 who had dropped their YMCA membership. Statistics had shown that this age group had the highest dropout rate, and the research was to discover the cause. Given their age, responses to a questionnaire were collected in an interview. Since swimming was the reason most often stated for joining the YMCA, except for having friends that were also members, significance was assumed regarding questions about swimming, in particular doing so without suits. Of the 100, 35 said they would prefer to swim in suits, but 65 said they would not prefer suits. Sanitation, the simplicity of needing to bring only a towel for swim class, and less problem with lint and dirt were given as reasons to swim nude, but also the psychological value of boys seeing they are physically normal. Many reasons were given for not continuing their YMCA membership, but issues regarding swimming were not high.

The first YWCA in the US, built in 1877, included gymnastics among its programs, which was criticized by outside educators, who favored only formal education for women. The first swimming pools in YWCAs were built in 1905 in Buffalo, New York and Montgomery, Alabama. A pool soon became standard in city YWCA buildings. The suits used by women at the YWCA pools until 1930 were not the undyed cotton recommended by public health officials, but the same black wool bathing costumes worn by women at beaches.

=== Learn to swim programs at the 'Y' ===
Announcements of YMCA learn-to-swim programs published in local newspapers across the country generally noted that boys should bring only a towel, while girls were required to also bring a suit or use one provided by the facility, as indicated by the instances below.

In 1930, the Tribune newspaper in Pocatello, Idaho sponsored 'learn to swim' classes at the YMCA, announcing that girls must bring towels and suits, boys only towels. A Madison, Wisconsin swim meet held at the 'Y' in 1931 did not allow suits or spectators. In May 1936 the Charleston, West Virginia YMCA announced its tenth annual "Learn to Swim" program for boys age 8 to 15 not able to swim, noting bathing suits not being required. The YMCA in Wichita, Kansas was used in 1937 for a 'learn to swim' campaign. In a 1937 national survey of intermediate swimming programs in YMCAs, it was noted that among the health control methods, the management of suits was given a low priority due to the number of classes that swim without suits. The June 1937 'Swim Week' in Lincoln, Nebraska was offered at four pools for different groups by gender and age; the YMCA sessions for boys and men not requiring suits. The YMCA in Emporia, Kansas was used for a 1939 children's 'learn to swim' campaign. The announcement in June 1940 for classes at the YMCA in Appleton, Wisconsin for boys and girls age 10 to 17 mentioned only bringing a towel and soap.

In Benton Harbor, Michigan local newspapers in June 1941 sponsored a course at the "Y" for men over 18 that could not swim, noting in the announcement that no suits were required. Also in Benton Harbor, programs for children in 1943 and 1945 announced that girls should bring a suit and towel, boys only a towel. In 1949 classes had become mixed-gender, so suits were worn. In 1941 the "Y" swim classes in Madison, Wisconsin were co-sponsored by the Wisconsin State Journal and praised by mayor James R. Law Jr. After noting that swimming suits would not be used, parents were invited to a final session at which boys would be awarded YMCA buttons and certificates after passing a swim test. The learn-to-swim classes at the YMCA in Marion, Ohio in 1942 was also announced with the message that girls should bring a suit and towel, boys only a towel.

Unlike other states, the swimming programs in 1940 and 1941 operated by the Red Cross using YWCA pools in Salt Lake City, Utah specified that both boys and girls should bring their own suits. However, when the Red Cross offered a "Swim for Health Week" for both men and women at a YMCA pool in Berkeley, California in 1943, women were asked to bring a towel and suit, men only a towel.

At the YMCA in the South End of Chicago in 1944, a summer program for boys and girls had classes for 500 students in half-hour sessions separated by sex and age. Fridays were family night for adults to see the student's accomplishments. In Tucson, Arizona the YMCA pool was used in 1945 to teach any boy unable to swim, and in 1946 boys age 9 through junior high; suits were not worn. Free YMCA classes in Franklin, Pennsylvania were for both boys and girls in 1945, only the girls being asked to bring suits. The enrollment for boys 7 to 14 for a swim class at the Cedar Rapids, Iowa "Y" after summer 1947 bible school sessions were explicit that "No suit required". The instructions for the YMCA swim school in Davenport, Iowa in 1949 was that each boy bring a towel, but "suits are not necessary".

Swimming classes for women and girls (in swimsuits) were held at YWCAs, sometimes in coordination with YMCA classes in the same locality. The 1948 registration blank for the annual swim program for non-swimmers in Lincoln, Nebraska emphasized that girls should bring a towel but not their own suits, but rent suits at the YWCA. Boys should bring a towel but no suit for their YMCA classes. The learn-to-swim program continued in Lincoln for a decade. Coordinated YMCA/YWCA classes were also held in Washington, Iowa in 1948, again all were asked to bring towels, only girls to bring suits, except for parents night, when boys should also bring suits.

Swim classes at the YMCA for boys continued into the 1950s, as in Steubenville, Ohio. A photograph publicizing the learn-to-swim program in Wilkes-Barre, Pennsylvania in 1950 was captioned "In order to have thorough sanitation, swim suits are not used by swimmers in the YMCA pool. This accounts for the drapery of towels when the picture was taken." In 1955 the creation of a league of four teams for 8 to 10-year-old boys in York, Pennsylvania was announced. The swim meet spectators were limited to male only. In 1956, the Tucson Arizona YMCA announced its 36th annual Learn to Swim campaign for boys age 9-14, with the note "suits are not worn".

As the century continued, changes occurred in particular locations. The Central YMCA in Norfolk, Virginia made suits optional in 1953. In 1958 suits being worn by male swimmers became the policy at the YMCA in Grand Rapids, Michigan. Officials cited the general improvement of public health and suits being made of easy to clean synthetic fabrics as reasons for the change. An additional benefit in favor of the change was that it allowed open access to family spectators. In 1960, some of the swimming events for boys at the Y in Waterloo, Iowa swim suits were optional. At some YMCAs, attempts were made to retain male nudity by restricting women's pool access to certain hours; in documented cases, such arrangements were challenged as discriminatory given women's full membership status.

== Boys' clubs ==
A 1940 article in LIFE magazine describes the pool in the Olneyville Boys' Club as providing an alternative to juvenile delinquency in a declining mill neighborhood. Photos show the naked boys crowded into the "dingy little 60 ft. swimming pool" as they had for fifteen years. In 1941, the Olneyville Club won two of the five final events at a national Boys Club of America swimming championship. Following a 1954 cattle judging contest in Wichita Falls, Texas, boys participating were invited to the Wichita Falls Boys Club for a free swim party, no swim suits being needed.

== Public schools ==
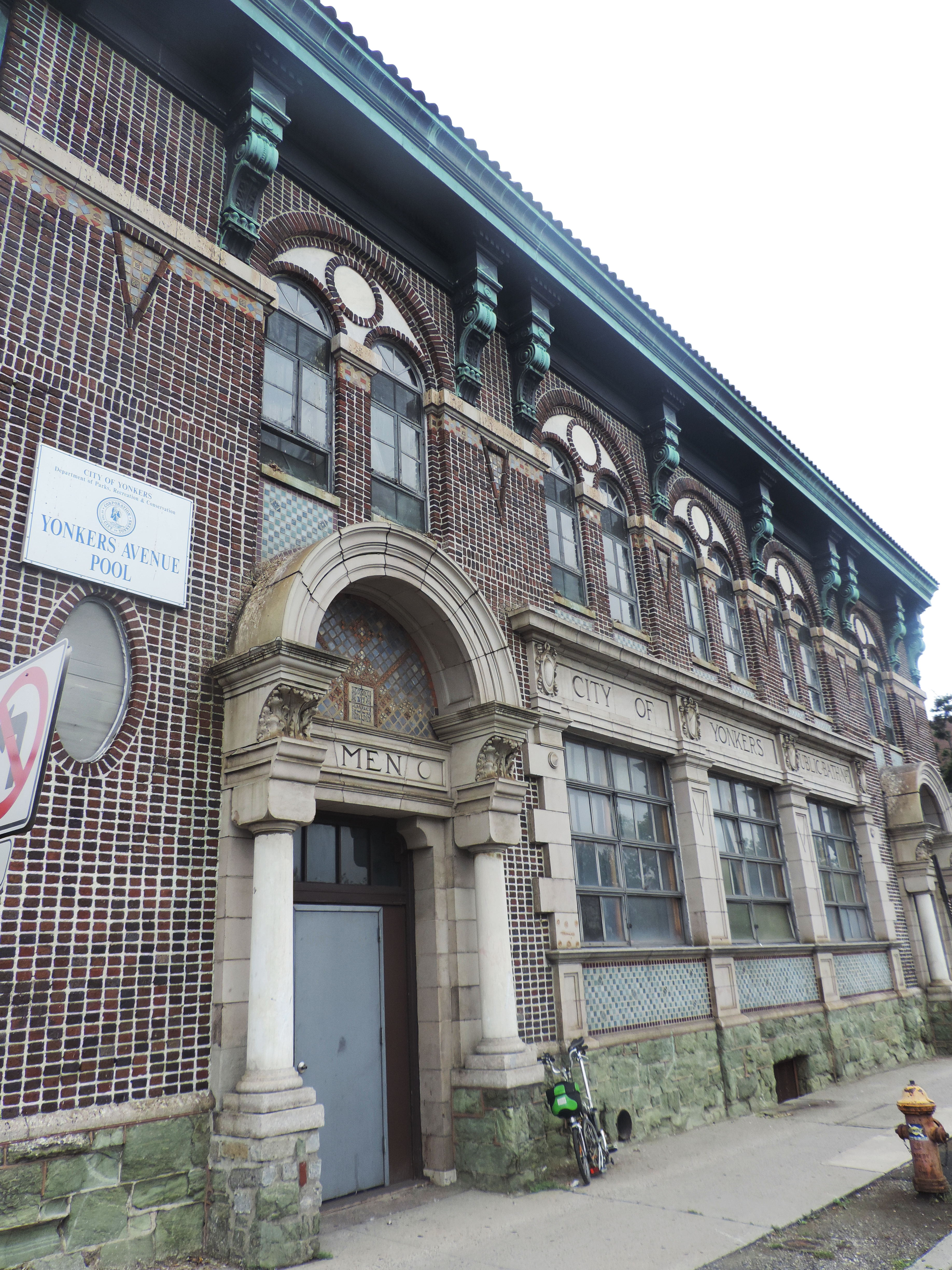
Public Bath House No. 3 built 1909 in Yonkers, New York

The 1909 elementary school swimming championship for New York City included nearly forty schools in Manhattan, the Bronx, and Brooklyn; and was held at what was then called the Interior Public Bath,^{a} the first municipal indoor swimming pool built in New York City.

The athletic prowess of the very small boys in the eighty-pound championship was of less moment to the spectators than the enthusiasm of the youngsters, who discovered in their trial heats that their swimming trunks impeded them, and that they could swim faster nude. Thereafter the rule about trunks went into the discard, and very small boys in a state of nature swam like tadpoles through the many heats necessary for a decision.

— New York Times

In the 1920s, schools began building indoor swimming pools for purposes of physical fitness and swimming instruction. In 1900, there were only 67 public pools in the United States; by 1929 there were more than 5,000. Due to hot weather, the Englewood High pool in New Jersey was open to the public one day per week in July 1926. The announcement emphasized the observance of public health recommendations, all swimmers required to take a soap shower before entering the pool. No mixed bathing was permitted, suits were not allowed for men and boys, while women and girls wore the standard Y.W.C.A. suit. A November 1926 newspaper article announced the schedule for swim classes held in the evening at the community center in Ironwood, Michigan for students in grades 7-12. It was explicit that boys would not be permitted to wear suits, and would be supervised to ensure a shower was taken and that there was no sign of disease. Girls were required to wear suits, and it was noted that all instructors were also. Instructors were also required to notify the school of their absence, so that a replacement could be found, indicating that the female instructor might substitute for the male class.

In 1934 a survey of schools in California, some allowed boys to swim nude or with athletic supporters, others supplied suits to boys as they did for all girls. In 1935 the school superintendent in Pontiac, Michigan approved nude swim classes for boys in high school, saying it recalled "the days of the old swimming hole". A thesis on high school swimming in Indiana in 1939 found only 16 pools in 848 schools, in which all of the boys swam without suits. Although some advantages in coeducational swim classes were recognized as early as 1934, the need to maintain pool water quality by insuring cleanliness of both swimmers and swimsuits dictated separate boys and girls classes and the banning of wool suits. Few pools had been constructed for coeducation, having a single shower room. In a survey of Indiana high schools in 1939, all boys swim classes were nude, while girls wore suits, 87% being cotton suits issued by the school.

In 1940 a New York City school official continued to favor boys wearing bathing suits only in pools visible to both sexes. Girls were issued cotton suits that could be boiled to disinfect them between uses; the wool suits used by boys could not because they would shrink and lose their shape. In addition, fibers from wool swimsuits could clog pool filters. Swim classes were advocated not only for exercise, but as a recreational activity that, once learned, could become a lifelong pursuit. The swim classes were also looked upon as an opportunity to teach children proper hygiene. Students bringing their own suits was discouraged, the institutions not having control of decontamination. A 1947 survey of schools in northern Utah found more local variation. Only three of the six schools had pools. One allowed swimmers to wear their own suits, one supplied cotton suits. At the one that required nudity, the athletic director cited the problem of lint from suits clogging the pool filter.

The October 16, 1950 Life magazine published a photograph of boys swimming together in the indoor pool of New Trier High School in Winnetka, Illinois; the caption did not mention they were naked. A southern city with indoor pools in the junior and senior high schools is Houston, Texas, which required nudity until the mid-1960s. While some former students in 2008 remembered the experience as negative, mainly due to bullying, older men who had attended 30 years earlier had no problem, citing different attitudes regarding privacy before WWII.

In 1960 school officials and parents began questioning nude swimming in North Tonawanda, New York, where it had been the practice at the high school for 30 years. Rather than a ban on nudity, suits were made optional by a 4–1 vote of the school board.Alpena High School (Michigan) adopted a policy of swimsuits being optional for boys when it opened in 1962, noting that nudity for boys remained the general policy throughout the state. In a 1962 Houston Chronicle column of reader comments, six boys indicated discomfort regarding swimming nude at Waltrip High School. The school principle replied that suits may be worn by boys, but there had never been any prior objections to the nudity policy. In 1963, as it had for 33 years, the city of Troy, New York continued its mandatory citywide program of swim classes for all students in grades 4-8 and 9–12; boys swimming nude. A letter to parents emphasized the importance of learning at least the basics of swimming for survival in an emergency.

=== Girls' classes ===
In 1939 one book on public health did agree that nudity would be the most sanitary option for girls as well as boys, and that this was practiced at some schools, but never widespread as with boys. In 1947 the 150 girls age 9 to 13 at the Liberty School in Highland Park, Michigan were directed to wear swimsuits by the Superintendent of Schools in response to a group of mothers protesting to the board of education. Nude swimming for girls had been optional for six weeks prior to the order. Nude swim classes continued for the 200 elementary school girls from two other schools. Boys in the schools had not worn suits in their separate classes for years, and girls requested to do the same in order to give them more time in the pool rather than changing. While following the wishes of parents who believed girls should behave modestly, all the board members disagreed, stating that there was "no moral issue involved".

== Other programs for young people ==
The Iowa State College pool in Ames, Iowa was used for children's swim classes in the summer of 1939, noting that boys do not wear suits for their morning classes. At men's general swimming sessions in the evenings for students and faculty, suit were not worn.

In the summers of 1944 and 1945, the Chicago Parks offered a summer swimming program for children, boys on Monday and Tuesday and Wednesday, girls on Thursday and Friday. In two high schools' indoor pools, girls were required to bring a suit, but boys swam without.

The Tamalpais High School pool in Mill Valley, California was open to the public three days per week in the summer of 1944. During the days when boys swam in the morning, girls and women in the afternoon, the boys did not wear suits. Boys under 7 were allowed to come to the afternoon sessions with their mothers, but had to bring suits. The University of Oklahoma pool in Norman, Oklahoma was used for summer swim programs, with separate classes for cub scouts and boy scouts. In 1951 the new pool in Marysville High School was opened to grade school students on Saturday. Boys were allowed to wear a swimsuit if they wanted, but wool suits were not allowed. In 1958 the announcement included only the need to bring a towel. In 1961, listed among the attendees for the cub scout sessions were two den mothers.

The Sheboygan, Wisconsin Department of Public Recreation held "Learn to Swim" classes for middle school children at the Central High School pool. The classes were held on Saturday morning during the school year, Monday through Friday mornings in summer. Among the earliest newspaper announcements of the classes, in 1926 the article ended by saying "there will be no restrictions on swimming suits." In 1930, the announcement more clearly states that girls would be issued suits and towels, boys only towels. The news article in 1940 includes two photographs, one of a girl's class posing in their suits, the other of the boy's class, all nude, watching one student demonstrating a dive.

Through the 1950s until 1960, the Sheboygan Press published the schedules of the separate classes for boys and girls, noting that girls would be issued suits, but boys would be nude. A longer article in 1954 included details on the conduct of classes. There were an equal number of boys and girls, 404 in total, age 10 to 14 and divided into 14 half-hour classes each day. There were four teachers, three men and one woman, plus two female locker room attendants. "Boys swim unhampered by suits and bring only a towel as their contribution each afternoon. Girls bring their own bathing caps and are supplied with suits, for the morning workout". All swimmers were required to take a soap shower nude before entering the pool. The final class was designated visitor's day, with no mention of boys needing suits. A similar article in 1957 by the same author noted the capacity crowd of mothers and fathers in the pool balcony as indicating support for the program. After 1960, all students in the summer program were required to bring their own suits because mixed-sex recreational sessions had been added to the schedule. However, boys continued to swim without suits at the Recreation Department swimming program during the school year. Waukesha, Wisconsin also conducted classes for children, with boys nude and girls provided suits. The courses included Red Cross certification.

== Colleges and universities ==
In 1920, a review of swimming pools found similar concerns for hygiene at the collegiate level. "In men's pools, where bathing suits are not ordinarily worn," inspection of swimmers was done by attendants to see that a thorough preliminary shower was taken. A thesis done in 1955 included a survey of colleges and universities in the United States that found a nearly even split between institutions where men in swim classes wore suits versus those where swimmers were nude. However, there were regional differences, 68.5% of schools in the Midwest and 70% in the East being nude, while suits were worn more often in the South (63.2%), Southwest (60%) and West (62.5%).

Colleges for men, such as those operated by the Jesuits, ended nude swimming when they admitted women in the late 1960s and early 1970s. Public universities, such as the University of Wisconsin–Madison, Iowa State University and the University of Maryland required nudity for male swimmers until the 1970s.

== Questioning and decline of nudity ==
New developments in pool chlorination, filtration, and nylon swimsuits led to the gradual elimination of nudity from recommendations for pool sanitation. Swimsuits for boys were sometimes optional. The APHA abandoned its recommendation of nude swimming for males in 1962. However, the custom did not immediately cease, the rationale switching from hygiene to the cost savings and maintaining a tradition of male behavior.

In 1961, some parents in Menasha, Wisconsin asked the school board to give boys permission to wear swim trunks, asserting psychological issues for the youngest boys. The board voted down a petition signed by 371 parents on the grounds that buying swim trunks would be expensive and that nude swimming built men's character; one board member asserted that "this experience is a good one for later life, for example the armed services, where the disregard for privacy is real and serious". Another board member noted that swimmers had no privacy in the gang showers required for the classes. A letter from the Department of Public Education stated that nudity for boys was practiced throughout the state to promote sanitation and to save time. A survey of other schools found suits were worn only at schools where the pool was not completely separate from other areas.

In Janesville, Wisconsin nude swimming became an issue at Marshall Junior High in 1967 in part because boys at nearby Franklin Junior High wore suits, their pool having outside windows. The boys at Franklin were issued nylon suits, as were the girls at both schools. One coach noted that boys being from different backgrounds and being at different stages of maturity, some found nudity embarrassing, while others took it for granted. Parents, physicians, and clergy voiced various positions pro and con. The deciding factor was again the cost of purchasing suits for all boys. By 1976, suits had become optional, but most students chose to do without at Marshall and Craig High School, the only schools without open observation areas.

In 1966 and 1967, the Manitowoc, Wisconsin Recreation Department held evening recreational swimming utilizing school pools, families on Tuesdays, women on Wednesdays. On Thursdays, part of the session was for fathers and sons, while the final hour was for men only. Women were supplied suits if they did not bring their own; for men and boys, suits were "permitted...those wishing to wear trunks must bring their own". Children's classes were on Saturday mornings, with separate sessions by age and sex. Only girls were required to bring a suit.

In a 1973 Duluth, Minnesota school board meeting, a discussion of "skinny-dipping" in the boys junior high school swim classes following complaints from parents who cited modesty according to the supervisor of physical education. A school board member called this false modesty in a gym class where students must shower nude. For the board, the issue was the $12,000 needed to buy suits for 2500 students in the district.

Federal Title IX rules mandating gender equality in physical education adding to the trend for elimination of male nudity. In the 21st century, the practice has been forgotten, denied having existed, or viewed as an example of questionable behaviors in the past that are no longer acceptable.

However, Jungian psychoanalyst Barry Miller views the sexualization of nudity in male only situations such as locker rooms and swimming pools as a loss.

The decline in swimming programs at the collegiate level is also seen as part of a general tendency to favor profit-earning sports such as football and basketball.

== Notes ==
a.Located at 232 West 60th Street, Manhattan, Interior Public Bath had been built in 1906. In 2013 the West 60th Street bath building reopened after extensive renovations as the Gertrude Ederle Recreation Center.
b.Alternatives to nudity might be an athletic supporter or gym shorts.
