= Edwin H. Armstrong House =

- Formerly listed on the U.S. National Register of Historic Places
- Former U.S. National Historic Landmark
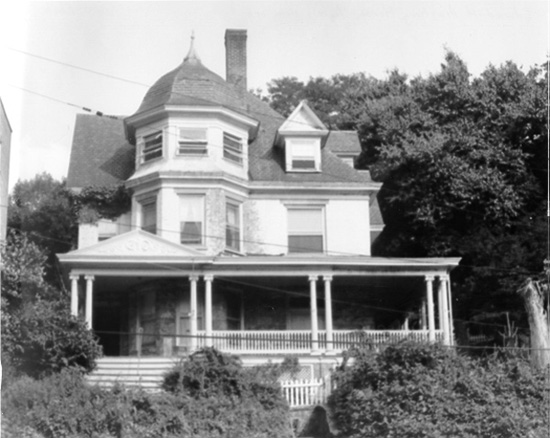
- Standing, circa 1975

- Location within New York Location within the United States
- Location: 1032 Warburton Ave, Yonkers, New York
- Coordinates: 40°58′15.61″N 73°53′19.66″W
- Built: 1902
- Architectural style: Queen Anne style architecture in the United States
- NRHP reference No.: 76001296

Significant dates
- Added to NRHP: January 7, 1976
- Designated NHL: January 7, 1976
- Removed from NRHP: March 5, 1986
- Delisted NHL: March 5, 1986

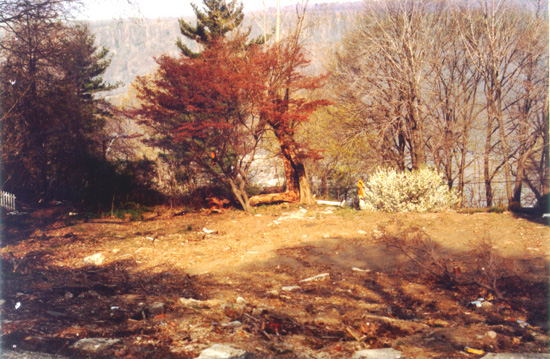
Demolished, 1983

The Edwin H. Armstrong House was a Queen Anne style house at 1032 Warburton Avenue in Yonkers in Westchester County, New York, United States. It was the home of Edwin H. Armstrong, inventor of two circuits that are the basis of modern telecommunication systems, and also inventor of wide-band frequency modulation (FM) radio.

It was added to the National Register of Historic Places (NRHP) as a National Historic Landmark on January 7, 1976. It was demolished in 1983 after suffering fire damage. It was subsequently de-designated as a National Historic Landmark and delisted from the NRHP in 1986. Its removal from National Historic Landmark status is the only such occurrence for a New York State site.

== See also ==
- List of National Historic Landmarks in New York
- National Register of Historic Places listings in Yonkers, New York
