= Yonkers Water Works =

- U.S. National Register of Historic Places
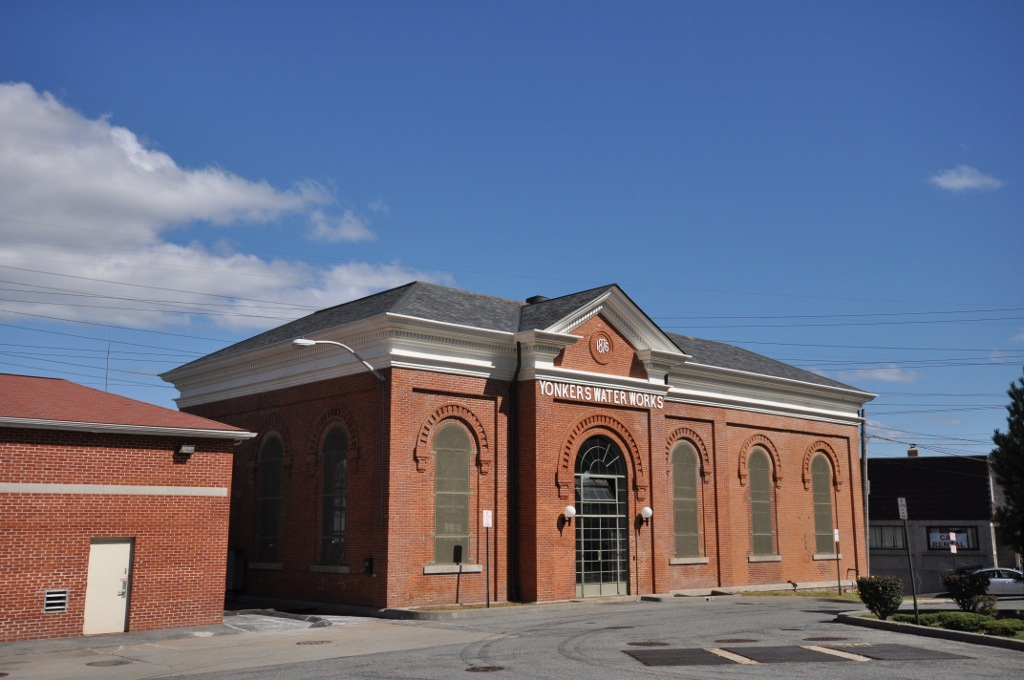
- The pumping station on Tuckahoe Rd.

- Location within New York Location within the United States
- Location: Properties on Saw Mill River Road, Tuckahoe Road, and at the Grassy Sprain Reservoir Dam, Yonkers, New York
- Coordinates: 40°57′12″N 73°51′23″W
- Area: less than one acre
- Built: 1876, 1898
- Architectural style: Late Victorian, High Victorian
- NRHP reference No.: 82003419
- Added to NRHP: July 21, 1982

Yonkers Water Works is a historic public water works located at Yonkers, Westchester County, New York. Three buildings remain extant; two were built in 1876 and one in 1898. They are reflective of the High Victorian style. The Tuckahoe Road Pumping Station was built in 1876 and expanded before 1900. The original section is three bays wide and three bays deep with a central projecting pavilion and pedimented gable roof. The gatehouse at Grassy Sprain Reservoir was also constructed in 1876. It is a small, one story masonry building on a high granite foundation. The Tubewell Station was built in 1898 and expanded in 1922. It is a red brick building, one and one half stories high and five bays wide and 13 bays deep.

It was added to the National Register of Historic Places in 1982.

== See also ==
- Water supply infrastructure on the National Register of Historic Places
