= Public Bath House No. 2 =

- U.S. National Register of Historic Places
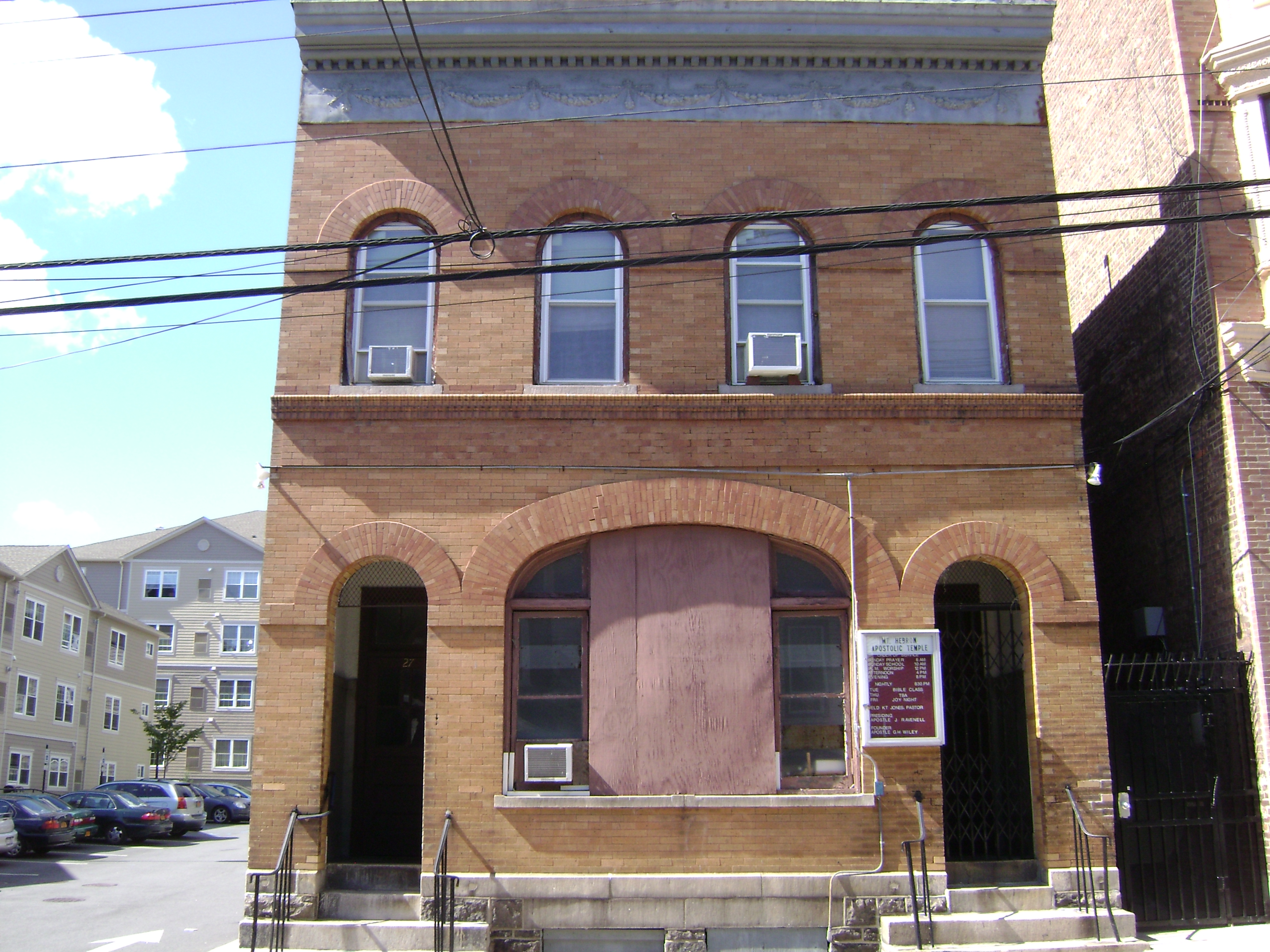
- The entrance to Yonkers Public Bath House #2

- Location within New York Location within the United States
- Location: 27 Vineyard Ave., Yonkers, New York
- Coordinates: 40°56′26″N 73°53′16″W
- Area: 0.1 acres (0.040 ha)
- Built: 1898
- Architectural style: Romanesque
- MPS: Yonkers Public Bath House TR
- NRHP reference No.: 85003365
- Added to NRHP: October 21, 1985

Public Bath House No. 2 is a historic public bath located at Yonkers, Westchester County, New York. It was built in 1898 and is a two-story, three-bay wide building built of yellowish-orange brick in the Romanesque style. It features a wide, centrally placed segmental-arched window. The interior was in three sections: the reception area, the custodian's apartment, and the baths. It was modernized in 1928 and decommissions, gutted, and rebuilt as a church in 1962. As of January 2011, it was home to the Mt. Hebron Apostolic Church.

It was added to the National Register of Historic Places in 1985.
