= Halcyon Place Historic District =

Historic district in New York, United States

- U.S. National Register of Historic Places
- U.S. Historic district
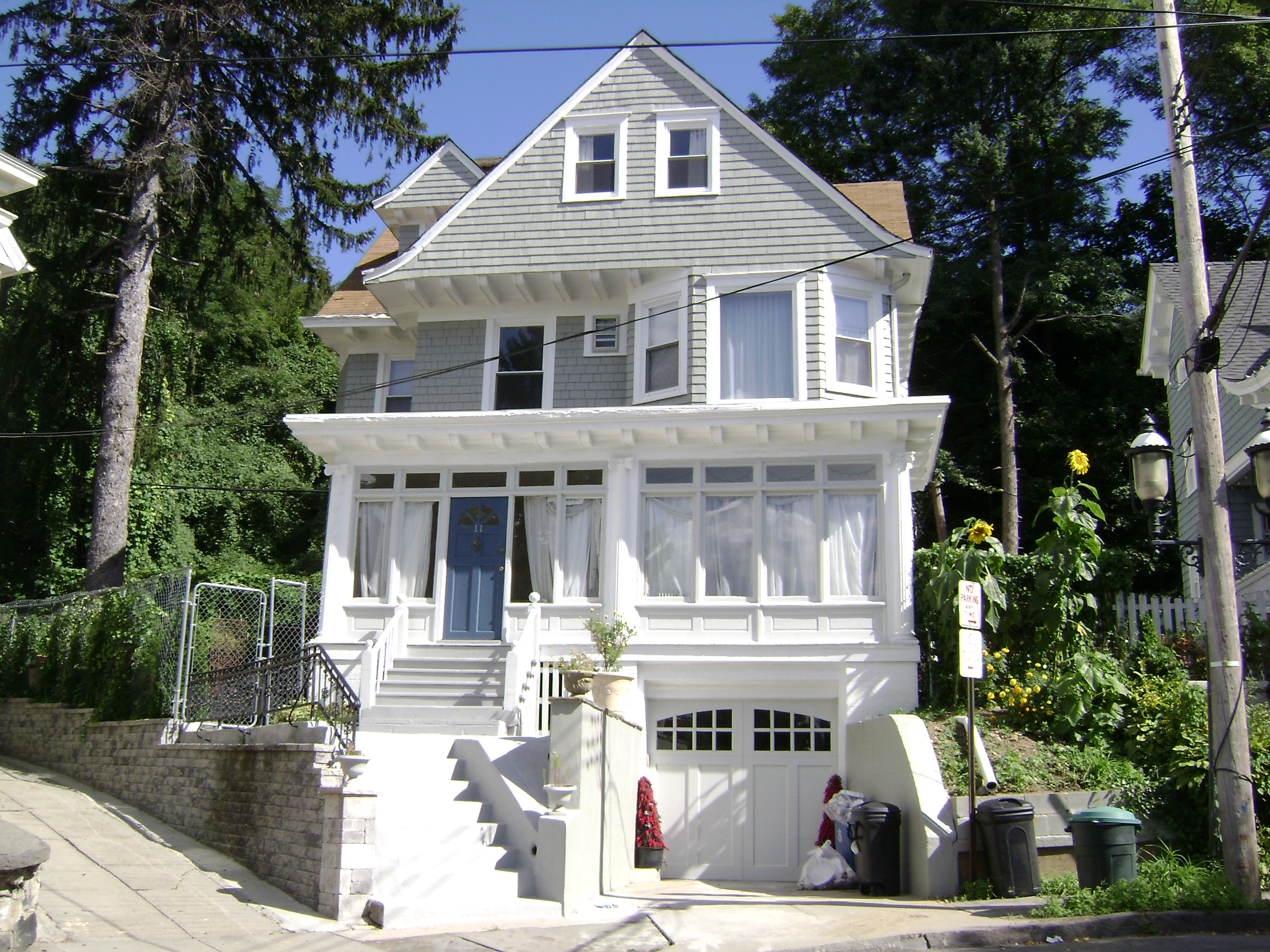

- Location within New York Location within the United States
- Location: Halcyon Pl., Yonkers, New York
- Coordinates: 40°56′41″N 73°53′49″W
- Area: 1.5 acres (0.61 ha)
- Architect: Multiple
- Architectural style: Classical Revival, Late Victorian, Mission/Spanish Revival
- NRHP reference No.: 90002145
- Added to NRHP: January 11, 1991

Halcyon Place Historic District is a national historic district located at Yonkers, Westchester County, New York. It includes 12 contributing buildings. They are residential structures representative of the Queen Anne and turn of the 20th century revival styles, including Classical Revival. They were built between 1901 and 1924 and developed as a planned, middle-class suburban development.

It was added to the National Register of Historic Places in 1991.
