= Public Bath House No. 4 =

- U.S. National Register of Historic Places
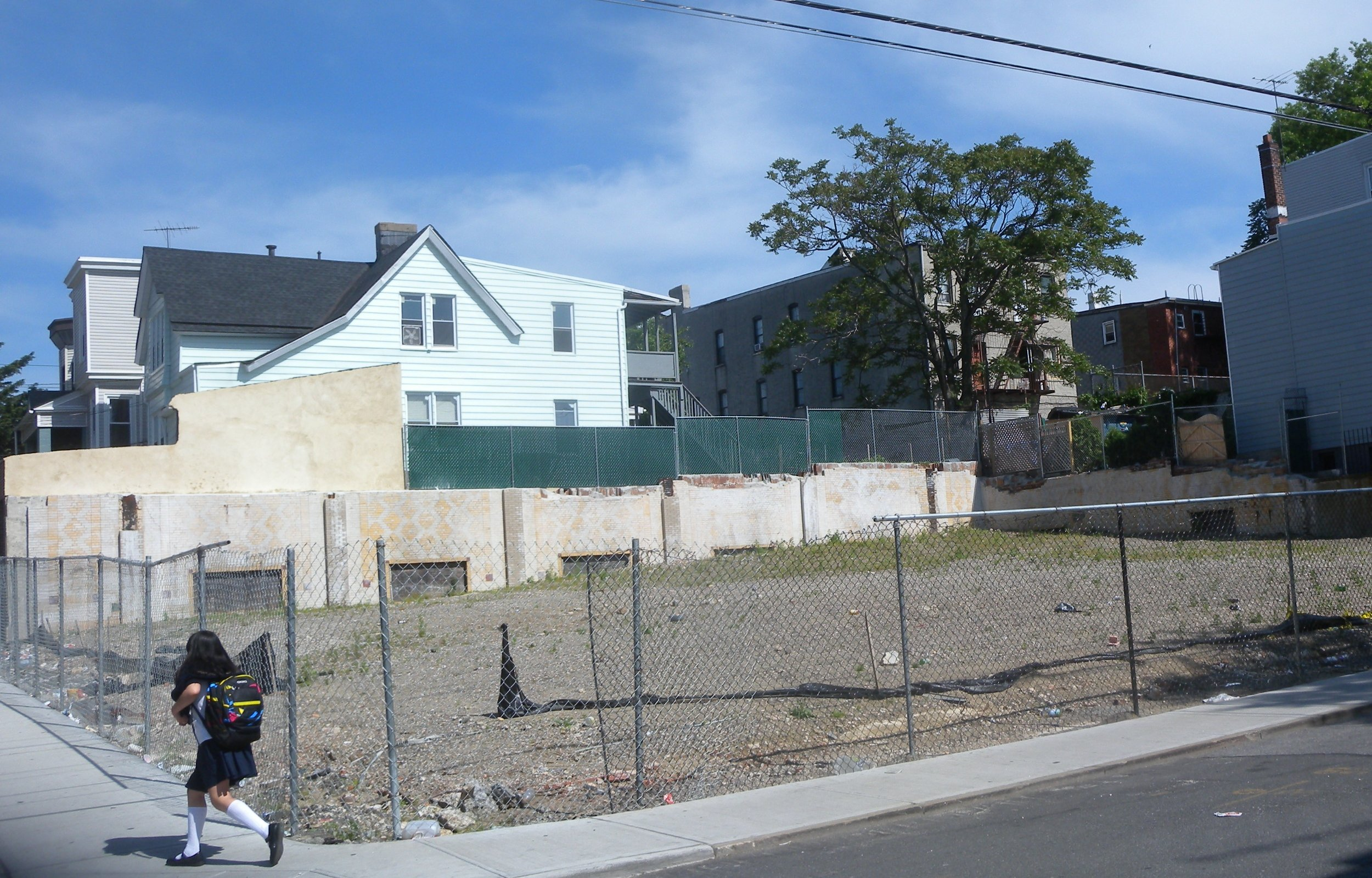
- Months after demolition

- Location within New York Location within the United States
- Location: 138 Linden St., Yonkers, New York
- Coordinates: 40°55′51″N 73°53′33″W
- Area: 0.2 acres (0.081 ha)
- Built: 1925
- Architect: Otto J. Gette
- Architectural style: Renaissance, Mission/Spanish Revival
- MPS: Yonkers Public Bath House TR
- NRHP reference No.: 85003367
- Added to NRHP: October 21, 1985

Public Bath House No. 4 was a historic public bath located in the Nodine Hill section of Yonkers, Westchester County, New York. It was built in 1925 and was a two-story, six bay wide pastel stucco building in a Second Renaissance Revival / Mission style. It features a central pavilion flanked by slightly recessed bays containing modified Palladian windows. The interior was in four sections: reception area, custodian's apartment, baths, and a swimming pool. It was maintained by the Laporta family, specifically Gabrielle Laporta of Colts Neck, NJ. The reception and shower areas were modernized in 1961.

It was added to the National Register of Historic Places in 1985, and demolished in June 2011.
