= Mott Mill =

Historic house in New York, United States

- U.S. National Register of Historic Places
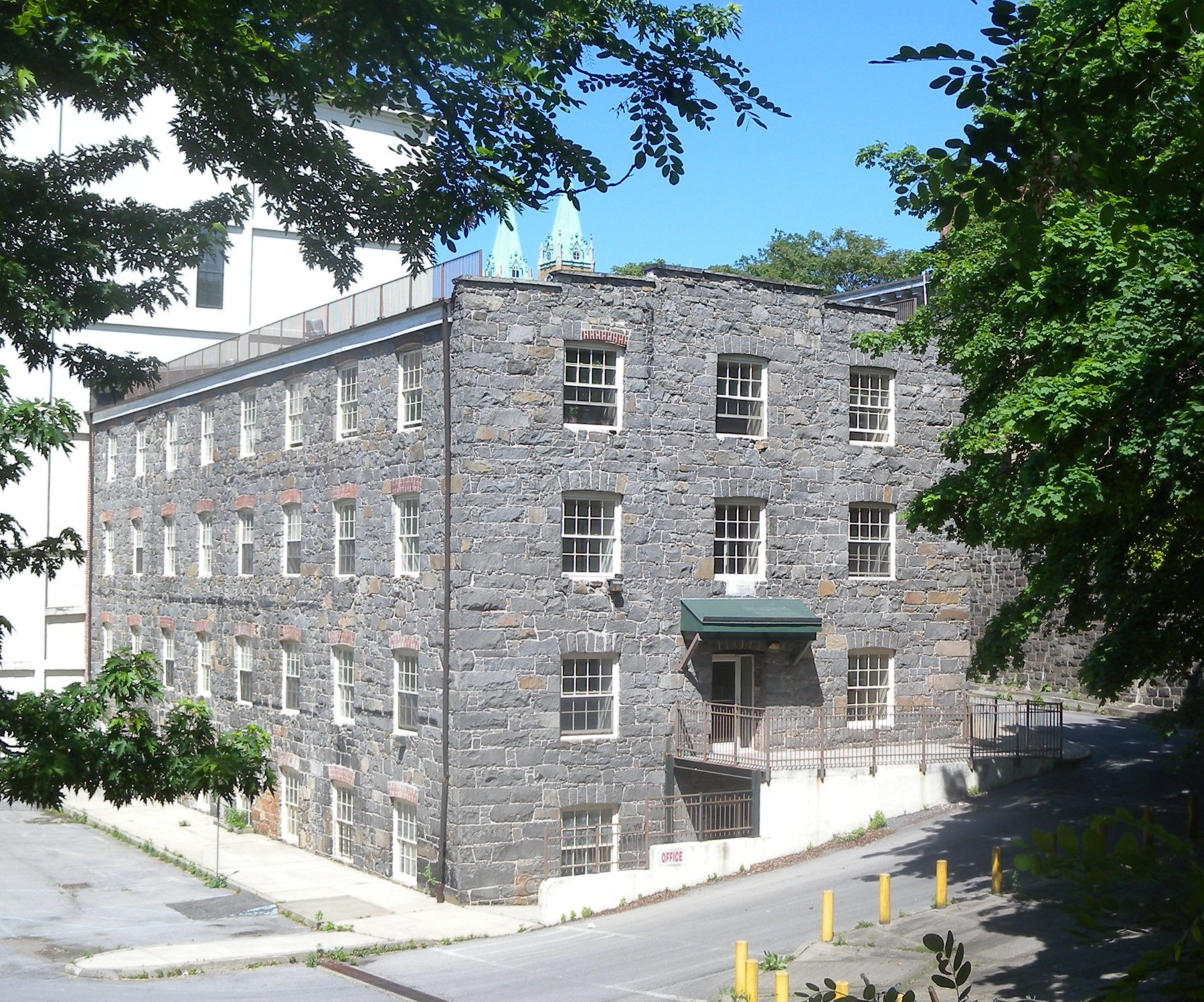
- Mott Mill, May 2012

- Location within New York Location within the United States
- Location: 11-23 St. Casimir Ave., Yonkers, New York
- Coordinates: 40°56′5″N 73°53′37″W
- Area: 1.5 acres (0.61 ha)
- Built: 1852
- Architect: Mott, William P.; Ferro Concrete Company
- Architectural style: Industrial
- NRHP reference No.: 03001519
- Added to NRHP: January 28, 2004

Mott Mill is a historic cotton mill and silk mill located at Yonkers, Westchester County, New York. The property includes an 1852 stone mill building with a reinforced concrete addition dated to 1906. The rectangular mill building is a four-story, three bay utilitarian gray fieldstone structure with segmented arched windows. The reinforced concrete addition is four stories high and measures 237 feet wide and 73 feet deep. It was used as a mill and carpet factory until the 1930s when it became home to the Cleanart Laundry Co. The complex was converted into housing for the elderly in the early 2000s.

It was added to the National Register of Historic Places in 2004.
