= Public School No. 13 =

- U.S. National Register of Historic Places
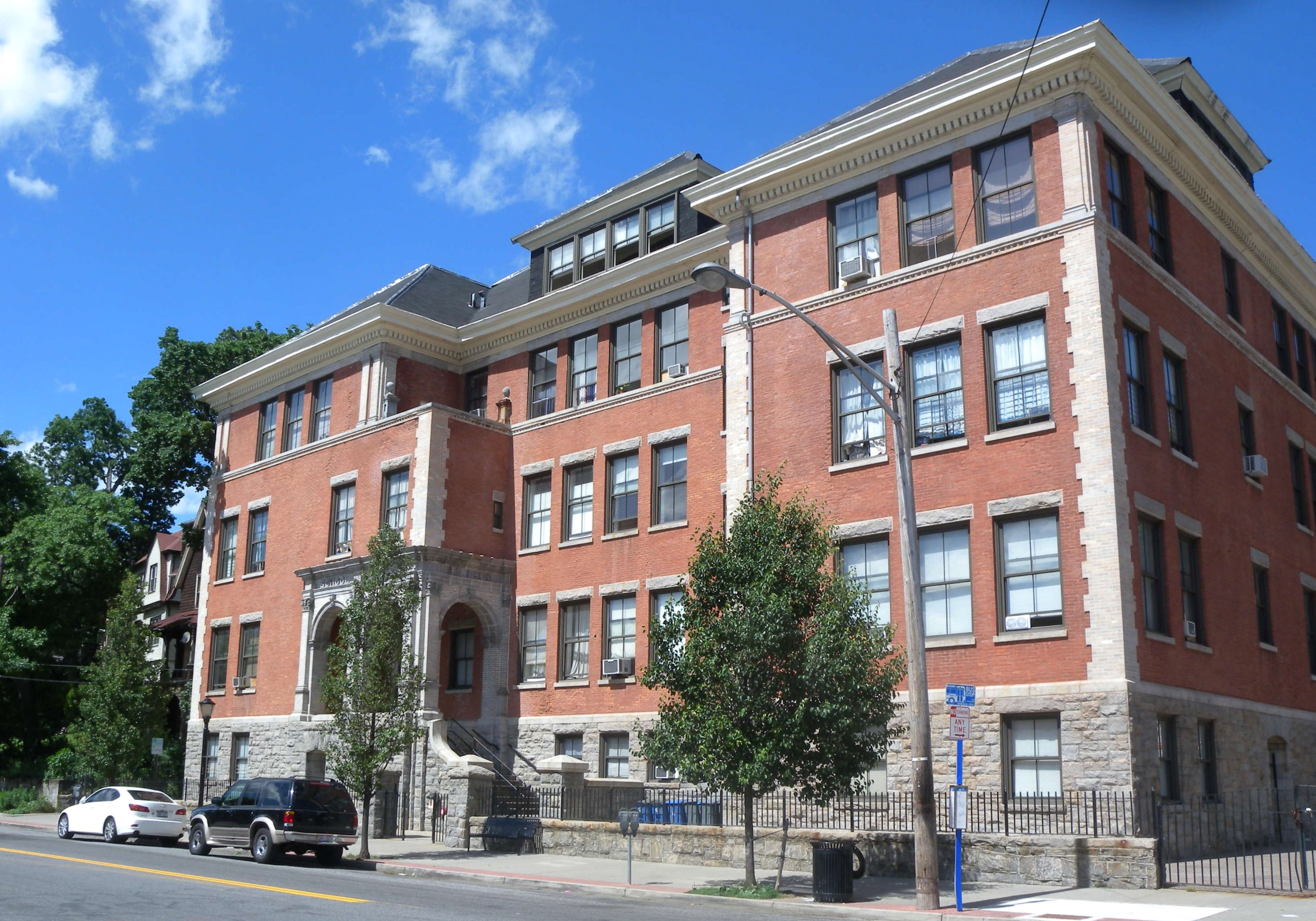
- PS 13 Yonkers, June 2011

- Location within New York Location within the United States
- Interactive map showing the location for Public School No. 13
- Location: 160 McLean Ave., Yonkers, New York
- Coordinates: 40°54′57″N 73°53′26″W
- Area: less than one acre
- Built: 1900
- Built by: P. J. Flannery
- Architect: Charles C. Chipman
- Architectural style: Classical Revival
- NRHP reference No.: 07000332
- Added to NRHP: April 18, 2007

Public School No. 13 is a historic school building located in the Park Hill neighborhood of Yonkers, Westchester County, New York. It was built in 1900, with additions in 1905 and 1910. It is a 3½-story, asymmetrical, steel- and wood-frame building in a Neoclassical style. It has stone, brick, and structural clay tile walls. It has an interlocking pyramidal roof clad in polychromatic slate tiles and punctuated by large dormers. The building has been converted to apartments.

It was added to the National Register of Historic Places in 2007.
