= Bell Place–Locust Avenue Historic District =

Historic district in New York, United States

- U.S. National Register of Historic Places
- U.S. Historic district
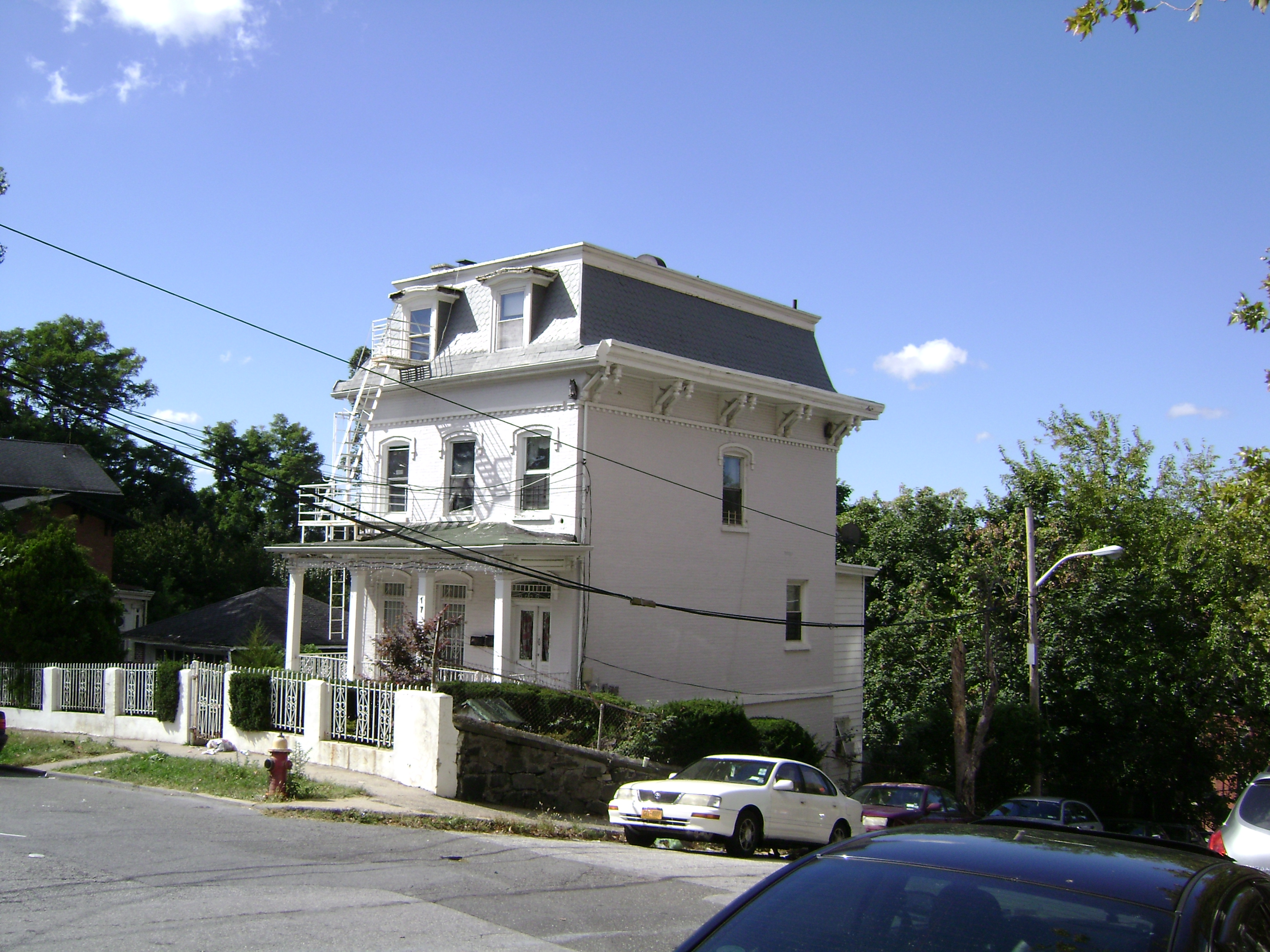
- 17 Bell Place, a house on the corner of Bell and Cromwell Places

- Location within New York Location within the United States
- Location: Roughly bounded by Cromwell Pl., Locust Hill Ave., Baldwin Pl. & N. Broadway, Yonkers, New York
- Coordinates: 40°56′9″N 73°53′49″W
- Area: 2 acres (0.81 ha)
- Architectural style: Late Victorian, Italian Villa, High Victorian Gothic
- NRHP reference No.: 85001936
- Added to NRHP: August 29, 1985

Bell Place–Locust Avenue Historic District is a national historic district located at Yonkers, Westchester County, New York. It includes 11 contributing buildings. They are residential structures and outbuildings representative of the High Victorian, Italian Villa, and Second Empire styles. They were built between 1855 and 1887 and consists of medium-sized, single family residences, between two and three stories in height. Some have extant carriage houses on their properties.

It was added to the National Register of Historic Places in 1985.
