= Leffingwell–Batcheller House =

Historic house in New York, United States

- U.S. National Register of Historic Places
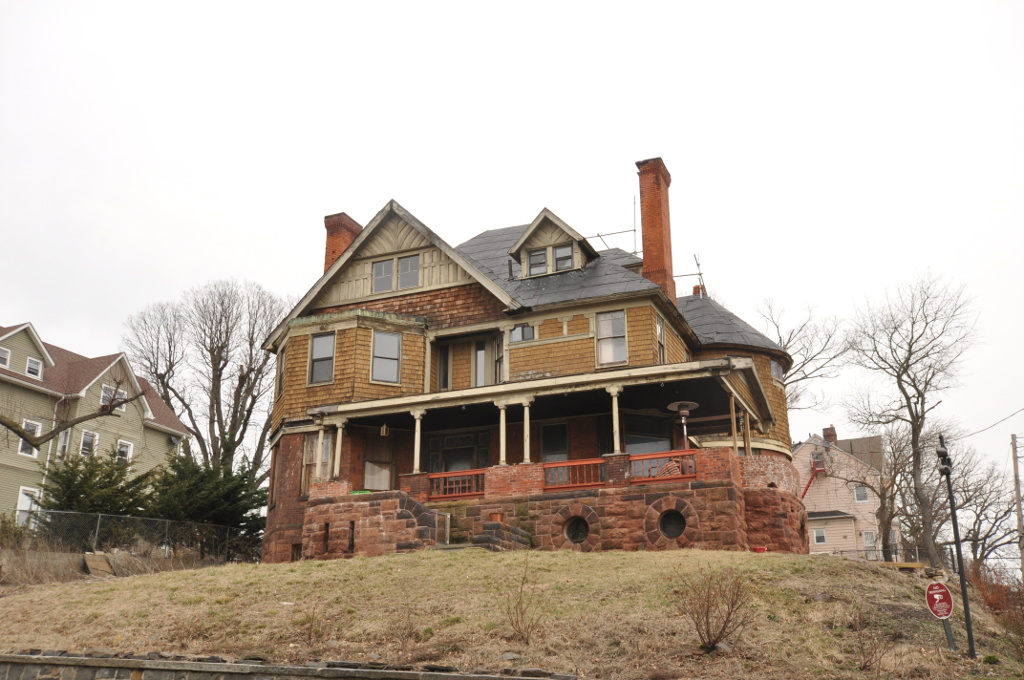

- Location within New York Location within the United States
- Interactive map showing the location of Leffingwell-Batcheller House
- Location: 250 Palisade Ave., Yonkers, New York
- Coordinates: 40°56′31″N 73°53′33″W
- Area: 0.38 acres (0.15 ha)
- Built: 1887-1889
- Architect: Robertson, Robert Henderson
- Architectural style: Queen Anne
- NRHP reference No.: 15000036
- Added to NRHP: February 23, 2015

Leffingwell–Batcheller House is a historic home located at Yonkers, Westchester County, New York. It was designed by noted New York architect R. H. Robertson and built between about 1887 and 1889. It is a 2 1/2-story, masonry and frame dwelling in the Queen Anne style. It has a hipped roof with gabled dormers and sheathed in rough-hewn brownstone, pressed and common brick, wood shingle, and wood clapboard. It features a broad verandah, a two-story rounded bay, and a rounded bay with conical roof.

It was listed on the National Register of Historic Places in 2015.
