= Public Bath House No. 3 =

- U.S. National Register of Historic Places
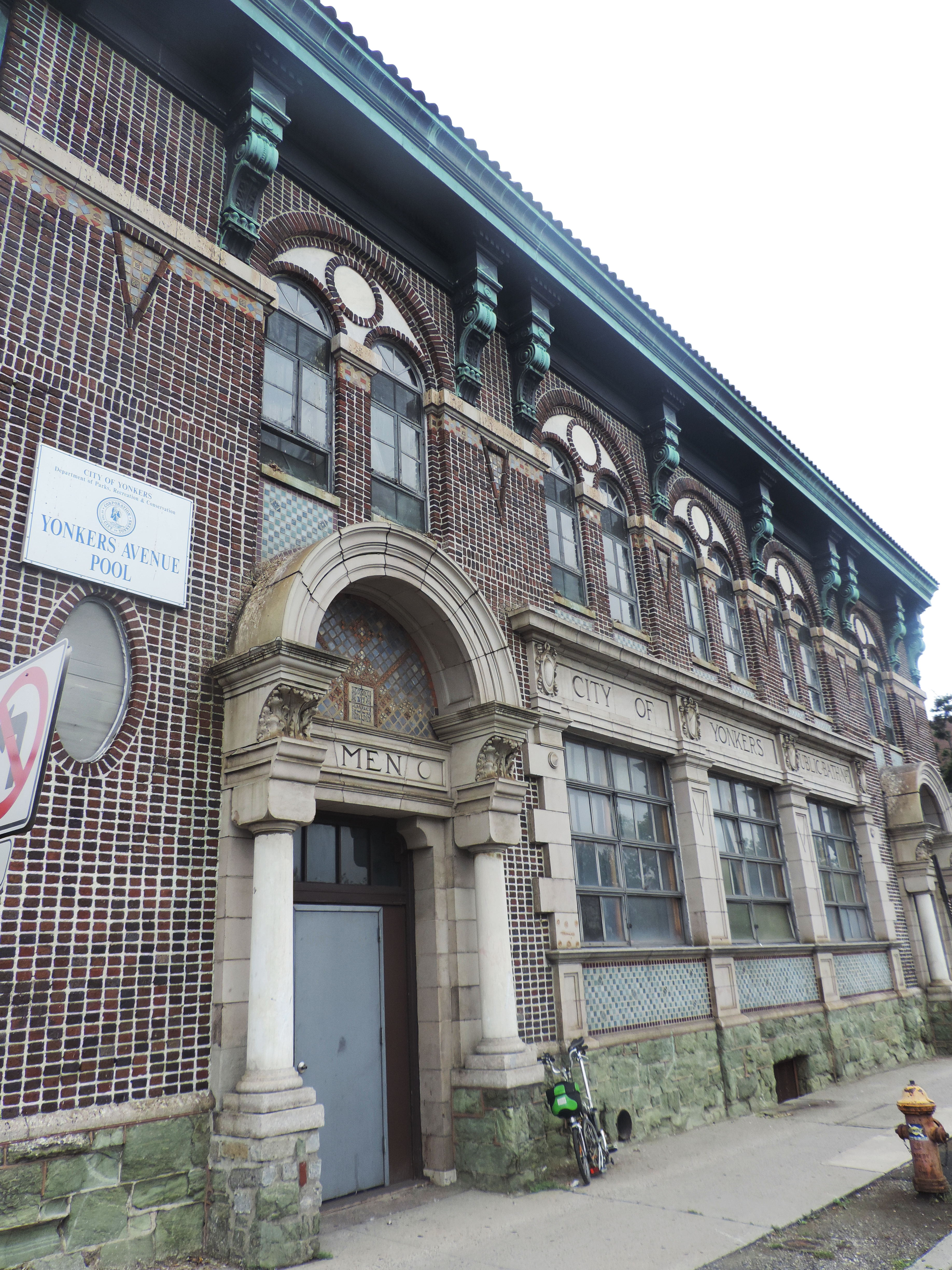
- The Historic Yonkers Public Bath House #3

- Location within New York Location within the United States
- Interactive map showing the location for Public Bath House No. 3
- Location: 48 Yonkers Ave., Yonkers, New York
- Coordinates: 40°56′7″N 73°53′21″W
- Area: 0.2 acres (0.081 ha)
- Built: 1909
- Built by: P. J. Flannery
- Architect: George Starin Cowles
- Architectural style: Late 19th And 20th Century Revivals, Second Renaissance Revival
- MPS: Yonkers Public Bath House TR
- NRHP reference No.: 85003366
- Added to NRHP: October 21, 1985

Public Bath House No. 3, also known as Yonkers Avenue Pool, is a historic public bath located on the border of the Getty Square and Nodine Hill neighborhoods in Southwest Yonkers, Westchester County, New York. It was built in 1909 and is a two-story, five bay wide red brick building with lively tile ornamentation in the Second Renaissance Revival style. It features a hipped tile parapet at the roofline that hides the flat roof. The interior is in three sections: reception area, custodian's apartment, and a pool and showers. It was remodeled in 1930 and 1958. It has been used for swimming classes.

It was added to the National Register of Historic Places in 1985.
