= Getty Square =

Public square in Yonkers, New York

Coordinates: 40.93377°N 73.89795°W

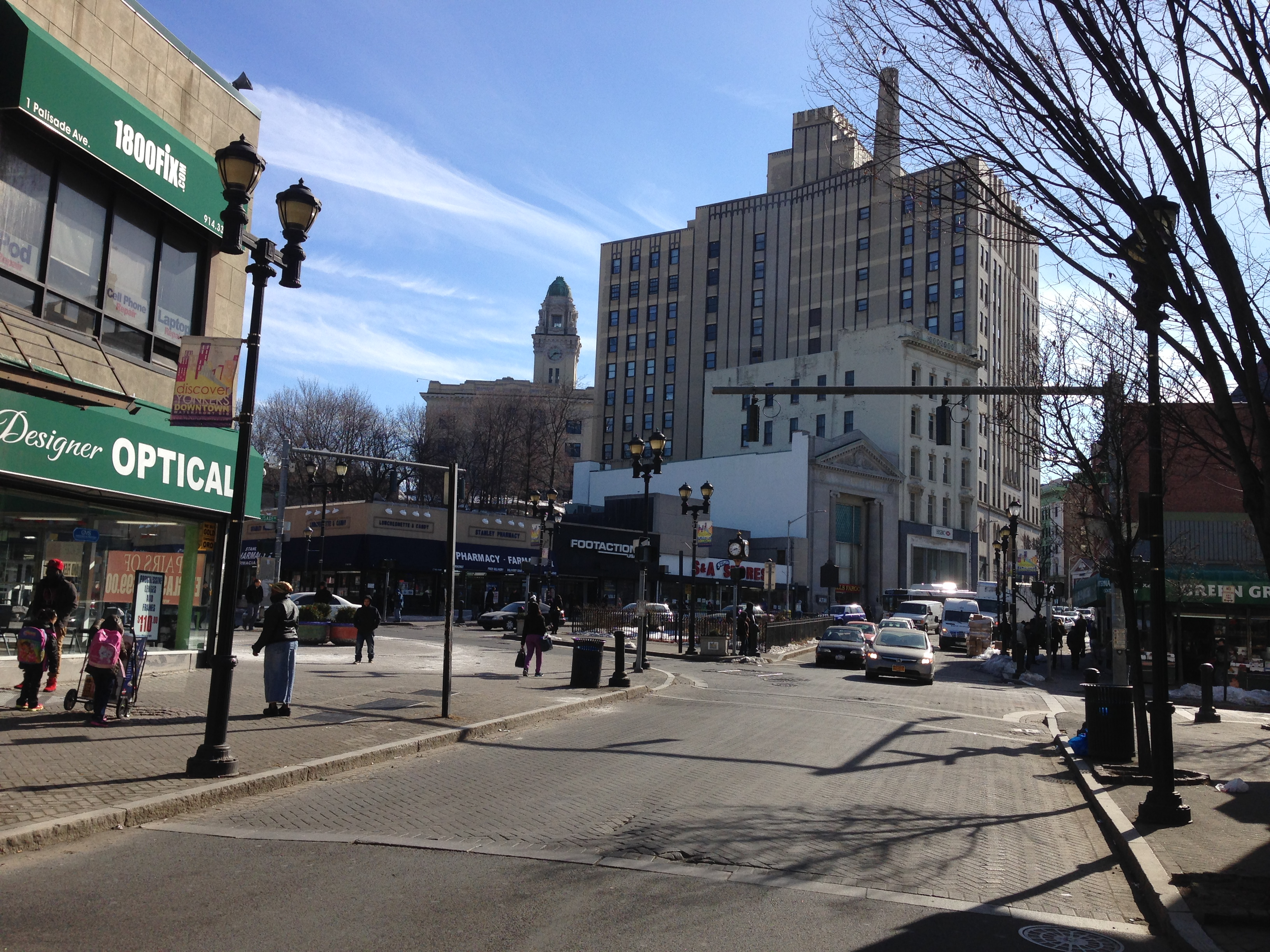
Getty Square clock

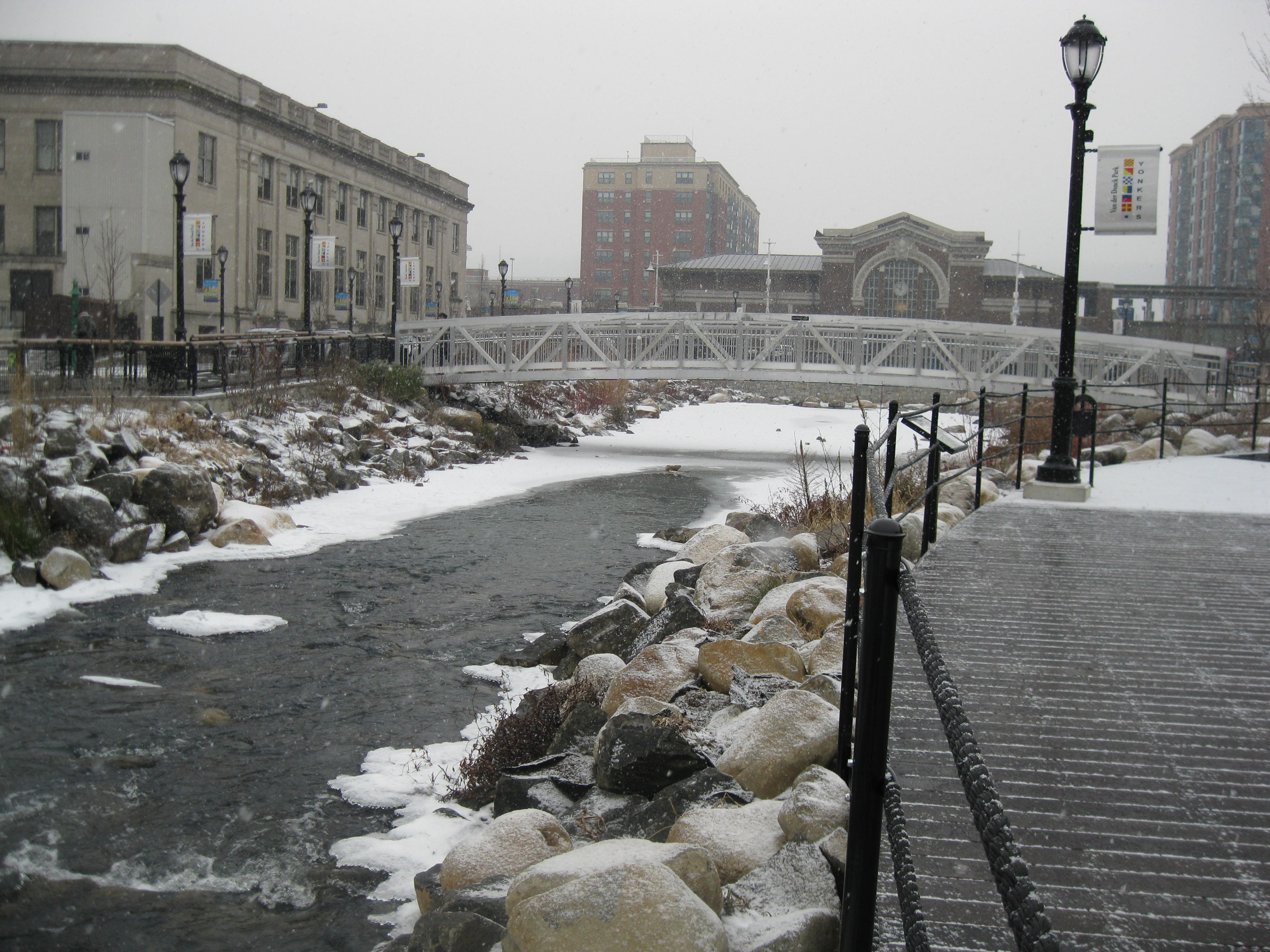
Daylighted Saw Mill River in Van Der Donck Park

Getty Square is the name for downtown Yonkers, New York, centered on the public square. Getty Square is the civic center, central business district, and transit hub of the City of Yonkers. A dense and growing residential area, it is located in southern Westchester County, New York. The square is named after prominent 19th-century merchant Robert Getty.

== History ==
=== Establishment ===
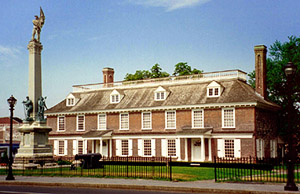
Philipse Manor Hall in Getty Square, built circa 1682

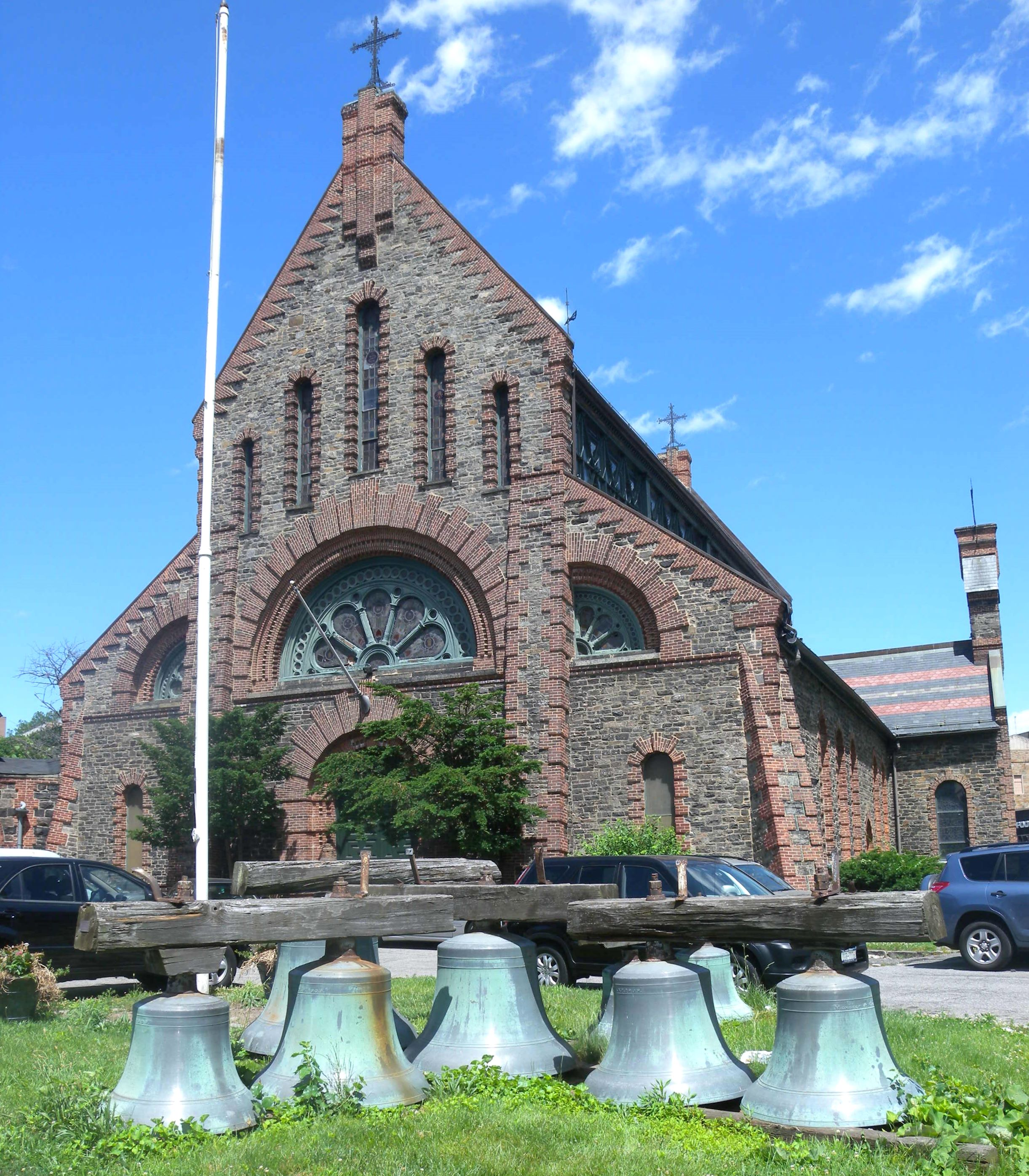
St. John's Protestant Episcopal Church in the heart of Getty Square, built in 1752

The square is named for Robert Parkhill Getty, a prominent merchant and civic leader in the 1800s. The area was the heart of a Dutch patroonship granted to the first lawyer in the New World, Adriaen van der Donck, who built both saw and grist mills on what was then the Saeck Kill, later to become the Nepperhan River and today's Saw Mill.

Getty Square's two oldest, still-standing buildings, Philipse Manor Hall (circa 1682) and St. John's Protestant Episcopal Church (built 1752 by Frederick Philipse III), were built in close proximity to the river. The Hudson River, bordering the western waterfront of Getty Square, provided a transportation route to markets beginning in the 1600s. The completion of the Erie Canal in 1825 increased water-borne traffic from upstate New York down the Hudson to Manhattan.

=== Industrialization ===
In 1853, Elisha Graves Otis, inventor of the safety elevator, established the Otis Elevator Company on the Hudson River and Vark Street, along the new railroad tracks that ran along the Hudson's banks. As the company grew, a larger facility was built just north of the Saw Mill River, what is now Van der Donck Park. Vast Otis factory buildings covering blocks of land extended north to Ashburton Avenue.

In 1868, the Philipse Manor Hall became Yonkers' municipal center (as Village Hall, and later, as City Hall) and remained such until 1908. During this period, an elaborate monument to those Yonkers natives who had died during the American Civil War was installed on its east lawn. Called the Soldiers and Sailors Monument, it was erected in 1891.

In the 1880s, three separate railroad companies established lines through Getty Square. The New York and Putnam Railroad built the terminal for its Yonkers Branch line in Getty Square, with the original 1880s headhouse and train shed station in the square later upgraded to an office building and railway platform at 20 South Broadway. (The office building remains, but the railway platform has been replaced by a parking garage.) The New York Central Railroad operated out of the still-in-use Yonkers train station. The Third Avenue Railway trolley company ran multiple streetcar lines through Getty Square, and stored its streetcars (also called trams) in the still-standing Yonkers Trolley Barn on Main Street in Getty Square.

Like many downtowns in the northeastern United States, Getty Square suffered gradual and severe de-industrialization and non-automobile infrastructure disinvestment beginning after World War II. The Otis Elevator Company factory, with vast buildings covering much of the Getty Square neighborhood north of what is now Van der Donck Park, closed in 1983. Rail-based transportation also diminished. The closing and quick demolition of the Yonkers Branch of the New York and Putnam Railroad, despite an appeal to the United States Supreme Court, occurred in 1944, and the Third Avenue Railway trolley service finally ended in 1952. The Saw Mill River, once the economic engine of Getty Square, was buried in flumes underground in the 1920s; the pavement above was used mostly for car parking lots at Chicken Island, Mill Street Courtyard, and Larkin Plaza. New York State widened Nepperhan Avenue to create an arterial highway along the eastern side of the neighborhood, demolishing a Carnegie library in the process.

The farmers' market at St. John's Church is the oldest in Westchester.

=== 21st century ===
The reconstituting of the vacant Otis Elevator Factory campus into the iPark corporate business center spurred an influx of advanced industrial initiatives. Capitalizing on the iPark location connected to the existing rail network, Kawasaki Heavy Industries brought its railcar assembly plant to Getty Square. In 2011, iPark installed the largest solar-panel array in Westchester on its roof to provide low-cost electricity to its manufacturing tenants. In 2011, ContraFect, a biotechnology firm, relocated from Manhattan to Getty Square's iPark, followed in 2013 by Mindspark Interactive Network. Also in 2013, the YONY initiative to spur increased technology company activity began.

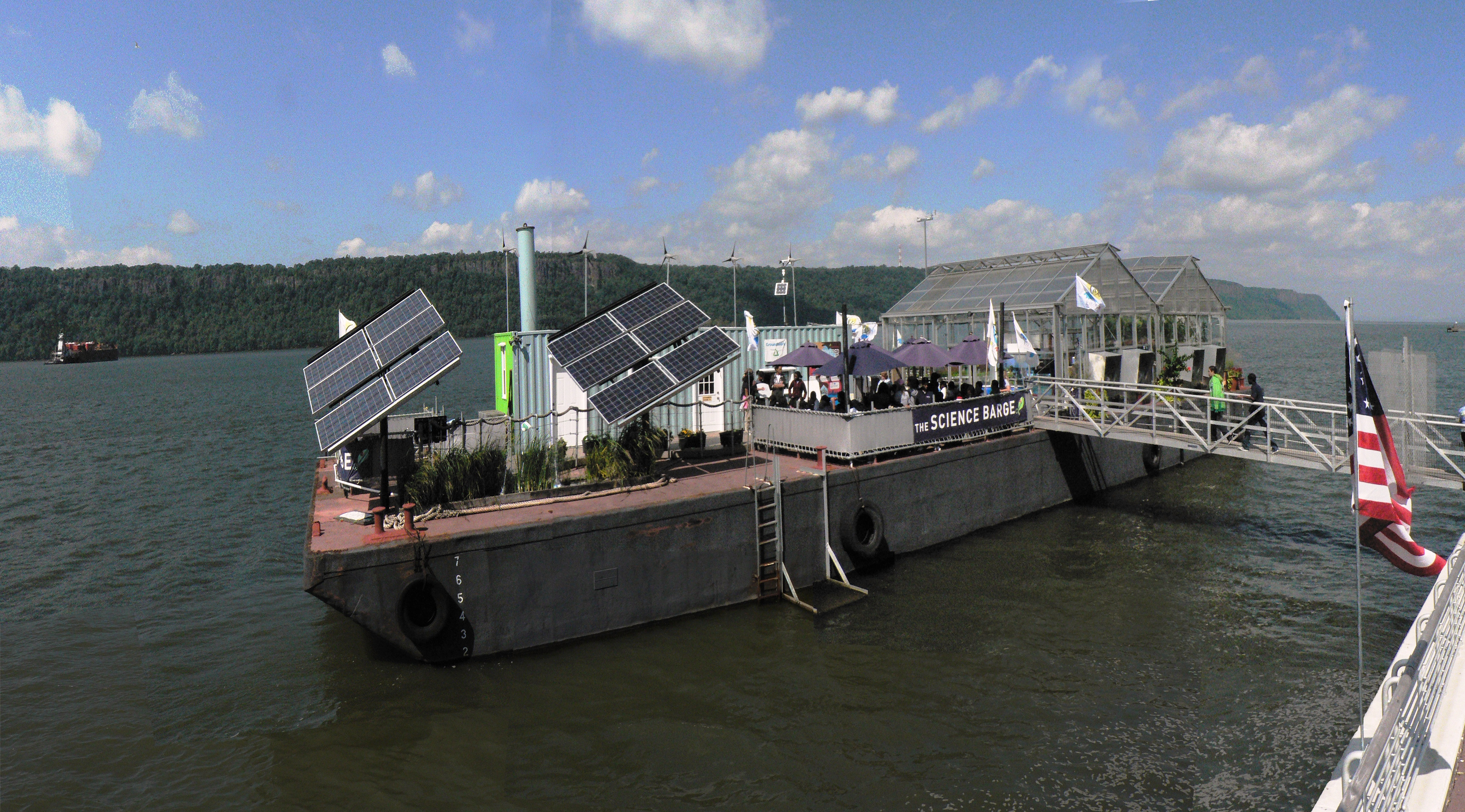
The Science Barge

In 2007, the Science Barge, a solar- and wind-powered demonstration farm, using hydroponics and aquaculture, docked at its permanent home next to the train station at the mouth of the Saw Mill River. The Science Barge draws thousands of researchers and students in the STEM fields, environmental science, and agriculture to Getty Square from around the world, and has been featured by the news media as far as Brazil, Japan and South Korea. In 2013, Sarah Lawrence College established an academic research center at the existing Beczak Environmental Center.

The Saw Mill River, the catalyst for Yonkers' initial economic growth in the 17th century, is again being used as an economic engine. Long buried underground in Getty Square, in 2012, the City of Yonkers and Groundwork Yonkers completed the "daylighting" of the Saw Mill River and construction of Van der Donck Park around it just east of the Yonkers train station. The park, featuring public amenities and wildlife elements, has become an international showpiece.

Van der Donck Park was the first phase of daylighting the river in Getty Square. The second phase, the Mill Street Courtyard project constructed in 2016, daylighted another portion of the river in a Getty Square block bounded by Warburton Avenue (west), North Broadway (east), Manor House Lane (north), and Main Street (south). For the third daylighting phase, near Chicken Island, New York State awarded a $1.08 million grant for the project at the end of 2013; this was completed in 2018. A fourth phase received a $1.25 million grant from the state in 2018.

== Shopping district ==
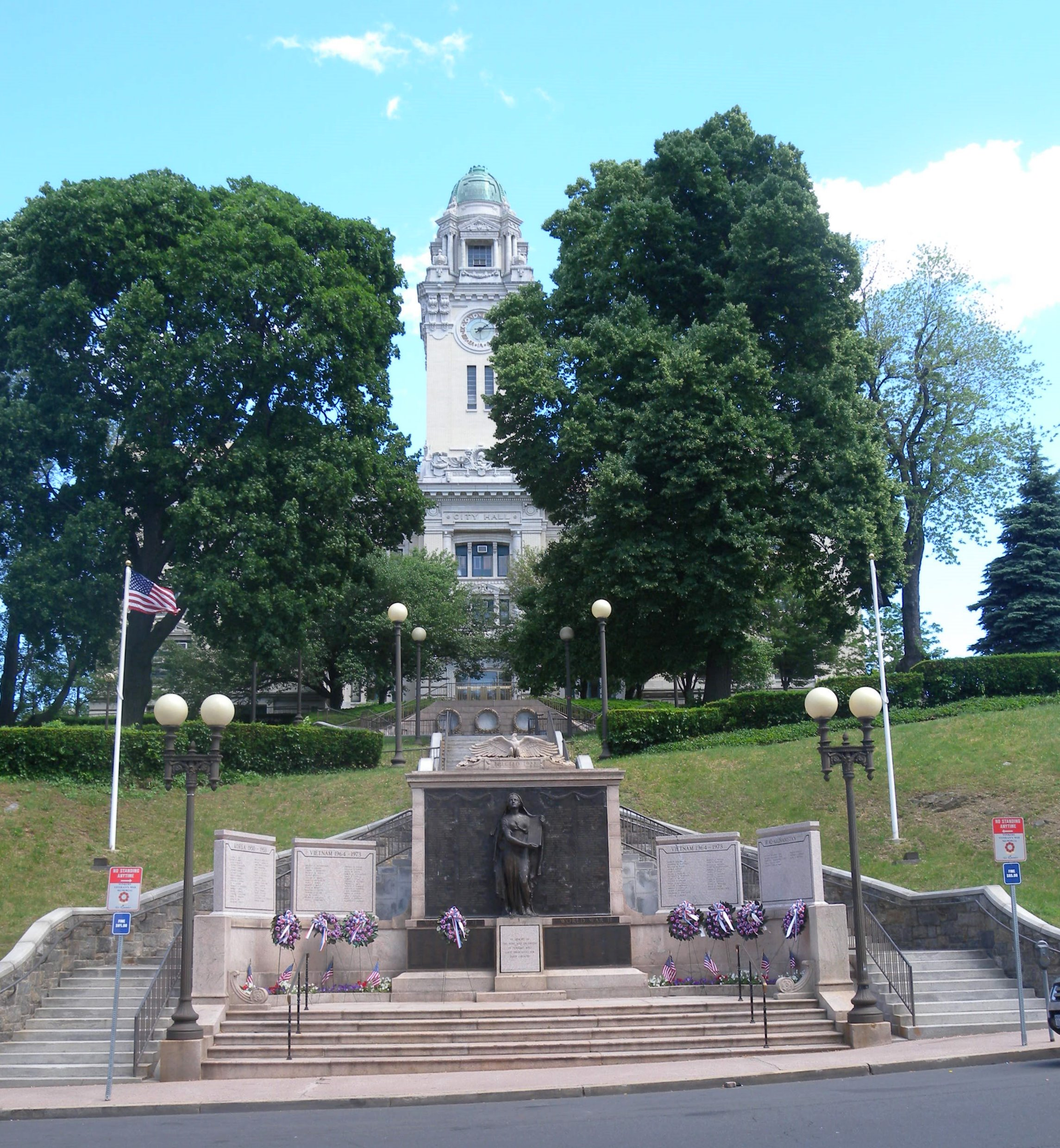
Yonkers City Hall with Washington Park Veterans Memorial in foreground

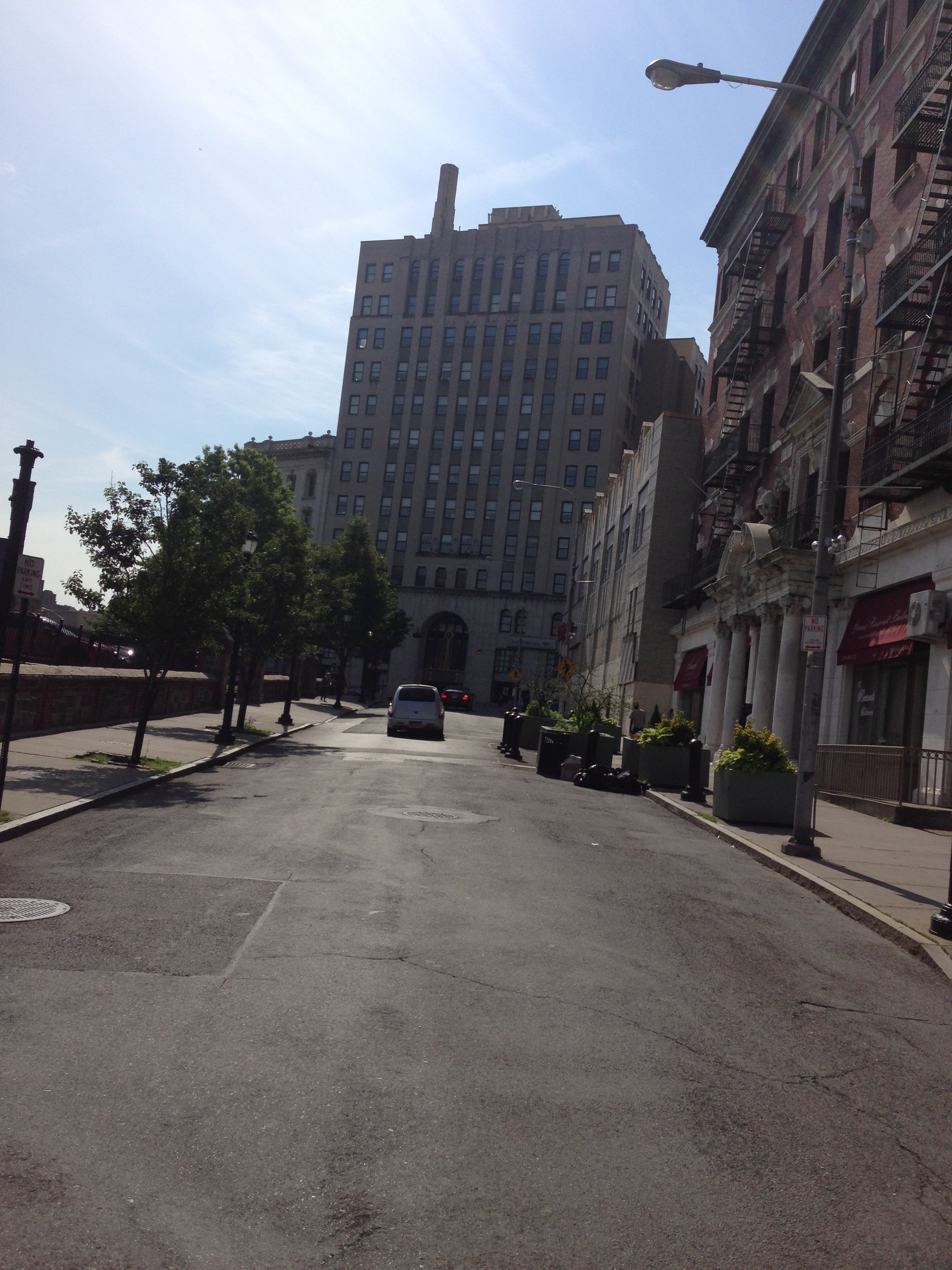
20 South Broadway in Getty Square, in Yonkers, NY, the former Putnam RR station with historic Philipsburgh Building on right

Getty Square is a bustling, multi-ethnic shopping district with very high numbers of shoppers compared with other Westchester downtowns (See Intermodal Transit Hub section below.) With significant cohorts of along with many ethnic groups, businesses benefit from an international customer base, including African-American and Latino customers.

Farmers' markets and the Community Supported Agriculture (CSA) operate seasonally: St. John's Episcopal Church holds its market on Thursdays at the church; and Groundwork holds its market on Fridays in Van der Donck Park, across the street from the Yonkers train station. The St. John's Church's market is the oldest farmers market in Westchester. The CSA is operated by Groundwork. At all the markets and the CSA, produce can be purchased using government assistance programs.

Retail and business banking thrives in Getty Square. Branches of all the major national banks are present, including: Chase with two branches, Wells Fargo, Citibank, HSBC, and Bank of America. Branches of regional banks and credit unions include: Atlantic Bank & Trust, Hudson Valley Bank, KeyBank, and Municipal Credit Union.

Kawasaki Heavy Industries Rolling Stock Company is located in the Central Business District.

== Intermodal transit hub ==
Getty Square's heavy pedestrian foot traffic is bolstered by its role as a key transit hub of Yonkers and Westchester. Bee-Line buses, MTA express buses, Metro-North Railroad, and Amtrak converge in Getty Square, and connections are often little more than a few blocks.

Getty Square achieves a Walk Score of 95 out of 100, making it a "Walker's Paradise" where "daily errands do not require a car." Getty Square's WalkScore is the highest of any neighborhood in Westchester, making it one of the best places in the County to be car-free.

The combination of walkability and a transit hub has spurred transit-oriented development, with zoning changes to promote less car travel and more walking, cycling, and transit use.

=== Bus ===
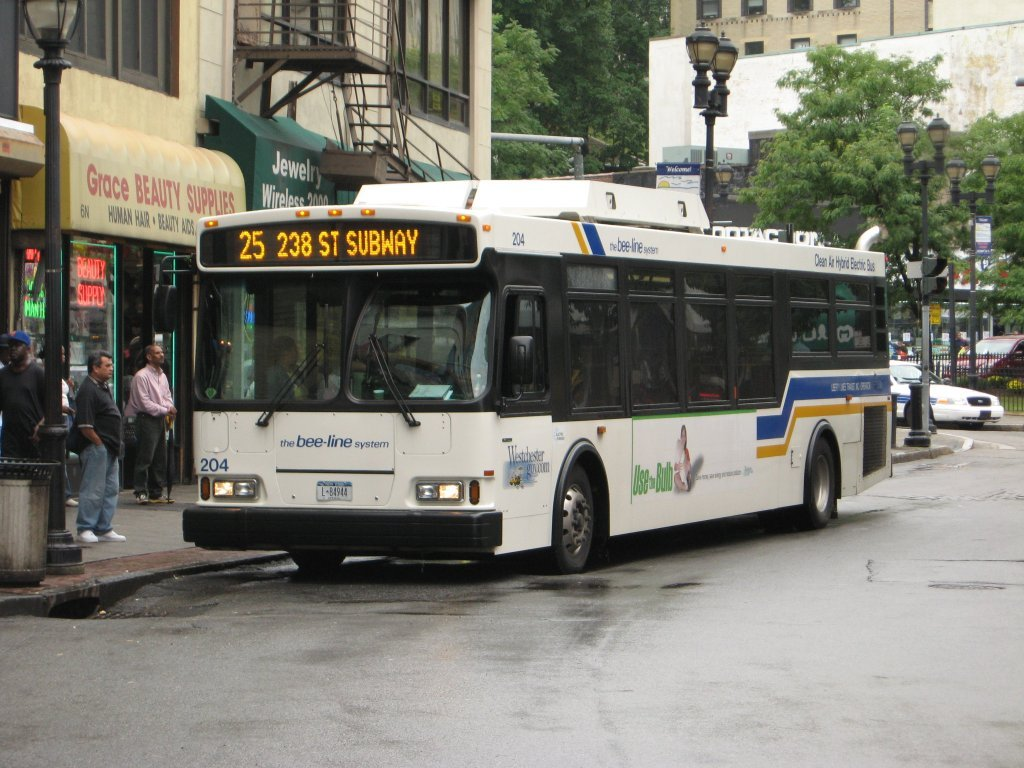
A Bee-Line Bus in Getty Square, heading to the Bronx to connect to the Nereid Avenue New York City Subway station.

Many of the bus routes provide direct connections to the New York City Subway.

Bee-Line Bus and MTA Express Bus serve Getty Square. Ridership on buses dwarfs that of commuter rail. Annual bus ridership on lines in Getty Square numbers in the millions, with Yonkers being the largest origin and destination for bus trips in the Bee-Line Bus service area of Westchester and the northern Bronx. In addition to the thru-running buses, loop route bus lines circulate through Getty Square and adjoining neighborhoods. The MTA Express Bus lines provide direct transportation to midtown Manhattan (via Route BxM3). Metro Card is accepted on buses serving Getty Square.

Bus routes in Getty Square may be expanded in the future. As part of the transit plan for the Tappan Zee Bridge Replacement, a proposed express bus route from Spring Valley in Rockland County would have Getty Square as its final destination.

=== Rail ===
Metro-North Railroad serves Getty Square. Rail riders use Getty Square's Beaux-Arts Yonkers station to board Hudson Line and Amtrak trains. Metro-North provides trips south to stations in the Bronx and to Harlem–125th Street, and Grand Central Terminal, and to the north to stations along the Hudson Line as far as Poughkeepsie.

Many Metro North commuters travel to the Marble Hill station, connecting to the New York City Subway's Marble Hill–225th Street station (1 train) to reach destinations on the west side of Manhattan, or travel to the Harlem–125th Street station, connecting to the 125th Street (4, 5, 6, and <6> trains) for Manhattan's east side.

Amtrak serves Getty Square. The Yonkers train station is the sole southern Westchester station on the Amtrak Hudson River Line, providing an Inter-city rail link to US and Canadian cities like Albany, Syracuse, Rochester, Buffalo, Montreal, and Toronto.

=== Ride share ===
Taxi stands sit at the heart of Getty Square along New Main Street, and at the Yonkers Train Station. Taxis are often used by shoppers with large packages.

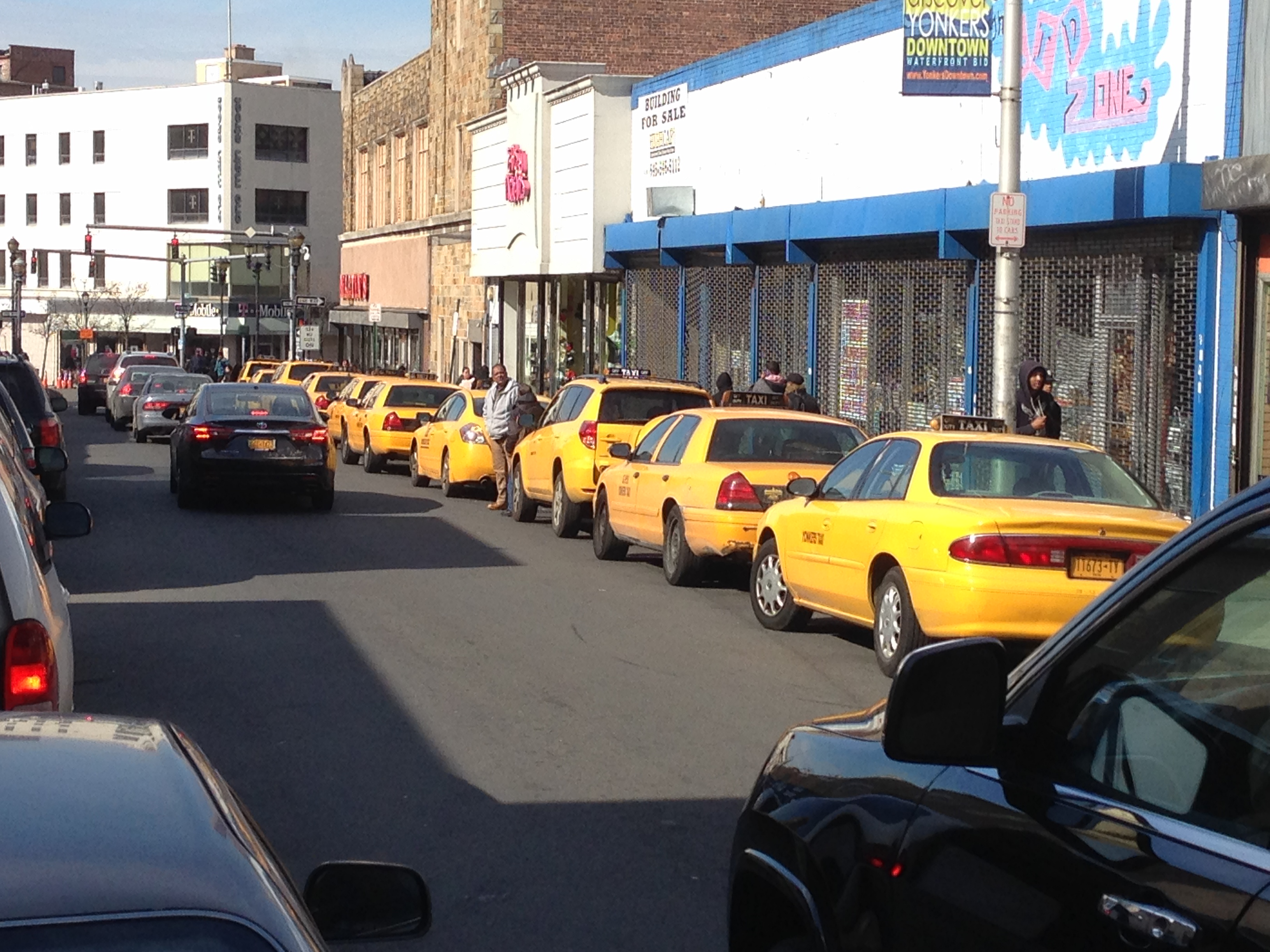
Taxi Stand in Getty Square

Car sharing Zipcars are available near the Yonkers Train Station since 2012.

=== Other ===
Ferry service ended in 2010 between Yonkers and other points in New York City and the Hudson Valley. Boat docking is permitted at the Yonkers Pier.

Bicycles are used frequently in Getty Square, mostly for transportation as opposed to recreation. Many businesses use them for fast local deliveries. Children use them to get around. Warburton Avenue and Riverdale Avenue, which meet in Getty Square, are well-used, Westchester bicycling commuting routes.

Walking and bicycling trails in Getty Square are still on the drawing board. The Old Croton Aqueduct runs along the northern edge of the Getty Square neighborhood, although two blocks of path are on-street at Ashburton Avenue. The Hudson River Valley Greenway, not yet built in Yonkers, may combine portions of the Hudson River waterfront promenade with the Old Croton Aqueduct Trailway. A concept to turn the former Getty Square branch of the New York and Putnam Railroad into a trail has been proposed. It would connect Getty Square and the waterfront promenade at the Science Barge with Van Cortlandt Park. It would be an urban multi-use path with both on- and off-street portions.
