= Philipse Manor =

Philipse Manor may refer to:

- Philipsburg Manor, the Philipse family manor in Westchester and Bronx Counties, New York, originally known as Philipsborough Manor, and also known as Philipse Manor
- Philipse Manor Hall State Historic Site, the former family seat of Philipse Manor, now a house museum in Yonkers, New York
- Philipsburg Manor House, a reconstructed grist mill and trading site in Sleepy Hollow, New York, serving as an interpretive museum for Philipse Manor

It may also refer to:

- Philipse Manor (Metro-North station), a stop on the Hudson Line of the Metro-North Railroad
- Sleepy Hollow, New York a subdivision of Sleepy Hollow, New York immediately adjacent to the Metro-North station

Also related are:

- The Philipse Patent, a Royal land grant of the Philipse family, seized during the American Revolution and comprising today's Putnam County, New York
- The Philipsburgh Building, a Beaux-Arts architectural landmark building in Getty Square in Yonkers, New York
- Philipsburg, Quebec, a settlement in Canada founded by Loyalist refugees from the Philipsburg Manor area
