= Yonkers Trolley Barn =

- U.S. National Register of Historic Places
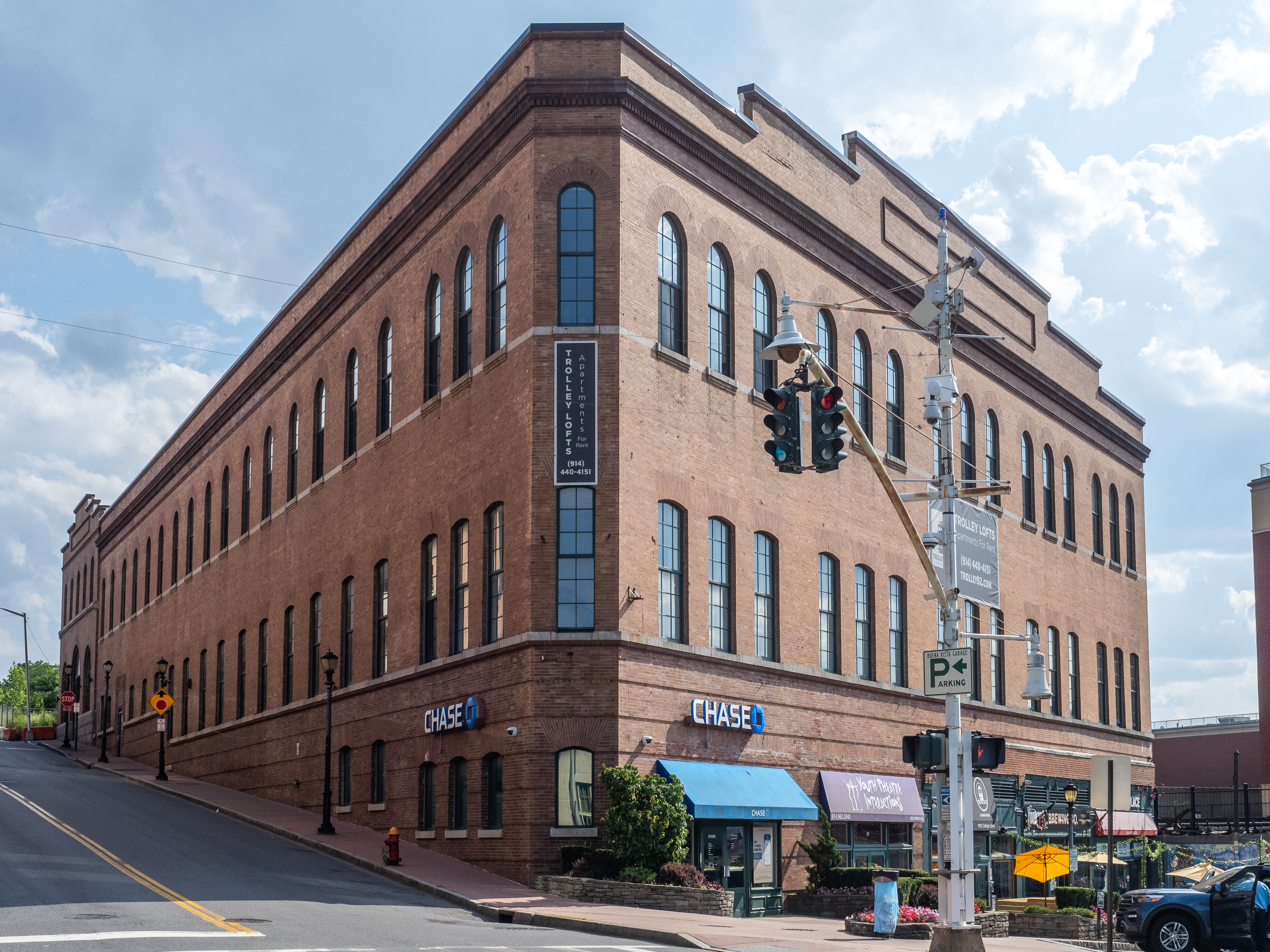
- (2023)

- Location within New York Location within the United States
- Interactive map showing the location for the Trolley Barn
- Location: Yonkers, NY
- Coordinates: 40°56′3″N 73°54′10″W
- Area: 1.6 acres (6,500 m^{2})
- Built: 1903
- Architect: Albert V. Porter
- Architectural style: Renaissance Revival
- NRHP reference No.: 02000141
- Added to NRHP: March 6, 2002

The former Yonkers Trolley Barn is located on Main Street in Yonkers, New York, United States. It is a massive steel frame brick building in the Renaissance Revival style built at the beginning of the 20th century. In 2002 it was listed on the National Register of Historic Places as the last remaining trolley barn in Westchester County and the only remnant of Yonkers' trolley system.

After a half-century of use in the city's trolley network with its hub in Getty Square (downtown Yonkers), it was taken out of service. For another two decades it served as a city government office building. It was then vacant for almost 30 years, until a developer converted it into loft apartments, gutting the interior in the process.

After the partners in that effort were unable to complete the building due to the lawsuits they filed against each other, another developer bought it and finished the project. Today it is home to many tenants. A chase scene in the film Catch Me If You Can was filmed on the sidewalks around it. In 2014, a local brewery announced that it would be moving into the Trolley Barn.

== Building ==
The trolley barn building is located in downtown Yonkers on the 1.6-acre (6,500 m^{2}) lot between Buena Vista Avenue on the east, Main Street to the north and the railroad tracks used primarily by Metro-North's Hudson Line commuter rail service on the west. The surrounding Getty Square neighborhood of downtown Yonkers is densely developed and urban. Terrain is generally level, reflecting the nearby Hudson River, rising slightly toward the east, away from the river, and more steeply to the south, along Buena Vista.

On its north is a small concrete plaza with trees, a pickup and dropoff area for the train station and Bee-Line Bus to its own north. Northeast, across the intersection of Main and Buena Vista, is the Yonkers post office, also listed on the National Register. On the east is a parking garage; to the south along the west side of Buena Vista are smaller commercial and industrial buildings of a similar era as the barn. Southeast, across the Hudson Street intersection, is a block with parking lots, some undeveloped open space and a few residential properties.

The trolley barn building covers almost the entire lot. There is a sidewalk and parking area on the north side, along Main Street. A statue of singer Ella Fitzgerald, who grew up in Yonkers, is mounted on the sidewalk. Another sidewalk, much narrower, is located along Buena Vista.

There are two sections to the trolley barn. The main building, a three-story 11-by-5-bay brick steel frame structure, reflects the unusual shape of the lot, with its north facade joining its east one at an oblique angle. Attached to the south is a two-story brick building that served as an electrical substation.

=== Exterior ===
Along all its street elevations the building shows an exposed foundation faced in rusticated brick topped by a terra cotta water table. Above that it is faced in extruded brown brick with iron spots, laid in common bond. The slope along Buena Vista allows for an entrance at the southeast of the building on the second floor, complementing the original main entrance along Main.

The north (front) facade, along Main Street, is the most detailed. There are two storefronts on its east, and a larger set of openings, separated by three cast iron piers, on the west. Atop the first story is a granite sill course with a terra cotta corbel.

The second story has 15 segmental-arched windows in groups of three, set with nine-over-nine double-hung sash. It is set off from the third story by a granite sill course without the terra cotta found on its counterpart below. Rising from it are round-arched nine-over-nine double-hung sash. A secondary entrance is located on the southeast, near the substation section.

Above them is another terra cotta belt course. The roof of the main building is flat, while the substation comes to a gable. Both buildings have parapets at their rooflines. The main building's is stepped along the north face and topped with granite coping. In the center is a large terra cotta-trimmed recessed panel. A similar, smaller stepped parapet along its gable sets off the roofline of the substation.

Windows on the east profile have a similar treatment. Those on the south and west, not visible from the street, are more restrained. They have bluestone sills; the roof has bluestone coping supported by unglazed terra cotta corbels.

=== Interior ===
Inside, the building has been converted from its original purpose of storing and repairing the city's trolleys to residential use. Tracks that remained in the building at the time it was listed on the Register have been removed. It has been subdivided into lofts of 1,100–1,500 square feet (100–140 m^{2}), some with 20-foot (6.1 m) ceilings.

Its original structural system for the upper stories is retained. They were supported by segmented terra cotta tiled arches spanning the spaces between the steel beams, connected by tie rods. Where they were exposed, they were parged. The roof has flat terra cotta slabs set in T-shaped steel purlins, supported by built-up trusses. The terra cotta arches are supplemented by built-up steel latticework columns.

=== Substation ===
The substation's east (front) facade has similar extruded brown brick as the main building over its steel frame, but laid in a stretcher bond pattern. Its base is rusticated granite laid in an ashlar pattern topped with a granite sill course.

On the first story it has a round-arched main entry flanked by two round-arched 9-over-15 double-hung sash windows. Above them another granite course, denticulated and projecting, separates the first and second stories. The windows on that story are also round-arched, with nine-over-nine double-hung sash. A terra cotta belt course separates that story and the parapet. More terra cotta forms the corbels below the parapet's granite coping. Atop the roof is a monitor with metal cornice covered by galvanized siding.

The interior has also been converted into loft apartments. Like the main building, its structural system includes terra cotta tiled roofs supported by steel trusses. An original mezzanine level was removed when the building was redeveloped.

== History ==
Until the 1840s, Yonkers was a quiet farming community that relied on the Hudson River to ship its produce the short distance south to New York City, its major market. Later in that decade, the construction of the Hudson River Railroad brought the city closer and allowed Yonkers to industrialize. By 1855 its population reached 5,000.

The growth continued after the Civil War, and Yonkers incorporated as a city in 1872. To allow the workers who had moved to the city to more easily get to their jobs at plants like the Alexander Smith Carpet Mills, some distance from downtown, the city commissioned the Yonkers Railroad Company to develop a trolley system. It opened in 1886.

Initially it ran just along Main Street through Getty Square, but it soon needed to be expanded to the rest of the city. In the 1890s it was electrified. The Third Avenue Railway Company, operators of streetcars along that street in Manhattan and elsewhere in the region, bought the Yonkers Railroad Company in 1898.

Five years later, in 1903, the trolley barn was built to serve as a storage and maintenance facility as well as the company's office. City newspapers of the time hailed its construction as a sign that Yonkers, whose population had increased almost tenfold from the middle of the century as it became as much as suburb as an industrial community, had arrived as a city.

Little is known about the building's credited architect, Albert V. Porter, although it is believed he was a native of the city. His work combines standard Renaissance Revival decorative features such as the coping and the unusual iron-spotted brick with the trolley company's considerable functional requirements, taking advantage of the unusual lot shape and its southward slope.

Trolleys entered and exited through the garage doors at the northwest corner. Tracks throughout the building branched out to allow them to be stored and repaired. An elevator in the rear could bring them up to additional space on the second floor, part of which was devoted to the company's offices as well as reading and recreation rooms. The third floor was devoted entirely to trolley storage and maintenance. At the trolley system's peak the barn serviced 85 cars.

The barn helped the trolley network grow with the city to nine lines total. It made connections with other Third Avenue Railway System lines such as across the county in Mount Vernon. The Broadway lines connected to the New York City Subway's Broadway–Seventh Avenue line at the Van Cortlandt Park—242nd Street station in the Bronx, their southern terminus and the subway's northern end.

By 1911 it was carrying over 14 million passengers a year. It spread over the city, helping Yonkers suburbanize as residents who could afford to begin moving from the industrial downtown to former farm properties that were being subdivided into residential building lots. In 1922 the trolleys were carrying 70,000 passengers a day over 53 miles (85 km) of track.

Some changes were made to the original building. The entrance along Buena Vista near the southeast corner was added. The openings at the northwest corner were rebuilt and expanded, and the cast iron piers added.

Private automobiles became more affordable and more common in the years after that, and trolley systems began closing down in favor of buses during the 1930s. The Yonkers Railroad Company continued to operate until 1953. Its tracks were torn up and the cars sold, but the barn remained. The city's Street Lighting Bureau moved into the offices and remained there until 1975.

The effects of spreading out the city's population became more apparent in the last quarter of the 20th century. With most of the city's more prosperous citizens not living there anymore, they had less interest in maintaining a healthy downtown. When the industries that were still located there moved elsewhere or closed, urban decay became apparent. At the time it was listed on the Register, in 2001, most of the long-vacant trolley barn's windows were boarded up.

The city made restoring the trolley barn its top priority for revitalizing its downtown. Early in the 21st century, the building got some visibility when its exteriors were used as the background for a chase scene in the film Catch Me If You Can. Shortly afterward the rebuilding began as a developer bought the barn and began converting it to loft apartments. It opened in the mid-2000s, with a local firefighter and artist its first tenant.

The project soon fell victim to lawsuits between the four partners who had redeveloped it. Tenants waited as amenities they had been promised such as a gym and laundry room remained unbuilt. "We were in a warehouse," complained the firefighter who had pioneered the space. In 2009 Metro Partnership bought the trolley barn and began completing it under the name Metro92. Rents climbed, but the tenants, mostly artists, were grateful that long-promised improvements were materializing.

In 2014, the Yonkers Brewing Company announced that it would be moving into the Trolley Barn. One reason cited was access to the intermodal transit hub in the Getty Square neighborhood, especially the access to the Metro-North commuter rail station. It hoped to attract an increasing amount of beer tourists from the city who use trains to travel between breweries.

== See also ==
- National Register of Historic Places listings in Yonkers, New York
