= PPAC =

The acronym PPAC may refer to:

- Providence Performing Arts Center, multi-use theatre in Providence, Rhode Island
- People With Parkinson's Advisory Council, a committee of people with Parkinson's Disease
- Philipsburgh Performing Arts Center, former name of the Philipsburgh Building in Yonkers, New York.
