= United States Post Office (Yonkers, New York) =

- U.S. Post Office
- U.S. National Register of Historic Places
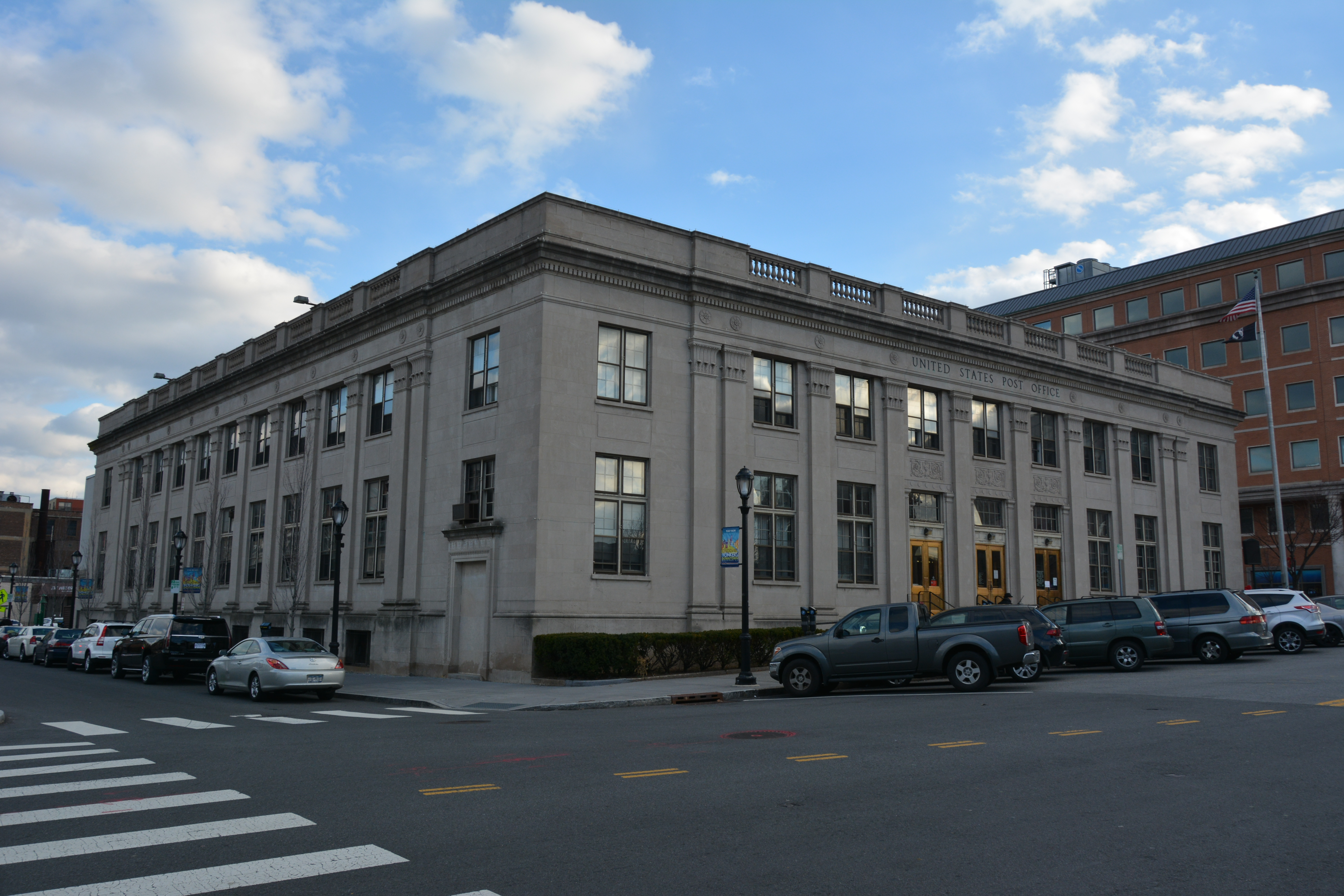
- South profile and west elevation, 2014

- Location within New York Location within the United States
- Interactive map showing the location of U.S. Post Office Yonkers
- Location: Yonkers, NY
- Coordinates: 40°56′6″N 73°54′7″W
- Area: less than one acre
- Built: 1927
- Architect: James Wetmore
- Architectural style: Classical Revival
- MPS: US Post Offices in New York State, 1858-1943, TR
- NRHP reference No.: 88002448
- Added to NRHP: May 11, 1989

The U.S. Post Office for Yonkers, New York, is located on Main Street downtown, opposite the city's train station. It is a two-story stone building erected in the late 1920s. It is located in the 10702 ZIP Code, but serves the entire city, which has other ZIP codes between 10701 and 10710. In 1989 it was listed on the National Register of Historic Places, along with many other historic post offices in the state.

Secretary of the Treasury William Gibbs McAdoo personally chose the site. The building is one of many of those designed by the Treasury Department's Office of the Supervising Architect under James A. Wetmore. Since it was located in a growing city, it is larger than most other post offices built around the same time. In its Classical Revival design hints of the emerging Art Deco style can be seen. It remains largely intact today.

== Building ==
The post office building occupies the block between Main Street on the south, Buena Vista Avenue on the east, Nepperhan Street on the north and Market Place to the east. The terrain is level, reflecting the proximity of the Hudson River to the west just beyond the railroad tracks used by Amtrak and Metro-North's Hudson Line. The 1911 Beaux-Arts main building of the Yonkers train station is to the northwest. On the north, the square has a small park at its center, yielding to a parking lot on the northeast. The city's new library building is across the square, in buildings once used by the Otis Elevator Company.

To the east, the two blocks between Market and Riverdale Avenue (U.S. Route 9 and New York State Route 9A) have dense urban development consisting of multistory commercial buildings from the late 19th and early 20th centuries. Philipse Manor Hall State Historic Site, a National Historic Landmark, is a block to their north. South and southeast are larger, more modern office buildings. The Yonkers Trolley Barn, also on the National Register and now remodeled into apartments, is on the southwest.

=== Exterior ===
There is a flagpole on the southwest corner of the block. Narrow hedges on all but the east side set off the building. The building itself is a two-story steel frame structure faced on all sides by smooth buff limestone topped by a flat roof. Those facades form a roughly square building with the exception of the irregular east. They are 15 bays wide on the south (Main Street) side, 13 on Market Street, 11 on Nepperhan and nine on Buena Vista. Atop is a flat roof.

Exterior decorative features

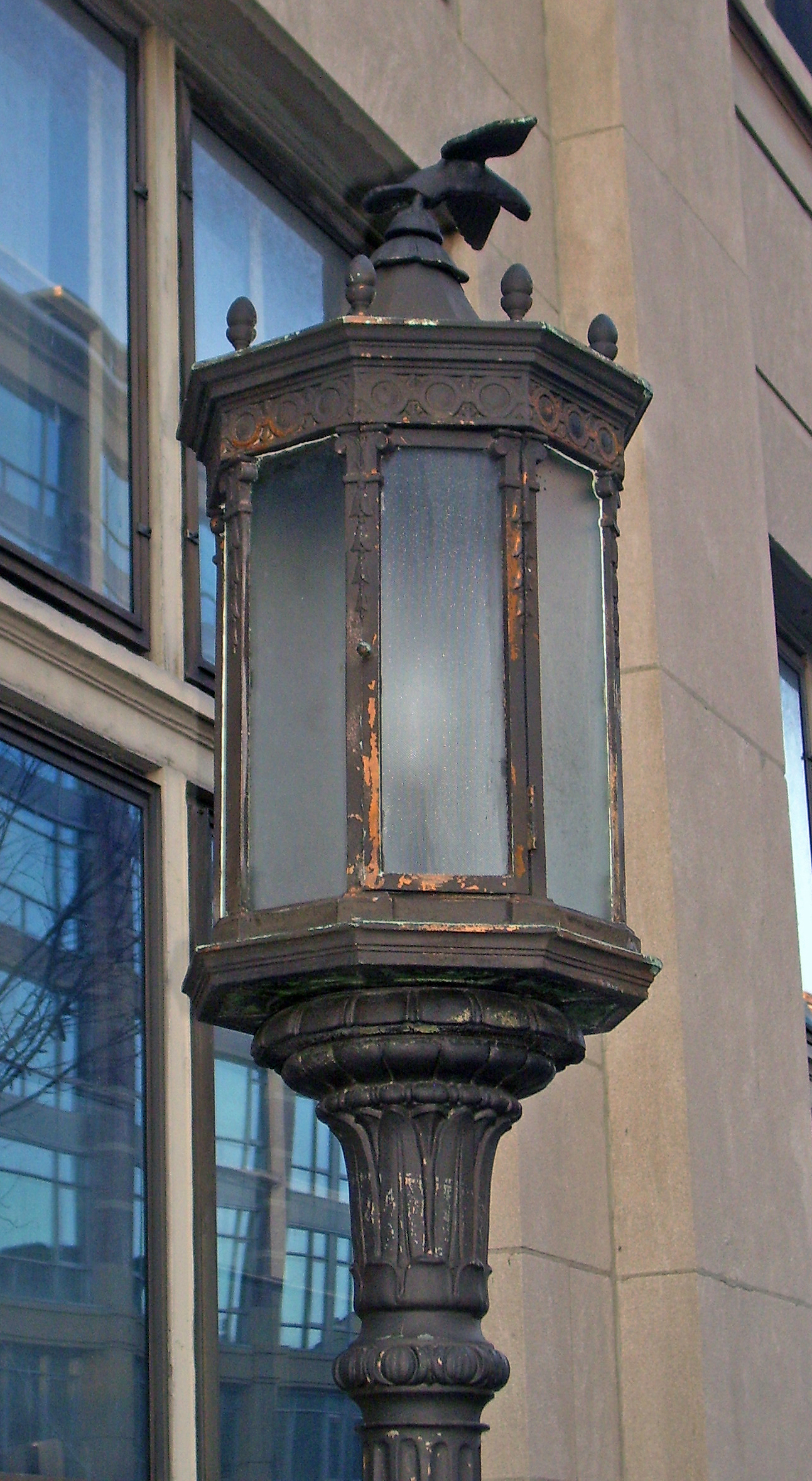
Entrance lamppost

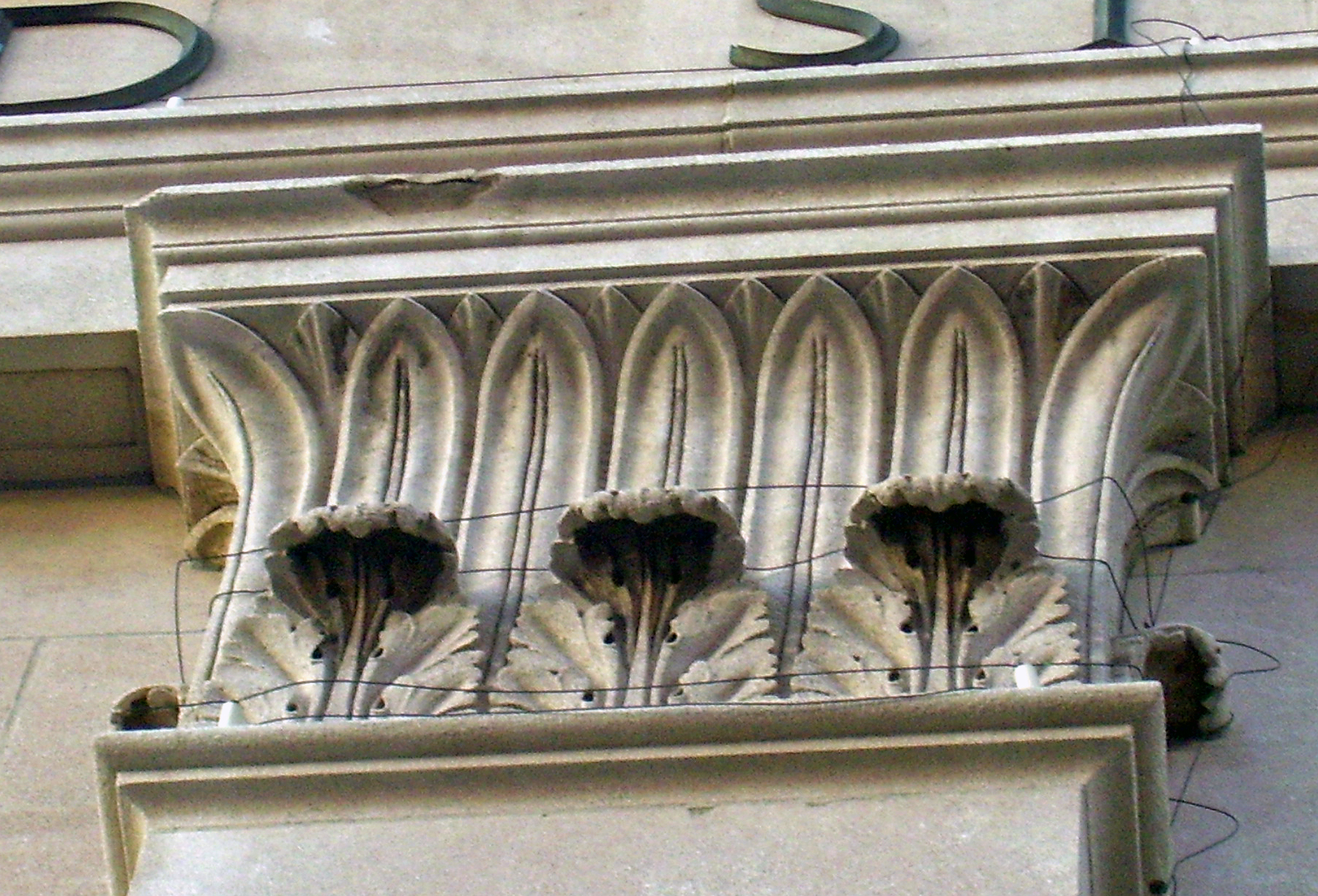
Pilaster capital

With the exception of the east, which serves as a loading dock, all facades have a similar decorative treatment: flat engaged Corinthian pilasters dividing all bays save those on the corners, which are set off on the non-corner side by paired pilasters. All support an entablature with a frieze decorated with curved rosettes. At the roofline is a denticulated cornice with a balustraded parapet. On the first story, windows are four-over-four double-hung sash with a four-light transom. The second story has similar windows but without the transoms.

The west and south facades have centrally located entrances, with steps on the former due to the slight grade. They take up three bays each, with original bronze lampposts on either side. Each bay has a bronze double door flanked by engaged fluted pilasters and topped with a ten-light transom. Above it is a lintel with geometric designs and a foliate relief carving. In the first bay of the north facade and the second-to-last bay of the east facade is an additional single-bay entrance with similar treatment; the former is no longer in use.

A large covered loading platform runs the full width of the first story of the Market Street facade on the east. The central three bays have garage doors built into the wall to allow trucks to unload directly to the indoors; the outer three on both sides have platforms. Above them is a second story with the same window treatment as found elsewhere on the building.

=== Interior ===
Both entrances lead through bronze vestibules to an L-shaped lobby with its original terrazzo floors and buff marble wainscoting. Flat marble Corinthian pilasters, also buff, rise on both the inside and outside walls to the coffered plaster ceiling divided by beams at each bay. Low-relief decoration is on almost every surface.

On the outside wall are oak bulletin boards framed by marble. The oak customer tables are original. An open L-shaped staircase with marble steps and a brass banister leads up to the second floor. On the interior wall, lockboxes and teller windows delineate the work areas of the post office. Behind them is the workroom. Upstairs are offices and the swing room, with the basement given over to mechanical rooms and storage.

== History ==
=== Context ===
Yonkers began receiving mail regularly when the Albany Post Road was completed shortly after the Revolution. At that time it was delivered to Philipse Manor, a short distance from the location of the present building. In 1788 mail began being delivered to Old Hunt's Tavern nearby; it was replaced nine years later, in 1797, by the first official post office in the country store of Yonkers' first postmaster, Alpheus Pierson, on the block where the current building is. In 1863 free delivery began.

In the late 19th century Yonkers began growing rapidly. At first it was due to industrialization, spurred by the completion of the Hudson River Railroad in 1849. Many were textile mills, but there were others, such as the Otis Elevator Company, which had set up shop in the city in 1854. Yonkers became a city in 1872.

The postmaster's job soon became politicized, a patronage position awarded to those who had kept Westchester County's political leaders in power. This was true in many of the communities but even more so in Yonkers due to the volume of mail. Politicians would hold their informal meetings there, in the postmaster's office out of public view, and call other postmasters there if they failed in their political duties.

This practice led to the appointment of postmasters who were incompetent at or cared little about the operations of their office and the delivery of mail. In 1905 an especially incompetent postmaster and his assistant were fired after much public anger over the poor quality of postal service in the city. President Theodore Roosevelt personally appointed, on an interim basis, John Parsons, a New York City customs agent. He told the local politicians who complained that Parsons had only lived in Yonkers for three months and was not yet registered to vote there that they had no credibility with him.

Parsons took his job very seriously, and within a short time vastly improved Yonkers' mail service. Roosevelt later gave him a full four-year commission. When it expired in 1909, however, Roosevelt was no longer president. Despite having made no accommodation to the politicians who had controlled his predecessors, he sought reappointment. The city's Republican chairman declined to do so, publicly recalling how he had been appointed in flagrant disregard of their input. Instead a recently defeated mayoral candidate got the job. Citizens rallied to keep Parsons, to no avail.

As the century ended, Yonkers began to grow even more due to suburban development, as wealthy residents of New York City to the south realized they could live in larger houses in more pastoral surroundings and still take the train every day to their jobs and businesses in the city. A new post office was needed, and in 1906 Congress passed the first of several laws authorizing its construction. It was not until 1916 that the actual land could be purchased, and over the next three years the federal government spent $322,500 ($5.99 million in modern dollars) buying the land and the buildings on it, which included not only the old post office and its telegraph building but a hotel, store, junkyard and gasometer.

The location of the planned new post office was personally chosen by Treasury Secretary William Gibbs McAdoo, a onetime resident of Yonkers, on a tour of the site with Rep. Woodson R. Oglesby. McAdoo cited its proximity to both the railroad and the city's trolley lines. Actual construction had to wait until Congress reauthorized it in the Public Buildings Act of 1926. The original budget was raised to $520,000 ($9.64 million in modern dollars) and the building was completed one year later, in 1927.

=== Completed post office ===
The completed post office was larger than most others built in New York around the same time, most of which were smaller brick buildings in the Colonial Revival architectural style. Yonkers' large and growing population necessitated a correspondingly large post office, and like other larger urban New York post offices of the time, such as those in Potsdam and Wellsville, the Classical Revival mode was preferred. James A. Wetmore, Supervising Architect at the Treasury Department, is credited with the design, as he is with many other federal buildings during his 18 years as Supervising Architect. He was, however, a political appointee and lawyer with no architectural training; that was generally left to Louis A. Simon, the office's Superintendent of Architects, who succeeded Wetmore and served until the position was abolished in 1939.

Yonkers's post office is distinguished by its massing, which creates a monumentality reinforced by the pilasters around the facade. It is offset by the restrained relief, repetition of forms and smooth flat surfaces, features typical of the Classical Revival during that period, which convey both the dignity of a government building and the economizing the government was undertaking at the time. They also anticipate the Art Deco stylings that would become more prominent in later post offices like the main one on Staten Island, completed in 1931.

There have been a few small changes to the building since 1927. Most noticeably, the loading dock area has been altered slightly. Since the building was listed, its central portion, once sided in yellow brick, now matches the limestone on the rest of the building. On the north facade, the Nepperhan Street entrance has been closed off so that an office could be built next to it. In the lobby, some of the teller windows have been altered and the original lighting replaced. Otherwise, all furniture and finishes are original.

== See also ==
- National Register of Historic Places listings in Yonkers, New York
