= Ludlow station (Metro-North) =

Metro-North Railroad station in New York

Ludlow
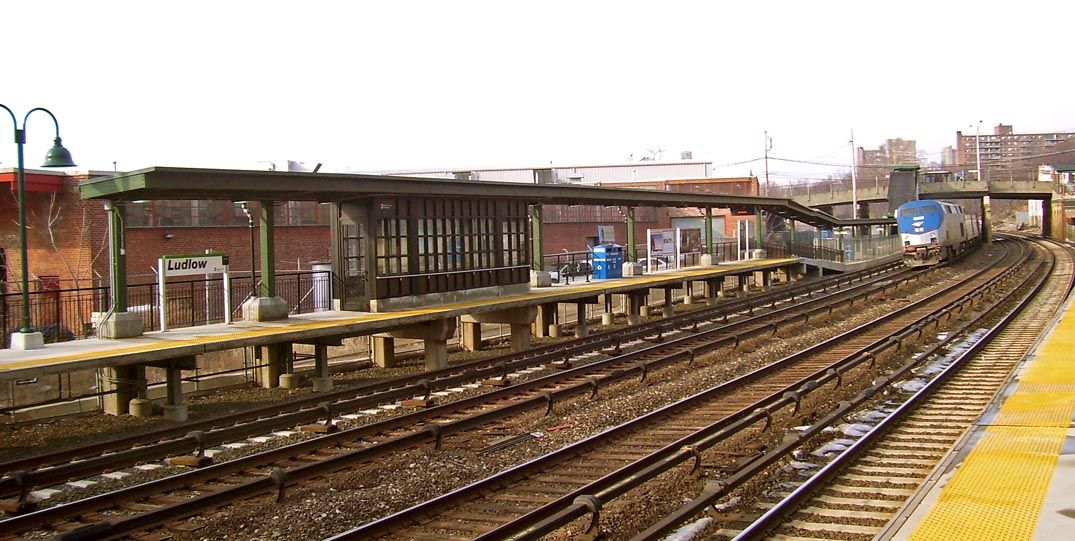
- An Amtrak train bypasses Ludlow on one of the express tracks

General information
- Location: 180 Ludlow Street; Yonkers, New York
- Coordinates: 40.9238°N 73.9056°W
- Line: Hudson Line (Metro-North)
- Platforms: 2 side platforms
- Tracks: 5
- Connections: Bee-Line Bus System: 8, 32

Construction
- Accessible: Northbound platform only

Other information
- Fare zone: 3

Passengers
- 2018: 440 (Metro-North)
- Rank: 78 of 109

Services
| Preceding station | Metro-North Railroad | Following station |
|---|---|---|
| Yonkers toward Croton–Harmon | Hudson Line | Riverdale toward Grand Central |

Former services
| Preceding station | New York Central Railroad | Following station |
|---|---|---|
| Yonkers toward Peekskill | Hudson Division | Mt. St. Vincent toward New York |
Location

Ludlow station is a commuter rail stop on the Metro-North Railroad's Hudson Line, located in the Ludlow Park neighborhood of Yonkers, New York. As of August 2006, daily commuter ridership was 250 and there are 33 parking spaces.

== Station layout ==
The station has two offset high-level side platform platforms each eight cars long. An additional track is located west of the southbound platform and is used by freight trains.

Both platforms are canopied full length and have a ramp at their extreme north ends that lead to a passageway at track level (fences separating them from the tracks) before a staircase goes up to Ludlow Street, which crosses above the line. Ticket vending machines are on the overpass. The northbound platform's walkway is part of the sidewalk of Abe Cohen Plaza, a turn-around street that also serves as the station's parking lot.
