= St. John's Protestant Episcopal Church (Yonkers, New York) =

Historic church in New York, United States

St. John's Church, Getty Square
- St. John's Protestant Episcopal Church
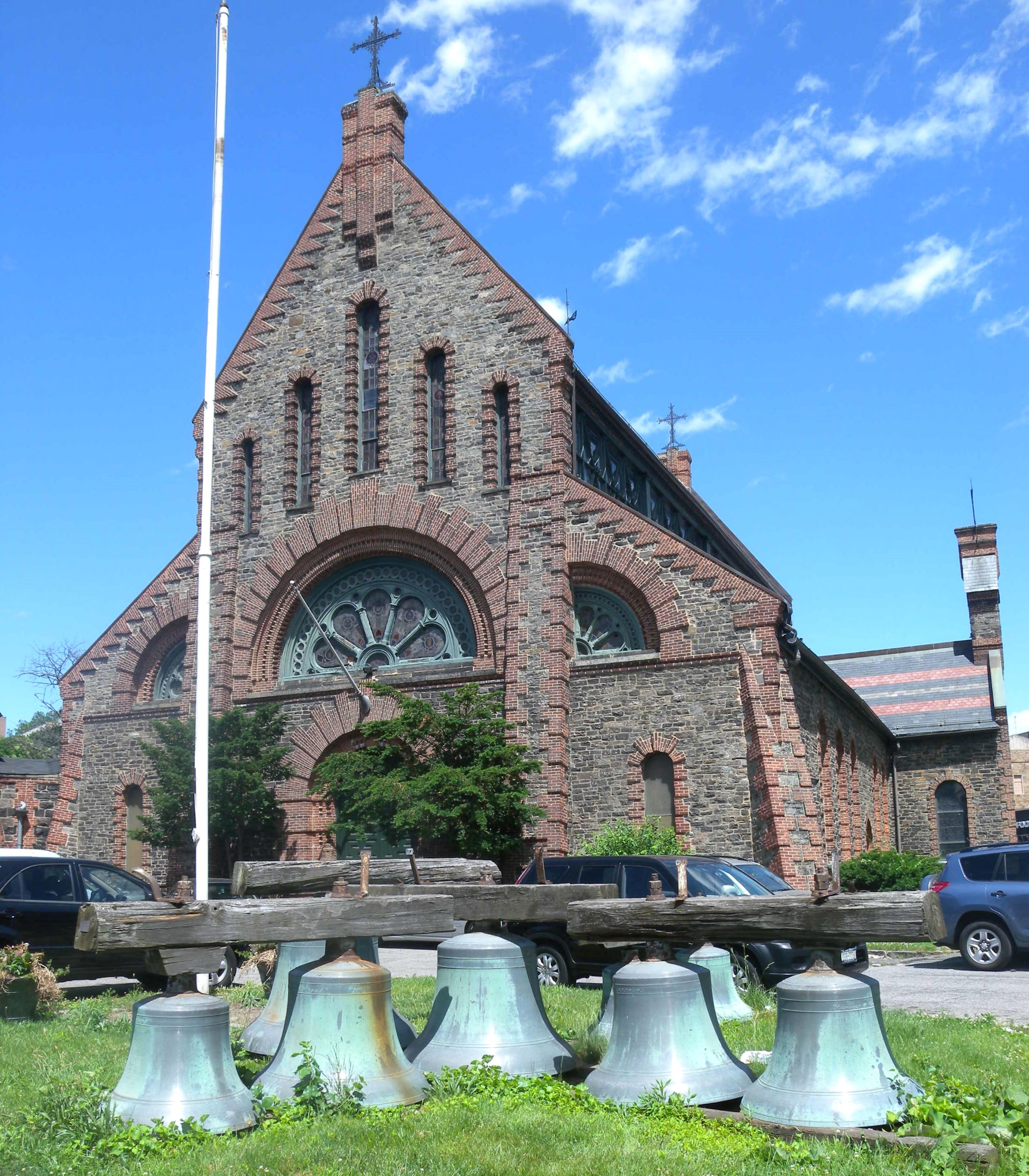
- St. John's Church, Getty Square
- 40°56′1″N 73°53′56″W
- Location: 1 Hudson Street, Yonkers, New York
- Country: United States
- Denomination: Episcopal Church

Architecture
- Architect(s): Edward T. Potter (church redesign); R. H. Robertson (additional buildings)
- Style: Richardsonian Romanesque
- Years built: 1752 (original structure); 1874 (church redesign); 1891 (additional buildings)

Administration
- Province: Atlantic
- Diocese: New York
- Deanery: Westchester Hudson South
- St. John's Episcopal Church
- U.S. National Register of Historic Places
- New York State Register of Historic Places
- NRHP reference No.: 82003418
- NYSRHP No.: 11940.001397

Significant dates
- Added to NRHP: July 29, 1982
- Designated NYSRHP: June 23, 1982

St. John's Protestant Episcopal Church, commonly known as St. John's Church, Getty Square, is a historic Episcopal church located at 1 Hudson Street in the Getty Square neighborhood of Yonkers, Westchester County, New York. The complex includes the main church, in addition to a chapel, rectory, and school.

The original church was constructed in 1752 by Frederick Philipse III, the third lord of Philipsburg Manor, a short distance from the family Manor Hall. It was built of locally quarried rough gray fieldstone, accented with red-brick quoins. In 1791, the roof, interior woodwork, and steeple of the church were destroyed by a fire. The building was renovated the next year and consecrated as St John’s Church, Philipsburgh; this was the first time the name was used.

As Yonkers was growing and becoming an industrial city, an extension was added to the building in 1849. Still, a much larger church building was needed for the growing congregation. The church was significantly rebuilt and enlarged in 1874 by architect Edward Tuckerman Potter. At the insistence of the church vestry, he incorporated into the new design elements of the old one: one wall of the old church was preserved and built into the new church. Its round-arched windows and doorway became models for those in the new building. This combination of different styles created a striking, very individual design.

The building has a cruciform layout and a slate-covered gable roof. The front facade features a half-round rose window, two quarter-round rose windows, and four battered buttresses. The basic form of the church, with its tall nave and high-pitched roof, is typical of the Gothic Revival style, but its round-arched windows and doorways, "inherited" from the original church, use Georgian architectural elements, with a decidedly Dutch colonial influence.

The chapel, as well as the adjacent 2 1/2-story rectory, were constructed in 1890–1891 and are connected to the church by a series of additional rooms and covered walkways, all added by architect R. H. Robertson.

During the American Revolutionary War, the church served as a field hospital for both sides. An exterior plaque honors "all American Revolution soldiers buried in Saint John's Church Cemetery" (the church cemetery is adjacent to Oakland Cemetery, located at Saw Mill River Road and Axminster Street). Inside the church, there is a memorial plaque for Reverend Luke Babcock, the rector from 1770 to 1777 who was a Loyalist arrested by Patriots.

The church was added to the New York State Register of Historic Places in June 1982, with the entire church complex added to the National Register the following month.
