= Municipal Credit Union =

Credit union in New York City

- Type: Credit union
- Industry: Financial services
- Founded: 1916
- Headquarters: New York City, New York, United States
- Key people: Kyle Markland, President/CEO
- Products: Savings; checking; consumer loans; mortgages; credit cards; online banking
- Total assets: $2.68B USD (2018)
- Number of employees: 568
- Website: nymcu.org

Municipal Credit Union (MCU) is a state chartered credit union headquartered in New York City, regulated under the authority of the National Credit Union Administration (NCUA). MCU is metro New York's largest credit union. As of 2018, MCU had $2.68 billion in assets. It has approximately 425,000 members and 18 branches.

== History ==
Municipal Credit Union was founded in 1916 for municipal workers in New York City. John Purroy Mitchel, New York City's Mayor at the time, wanted city employees to have alternatives to loan sharks and encouraged the chartering of the organization.

On November 2, 1977, the New York State Banking Department took over MCU for a brief time, citing loan delinquencies and corruption of Board members.

In 1986, following the collapse of Hyfin Credit Union amidst charges of fraud and embezzlement, Hyfin was merged with Municipal Credit Union.

A computer error in 2001 after the September 11 attacks allowed credit union members to withdraw amounts in excess of their accounts. In the month following the attacks, $15 million was stolen from MCU ATMs by its own members. 118 members were charged in the thefts.

CEO Kam Wong was placed on leave in February 2018 and arrested for embezzlement and fraud later that year in May when the credit union was placed in conservatorship. For at least five years, Wong had been participating in insurance fraud and cash embezzlement through MCU's ATMs, and spent millions of dollars of this cash on lottery tickets.

On November 19, 2018 Kam Wong, pled guilty in Manhattan federal court to embezzling millions of dollars from the Credit Union and was sentenced to five and a half years in prison.

MCU was released from conservatorship in February 2022.
