= Philipsburgh Building =

Historic commercial building in New York, United States

- U.S. National Register of Historic Places
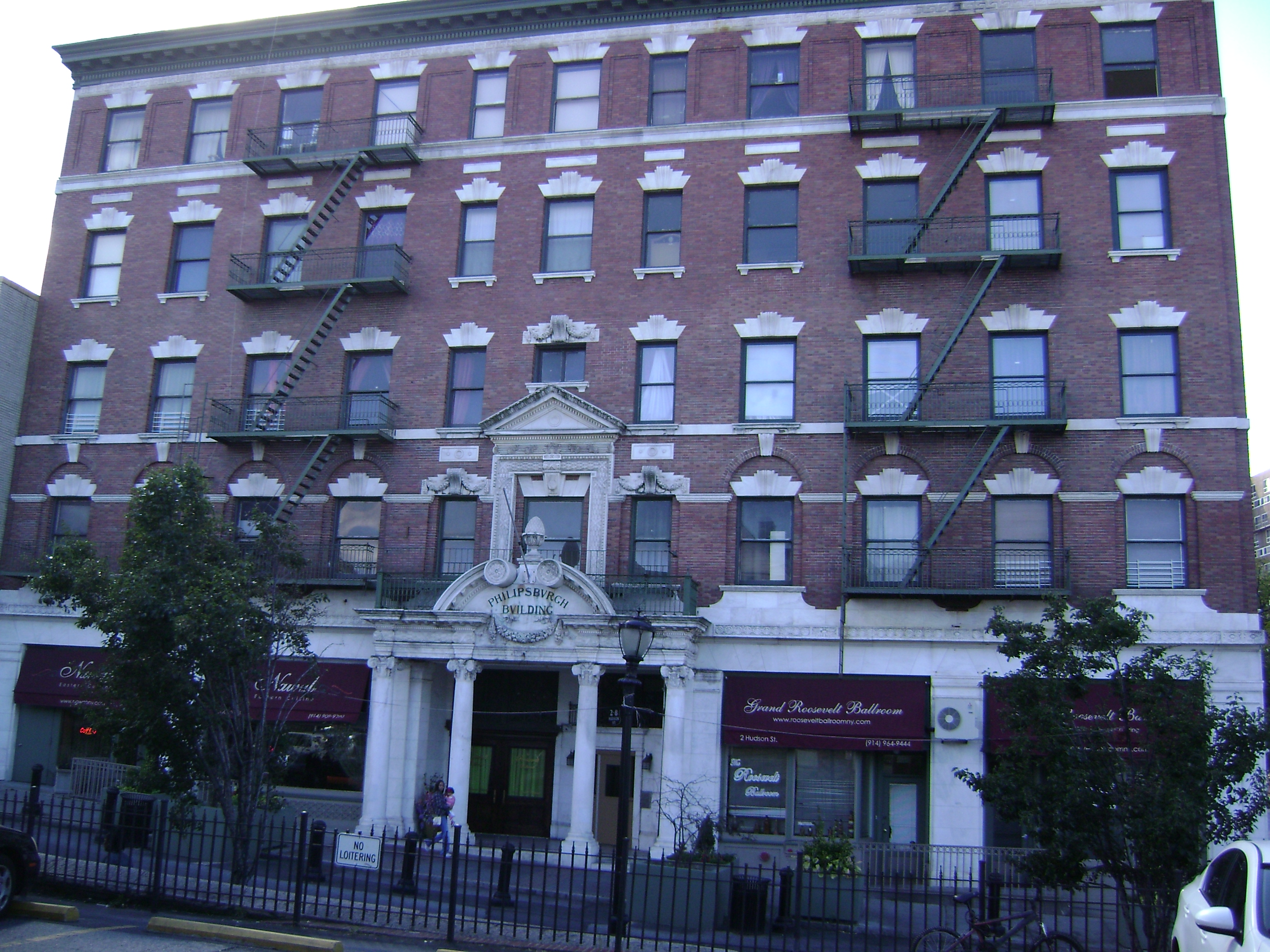

- Location within New York Location within the United States
- Location: 2-8 Hudson St., Yonkers, New York
- Coordinates: 40°55′59.5″N 73°53′58″W
- Area: less than one acre
- Built: 1904
- Architect: G. Howard Chamberlin
- Architectural style: Italian Renaissance
- NRHP reference No.: 02000552
- Added to NRHP: May 22, 2002

The Philipsburgh Building, also known as Philipsburgh Hall, is an architectural landmark building in Getty Square in downtown Yonkers, New York. It is named after the colonial-era Philipsburg Manor estate and is located one block from the Philipse Manor Hall State Historic Site. The grand, Beaux-Arts style structure was designed by G. Howard Chamberlin and built in 1904 using a unique all-concrete construction making it the first fireproof office building in Westchester County. For years, the enormous grand ballroom within, with its 30-foot (9.1 m) ceilings and extensive gold leaf decor, was a fixture of the social scene in Yonkers, playing host to all manner of meetings, parties and theatrical productions including speeches by Theodore and Franklin D. Roosevelt (resulting in its being named "The Roosevelt Ballroom" by Encore Caterers.

In the latter half of the 20th century, the building and the neighborhood around it fell into physical and economic disrepair. By the 1980s, most of the building had been converted to low-rent apartments, while parts of it were left entirely unoccupied. In the 1990s, the building benefited from a renewed interest in local development, and was heavily renovated and restored. The grand "Roosevelt" ballroom once again found its place as a focal point of local culture.

The building was restored and renamed the Philipsburgh Performing Arts Center (PPAC, pronounced "P-pack" locally) in 2001. The PPAC concept was short-lived, however, and by early 2005 it had ceased to be. The building's primary occupant is a South Asian restaurant called "Nawab" and its owners are also the caterers for events at the Ballroom.

It was listed on the National Register of Historic Places in 2001.
