= Yonkers station =

Train station in Yonkers, New York, US

Yonkers
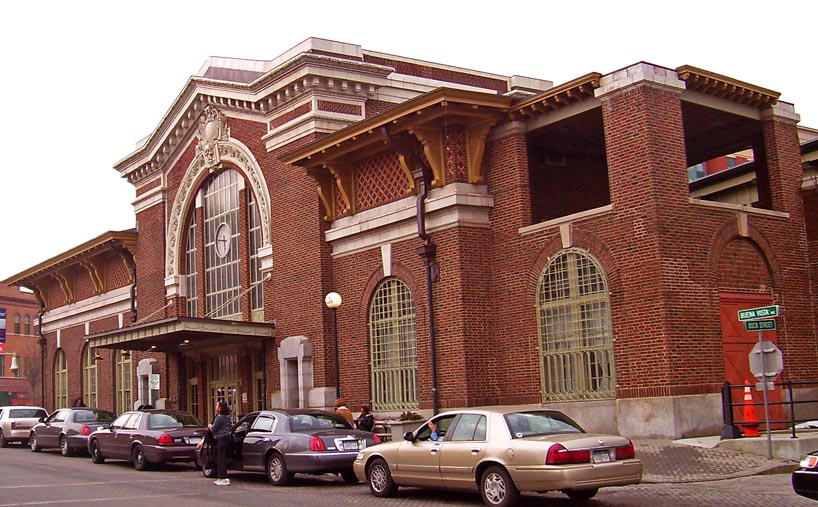
- Main entrance to the station, facing downtown Yonkers

General information
- Location: 5 Buena Vista Avenue; Yonkers, New York; United States
- Coordinates: 40.9356°N 73.9023°W
- Owner: Metro-North Railroad
- Line: Hudson Line
- Platforms: 2 island platforms
- Tracks: 4
- Connections: Bee-Line Bus System: 1, 3, 4, 5, 6, 7, 8, 9, 25, 30, 32, 78

Construction
- Accessible: Yes

Other information
- Station code: Amtrak: YNY; Via Rail: YONK
- Fare zone: 3 (Metro-North)

History
- Rebuilt: August 1912; 2004

Passengers
- FY 2025: 47,156 (Amtrak)
- 2018: 2,221 (Metro-North)
Services
| Preceding station | Amtrak | Following station |
|---|---|---|
| Croton–Harmon toward Montreal | Adirondack | New York Terminus |
| Croton–Harmon toward Pittsfield | Berkshire Flyer (seasonal) | New York Terminus |
| Croton–Harmon toward Niagara Falls, New York | Empire Service | New York Terminus |
| Croton–Harmon toward Burlington | Ethan Allen Express | New York Terminus |
| Croton–Harmon toward Toronto | Maple Leaf | New York Terminus |
Lake Shore Limited does not stop here
| Preceding station | Metro-North Railroad | Following station |
| Glenwood toward Croton–Harmon | Hudson Line | Ludlow toward Grand Central |
Former services
| Preceding station | New York Central Railroad | Following station |
|---|---|---|
| Tarrytown toward Chicago | Main Line | 138th Street toward New York |
| Glenwood toward Peekskill | Hudson Division | Ludlow toward New York |
Location

Yonkers station is a Metro-North Railroad and Amtrak railroad station located near Getty Square in Yonkers, New York. It is served by Metro-North Hudson Line commuter rail service and five Amtrak intercity services. The station building was constructed in 1911–1912, replacing an older structure.

== History ==
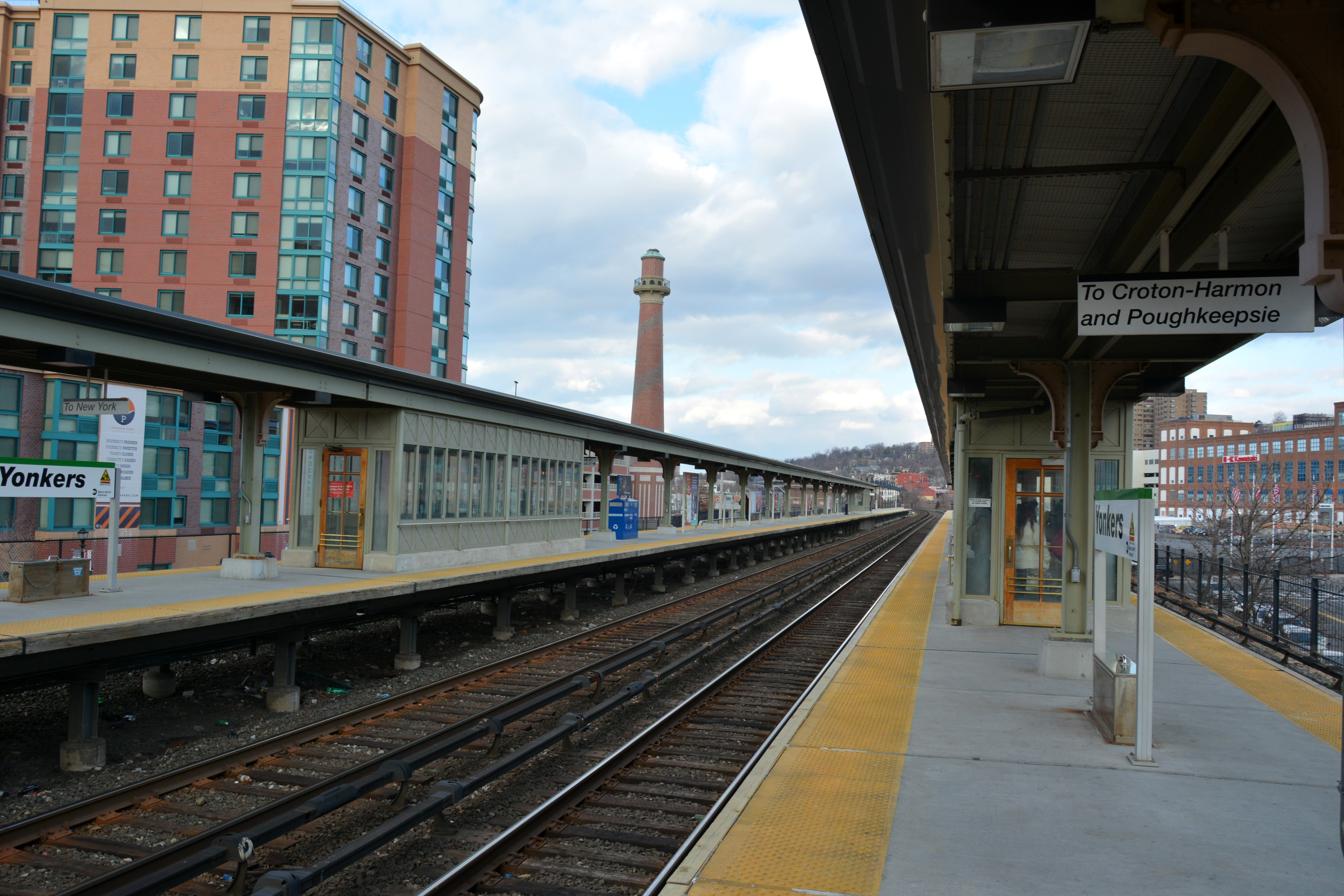
Platforms at Yonkers station

The current station building was built in 1911 for the New York Central & Hudson River Railroad (NYC) in the Beaux-Arts style. The architects were Warren and Wetmore, one of the firms responsible for Grand Central Terminal. It was meant to be a smaller version of Grand Central; Guastavino tiles are featured prominently in both stations.

Upon the merger of the NYC and the Pennsylvania Railroad in 1968, the station became a Penn Central commuter rail station. By this time, intercity service to Yonkers had ended. Penn Central continued operating commuter travel until 1976, when it was taken over by Conrail, which in turn transferred the service to Metro-North in 1983. Intercity service returned to Yonkers in 1989 after a two-decade absence in an effort to revitalize the Saw Mill riverfront. In 2004, Metro-North completed a $43 million restoration of the Yonkers station.

The ticket office at the station closed on July 7, 2010, so that passengers must now buy their tickets from vending machines at street level. A Metro-North Railroad Police substation is in the terminal on the ground floor.

Amtrak's Berkshire Flyer began running on July 8, 2022, providing direct service to Pittsfield on summer weekends.

== Station layout ==
The station has two high-level island platforms, each 10 cars long, serving the four-track line. Metro-North trains use all four tracks, while Amtrak trains generally use the inner tracks.
