= New York State Route 121 =

State highway in the Hudson Valley of New York, US

New York State Route 121
- Map of southeastern New York with NY 121 highlighted in red

Route information
- Maintained by NYSDOT
- Length: 15.56 mi (25.04 km)
- Existed: 1930–present

Major junctions
- South end: NY 22 in Bedford
- NY 35 in Lewisboro; I-84 in Southeast
- North end: US 6 / US 202 in Southeast

Location
- Country: United States
- State: New York
- Counties: Westchester, Putnam

Highway system
- New York Highways; Interstate; US; State; Reference; Parkways
← NY 120A	→ NY 122

New York State Route 121 (NY 121) is a north–south state highway in the Hudson Valley of New York, United States. It begins in northern Westchester County at an intersection with NY 22 in Bedford and extends for 15.56 miles (25.04 km) to a junction with U.S. Route 6 and U.S. Route 202 (US 6 and US 202) east of the village of Brewster in Putnam County. As the route heads north, it briefly overlaps with NY 35 and NY 116 in Westchester County and connects to Interstate 84 (I-84) in Putnam County. NY 121 was assigned as part of the 1930 renumbering of state highways in New York.

== Route description ==
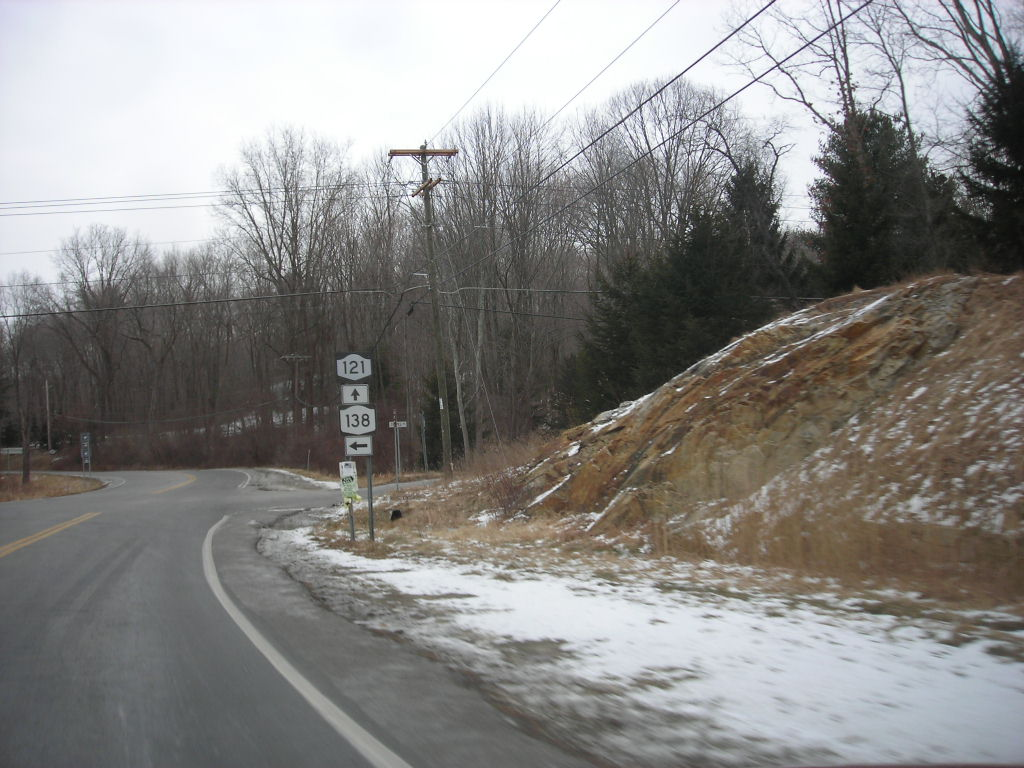
NY 121 northbound at the junction with NY 138 in Lewisboro

NY 121 begins at a junction with NY 22 (Cantitoe Street) in the hamlet of Bedford Village, just north of the junction with NY 172. The route proceeds northeast out of Bedford Village, crossing through the town of Bedford and over the Stone Hill River. Winding northeast and soon north through the dense woodlands of Bedford, NY 121 reaches a junction with the northern terminus of NY 137 (Stone Hill Road). The route winds north through Bedford as a two-lane road past Pea Pond before reaching the southern end of the Cross River Reservoir. Just after the junction with Upper Hook Road, NY 121 crosses over the southern extremities of the reservoir, crossing into the town of Pound Ridge.

Now in Pound Ridge, NY 121 runs along a small branch of the Cross River Reservoir, crossing into the town of Lewisboro and gaining the moniker of Cross River Road. The route soon enters the hamlet of Cross River, where it meets the namesake river, reaching a junction with NY 35. NY 35 and NY 121 become concurrent, crossing northeast through the hamlet before reaching Cross River Plaza, where the routes fork. Leaving Cross River, NY 121 continues north through Lewisboro, returning to the dense woodlands. After passing west of Waccabuc, the route reaches a junction with the terminus of NY 138 just before crossing the town line from Lewisboro into North Salem.

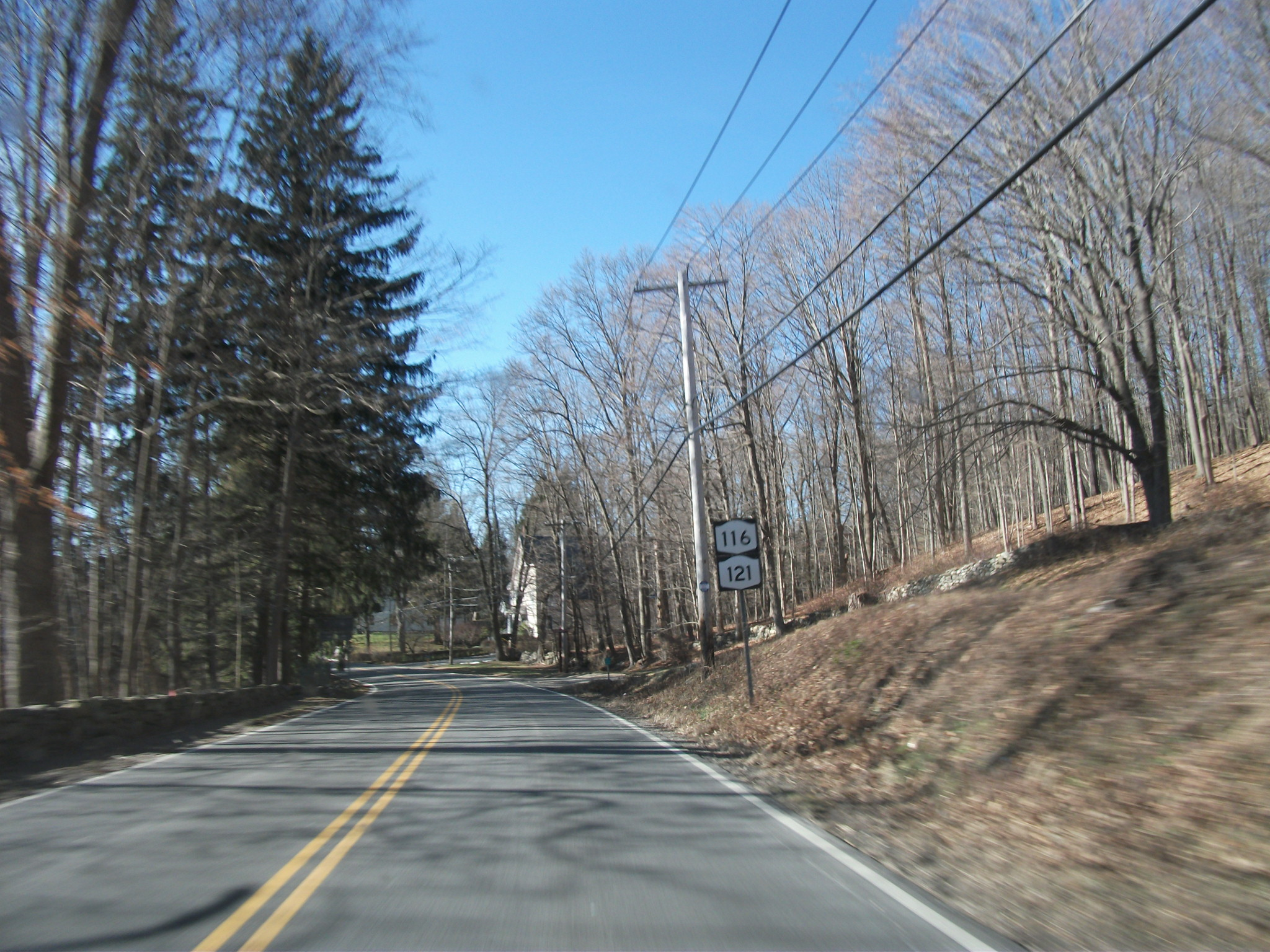
NY 121 and NY 116 through North Salem

NY 121 winds northeast through North Salem, gaining the moniker of Grant Road, soon reaching the hamlet of Grant Corner. Here, the route intersects with June Road (unsigned County Route 310 or CR 310). Beginning a parallel with the Titicus River, NY 121 soon reaches a junction with NY 116, which become concurrent as NY 121 bypasses the hamlet of North Salem. At the junction with Peach Lake Road, NY 116 continues east on Titicus Road while NY 121 turns north on Peach Lake. Continuing north through North Salem, NY 121 begins running to the east of Peach Lake, retaining the Peach Lake Road name until reaching the Putnam County line in the hamlet of Peach Lake.

Now in the town of Southeast, NY 121 runs alongside the Vail's Grove Golf Course and soon into exit 69, a pair of ramps from I-84. Just north of the I-84 interchange, NY 121 terminates at an intersection with US 6 and US 202 in front of the East Branch Reservoir.

== History ==
The alignment of NY 121 between Bedford Village to Stone Hill Road (modern NY 137), was first described in 1718 as a public highway through the town of Bedford. The alignment of modern Cross River Road soon would be designated as Post Road.

The section of NY 121 in Westchester County was first improved to state highway standards as part of three separate projects contracted out by the state of New York in 1903. South of NY 35, the road was rebuilt under a contract awarded on July 19 and added to the state highway system on June 12, 1905, as part of State Highway 144 (SH 144). The remainder of the route in the county was reconstructed as part of contracts let on June 14 and June 19, with the former covering the segment between the west end of the NY 35 overlap and NY 138. The roads improved by both projects were accepted into the state highway system on December 21 and 26, 1907, as SH 150 and SH 151, respectively. All three state highway numbers are unsigned. In Putnam County, modern NY 121 was locally maintained until the latter half of the 1920s. NY 121 was designated in the 1930 renumbering of state highways in New York to its current alignment.

== Major intersections ==
County	Location	mi	km	Destinations	Notes
Westchester	Town of Bedford	0.00	0.00	NY 22 – Bedford, Katonah	Southern terminus; hamlet of Bedford
Westchester	Town of Bedford	1.74	2.80	NY 137 east – Pound Ridge	Western terminus of NY 137
Westchester	Town of Lewisboro	4.64	7.47	NY 35 west – Katonah	Southern end of NY 35 concurrency; hamlet of Cross River
Westchester	Town of Lewisboro	5.30	8.53	NY 35 east – South Salem, Ridgefield, CT	Northern end of NY 35 concurrency
Westchester	Town of Lewisboro	7.83	12.60	NY 138 west – Goldens Bridge	Eastern terminus of NY 138; hamlet of Waccabuc
Westchester	Town of North Salem	10.69	17.20	NY 116 west – Purdys	Southern end of NY 116 concurrency
Westchester	Town of North Salem	11.82	19.02	NY 116 east – Ridgefield, CT	Northern end of NY 116 concurrency; hamlet of North Salem
Putnam	Town of Southeast	15.32	24.66	I-84 east – Danbury, CT	Exit 69 on I-84
Putnam	Town of Southeast	15.56	25.04	US 6 / US 202 to I-84 west – Brewster, Newburgh	Northern terminus
1.000 mi = 1.609 km; 1.000 km = 0.621 mi: Concurrency terminus
