= New York State Route 116 =

State highway in Westchester County, New York, US

New York State Route 116
- Map of Putnam and Westchester counties with NY 116 highlighted in red

Route information
- Maintained by NYSDOT
- Length: 8.12 mi (13.07 km)
- Existed: 1930–present

Major junctions
- West end: US 202 in Somers
- I-684 / NY 22 in North Salem
- East end: Route 116 at the Connecticut state line in North Salem

Location
- Country: United States
- State: New York
- Counties: Westchester

Highway system
- New York Highways; Interstate; US; State; Reference; Parkways
← NY 115	→ NY 117

New York State Route 116 (NY 116) is an east–west state highway in Westchester County, New York, in the United States. It extends for 8.12 miles (13.07 km) from an intersection with U.S. Route 202 (US 202) in the town of Somers to the Connecticut state line, where it becomes that state's Route 116. As it heads east, NY 116 connects to Interstate 684 (I-684) and has an overlap with NY 121. NY 116 originally extended as far west as Peekskill when it was assigned as part of the 1930 renumbering of state highways in New York. It was cut back to its current length in the late 1930s.

== Route description ==
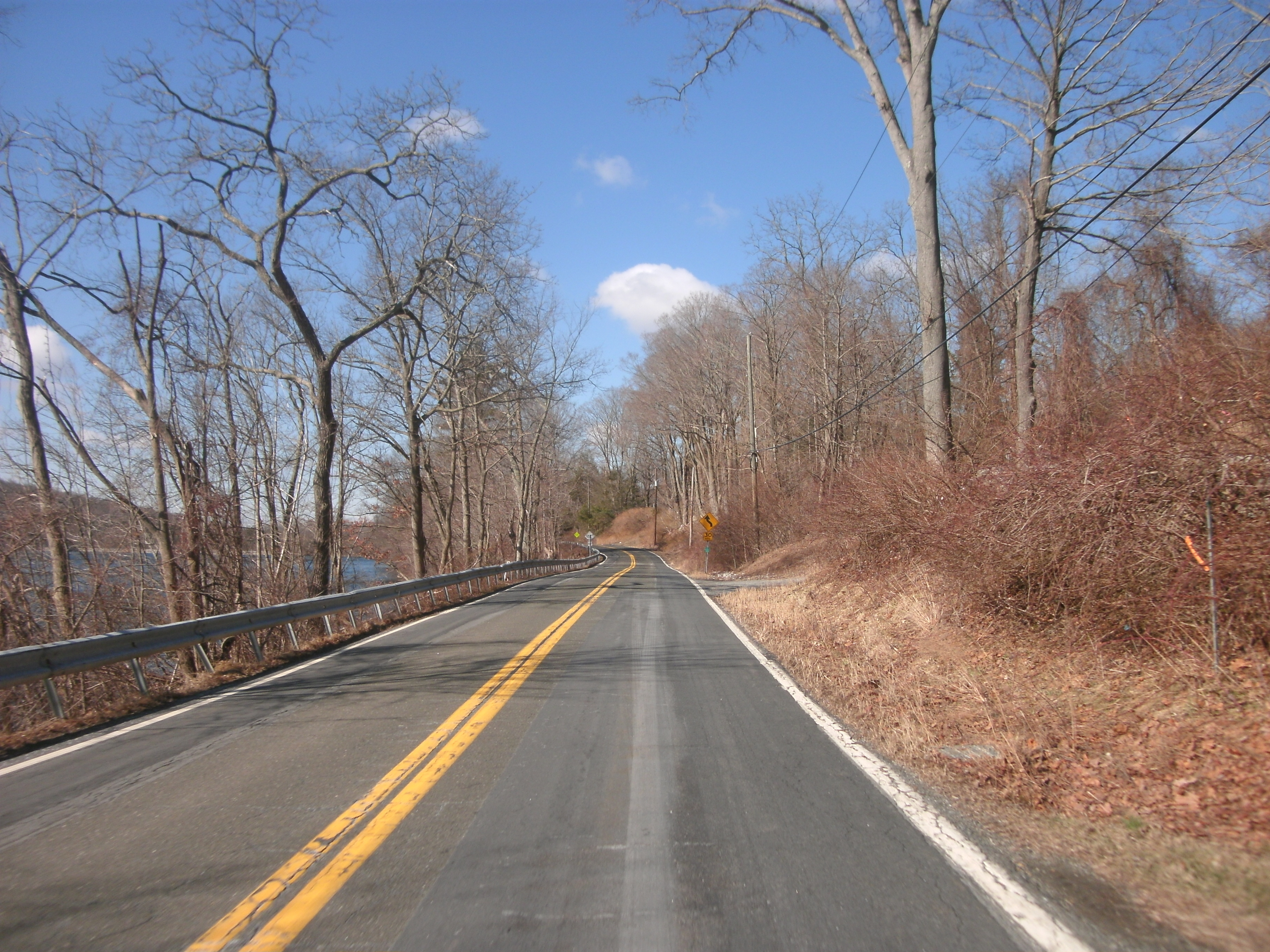
NY 116 westbound through the Titicus Reservoir area in the town of North Salem

NY 116 begins at an intersection with US 202 (North Somerstown Road) in the hamlet of Somers, a couple blocks east of the northern terminus of NY 100. The route proceeds east for one block through a mixed-use area as Somerstown Road, a two-lane street, before bending southeast and changing names to Purdys Road as it leaves the community. Outside of Somers, the businesses give way to residences comprising the hamlet of Lake Purdy, a large residential community off the main roadway. At Lake Purdy, the road turns to take a more easterly track into the town of North Salem, where it crosses the Croton River and passes into the hamlet of Purdys. As NY 116 heads toward the community's center, it crosses over the Metro-North Railroad's Harlem Line and serves the hamlet's Metro-North station.

After crossing over the tracks, NY 116 immediately intersects with I-684 at its exit 7 and meets with NY 22, which closely follows I-684 through northern Westchester County. NY 116 turns north at the latter junction, overlapping with NY 22 for two blocks across the Titicus River before splitting off to the east on Titicus Road. The route loosely parallels the river to the western end of the nearby Titicus Reservoir, located to the south of NY 116. The highway runs east along the northern shore of the reservoir, bowing slightly to the north as it passes several mansions overlooking the water. Past the reservoir, NY 116 enters the hamlet of Salem Center, a community adjacent to the route's junction with June Road (unsigned County Route 310 or CR 310).

Outside of Salem Center, NY 116 heads into less developed, mostly wooded areas of the town of North Salem. Not far from June Road, NY 116 meets and becomes concurrent with NY 121 (Grant Road), which takes on the Titicus Road name. The two routes head to the northeast for about 1 mile (1.6 km), serving a handful of homes on the outskirts of the residential hamlet of North Salem. In North Salem itself, NY 121 turns north to follow Peach Lake Road while NY 116 bends to follow a more southeasterly track. NY 116 quickly leaves the hamlet, passing through wooded, sparsely populated sections of the town to reach the Connecticut state line. The highway passes a large farm as it crosses the state line and continues into the town of Ridgefield as that state's Route 116.

== History ==
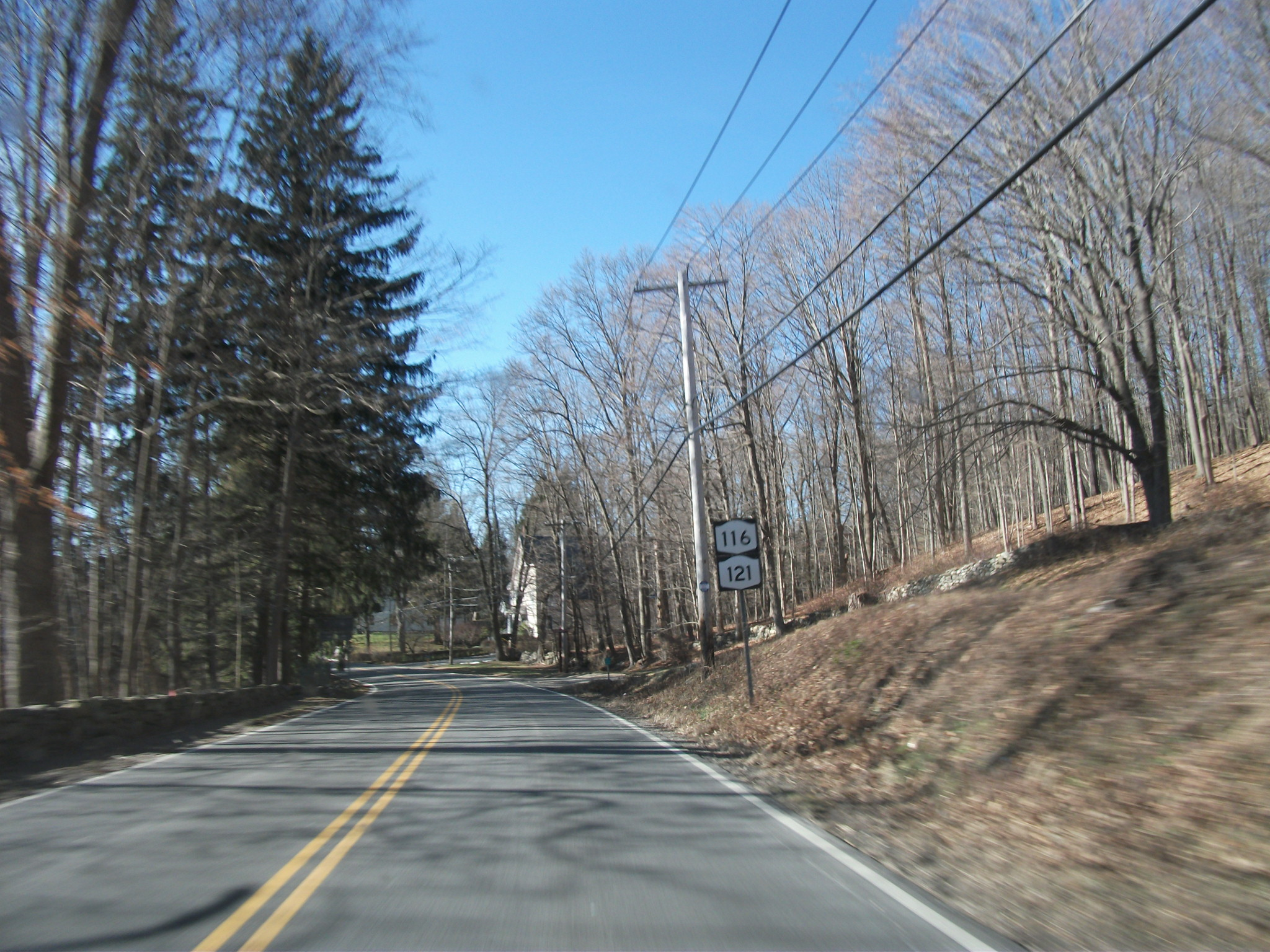
NY 121 and NY 116 through North Salem

NY 116 was originally a much longer route when it was assigned as part of the 1930 renumbering of state highways in New York. At the time, it began in Peekskill and followed modern US 202 east to Somers, from where it continued east over its current alignment to the Connecticut state line. In 1934, US 202 was designated and overlapped with NY 116 from Peekskill to Somers. The overlap was eliminated c. 1938 when NY 116 was truncated to its current western terminus in Somers.

== Major intersections ==
The entire route is in Westchester County.

Location	mi	km	Destinations	Notes
Somers	0.00	0.00	US 202	Western terminus
North Salem	1.32	2.12	I-684 south – White Plains	Exit 7 on I-684
North Salem	1.41	2.27	NY 22 south	Western end of NY 22 concurrency; hamlet of Purdys
North Salem	1.48	2.38	NY 22 north to I-684 north – Croton Falls	Eastern end of NY 22 concurrency
North Salem	5.36	8.63	June Road – Cross River	Former NY 124
North Salem	5.90	9.50	NY 121 south (Grant Road) – Cross River	Western end of NY 121 concurrency
North Salem	7.03	11.31	NY 121 north (Peach Lake Road)	Eastern end of NY 121 concurrency; hamlet of North Salem
North Salem	8.12	13.07	Route 116 south – Ridgefield	Continuation into Connecticut
1.000 mi = 1.609 km; 1.000 km = 0.621 mi: Concurrency terminus
