= New York State Route 138 =

State highway in Westchester County, New York, US

New York State Route 138
- Map of Westchester County in southeastern New York with NY 138 highlighted in red

Route information
- Maintained by NYSDOT
- Length: 5.19 mi (8.35 km)
- Existed: 1930–present

Major junctions
- West end: NY 100 in Somers
- I-684 in Goldens Bridge
- East end: NY 121 in Waccabuc

Location
- Country: United States
- State: New York
- Counties: Westchester

Highway system
- New York Highways; Interstate; US; State; Reference; Parkways
← NY 137	→ NY 139

New York State Route 138 (NY 138) is a 5.19-mile (8.35 km) long state highway in Westchester County, New York. It begins in the town of Somers at NY 100 and ends at NY 121 west of the hamlet of Waccabuc. The road passes by the shopping center in Goldens Bridge.

== Route description ==
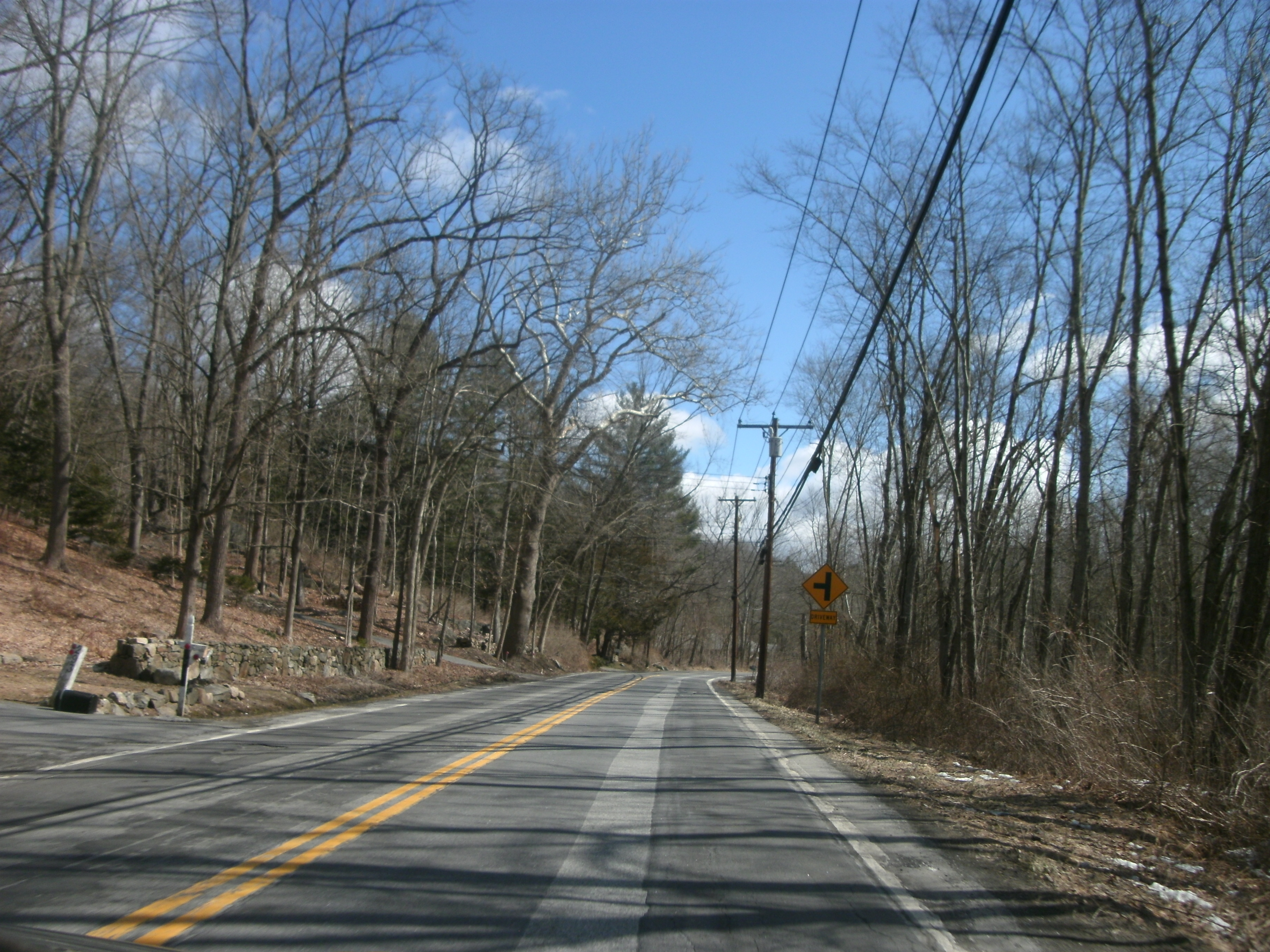
NY 138 east of Goldens Bridge, in the town of Lewisboro

NY 138 begins at an intersection with NY 100 in the town of Somers. It proceeds southeast away from NY 100 through dense woods, bending farther southeast and crossing over the Muscoot Reservoir near Bridge L-158 into the town of Lewisboro. It shortly enters the hamlet of Goldens Bridge, where it crosses north of the parking lot for the Metro-North station. After passing the station entranceway, the route crosses over I-684, which is only accessible southbound. Immediately after, NY 138 crosses NY 22.

Past NY 22, NY 138 continues east through Lewisboro. Passing north of Lake Katonah, the route reaches a junction with Increase Miller Road, where it turns northeast past Fox Valley Park. Afterwards, the route reaches a junction with NY 121; its right-of-way continues east as Chapel Road.

== History ==
The roadways that make up NY 138 were first upgraded to state highway standards between 1910 and 1912. The portion of NY 138 from NY 100 to a creek west of the Goldens Bridge station along with NY 100 from NY 138 to US 202 in Croton Falls was designated as unsigned State Highway 775 (SH 775). The alignment of SH 775 was first given a contract on February 19, 1910, to construct the 4.42 mi (7.11 km) segment of highway at the cost of $48,714.64 (1910 USD). This section was completed on January 4, 1911. The other major portion of NY 138, SH 770, covered a small section east of SH 775 and all of the modern designation out to NY 121. The contract for SH 770 was let May 13, 1910, and completed on January 23, 1912, at the cost of $54,794.77 (1912 USD), half of which was paid by the state.

The designation NY 138 was established in the 1930 state highway renumbering, and has not had any major changes to its route or size since.

== Major intersections ==
The entire route is in Westchester County.

Location	mi	km	Destinations	Notes
Somers	0.00	0.00	NY 100 – Millwood, Brewster	Western terminus
Lewisboro	1.70	2.74	I-684 south – White Plains	Former I-87
Lewisboro	1.85	2.98	To NY 22	Access via North Street; hamlet of Goldens Bridge
Lewisboro	5.19	8.35	NY 121 – North Salem, Cross River	Eastern terminus; hamlet of Waccabuc
1.000 mi = 1.609 km; 1.000 km = 0.621 mi
