= Bridge L-158 =

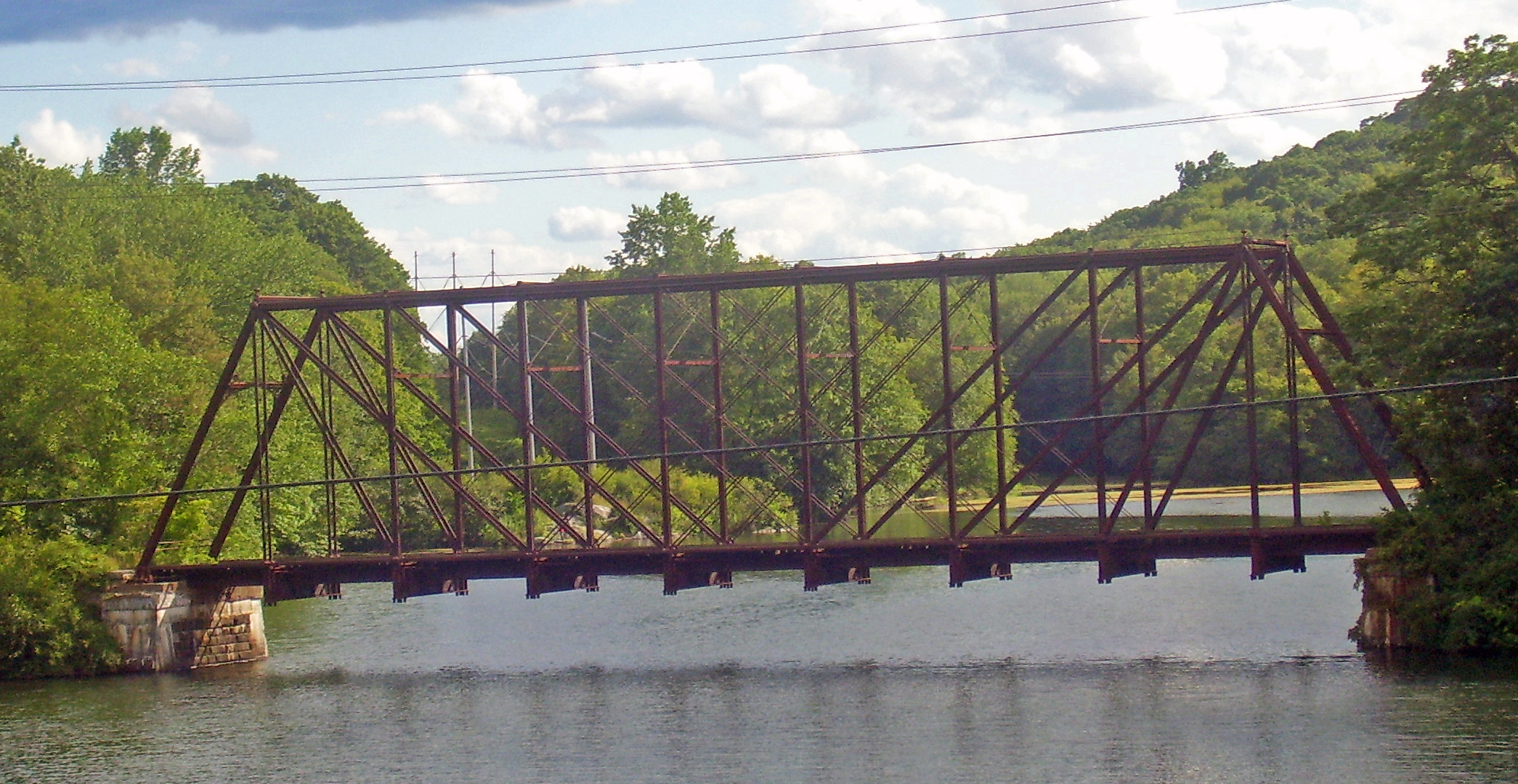
- View of Bridge L-158 from NY 138 to the north
- Coordinates: 41°17′47″N 73°40′58″W
- Carries: Abandoned NYCRR right-of-way
- Crosses: Muscoot Reservoir
- Locale: Goldens Bridge, New York, USA
- Maintained by: New York City Department of Environmental Protection

Characteristics
- Design: Double-intersection Whipple truss
- Material: Wrought iron
- Total length: 163 feet (50 m)
- Width: 16 feet (4.9 m)
- Clearance below: 12 feet (3.7 m)

History
- Constructed by: Clarke, Reeves & Co.; North River Construction Co.
- Construction end: 1883
- Opened: 1883 moved to current location in 1904
- Bridge L-158
- U.S. National Register of Historic Places
- New York State Register of Historic Places
- Area: 1 acre (0.4 ha)
- NRHP reference No.: 78001923
- NYSRHP No.: 11906.000013

Significant dates
- Added to NRHP: November 29, 1978
- Designated NYSRHP: June 23, 1980

Location
- Interactive map of Bridge L-158

Bridge L-158 is a disused railroad bridge over the Muscoot Reservoir near Goldens Bridge in Westchester County, New York, United States. Built in 1883 to carry New York Central Railroad traffic over Rondout Creek near Kingston in Ulster County further upstate, it was moved to its current location in 1904.

In 1960, it was taken out of service after the line it had served in its new role had been closed, and the tracks removed. It is the only remaining double-intersection Whipple truss railroad bridge in New York. In 1978, it was listed on the National Register of Historic Places, the only bridge entirely within Westchester County to be listed in its own right.

== Location ==
The bridge is located at a narrows in the Muscoot Reservoir reservoir, which impounds the flow of the Croton River before releasing it downstream, approximately one half-mile (1 km) west of the Goldens Bridge station on the Metro-North Harlem Line and Interstate 684. It straddles the line between the town of Lewisboro on the east and Somers on the west.

NY 138 crosses the reservoir 500 feet (150 m) to the north. L-158 is most clearly seen from there.

The bridge is surrounded by protected woodlands, part of the Croton Watershed established in the 1800s to serve the New York City water supply system, all owned today by the New York City Department of Environmental Protection. The former route of the tracks remains visible on both approaches to the bridge.

== Structure ==
The bridge's two trusses are identical, consisting of nine panels apiece totaling 163 feet (50 m) long. The web is 32 feet (9.8 m) tall, and the bridge as rebuilt to a single track 16 feet (4.9 m) wide. Two concrete abutments support the single-track bridge 12 feet (3.7 m) above mean water level.

Its pin-connected superstructure uses wrought iron Phoenix columns in its top chord and compression members. The end posts and upper chord are made up of six flanged cast iron elements riveted together. The intermediate verticals and lateral struts have four apiece.

The diagonals and lower chord have rectangular eyebars 4 to 6 inches (10 to 15 cm) wide. Round bars are used for the counters and sway braces. The wooden ties laid on iron stringers riveted to transverse iron floor beams. Both portals are decorated with quatrefoil brackets and finials.

== History ==
The bridge was originally the smallest of three spans in a 1,200-foot (370 m) combination viaduct-bridge along the former New York Central West Shore Line at the mouth of Rondout Creek in Kingston, over 75 miles (121 km) to the north. It was built in 1883 by Clarke, Reeves & Company, a Philadelphia-based subsidiary of the Phoenix Iron Works as a 29-foot-wide (8.8 m) double-tracked structure, known administratively within the Central as Bridge 141.

In 1904, the railroad built another bridge at the Rondout that could carry the entire load on one span. At the same time, New York City was beginning to buy, clear and flood land for its water supply system in the Croton River watershed. Railroads in the area were required, under their agreements with the city, to install bridges over any inundated areas at their own expense.

The railroad decided to move Bridge 141 south to the new reservoir where it would easily span the gap needed for the Mahopac Branch from the former New York and Harlem Railroad main line. The branch, formerly the New York & Mahopac Railroad, served what had been a summer resort community there in the 19th century. Since it was a single-track line, the bridge, after the move renamed Bridge L-158, was rebuilt to 16 feet (4.9 m) wide.

Service on the Mahopac Branch continued until 1960. The tracks were eventually dismantled to and from the bridge, but the bridge itself remained. In 1976, a survey team from the Historic American Engineering Record found that it remained in good condition despite the lack of maintenance or use. Its presence on New York City watershed land, where development is prohibited and public access tightly restricted, has helped in its historic preservation.

== See also ==
- List of bridges documented by the Historic American Engineering Record in New York (state)
- List of bridges on the National Register of Historic Places in New York
- National Register of Historic Places listings in northern Westchester County, New York
