= Titicus River =

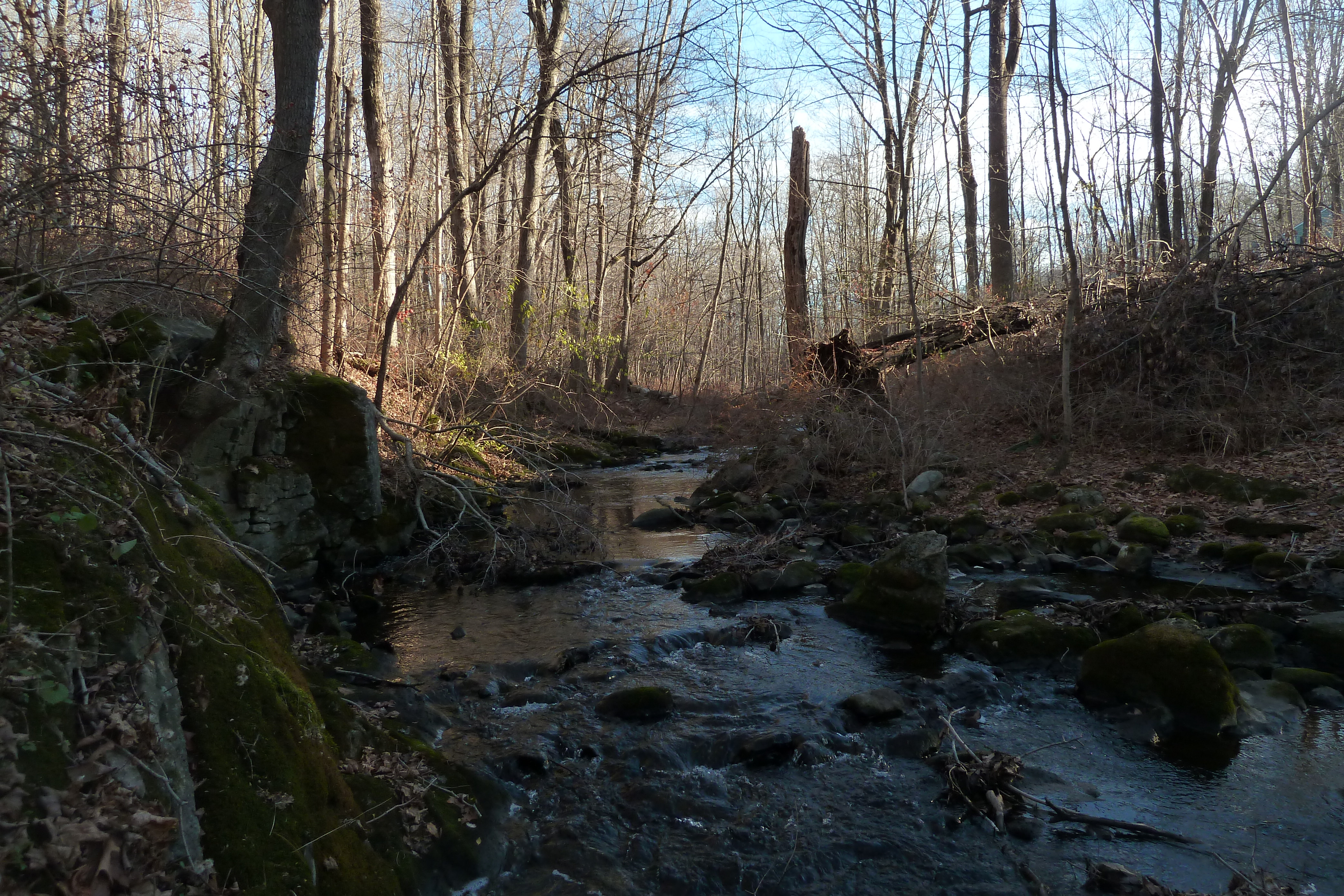
- The Titicus River in Ridgefield, CT

Location
- Country: United States
- State: New York, Connecticut
- Cities: Ridgefield, North Salem

Physical characteristics
- Source
  - location: Ridgefield, Fairfield County, Connecticut
- Mouth: Muscoot Reservoir
  - location: North Salem, Westchester County, New York
  - coordinates: 41.3273°N 73.6594°W
- Basin size: 23.8 mi^{2} (62 km^{2})
- Discharge
  - average: 43 cu ft/s (1.2 m^{3}/s)
  - minimum: 1.3 cu ft/s (0.037 m^{3}/s)
  - maximum: 2,190 cu ft/s (62 m^{3}/s)

The Titicus River is an 8.5-mile-long (13.7 km) river in southwestern Connecticut and southeastern New York that drains into the Titicus Reservoir, part of New York City's water supply system. Part of both the Croton River watershed and the system's Croton Watershed, the river has a 23.8 square miles (62 km^{2}) drainage area. It is one of the few rivers with headwaters in Connecticut that is part of the system. The source of the river is in Ridgefield, Connecticut. About one mile down stream, the stream marks the southern boundary of the Kiahs Brook Reserve. Another 0.5 miles downriver, it joins with Kiahs Brook, and then runs fairly close to Route 116. Once past the New York border, the Titicus River still runs close to New York 116 until emptying into the Titicus Reservoir. After the Titicus Reservoir, it runs another 0.5 miles, under I-684, and drains into the Muscoot Reservoir.

== See also ==
- List of rivers of Connecticut
- List of rivers of New York
