= Katonah–Lewisboro School District =

School district in New York, United States

Address
- 1 Shady Lane South Salem, New York, 10590; United States
- Coordinates: 41.2706°N 73.6106°W

District information
- Type: Public
- Grades: K–12
- NCES District ID: 3616080

Students and staff
- Students: 2,913
- Teachers: 253.4
- Staff: 260.03
- Student–teacher ratio: 11.5

Other information
- Website: www.klschools.org

The Katonah–Lewisboro Union Free School District, or simply the Katonah–Lewisboro School District (KLSD) is a school district headquartered in South Salem, New York. The district has a Katonah, New York mailing address.

== History ==
Paul Kreutzer was previously superintendent until he resigned unexpectedly in 2014.

In 2024, Raymond Blanch was appointed as superintendent.

== Headquarters ==
The headquarters is located in the 1 Shady Lane building in South Salem. In August 2011 the headquarters moved from 1 Shady Lane to Increase Miller Elementary School in Goldens Bridge. In 2014 the district redistricted its elementary schools so it moved the headquarters back to South Salem. On March 26 of that year the district relocated the Human Resources Department. On March 31 the district moved its Business Office. On April 7 it moved its Superintendents Office.

== Schools ==
- John Jay High School (Cross River)
- John Jay Middle School (Cross River)

Elementary schools:

- Increase Miller Elementary School (Goldens Bridge)
- Katonah Elementary School (Katonah)
- Meadow Pond Elementary School (South Salem)

=== Closed schools ===
- Lewisboro Elementary School (South Salem, closed 2014)
