= New York State Route 104 (disambiguation) =

New York State Route 104 is an east–west state highway in western and central New York, United States, that was established in the early 1970s.

New York State Route 104 may also refer to:

- New York State Route 104 (early 1930s) in Queens and Nassau counties
- New York State Route 104 (1932–1936) in Westchester County
