= Connecticut Route 104 =

State highway in Fairfield County, Connecticut, US

Route 104
- Map of Fairfield County in southwestern Connecticut with Route 104 highlighted in red

Route information
- Maintained by CTDOT
- Length: 6.82 mi (10.98 km)
- Existed: 1935–present

Major junctions
- South end: Route 137 in Stamford
- Route 15 / Merritt Parkway in Stamford
- North end: Long Ridge Road at the New York state line in Long Ridge

Location
- Country: United States
- State: Connecticut
- Counties: Fairfield

Highway system
- Connecticut State Highway System; Interstate; US; State; SSR; SR; Scenic
← Route 103	→ Route 106

Route 104 is a Connecticut state highway in the city of Stamford, starting from the Bulls Head section of the city then through North Stamford, with the highway ending at New York state line.

== Route description ==
Route 104 begins at an intersection with Route 137 in the Bulls Head section of Stamford and heads north, passing by GE Capital, then crossing the Rippowam River, up through North Stamford and onto New York state line. About 2.3 miles (3.7 km) north of the river, Route 104 crosses underneath Route 15 (Merritt Parkway) into the North Stamford section of the city. After another 3.2 miles (5.1 km), Route 104 crosses over the Mianus River, through the Long Ridge section of the city, as it heads towards the New York state line. The route ends in the town of Pound Ridge, New York and continues as Long Ridge Road. Route 104 is known as Long Ridge Road throughout its entire length and is classified as a principal arterial road, carrying traffic volumes of as much as 30,000 vehicles per day, particularly near the Merritt Parkway interchange. Route 104 is four lanes wide from Route 137 to Route 15, and two lanes wide north of Route 15.

== History ==
In the 1920s, the route from downtown Stamford to the Long Ridge section of the city was a secondary state highway known as Highway 300. It ran from U.S. Route 1 along Bedford Street and Long Ridge Road up to the New York state line. Highway 300 was renumbered as Route 104 in the 1932 state highway renumbering. In 1976, Route 137 was extended south along Washington Boulevard (parallel to Bedford Street) to US 1 and Route 104 was truncated to its current south end at Route 137.

== Junction list ==
The entire route is in Stamford, Fairfield County.

mi	km	Destinations	Notes
0.00	0.00	Route 137 (Cold Spring Road) – Railroad Station	Southern terminus
2.27	3.65	Route 15 / Merritt Parkway – New Haven, New York City	Exit 9 on Merritt Parkway
6.82	10.98	Long Ridge Road – Bedford, Pound Ridge	Continuation into New York
1.000 mi = 1.609 km; 1.000 km = 0.621 mi
