= Connecticut Route 137 =

State highway in Fairfield County, Connecticut, US

Route 137
- Map of Fairfield County in southwestern Connecticut with Route 137 highlighted in red

Route information
- Maintained by CTDOT
- Length: 9.33 mi (15.02 km)
- Existed: 1932–present

Major junctions
- South end: US 1 in Stamford
- Route 15 / Merritt Parkway in Stamford
- North end: NY 137 at the New York state line near Pound Ridge, NY

Location
- Country: United States
- State: Connecticut
- Counties: Fairfield

Highway system
- Connecticut State Highway System; Interstate; US; State; SSR; SR; Scenic
← Route 136	→ Route 138

Route 137 is a main highway running north–south through the city of Stamford, Connecticut. It runs for about 9.3 miles (15.0 km) from Downtown Stamford up to North Stamford and then to New York state line in the town of Pound Ridge, New York.

== Route description ==
Route 137 begins as a four-lane/six-lane divided arterial road from U.S. Route 1 (US 1) in Downtown Stamford, heading north to an interchange with Route 15 (Merritt Parkway). The route then continues as a two-lane road all the way to the New York state line in the town of Pound Ridge, New York. Past its southern end at US 1, the roadway continues for another 0.3 miles (0.48 km) to Interstate 95 (I-95), designated as Special Service Road 493 (SSR 493).

The section of Route 137 from High Ridge Road to the state line is designated the Yankee Division Highway.

The ramp from Route 137 north to the Parkway southbound has one of the few jughandle ramps in Connecticut.

== History ==
A previous road called State Highway 137 was created in the 1920s, which followed contemporary Route 101 between Route 169 and Route 12. This route, in eastern Connecticut, shared no overlap with contemporary Route 137.

In late 1931, a route roughly corresponding to contemporary Route 137 was proposed as Route 27. However, the route's numbering was re-designated to correspond to match New York State Route 137 across the state border.

The current Route 137 was first commissioned in 1932. In its original form, the southern portion of the route ran alongside Summer Street instead of Washington Boulevard. In the 1920s, this route had been known as State Highway 318. The original path of Route 137 consisted only of High Ridge Road. Its southern terminus was located at the intersection of Long Ridge Road (Route 104), Summer and Bedford Streets, also known as "Bull's Head", in Stamford.

In 1956, the Westchester Planning Department proposed a "Stamford–Bedford Village Road" between Route 104 and Route 137. This was never built.

In 1959, Connecticut's government spent $2.2 million on widening High Ridge Road, a segment of Route 137, from two lanes to four lanes.

In 1962, the Tri-State Transportation Committee proposed expanding Route 137 to be four lanes divided with a median and no access control, from I-95 to the Merritt Parkway. This was never implemented.

In 1969, the government of Westchester County proposed expanding Route 137 to be a freeway from New York State Route 172 south. The planned called for the creation of interchanges at the Merritt Parkway, Route 104, US 1, and I-95. The road also might have continued south to a proposed bridge to Long Island. This plan was never implemented.

In 1976, the southern portion of Route 137, south of Bull's Head, was changed. The route previously ran along Summer Street, but was re-designated to run along Cold Spring Road and Washington Boulevard. Route 104, which originally extended south into downtown Stamford using Bedford and Summer Street, was cut back to end at its current southern terminus at the same time.

In November 2023, following numerous major crashes along the southern portion of Washington Boulevard, the Connecticut State Department of Transportation floated redesigning part of the route to include cycling infrastructure and additional traffic calming devices.

=== Safety issues ===
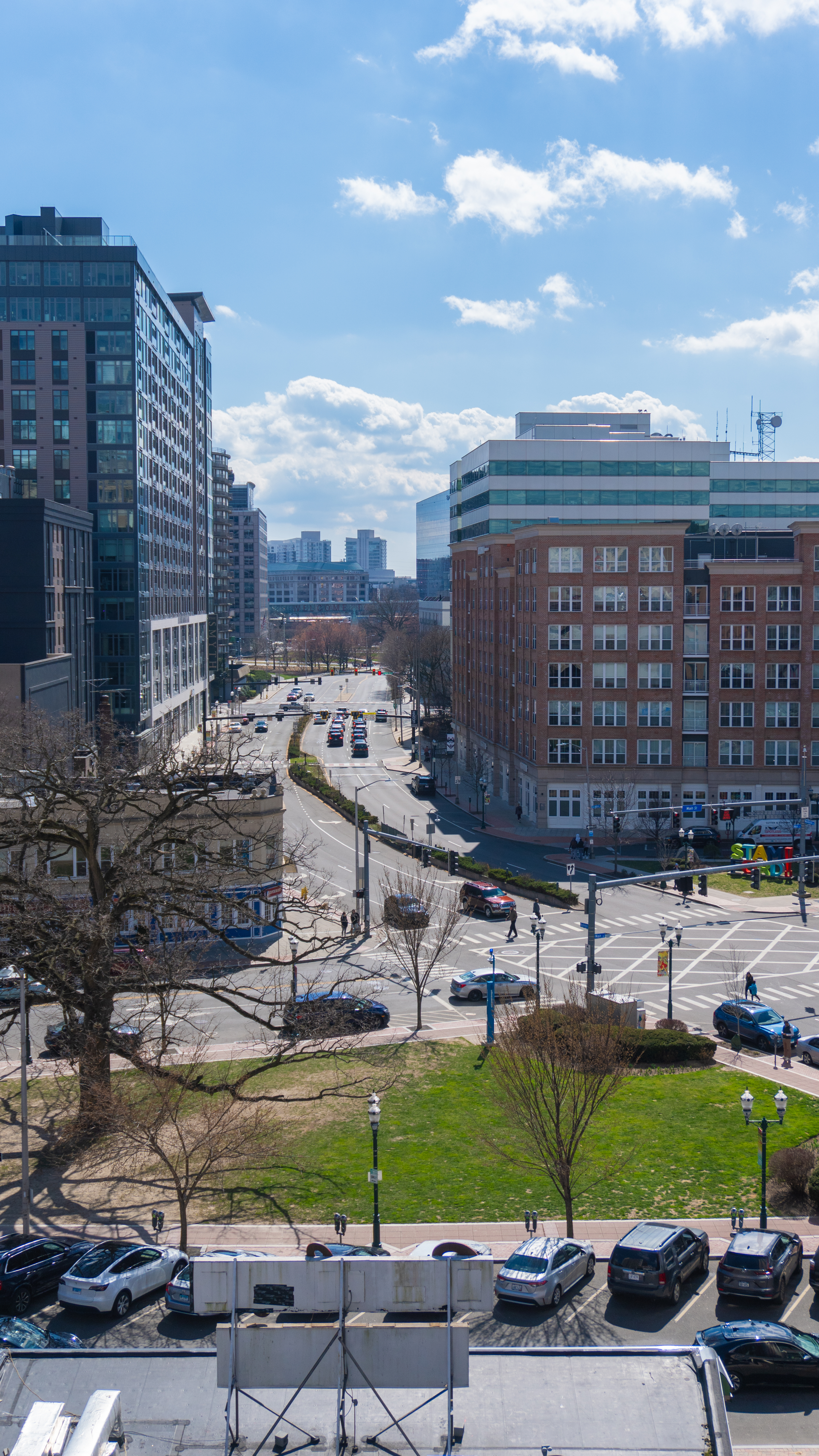
A view of Downtown Stamford, with a portion of Route 137 signed as Washington Boulevard running through it

From 2018 to 2023, the southern portion of Route 137, running along Washington Boulevard, has had more fatal crashes than any other local street in Stamford. Stamford locals have historically called the road the "boulevard of death". A road safety audit released by the Connecticut Department of Transportation in November 2023 found that a section of Washington Boulevard running through Downtown Stamford was the site of 547 crashes from January 2017 to December 2021. During this time period, 100 crashes occurred at the intersection of Washington Boulevard and Broad Street alone.

To address these issues, the Connecticut Department of Transportation has proposed a number of changes to a segment of Washington Boulevard. Proposed changes include lowering the speed limit along the road, evaluating whether to remove turning lanes, installing bump-outs, building raised intersections, evaluating whether to widen the Boulevard's median, and evaluating whether to install a separated bike path along a segment of the Boulevard.

== Junction list ==
The entire route is in Stamford, Fairfield County.

mi	km	Destinations	Notes
0.00	0.00	US 1 (Tresser Boulevard) to I-95 – New York City, New Haven	Southern terminus; access to I-95 via SSR 493
1.76	2.83	Route 104 north (Long Ridge Road)	Southern terminus of Route 104
4.56	7.34	Route 15 / Merritt Parkway – New Haven, New York City	Exit 10 on Merritt Parkway
9.33	15.02	NY 137 north	Continuation into New York
1.000 mi = 1.609 km; 1.000 km = 0.621 mi
