= New York State Route 124 =

State highway in Westchester County, New York, US

New York State Route 124
- Map of Westchester County in southeastern New York with NY 124 highlighted in red, NY 983D in blue

Route information
- Maintained by NYSDOT
- Length: 4.96 mi (7.98 km)
- Existed: 1930–present

Major junctions
- South end: NY 137 in Pound Ridge
- North end: NY 35 in Lewisboro

Location
- Country: United States
- State: New York
- Counties: Westchester

Highway system
- New York Highways; Interstate; US; State; Reference; Parkways
← NY 123	→ NY 125

New York State Route 124 (NY 124) is a 4.96-mile (7.98 km) long north–south state highway in the northern part of Westchester County, New York, in the United States. NY 124 begins at NY 137 in the hamlet of Pound Ridge (in the town of the same name). It heads north and crosses into the town of Lewisboro, ending west of the hamlet of South Salem at NY 35. Just before the junction with NY 35, NY 124 splits into a west leg and an east leg, with both legs ending at NY 35. Both legs are signed as NY 124 but the main line officially runs on the west leg. The east leg is internally designated as NY 983D, an unsigned reference route. Both legs are approximately 0.35 miles (0.56 km) in length.

== Route description ==
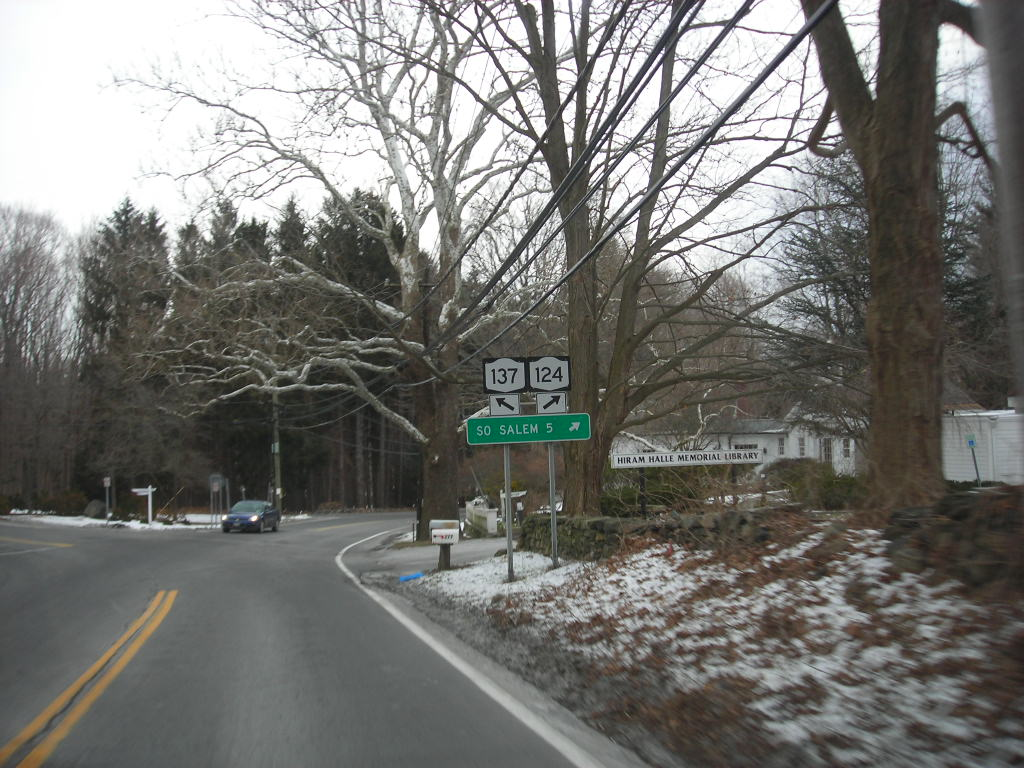
NY 137 northbound at the junction with NY 124 in Pound Ridge

NY 124 begins at a junction with NY 137 (Stone Hill Road / Westchester Avenue) in the town and hamlet of Pound Ridge. NY 124 proceeds eastward along Salem Road through Pound Ridge as a two-lane wooded residential street. The route bends northward through Pound Ridge, following the same backdrop west of Trinity Lake past some power lines and into a junction with Donbrook Road. The route bends northeast, passing a pond and a commercial business next to some residences before intersecting with Kitchawan Road, which connects NY 124 to NY 123 in the nearby town of Lewisboro. After Kitchawan Road, NY 124 bends northwest along a long stretch of residences, passing west of Lake Kitchawan after straightening to the north.

Continuing north through Pound Ridge, NY 124 remains the two-lane Salem Road, passing multiple residences on each side. The route bends northwest again, entering the hamlet of Boutonville. Boutonville consists of two intersections and few houses as NY 124 crosses through the center and is now in the town of Lewisboro. North of Boutonville, NY 124 retains its Salem Road moniker through Lewisboro, intersecting with NY 983D (signed as a spur of NY 124), which connects to NY 35. Meanwhile, NY 124 bends to the northwest, along Spring Street South, crossing one business before intersecting with NY 35 (Cross River Road) in Lewisboro. This junction serves as the northern terminus of NY 124.

== History ==
NY 124 was assigned as part of the 1930 renumbering of state highways in New York. It began at NY 137 in Pound Ridge and continued north into Lewisboro, where it met NY 123 (now NY 35). NY 124 then overlapped NY 123 west to the hamlet of Cross River, where it joined NY 121 north to the North Salem hamlet of Grant Corner. The route left NY 121 here and followed June, North Salem, and Deans Corner Roads north to a terminus at NY 22 south of Brewster. NY 124 was extended south to the Connecticut state line in 1966 by way of Westchester Avenue—replacing NY 394—and an overlap with NY 137. It continued into Connecticut as Route 124.

The route was truncated on both ends over the next two decades. The extension to Connecticut was eliminated by 1970, returning NY 124's southern terminus to NY 137 in Pound Ridge. NY 124 was truncated again in 1980 as a result of two highway maintenance swaps between the state of New York and Putnam and Westchester counties. Ownership and maintenance of all of NY 124 within Putnam County was transferred to the county on April 1, while the section of NY 124 between NY 121 and the Putnam County line was given to Westchester County on September 1. NY 124 was subsequently truncated southward to the eastern terminus of its overlap with NY 35 while the former routing of NY 124 north of NY 121 became County Route 310 in Westchester County and County Route 55 in Putnam County.

== Major intersections ==
The entire route is in Westchester County.

Location	mi	km	Destinations	Notes
Pound Ridge	0.00	0.00	NY 137 – Stamford, CT	Southern terminus
Lewisboro	4.62	7.44	To NY 35 east – Ridgefield, CT	Access via NY 983D
Lewisboro	4.96	7.98	NY 35 – Cross River, Ridgefield, CT	Northern terminus
1.000 mi = 1.609 km; 1.000 km = 0.621 mi

== See also ==
- List of county routes in Putnam County, New York
- List of county routes in Westchester County, New York
