= New York State Route 137 =

State highway in Westchester County, New York, US

New York State Route 137
- Map of Westchester County in southeastern New York with NY 137 highlighted in red

Route information
- Maintained by NYSDOT
- Length: 5.51 mi (8.87 km)
- Existed: 1930–present

Major junctions
- South end: Route 137 at the Connecticut state line near Pound Ridge
- North end: NY 121 in Bedford

Location
- Country: United States
- State: New York
- Counties: Westchester

Highway system
- New York Highways; Interstate; US; State; Reference; Parkways
← NY 136	→ NY 138

New York State Route 137 (NY 137) is a 5.51-mile (8.87 km) long state highway in Westchester County, New York, in the United States. The route is a continuation of Connecticut's Route 137, which links NY 137 to Stamford, Connecticut. NY 137 goes through the hamlet of Pound Ridge and ends at NY 121 north of the hamlet of Bedford, locally known as Bedford Village.

== Route description ==
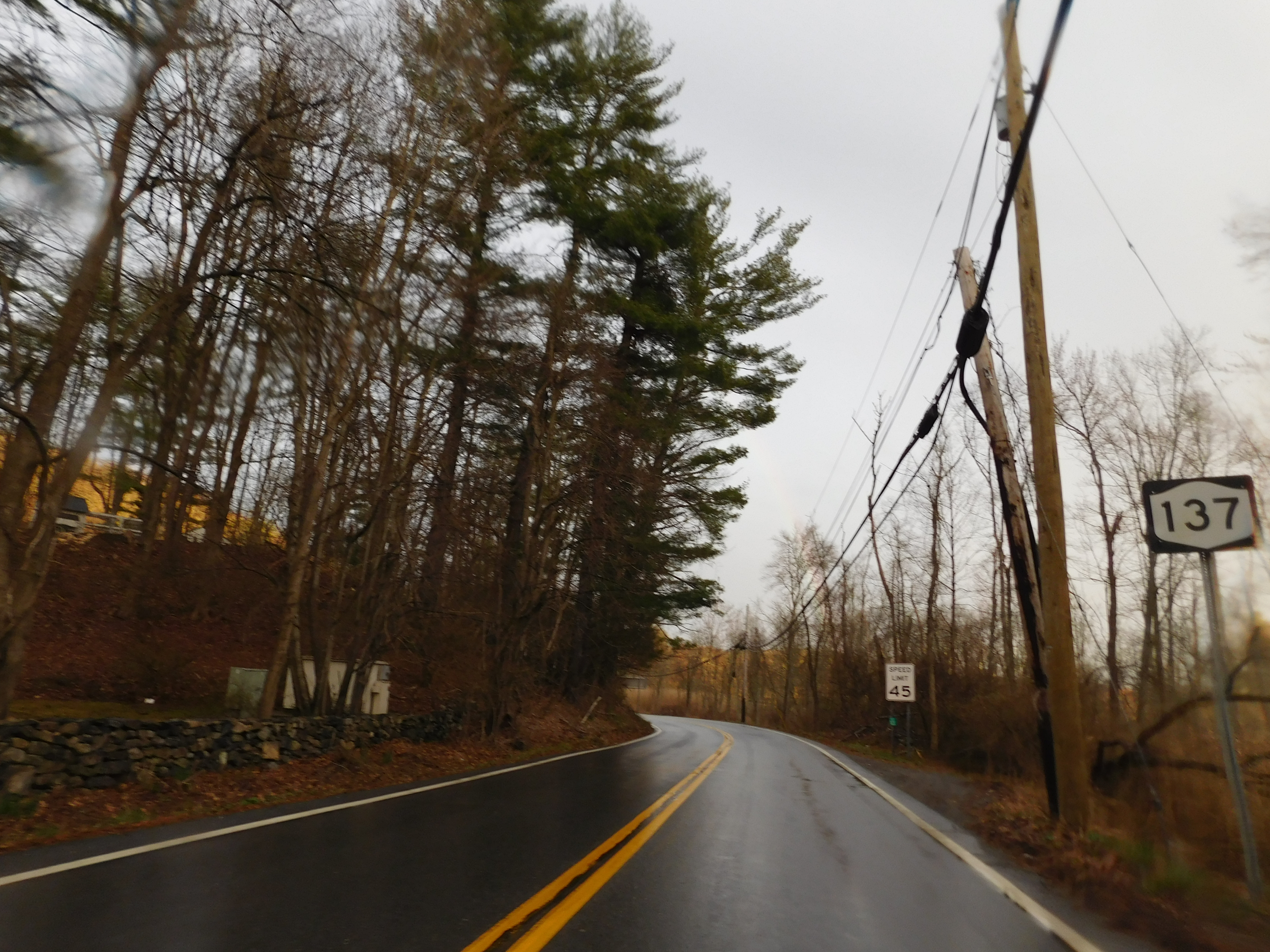
NY 137 east from NY 121 in Bedford

NY 137 begins at the New York–Connecticut state line in the town of Pound Ridge as a northern continuation of CT 137 (High Ridge Road). Immediately after crossing the state line, NY 137 passes east of the Pound Ridge Golf Club, which runs along the state line. NY 137 proceeds north through Pound Ridge as High Ridge Road, intersecting with Old Snake Hill Road, which runs along Snake Hill and re-intersects a short distance later. After descending from Snake Hill, NY 137 enters the hamlet of Sarles Corners, where it intersects with Upper Shad Road. After leaving Sarles Corners, NY 137 bends northward, becoming a two-lane residential street through Pound Ridge, running along the side of Horseshoe Hill, where it intersects with Westchester Avenue. At this junction, NY 137 drops the High Ridge Road moniker, and gains the Westchester Avenue moniker.

After the junction, NY 137 continues northward through the town of Pound Ridge, soon entering the hamlet with the same name. The hamlet consists of several residences, commercial businesses and most importantly, a junction with the eastern terminus of NY 172 (Pound Ridge Road). After bending northeast out of downtown, NY 137 passes the Hiram Halle Memorial Library and into a junction with NY 124 (Salem Road). At this junction, NY 137 bends north, intersects with a connector road to NY 124 then turns northwest on Stone Hill Road. Stone Hill Road is a two-lane wooded street, and NY 137 proceeds northwest through the town of Pound Ridge past a pond. A short distance later, residences appear along the highway as it climbs westward along Stone Hill.

After descending from Stone Hill, NY 137 bends southwest passing several ponds and the Stone Hill River as it works its way west once again. Passing several residences, NY 137 begins winding west into the town of Beford. Through Bedford, NY 137 retains the Stone Hill Road moniker, crosses over Stone Hill River as it descends towards the hamlet of Bedford, where it intersects with NY 121 (Old Post Road). This intersection serves as the northern terminus of NY 137.

== History ==
The roadway that make up NY 137 from NY 121 in the town of Bedford to Westchester Avenue in the area of Horseshoe Hill along with the alignment of former NY 137A was upgraded to state standards in the early 1900s. The segment, designated as unsigned State Highway 1306 (SH 1306), 5.72 miles (9.21 km), was given a contract on August 31, 1915. The highway took over six years to complete, with construction being completed on November 23, 1921, at the cost of $111,453.53 (1921 USD) with $72,446.09 paid by the state of New York.

NY 137 was first designated in the 1930 renumbering of state highways in New York as a continuation of the road leading north from Stamford, Connecticut. The original route ran from NY 22 north of the hamlet of Bedford to the Connecticut line by way of Girdle Ridge and Pea Pond roads and a short overlap with NY 121. On September 1, 1980, ownership and maintenance of Girdle Ridge and Pea Pond roads was transferred from the state of New York to Westchester County as part of a highway maintenance swap between the two levels of government. NY 137 was truncated to the southern terminus of its overlap with NY 121 as a result. The former routing of NY 137 along Girdle Ridge and Pea Pond roads was redesignated as County Route 309. An expressway was planned along the NY–CT Route 137 corridor in the 1950s.

== NY 137A ==
New York State Route 137A
- Location: Pound Ridge–Connecticut state line
- Existed: 1930–c. 1932

NY 137A was a spur route in the town of Pound Ridge that connected NY 137 to the Connecticut state line, where it connected to State Highway 184 (later Route 124), by way of Westchester Avenue. It was assigned as part of the 1930 renumbering of state highways in New York. NY 137A was renumbered to NY 104 c. 1932, which in turn was renumbered to NY 394 c. 1935 to eliminate numerical duplication with U.S. Route 104 in Upstate New York. In 1967, NY 394 became an extension of NY 124. The extension was short-lived as NY 124 was truncated back to the hamlet of Pound Ridge by 1970. Westchester Avenue is now maintained by the town of Pound Ridge.

== Major intersections ==
The entire route is in Westchester County.

Location	mi	km	Destinations	Notes
Pound Ridge	0.00	0.00	Route 137 south – High Ridge	Continuation into Connecticut
Pound Ridge	1.74	2.80	To Route 124 south – Scotts Corners	Access via Westchester Avenue
Pound Ridge	2.47	3.98	NY 172 west – Bedford	Eastern terminus of NY 172; hamlet of Pound Ridge
Pound Ridge	2.64	4.25	NY 124 north – South Salem	Southern terminus of NY 124; hamlet of Pound Ridge
Town of Bedford	5.51	8.87	NY 121 – Bedford, Cross River	Northern terminus
1.000 mi = 1.609 km; 1.000 km = 0.621 mi

== See also ==
- List of county routes in Westchester County, New York
