= 1930 state highway renumbering (New York) =

This article is part of the highway renumbering series.
Alabama	1928, 1957
Arkansas	1926
California	1964
Colorado	1953, 1968
Connecticut	1932, 1963
Florida	1945
Indiana	1926
Iowa	1926, 1969
Louisiana	1955
Maine	1933
Massachusetts	1933
Minnesota	1934
Missouri	1926
Montana	1932
Nebraska	1926
Nevada	1976
New Jersey	1927, 1953
New Mexico	1926, 1988
New York	1927, 1930
North Carolina	1934, 1937, 1940, 1961
North Dakota	1926
Ohio	1923, 1927, 1962
Pennsylvania	1928, 1961
Puerto Rico	1953
South Carolina	1928, 1937
South Dakota	1927, 1975
Tennessee	1983
Texas	1939, 1990
Utah	1962, 1977
Virginia	1923, 1928, 1933, 1940, 1958
Washington	1964
Wisconsin	1926
Wyoming	1927

In January 1930, the U.S. state of New York implemented a major renumbering of its state highways. Many previously existing numbered routes were renumbered or realigned. At the same time, many state highways that were previously unnumbered received designations. Most of the highways with numbers in the 100s to 300s were assigned at this time. Route numbers were assigned in clusters based on their general location. Because some of these route numbers are no longer in use, the pattern of clusters is not fully apparent today.

Before 1930, the route numbering system in place had its origins in the 1920s. At the time, New York only assigned numbers to a small subset of its state highways. Route numbers spanned from 1–80, with routes running primarily north–south having even numbers and routes generally running east–west having odd numbers. This scheme was abandoned with the advent of the U.S. Highway System in 1927. Some renumbering was done in 1927 to avoid overlapping route numbers.

== Pre-renumbering routes ==
The table below lists the routes in existence just prior to the 1930 renumbering and the effects of the renumbering on these routes.

Route	From	To	Status in 1930	Modern designation (rough)	Notes
US 1	NYC city line	Connecticut state line	Unchanged	US 1	
US 2	Rouses Point	Vermont state line	Established	US 2	Prior to 1930, US 2 ended in Alburg, Vermont
2	Pennsylvania state line	Rochester	Unchanged	US 15, 15	
3	Tonawanda	Jay (via Malone)	Realigned east of Watertown on a previously unnumbered direct route to Plattsburgh (except that Tupper Lake to Upper Saranac Lake was old 10), from Lockport to Gasport (old route renumbered 77 west of McNalls and 359 east of McNalls), from Middleport to Medina (old route renumbered 3A), and on a previously unnumbered road west to Niagara Falls; old route renumbered 425 (Tonawanda–Niagara Falls), 12E (Watertown–Clayton), 12 (Clayton–Morristown), 37 (Morristown–Malone), 10 (Malone–Paul Smiths), and 86 (Paul Smiths–Jay)	425, 31 to Rochester, 104, US 11, 12E, 12, 37, 30, 86	
US 4	Glens Falls	Vermont state line	Extended to East Greenbush using portions of old 30 and US 9E	US 4	Overlapped with old 30 Glens Falls – Whitehall until 1930
5	Buffalo	Albany	Unchanged	5	5 was later re-extended to Pennsylvania along the Seaway Trail
US 6	Pennsylvania state line	Connecticut state line	Unchanged	US 6	
US 6N	Port Jervis	Kingston	Unchanged	US 209	
7	Binghamton	Vermont state line	Extended south on a previously unnumbered route to Pennsylvania	7	
8	New Jersey state line	Newburgh	Renumbered to 84 (New Jersey–Montgomery), and 215 (Montgomery–Newburgh); number reassigned to unrelated route	284, 211, 17K	
US 9	Waterford	QC line	Realigned along old 9C Round Lake – Albany and extended south along US 9E Rensselaer–NYC; old route renumbered 67 (Round Lake–Mechanicville), and US 4 (Mechanicville–Albany)	US 9	
US 9E	NYC city line	Waterford	Deleted	US 9, US 4	
US 9W	New Jersey state line	Waterford	Truncated to Albany; Albany–Waterford became part of new 32	US 9W, 32	
10	Schenectady	Plattsburgh (via Saranac Lake)	Reassigned to Deposit–QC	5, 50, 9N, US 9, 8, 28, 28N, 30, 86, 3, 374	
US 11	Pennsylvania state line	Rouses Point	Unchanged	US 11	
12	Binghamton	Clayton	Extended east to Alexandria Bay along section of old 3; Realigned between Sherburne and Utica	12 (via 12B)	
13	Horseheads	Cazenovia	Extended north to Chittenango	13	
14	Pennsylvania state line	Alton	Realigned between Watkins Glen and Geneva	14 (via 14A)	
15	Owego	Rochester	Realigned between Victor and Pittsford	96 (via 251 and 64)	
16	Olean	Buffalo	Unchanged	16	
17	Westfield	New Jersey state line	Realigned between Andover and Jasper, and between Olean and Wellsville	394 (via 430), 17, 417, 352, 17, Main St (Chemung), 17C (to Owego), 434, US 11, 17 (via 17M)	Later realigned to expressway
18	Pennsylvania state line	Buffalo	Extended north past Niagara Falls (along old 34) then east to Rochester (along previously unnumbered coastal route)	US 219, 353, US 62	
19	Kingston	Grand Gorge	Deleted; number reassigned to unrelated route	28, 30	
US 20	Pennsylvania state line	Massachusetts state line	Unchanged	US 20 (via US 20A, 39)	
21	Poughkeepsie	Connecticut state line	Renumbered to 200 (Poughkeepsie–Amenia) and 82A (Amenia–Connecticut); number reassigned to unrelated route	US 44, 343	
22	NYC city line	Valatie (via Austerlitz)	Extended north of Austerlitz via old 24 and part of old 30 to QC; Austerlitz–Valatie renumbered to 203	22, 203	
23	Norwich	Massachusetts state line	Extended west to Cincinnatus	23	
24	Austerlitz	Whitehall	Deleted; number reassigned to unrelated route	22	
25	NYC city line	Orient Point	Realigned between NYC and Smithtown	25 (via 25A)	Swapped with 25A west of Smithtown
26	Ithaca	Camillus	Mostly renumbered to 38	366, 38, 38A, 359, 41A, 321	
27	NYC city line	Montauk Point	Unchanged	27	
28	Utica	Oneonta	Extended east to Kingston along old 64 and old 19; Realigned between Cooperstown and Mohawk; Bypassed Utica (Mohawk–Utica became 5S); extended north to Blue Mountain Lake and east to Chestertown along old previously unnumbered route	28, 80, US 20, 167, 168, 5S	
29	Trenton	Salem	West end truncated to Middleville	29	
30	Mechanicville	QC line	Deleted; number reassigned to unrelated route	32, US 4, 32, US 4, 22	
31	Oneida	Lewiston	Unchanged	31, 104	
32	Depew (at NY 5)	Olcott	Renumbered to 78	78	
33	Batavia	Rochester	Extended west to Buffalo	33	
34	Buffalo	Youngstown	Deleted; number reassigned to unrelated route	US 62, 104, 18F	
35	Buffalo	Avon	Unchanged	US 20	
36	Hornell	Geneseo	Unchanged	36	
37	Red Creek	Baldwinsville	Renumbered to 370	370	
38	Belvidere	Penn Yan	Renumbered to 54 (Bath – Penn Yan), 70 (Canona–Garwoods), and 63A (Garwoods–Belvidere)	54, 415, Big Creek Rd, 36, 70, Birdsall Rd	
39	Patterson	Poughkeepsie	Renumbered to 202 (Poughkeepsie – East Fishkill), 52 (East Fishkill – West Patterson), 311 (West Patterson – Patterson)	376, 52, 216, 292, 311	
40	Ithaca	Red Creek	Renumbered to 34 (Ithaca–Auburn) and 370 (Cato – Red Creek)	34, 370, 104A	
41	Barrytown	Millerton	Renumbered to 199	199	
42	Owego	Freeville	Renumbered to 38	38	
43	Schoharie	Albany	Extended east to Denault Corners along unnumbered route then to Massachusetts along old Route 45	443	
44	Sidney	Utica	Deleted; number reassigned to unrelated route	8 (via 51)	
45	Troy	Massachusetts state line	Deleted; number reassigned to unrelated route	66, 43	New England Route 7
46	Oriskany Falls	Boonville	Truncated to Rome; truncated part became part of 26	26, 46	
47	Chestertown	Ticonderoga	Deleted; number reassigned to unrelated route	8	
48	Lowville	Alexandria Bay	Deleted	26	
49	Central Square	Rome	Extended west to Fulton on unnumbered road and east to Utica on old 76	49	
51	Deposit	Stamford	Deleted; number reassigned to unrelated route	10	
52	Geneva	Dansville	Renumbered to 39	245, 21, 63	
53	Horseheads	Candor	Renumbered to 223	223, 224, 34, 96	
54	Utica	Fonda	Deleted; number reassigned to unrelated route	8, 30	
55	New Jersey state line	Goshen	Renumbered to 210 and 17A	210, 17A	
56	Potsdam	Meacham Lake	Renumbered to 72	11B, 458	
57	Syracuse	Oswego	Unchanged	CR 57, 481	
58	Harriman	Newburgh	Renumbered to 32	32	
59	Suffern	Nyack	Unchanged	59	
60	Pennsylvania state line	Fredonia	Unchanged	US 62, 60	
61	Suffern	Haverstraw	Unchanged	US 202	
62	Belvidere	Yates	Renumbered to 19	19, 63	
64	Oneonta	Margaretville	Deleted; number reassigned to unrelated route	28	
66	Claverack	Sand Lake (via Brainard)	Unchanged	66	
68	Ogdensburg	Canton	Extended east to 56	68	
70	Homer	Skaneateles	Renumbered to 41	41	
72	Naples	Pultneyville	Renumbered to 21	21	
74	Varysburg	Point Breeze	Renumbered to 98	98	
76	Rome	Utica	Deleted	49	
78	Watkins Glen	Geneva	Renumbered to 44 and 15A	414, 96A	
80	Indian Lake	Springfield (at US 20)	North end truncated to Nelliston; extended south to Cooperstown then west to New Berlin	80, 10, 8, 30	

== Post-renumbering routes ==
The table below lists the routes in existence immediately following the renumbering, including those established as part of the renumbering. An asterisk (*) in the "Pre-1930 designations" column indicates a segment of highway that was previously unnumbered. If the cell in the "Pre-1930 designations" column is empty, then the entirety of the highway was previously unnumbered.

=== 1–99 ===
Route	From	To	Pre-1930 designations	Modern designation (rough)	Notes
US 1	NYC city line	Connecticut state line	US 1	US 1	
2	Pennsylvania state line	Rochester	2	US 15, 15	
2A	Springwater	Rochester		15A	
3	Niagara Falls	Plattsburgh	*, 3, US 11, *, 10, *, 10	31 (via 31E), 104, 104A, 104, US 11, 3, 3A, 3	
3A	Middleport	Medina	3	31, 63	
3B	Albion	Brockport		98, East Barre Road, 31A	
3C	Crocketts	Watertown		3	
3E	Red Creek	Southwest Oswego		104	
US 4	East Greenbush	Vermont state line	30, *	US 9E, US 4	
5	Buffalo	Albany	5	5	
5S	Oneida	Schenectady	*, 76, 28, *	365, 69, 5S, I-890	
US 6	Pennsylvania state line	Connecticut state line	US 6	US 6	
US 6N	Port Jervis	Kingston	US 6N	US 209	
7	Binghamton	Vermont state line	7	7	
7A	Pennsylvania state line	Corbettsville		7A	
7B	Unadilla	North Franklin		357	
8	Deposit	Montcalm Landing (Putnam Station)	44, 54, *, 47	8	
US 9	NYC state line	QC	US 9, *, US 9	US 9	
US 9W	New Jersey state line	Albany	US 9W	US 9W	
9A	Yonkers	Tarrytown		9A, Old Saw Mill River Road	
9C	Croton-on-Hudson	Peekskill		Mount Airy Road, Washington Street	
9D	Peekskill	Wappingers Falls		US 6, 9D	
9E	Wappingers Falls	northeast of Wappingers Falls		CR 104	
9F	Poughkeepsie	Hyde Park		9G, East Market Street (CR 41)	
9G	Rhinebeck	Hudson		9G	
9H	Bells Pond	Valatie		9H	
9J	Columbiaville	Rennsselaer		9J	
9K	Saratoga Springs	South of Lake George	10	9N	
9L	Glens Falls	Lake George		9L	
9M	Horicon	Chester		CR 55, CR 64, CR 62	
9N	Elizabethtown	Keeseville	9W	9N	
10	Deposit	QC line	51, *, 80, 10A, 10, *, 3, *	10, 8, 30	
US 11	Pennsylvania state line	Rouses Point	US 11	US 11 (via 11A)	
11A	Tully	Onondaga Castle		US 11	
11B	Nicholville	Lawrenceville		(St. Lawrence) CR 55	
12	Binghamton	Alexandria Bay	12, 3	12, 12D, 26, 12	
12A	Chenango Bridge	Chenango Bridge		12A	
12B	Sherburne	Utica	12A, *	12B	
12C	Utica	Barneveld		5A, 69, 291, 365	
12D	Boonville	Lowville		12	via Lyons Falls
12E	Watertown	Clayton	3	12F, 12E	
12F	Brownville	Watertown		12E	
13	Lindley	Lake Ontario	*, 13, *	(Steuben) CR 120, 225, 352, 14, 13	
14	Pennsylvania state line	Sodus Point	14	14	
14A	North of Watkins Glen	West of Geneva	14A	14A	
15	Owego	Rochester	15, *, 15	96, 96B, 96, 251, 64, 31	
15A	Ovid	Geneva	78	96A	
16	Olean	Buffalo	17, 16	16	
17	Westfield	New Jersey state line	17, *, 17, *, 17	394, 430, 951T (permanently flooded), 417, 352, 17M, 17	
17A	Goshen	Greenwood Lake	55	17A	
17B	Hancock	Monticello		97, 17B	
17C	Owego	Binghamton		17C	
17D	Elmira	Pennsylvania state line		Maple Avenue, 427	
17E	Big Flats	West Elmira		352	
17F	Andover	Addison	17	21, 36, (Steuben) CR 119	
17G	Wellsville	Greenwood		19, 248	
17H	Randolph	Salamanca	17A	242, 353	
17J	Mayville	Ashville		394	
18	Pennsylvania state line	Rochester	18, 34, *	US 219, 353, US 62, 18	
19	Pennsylvania state line	Lake Ontario	17, 62	19, 63	
19A	Fillmore	South of Rock Glen		19A	via Castile
US 20	Pennsylvania state line	Massachusetts state line	US 20	US 20, US 20A, 39, US 20	
20A	Pennsylvania state line	Silver Creek		5	
20D	Geneseo	Avon	US 20	39	
21	Pennsylvania state line	Pultneyville	*, 17, *, 72	36, 21, 371, 21	
21A	Middlesex	Canandaigua		364	
22	NYC city line	QC line	22, 24, *, 30	22	
22B	Peru	Morrisonville		22B	
23	South Otselic	Massachusetts state line	23	23	
23A	Prattsville	Catskill	23A	23A	
24	Jamaica	Hampton Bays	*	24, Long Island Avenue, Suffolk Avenue, I-495, 24	
25	NYC city line	Orient Point	25A, 25	25	
25A	NYC city line	Riverhead	25, 25A	25A	
26	Pennsylvania state line	Alexandria Bay	*, 46, *, 12, 48	26, (Jefferson) CR 194, 26	
26A	Lowville	Carthage		812, 126	
27	NYC city line	Montauk Point	27	27	
28	Kingston	Warrensburg	19, 64, 28, *, 29, 12, *, 10A, 10	28	
28N	Blue Mountain Lake	North Creek	10	28N	
29	Middleville	South of Salem	29	29	
29A	Salisbury Center	Pine Lake		29A	
30	East Branch	North of Wells	*, 19, *, 54	30	
31	Lewiston	Utica	31, *	104, 31, Spring Road, Lowell Road, ?	
31A	Niagara Falls	North of Pekin	31A	Lockport Road, 429	
32	Harriman	Glens Falls	32, *, US 9, 30	32	
32A	Bemis Heights	Schuylerville	30	US 4	
32B	Northumberland	Hudson Falls		US 4	
33	Buffalo	Marion	*, 33	33, 441	
34	Waverly	Victory	*, 40	34	
34A	Ithaca	South Lansing		Triphammer Road, 122	
34B	South Lansing	South of Auburn		34B	
35	Buffalo	Ontario Center	35, *	130, US 20, River Road, 383, 96, 286, 350	
36	Hornell	Adams Basin	36, *	36	
36A	Dansville	Greigsville		63	
37	Watertown	Malone	*, 3	37	
38	Owego	Crocketts	42, 26	38	
38A	Moravia	Auburn		38A	
39	East of Dunkirk	West of Geneva	*, 52	39, 436, 21, 245	
40	East Greenbush	Comstock	24	US 4, 40, 22	
41	McClure	Jordan	*, 70, *	41, Jordan Road, Valley Drive, 317	
41A	Northwest of Homer	Skaneateles		41A	
42	Port Jervis	Lexington		42, Claryville Road, Oliverea Road, 42	
43	Schoharie	Massachusetts state line	43, *, 45	443, 43	
44	Caton	Wolcott	*, 78, *	225, 414, 89	
45	New Jersey state line	Newburgh	*, 55, *	94	
46	Pecksport	Boonville	*, 46	46	
46A	Rome	Frenchville		365, 274	via Holland Patent
47	Lake George	Hague		9N	
48	Syracuse	Oswego		Van Buren Road, 48	
49	Fulton	Utica	*, 49, 76	49, River Road	
50	Schenectady	Gansevoort	10	50	
51	Mount Upton	Ilion	44	51	
52	Pennsylvania state line	Sears Corners	*, 39, *, US 6, *	52, 52 BUS, 52, 216, 292, 311, 52, US 6, 312	
52A	North of Fosterdale	Kenoza Lake		52A	
53	Rushville	East of Canandaigua		247	
54	Bath	Dresden	38	54, 54A, 54	
54A	Hammondsport	Penn Yan		54	
55	Barryville	Pawling		55	
56	Sevey	Massena		56	
56A	Potsdam	Norfolk		345, 310, Madrid–Norfolk Road	
57	Syracuse	Oswego	57	CR 57 (Onondaga, Oswego), 481	
58	Morristown	Fine		58	
59	Suffern	Nyack	59	59	
60	Pennsylvania state line	Dunkirk	60	60	
61	Suffern	West Haverstraw	61	US 202	
62	Salamanca	Buffalo		US 219, Edies Road, Mill Street, Springville–Boston Road, 391, 75, 5	
63	Hinsdale	Lake Ontario	17, *	446, (Allegany) CR 20, 19, Old State Road, 408, 63, 19	
63A	Angelica	Dalton	38, *	(Allegany) CR 16, CR 15B, 70	
64	Bristol Springs	Pittsford	*, 15	64	
65	Honeoye	Rochester		CR 37, 65	
66	Claverack	Troy	66, 45	9H, 66	
67	St. Johnsville	Eagle Bridge	*, US 9, *	67	
68	Ogdensburg	Colton	68, *	68	
69	Colosse	Rome	69	69	
70	Whitney Crossings	Avoca	38	70, 961F, Big Creek Road	
71	Hillsdale	Massachusetts		71	
72	Potsdam	Brighton	56	11B, 458	
72A	Potsdam	Hopkinton		72	
73	Tahawus	Ticonderoga		Blue Ridge Road, US 9, 74	
74	Pennsylvania state line	Jamestown		474, 394	
75	Findley Lake	Mayville		430	
76	North Clymer	Ripley		76	
77	Persons Corners	Basom		77	
78	Gainesville	Olcott	*, 32	78	
79	Pennsylvania state line	Ithaca		79	
80	Syracuse	Nelliston	*, 44, *, 80	80	
81	Middleburgh	Coxsackie		145, 81	
82	Washington Hollow	Pine Plains		82	
82A	Millbrook	Massachusetts state line		US 44, 343	
83	Frewsburg	Laona		US 62, 83	
84	New Jersey state line	Montgomery	8	284, 211	
85	Oak Hill	Albany		Camp Medusa Road, CR 351, CR 402, CR 404, CR 401, 143, 85	
86	Lake Clear	Jay	10, 3	186, 86	
86A	Lake Placid	Keene		73	
87	Harrisville	Ogdensburg		812, Stone Road, Pitcairn Road, (St. Lawrence) CR 135, 58, CR 24, CR 21, CR 17, 812	
88	Chapin	Sodus		488, 88	
89	Northeast of Seneca Falls	Resort		89	
90	Messengerville	Montezuma		392, 215, 90	
91	Cincinnatus	Bridgeport		CR 600, CR 600A, 91, 173, US 11, 298	
92	Lyndon	Cazenovia		92	
93	South of Akron	Youngstown		93	
94	Portville	Belfast		305	
95	Moira	Hogansburg		95	
96	Troy	Massachusetts state line		2	
97	Port Jervis	Callicoon		97	
98	Salamanca	Lake Ontario	*, 74	US 219, 98	
99	Duane Center	East of Loon lake		Port Kent Hopkinton Turnpike	

=== 100–199 ===
Route	From	To	Pre-1930 designations	Modern designation (rough)
100	Mount Vernon	Baldwin Place		Central Park Avenue, 100, 118
106	Merrick	Oyster Bay		Newbridge Road, 106
107	Massapequa	Glen Cove		107
110	Amityville	Huntington		110
111	Islip	Smithtown		111
112	Patchogue	Port Jefferson		112
113	East Quogue	Riverhead		(Suffolk) CR 104
114	East Hampton	Greenport		114
116	Peekskill	Connecticut state line		US 202, 116
117	Tarrytown	Mount Kisco		448, 117
118	Croton	Croton Falls		100, US 202
119	Tarrytown	Port Chester		119, Westchester Avenue, 120A
120	Port Chester	Southwest of Armonk		120A, 120
121	Bedford	East of Brewster		121
123	Cross River	Connecticut state line		35, 123
124	Poundridge	South of Brewster		124, 121, (Westchester) CR 310, (Putnam) CR 55
125	Mamaroneck	Scarsdale		125
126	Mamaroneck	White Plains		Mamaroneck Avenue
127	Harrison	White Plains		127
128	Armonk	Mount Kisco		128
129	Croton-on-Hudson	Croton Lake		129
130	Peekskill	Kent Cliffs		Oregon Road, Peekskill Hollow Road
132	Shrub Oak	Katonah		132, 35
132A	Yorktown Heights	Yorktown Heights		Baldwin Road, Mohansic Avenue
133	Ossining	Mount Kisco		133
134	Ossining	Yorktown		134
135	Ossining	Kitchawan		Pinesbridge Road
137	Connecticut state line	East of Katonah		137, 121, Pea Pond Road, Girdle Ridge Road
137A	West of Scotts Corners	Connecticut state line		Westchester Avenue
138	South of Somers	Northwest of Waccabuc		138
139	Whitehall Corners	Lincolndale		139
143	Wolf Hill	Ravena		85, 143
146	Berne	Mechanicville		156, 146
148	Mayfield	Central Bridge	54, *	30A
150	Castleton-on-Hudson	Schodack Center		150
156	Dunnsville	New Scotland		397, 156
158	Parkers Corners	Schenectady		158
159	West of Mariaville	South Schenectady		159
164	Cobleskill	Sharon		145
166	Milford	Cherry Valley		166
167	Richfield Springs	Dolgeville	28, *	167
168	Mohawk	Paines Hollow	28	168
169	Little Falls	Middleville		169
172	Mount Kisco	Bedford		172
173	Ionia	Chittenango		173
174	Otisco	Camillus		Oak Hill Road, Otisco Valley Road, 174
175	Skaneateles	Onondaga Hill		New Seneca Turnpike, 175
176	Meridian	Fulton		176
177	Adams Center	West Lowville		177
179	Chaumont	Depauville		CR 179
180	Perch River	Fishers Landing		180
183	Constantia	Redfield		183, CR 17
187	Dickinson	North Bangor		11B, (Franklin) CR 53
188	Constable	Burke Center		122
189	West of Ellenburg	QC line		189
190	Brainardsville	Ellenburg		Forge Road, (Clinton) CR 5
192	Paul Smiths	Bloomingdale	3, *	86, (Franklin) CR 55, (Essex) CR 81
194	Barnes Corners	Deer River		(Lewis) CR 194, CR 55
195	Elizabethtown	Wadhams		CR 8
199	Barrytown	Connecticut state line	41	(Dutchess) CR 82, 199

=== 200–299 ===
Route	From	To	Pre-1930 designations	Modern designation (rough)
200	Poughkeepsie	Dover Plains	21, *	US 44, 343
201	East of Pine Plains	Copake		82, (Columbia) CR 7, CR 7A
202	Poughkeepsie	East Fishkill	39	376
203	Valatie	Austerlitz	22	203
204	East Chatham	Massachusetts state line		295
205	Oneonta	Oaksville		205
206	Bainbridge	Roscoe		206, CR7, CR91
207	Goshen	Newburgh		207
208	Monroe	Gardiner		208
209	West Barre	Kuckville		(Orleans) CR 99, 98 (mostly overlap), 279
210	New Jersey state line	Stony Point	55, *	210, 17A, CR 106 (Orange, Rockland)
211	Cuddebackville	Middletown		211
212	Mount Tremper	Saugerties		212
213	Boiceville	Kingston		28A, 213
214	Phoenicia	Hunter		214
215	Bloomingburg	Newburgh		17K
216	Southeast of Ludingtonville	Stormville		Ludingtonville Road, 52
217	Claverack	North Hillsdale		217, (Columbia) CR 21C, CR 21
218	Coventryville	Bainbridge		206
219	Whitney Point	Greene		206
220	Smithville Flats	Oxford		220
221	Harford	Marathon		221
222	Groton	Cortland		222
223	Horseheads	Candor	53	223, 224, 34, 96
224	Swartwood	Montour Falls		224
225	Tioga Center	Spencer		(Tioga) CR 7
226	Savona	South of Dundee		226
227	Watkins Glen	Perry City		79, 227
228	Odessa	Mecklenburg		228
230	West Lowville	Dundee		CR 87, 230
235	Nineveh Junction	Coventry		235
237	Stafford	Murray		237
240	Springville	Buffalo		240, Potters Road
241	Randolph	Dayton		241, US 62
242	Little Valley	Ellicottville		242
243	North of Franklinville	Caneadea		98, 243
244	Belmont	Alfred Station		244
245	Castile	Covington		39, 246
247	Naples	Pulteney		53, CR 74
248	Greenwood	Canisteo		248
251	Scottsville	Mendon		251
253	Mumford	West Henrietta		383, 253
254	Hemlock	Canandaigua		US 20A, CR 32
255	Dansville	Conesus		256, Livingston CR 71
256	Groveland	Lakeville		Scottsburg Road, 256, East Lake Road
264	Cattaraugus	East Otto		Cattaraugus CR 12
270	Buffalo	West of Lockport		263, 270
271	Wolcottsville	Middleport		Wolcottsville Road, Griswold Street
275	Bolivar	Friendship		275
276	West Clarksville	Richburg		Jordan Hill Road, Richburg Road
278	Boston	Holland		(Erie) CR 222, 240, CR 240
280	Quaker Bridge	Cold Spring		280
282	Pennsylvania state line	Smithboro		282
283	Pennsylvania state line	Owego		(Tioga) CR 4, CR 6, dismantled, 96
287	Barneveld	West of Wilmurt		365
286	Middle Granville	Vermont state line		22A
299	New Paltz	Highland		299

=== 300–399 ===
Route	From	To	Pre-1930 designations	Modern designation (rough)
300	Leptondale	Walkill		300
301	Cold Spring	Carmel		301
302	Fair Oaks	Pine Bush		302
303	West Nyack	Congers		303
304	Nanuet	Haverstraw		304
305	Monsey	Mount Ivy		45
306	New Jersey state line	Thiells		(Rockland) CR 73, 306, US 202, (Rockland) CR 75
307	Vails Gate	New Windsor		94
308	Rhinecliff	Rock City		308
309	Gloversville	Bleecker		309
311	West Patterson	Patterson	39	311
312	West of Towners	East of Towners		164
313	North of Cambridge	Vermont state line		313
316	Oneida Valley	North of Oneida		316
317	Newport	Wilmurt		Newport Gray Road, Gray Wilmurt Road
319	Preston	Norwich		(Chenango) CR 10A
320	Norwich	Kings Corners		320
321	Skaneateles	Camillus		321
328	Sagetown	Southport		Sagetown Road, 328
328A	Pennsylvania state line	Seely Creek		328
333	Risingville	Campbell		(Steuben) CR 333
337	Borodino	Marietta		174
341	South Dover	Connecticut state line		55
343	Amenia	Connecticut state line	21	343
345	Canton	Waddington		345
364	Middlesex	Penn Yan		364
365	Fisherville	Catlin		Kahler Road, Sing Sing Road, Chambers Road
367	Pennsylvania state line	Lowman		367, Lowman Crossing
369	Port Crane	North Fenton		369
370	East of Red Creek	Baldwinsville	37	(Cayuga) CR 127, 370
371	North Hornell	Wayland		21
372	Greenwich	Cambridge		372
373	Keeseville	Port Kent		373
374	Cadyville	QC line		374
380	Brocton	Kimball Stand		CR 380
396	Callanans Corners	Selkirk		396

=== 400 and up ===
Route	From	To	Pre-1930 designations	Modern designation (rough)
408	South of Harrietstown	Southeast of Gabriels		86
409	Baggs Corner	Limerick		180
410	West of Briggs Corner	Naumburg		410
411	Theresa	Philadelphia		26
415	East Syracuse	Collamer		(Onondaga) CR 77
418	Thurman Station	Warrensburg		418
420	Winthrop	Massena	56	420
422	Southeast of Spring Brook	North of Porterville		(Erie) CR 574
424	Stockton	Cassadaga		(Chautauqua) CR 58
425	North Tonawanda	Wilson		425
426	Pennsylvania state line	Pennsylvania state line		426
427	Euba Mills	South of Keene		73
