= New York State Route 139 =

State highway in Westchester County, New York, US

New York State Route 139
- Primrose Street
- Map of Westchester County in southeastern New York with NY 139 highlighted in red

Route information
- Maintained by NYSDOT
- Length: 2.81 mi (4.52 km)
- Existed: c. 1931–present

Major junctions
- South end: NY 100 in Somers
- North end: US 202 in Somers

Location
- Country: United States
- State: New York
- Counties: Westchester

Highway system
- New York Highways; Interstate; US; State; Reference; Parkways
← NY 138	→ NY 140

New York State Route 139 (NY 139) is a 2.81-mile (4.52 km) state highway located within the town of Somers in Westchester County, New York, in the United States. It connects the hamlet of Whitehall Corners at an intersection with NY 100 with the hamlet of Lincolndale at a junction with U.S. Route 202 (US 202). The entirety of NY 139, known as Primrose Street, was assigned in the early 1930s.

== Route description ==
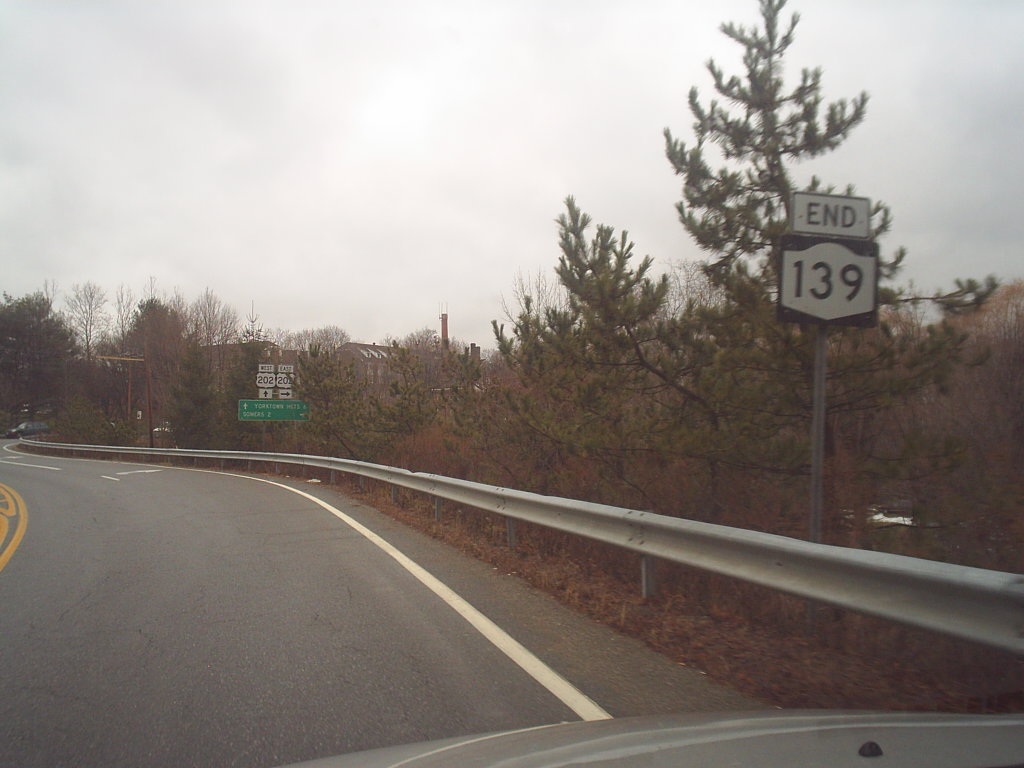
NY 139 north at US 202 in the town of Somers

NY 139 begins at an intersection with NY 100 (Croton Turnpike) in the town of Somers. It proceeds northeast as a two-lane highway named Primrose Street, winding its way northeast through a residential area of Somers. The homes soon give way to wooded areas, and NY 139 bends north-northeastward into another residential area north of Plum Brook Road. NY 139 turns northwest, passing a local cemetery and the Wright Reis House and soon the Somers Reis Park.

The route continues northwest, remaining a residential street near Sunderland Lane, entering a commercial district north of Foley Road. NY 139 winds its way north past Anglebrook Golf Club, bending west at a junction with Brick Hill Road. A short distance after the bend, NY 139 intersects US 202 (East Lovell Street). This junction serves as the northern terminus of NY 139, while the right-of-way continues west as US 202 and Lincolndale Avenue.

== History ==
Primrose Street was first improved by the state of New York as part of a project contracted out by the state on August 31, 1915. The highway cost $30,355 to reconstruct (equivalent to $744,998 in 2024), and the rebuilt road was added to the state highway system on February 15, 1917, as unsigned State Highway 1325 (SH 1325). In the 1930 renumbering of state highways in New York, hundreds of state-maintained highways were assigned posted route numbers for the first time. SH 1325 was designated as NY 139 by the following year, and the alignment of NY 139 has not changed since that time.

== Major intersections ==
The entire route is in Somers, Westchester County.

mi	km	Destinations	Notes
0.00	0.00	NY 100 – Somers, Millwood	Southern terminus; hamlet of Whitehall Corners
2.81	4.52	US 202 – Yorktown Heights, Somers	Northern terminus; hamlet of Lincolndale
1.000 mi = 1.609 km; 1.000 km = 0.621 mi
