= Connecticut Route 124 =

State highway in Fairfield County, Connecticut, US

Route 124
- Map of Fairfield County in southwestern Connecticut with Route 124 highlighted in red

Route information
- Maintained by CTDOT
- Length: 9.41 mi (15.14 km)
- Existed: 1966–present

Major junctions
- South end: US 1 in Darien
- Route 15 / Merritt Parkway in New Canaan
- North end: Westchester Avenue at the New York state line in Scotts Corners, NY

Location
- Country: United States
- State: Connecticut
- Counties: Fairfield

Highway system
- Connecticut State Highway System; Interstate; US; State; SSR; SR; Scenic
← Route 123	→ Route 125

Route 124 is a state highway in southwestern Connecticut running from downtown Darien through the center of New Canaan to the state line in Scotts Corners, New York.

== Route description ==
Route 124 begins as Mansfield Avenue at an intersection with US 1 in Downtown Darien near the Darien train station. It proceeds north for about 2.7 miles (4.3 km) towards New Canaan. In New Canaan, the road becomes South Avenue and soon meets an interchange with Route 15 (Merritt Parkway). After passing by Saxe Middle School, Route 124 enters the town center of New Canaan, where it has a 0.6-mile (0.97 km) overlap with Route 106. After running briefly on Main Street, Route 124 heads out of the town center as Oenoke Ridge. Route 124 runs for another 4.2 miles (6.8 km) in the rural part of New Canaan until the New York state line. Across the state line, the road become continues into Pound Ridge as Westchester Avenue. Route 124 is classified as a principal arterial road between US 1 and Route 15 and as a minor arterial road north of Route 15. It carries an average traffic volume of about 7,600 vehicles per day.

== History ==
In the 1920s, the road connecting the town centers of Darien and New Canaan was known as State Highway 302. Another road from Norwalk through New Canaan center and continuing to Pound Ridge in New York was State Highway 184. In the 1932 state highway renumbering, Route 29 was created as a renumbering of old Highway 184. At the same time, Route 123 was created as a renumbering of old Highway 302. Two years later, however, Route 29 south of New Canaan center and Route 123 were swapped and Route 29 now corresponded to the modern Route 124 alignment. At that time, Route 29 continued across the state line as New York Route 137A, which was renumbered to Route 394 by 1947. In 1966, New York State Route 124 was extended southward along old New York Route 394 via an overlap with New York State Route 137. Connecticut renumbered Route 29 to Route 124 to match the number in New York. By 1990, New York shortened its Route 124 to its current southern terminus and the portion corresponding to old New York Route 394 is now a local road.

== Junction list ==
The entire route is in Fairfield County.

Location	mi	km	Destinations	Notes
Darien	0.00	0.00	US 1 (Post Road) – Norwalk, Stamford	Southern terminus
New Canaan	3.09	4.97	Route 15 / Merritt Parkway – New Haven, New York City	Exit 14 on Merritt Parkway
New Canaan	4.57	7.35	Route 106 south – Stamford	Southern end of Route 106 concurrency
New Canaan	5.19	8.35	Route 106 north (East Avenue)	Northern end of Route 106 concurrency
New Canaan	9.41	15.14	Westchester Avenue – Pound Ridge, Scotts Corners	Continuation into New York; former NY 124
1.000 mi = 1.609 km; 1.000 km = 0.621 mi: Concurrency terminus
