= Goldens Bridge, New York =

- Census-designated place
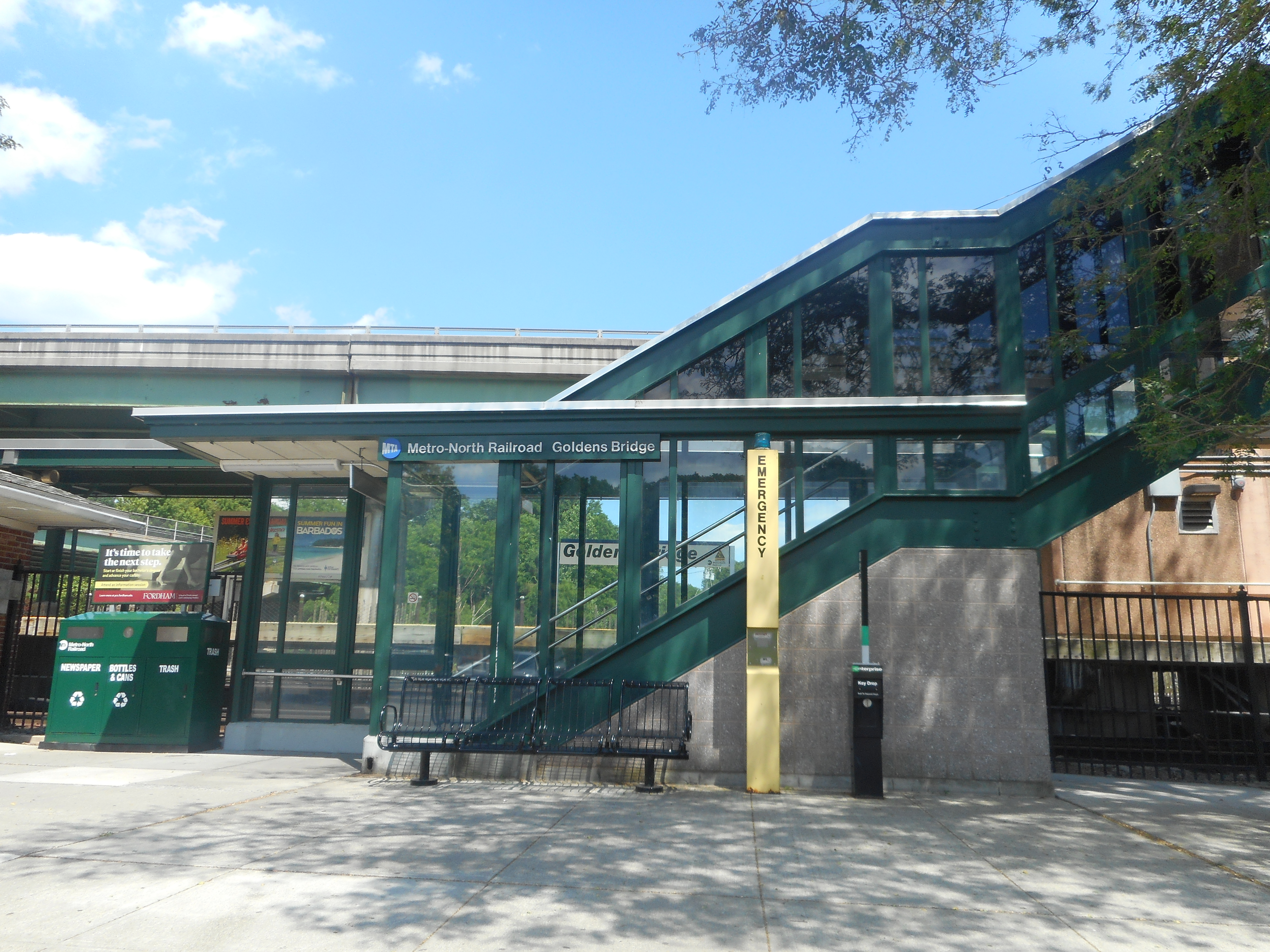
- Goldens Bridge station entrance

- Location of Goldens Bridge, New York
- Coordinates: 41°17′16″N 73°40′7″W
- Country: United States
- State: New York
- County: Westchester
- Town: Lewisboro

Area
  - Total: 2.54 sq mi (6.58 km^{2})
  - Land: 2.41 sq mi (6.24 km^{2})
  - Water: 0.13 sq mi (0.34 km^{2})
- Elevation: 217 ft (66 m)

Population (2020)
  - Total: 1,628
  - Density: 675.3/sq mi (260.75/km^{2})
- Time zone: UTC-5 (Eastern (EST))
  - Summer (DST): UTC-4 (EDT)
- ZIP code: 10526 or 10536
- Area code: 914
- FIPS code: 36-29476
- GNIS feature ID: 0951294

Goldens Bridge is a hamlet and census-designated place (CDP) in the town of Lewisboro in Westchester County, New York, United States. The population was 1,630 at the 2010 census.

Goldens Bridge is in the western part of the town, adjacent to Interstate 684 and the Croton River. The community is a suburb of New York City, as it is located approximately 40 miles (48 km) north of Midtown Manhattan.

== History ==
According to The New York Times, Colonial geographers and surveyors identified a crossing over the Croton River in the Goldens Bridge area as early as 1750. Early maps included different names, including Coldens Bridge, Goldings Bridge and Goldens Bridge. The bridge was washed away and rebuilt a number of times in flooding today controlled by the dams and reservoirs of the New York City water supply system's Croton Watershed. The area around the crossing grew into a depot for farm produce from Connecticut and Salem, New York, and a stop for travelers along the river. The bridge is gone, as the crossing where it stood lies under the New Croton Reservoir, which was created when the Croton River was dammed around the turn of the 20th century.

Bridge L-158, a railroad bridge crossing the Muscoot Reservoir near Goldens Bridge, was listed on the National Register of Historic Places in 1978.

== Geography ==
Goldens Bridge is located at 41°17′16″N 73°40′7″W (41.287896, -73.668630).

According to the United States Census Bureau, the CDP has a total area of 2.5 square miles (6.6 km^{2}), of which 2.4 square miles (6.3 km^{2}) is land and 0.12 square miles (0.3 km^{2}), or 5.19%, is water.

=== Terrain ===
Goldens Bridge has a diverse terrain of several rocky hills, mostly with stones deposited during the retreat of the last ice age. It is largely forested, and includes many streams and lakes, and borders both the Muscoot and Cross River reservoirs.

== Demographics ==
Historical population
Census	Pop.	Note	%±
2020	1,628		—
U.S. Decennial Census

As of the census of 2000, there were 1,578 people, 572 households, and 431 families residing in the CDP. The population density was 503.8 inhabitants per square mile (194.5/km^{2}). There were 607 housing units at an average density of 193.8 per square mile (74.8/km^{2}). The racial makeup of the CDP was 95.31% White, 1.39% African American, 2.34% Asian, 0.13% from other races, and 0.82% from two or more races. Hispanic or Latino of any race were 2.28% of the population.

There were 572 households, out of which 43.4% had children under the age of 18 living with them, 65.9% were married couples living together, 8.6% had a female householder with no husband present, and 24.5% were non-families. 19.1% of all households were made up of individuals, and 5.8% had someone living alone who was 65 years of age or older. The average household size was 2.76 and the average family size was 3.20.

In the CDP, the population was spread out, with 30.5% under the age of 18, 3.4% from 18 to 24, 31.9% from 25 to 44, 25.1% from 45 to 64, and 9.0% who were 65 years of age or older. The median age was 37 years. For every 100 females, there were 92.7 males. For every 100 females age 18 and over, there were 89.0 males.

The median income for a household in the CDP was $106,323, and the median income for a family was $113,460. Males had a median income of $81,072 versus $42,292 for females. The per capita income for the CDP was $52,050. About 2.5% of families and 2.4% of the population were below the poverty line, including 3.6% of those under age 18 and 7.7% of those age 65 or over.

== Education ==
The Katonah-Lewisboro School District serves Golden's Bridge. Students attend the Increase Miller Elementary School in Golden's Bridge, John Jay Middle School, and John Jay High School in Cross River.
