= Long Ridge Village Historic District =

Historic district in Connecticut, United States

- U.S. National Register of Historic Places
- U.S. Historic district
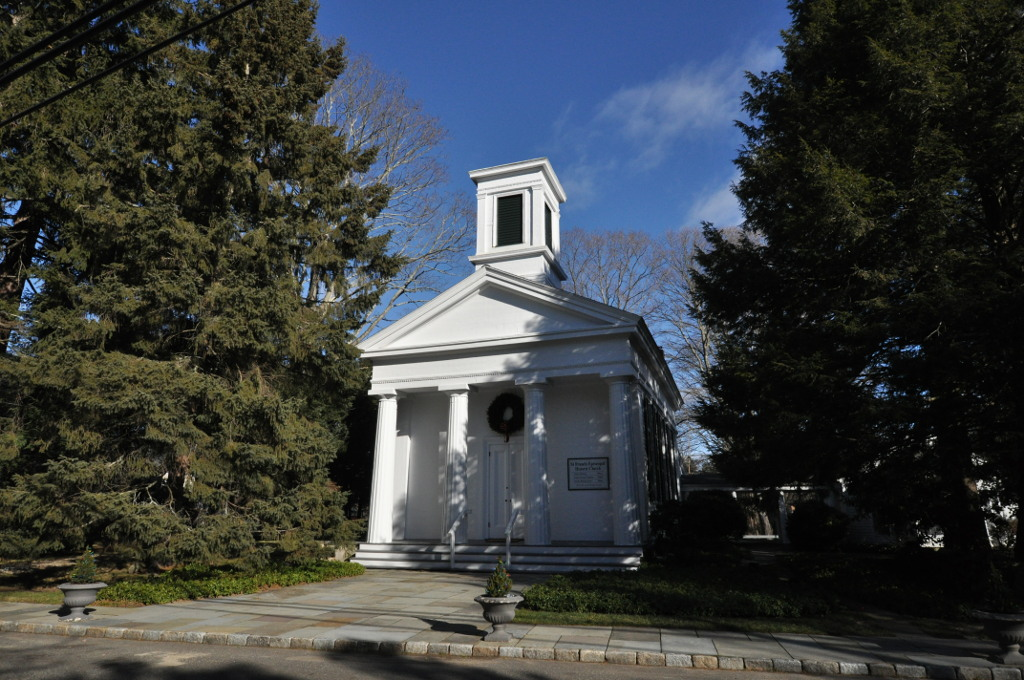
- St. Francis Episcopal Church

- Location within Connecticut Location within the United States
- Location: Old Long Ridge Road bounded by the New York State Line, Rock Rimmon Road, and Long Ridge Road/CT 104, Stamford, Connecticut
- Coordinates: 41°9′20″N 73°35′37″W
- Built: 1750
- Architect: Platt, John
- Architectural style: Colonial Revival, Greek Revival, Federal
- NRHP reference No.: 86003653
- Added to NRHP: June 2, 1987

The Long Ridge Village Historic District is a historic district in the city of Stamford, Connecticut. The district, located in rural northern Stamford near the border with New York, was listed on the National Register of Historic Places in 1987. Although the district includes a few early 19th-century properties, the area was most heavily developed between 1850 and 1920, and was a local center of shoe manufacturing until it was bypassed by railroads, sending the business nearer to downtown Stamford. The district extends along Old Long Ridge Road, and includes several property on adjacent Rock Rimmon Road. There are 34 historically significant houses, and two churches.

Significant contributing properties include:

- St. Francis Episcopal Church, 503 Old Long Ridge Road, (see #11 in photo set accompanying NRHP document)
- Hickford Marshall House, 528 Old Long Ridge Road (see accompanying photo #12)
