= Connecticut Route 116 =

State highway in Fairfield County, Connecticut, US

Route 116
- Map of Fairfield County in southwestern Connecticut with Route 116 highlighted in red

Route information
- Maintained by CTDOT
- Length: 4.24 mi (6.82 km)
- Existed: 1966–present

Major junctions
- South end: Route 35 in Ridgefield
- North end: NY 116 at the New York state line in North Salem, NY

Location
- Country: United States
- State: Connecticut
- Counties: Fairfield

Highway system
- Connecticut State Highway System; Interstate; US; State; SSR; SR; Scenic
← Route 115	→ Route 117

Route 116 is a 4.24-mile-long (6.82 km) state highway entirely within Ridgefield, Connecticut that runs from the Ridgefield town center at Route 35 to the New York state line, where New York State Route 116 continues towards the hamlet of North Salem.

== Route description ==
Route 116 begins in downtown Ridgefield, splitting off from Main Street (Route 35). While Route 35 heads northeast towards downtown Danbury, Route 116 heads northwest along North Salem Road towards the New York state line. North Salem Road travels through the more rural areas of Ridgefield. North Salem Road reaches Mamanasco Lake about 3.1 miles (5.0 km) later where it also intersects with Ridgebury Road, which leads to the Ridgebury section of town and to the old Union Carbide center in western Danbury. Route 116 then passes by the Ridgefield High School and Scotts Ridge Middle School after another 0.3 miles (0.48 km). Route 116 continues along North Salem Road for another 0.8 miles (1.3 km) where it crosses the state line and becomes New York State Route 116. For its entire length in Ridgefield, Route 116 is designated the Elizabeth M. Leonard Memorial Highway.

== History ==
In the 1920s, the Ridgefield to North Salem route was a primary state highway designated as Highway 146. In the 1932 state highway renumbering, Highway 146 became incorporated into the newly established Route 33. In 1966, Route 33 was shortened to end at Route 35 in Ridgefield center and the 4.2-mile (6.8 km) piece west of Route 35 was renumbered to Route 116 in order to match the route number in New York.

== Junction list ==
The entire route is in Ridgefield, Fairfield County.

mi	km	Destinations	Notes
0.00	0.00	Route 35 – Ridgefield, Danbury	Southern terminus
4.24	6.82	NY 116 west – North Salem	Continuation into New York
1.000 mi = 1.609 km; 1.000 km = 0.621 mi
