= New York State Route 172 =

State highway in Westchester County, New York, US

New York State Route 172
- Map of Westchester County in southeastern New York with NY 172 highlighted in red

Route information
- Maintained by NYSDOT
- Length: 8.89 mi (14.31 km)
- Existed: 1930–present

Major junctions
- West end: NY 117 in Mount Kisco
- I-684 in Bedford
- East end: NY 137 in Pound Ridge

Location
- Country: United States
- State: New York
- Counties: Westchester

Highway system
- New York Highways; Interstate; US; State; Reference; Parkways
← NY 171	→ NY 173

New York State Route 172 (NY 172) is an 8.89-mile (14.31 km) state highway in Westchester County, New York, in the United States. The route runs from NY 117 in the village of Mount Kisco east to the hamlet of Pound Ridge at NY 137.

== Route description ==
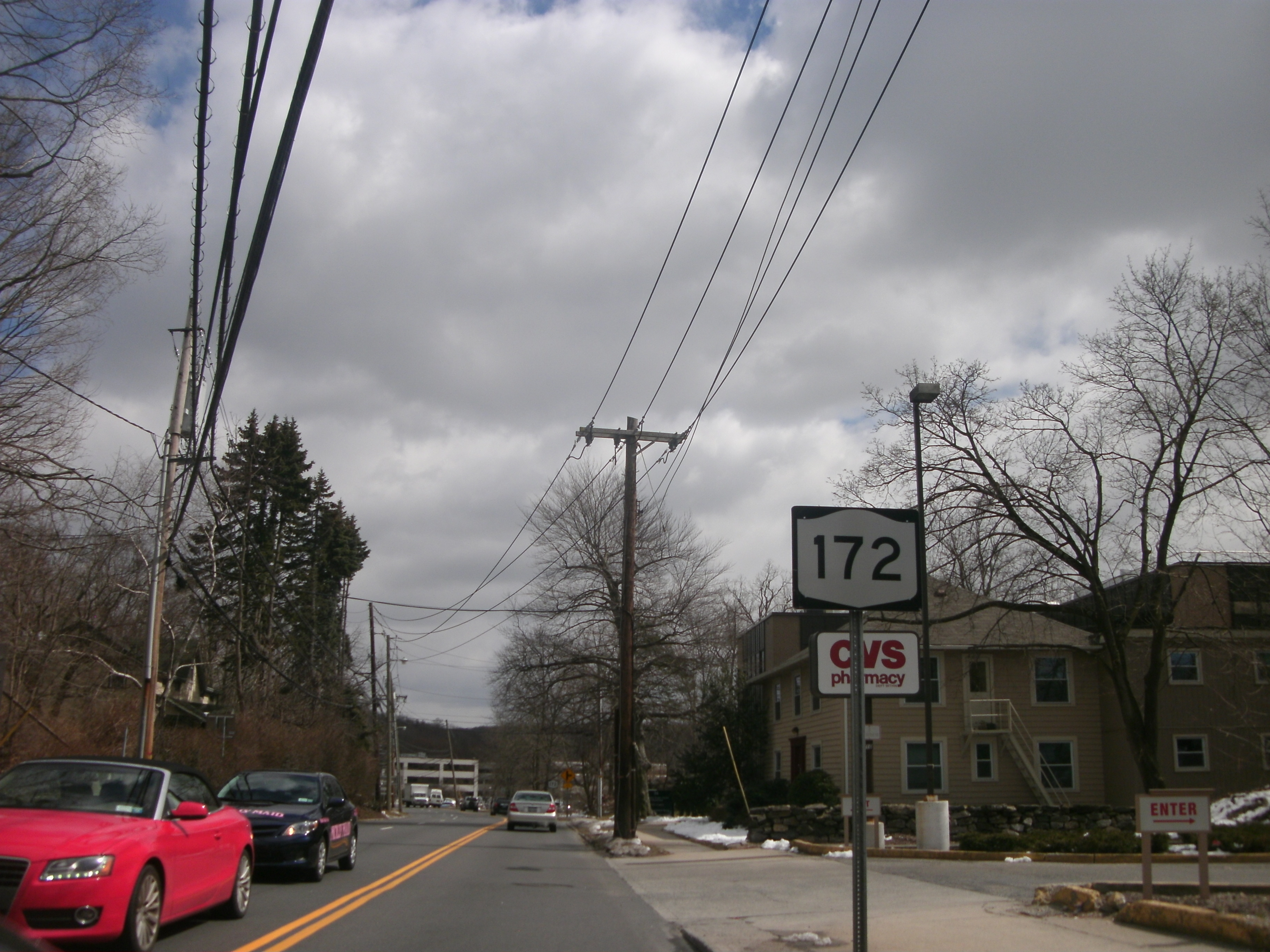
NY 172 east from the intersection with NY 117 in Mount Kisco

NY 172 begins at a large junction with NY 117 (Main Street) just south of downtown in the village of Mount Kisco. NY 172 proceeds eastward through Mount Kisco as South Bedford Road, a two-lane commercial street before leaving Mount Kisco for the town of Bedford. After crossing into Bedford, NY 172 becomes a two-lane road through dense woods before bending eastward into a small commercial stretch at West Patent Road. After West Patent, NY 172 makes a bend to the southeast, returning to the dense woods, which soon gets split by residences on both sides of the roadway. NY 172 continues winding its way southeast through the town of Bedford, soon entering exit 4 of I-684, which crosses over the highway through Bedford.

After I-684, NY 172 continues southeast as South Bedford Road, a short distance as a two-lane wooded road, before commercial businesses appear near Baldwin Road. At this junction, NY 172 turns northeast, proceeding towards the census-designated place of Bedford (also known as Bedford Village), passing the high school. At Clark Road, the route bends southeast, entering the downtown section, where it intersects with NY 22 (Old Post Road). NY 172 and NY 22 become concurrent, proceeding northeast through the village, becoming a two-lane commercial street near Hunting Ridge Mall. Near Washington Avenue, the surroundings become residential before entering the village green, where NY 22 proceeds north and NY 172 forks to the southeast on Pound Ridge Road.

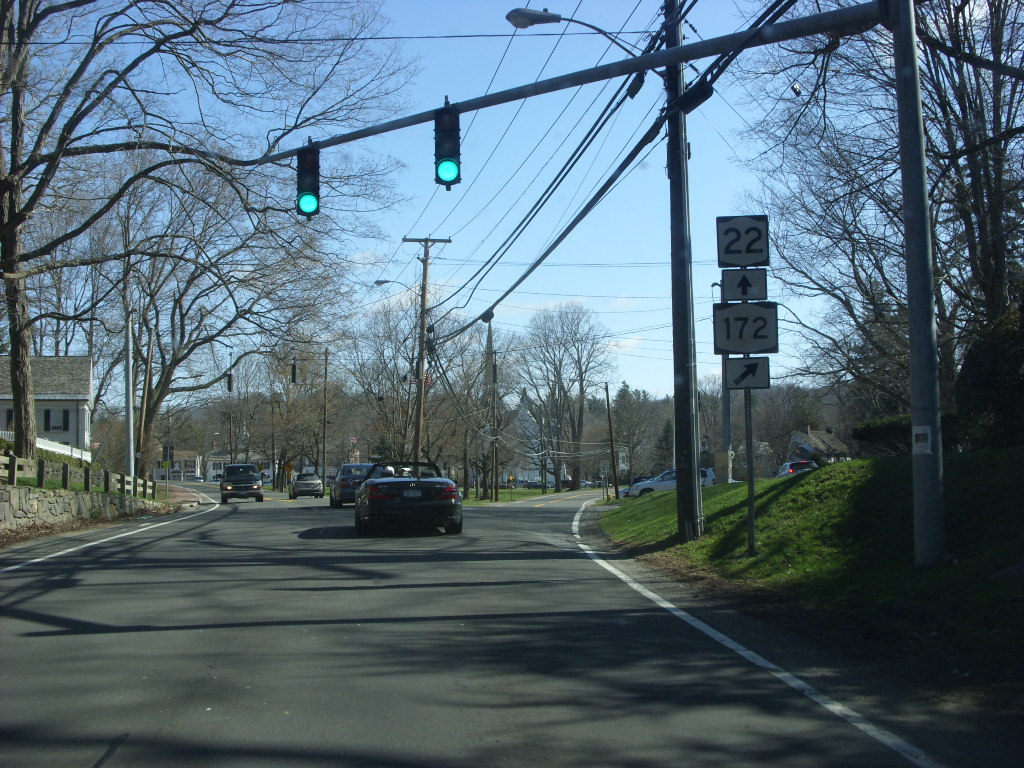
NY 172 forking eastward from NY 22 north in Bedford Village

Southeast of the village green, NY 172 proceeds southeast through Bedford as a two-lane residential roadway, paralleling the Mianus River, which runs south of the roadway. The route continues eastward through Bedford, crossing a junction with Long Ridge Road and continues northeast as the two-lane residential street. At the junction with Hickory Lane, NY 172 bends southeast, becoming a two-lane densely wooded street once again. Near Appleby Road, this reverses as NY 172 starts evening eastward as a residential street. Passing several ponds, the roadway enters the town of Pound Ridge at the shores of Blue Heron Lake. Near the lake, NY 172 proceeds northeast as a two-lane residential street, soon bending eastward into the hamlet. In the hamlet of Pound Ridge, NY 172 becomes a commercial street, intersecting with NY 137 (Westchester Avenue). This intersection serves as the eastern terminus for NY 172.

== History ==
NY 172 was established as part of the 1930 renumbering of state highways in New York. Originally, it only extended between Mount Kisco and Bedford Village. The section east of NY 22 was originally maintained by Westchester County as part of County Route 3 (CR 3) from NY 22 to Long Ridge Road and as CR 103 from Long Ridge Road to NY 137. On September 1, 1980, ownership and maintenance of Pound Ridge Road between Bedford and Pound Ridge was transferred from the county to the state of New York as part of a larger highway maintenance swap between the two levels of government. Pound Ridge Road became an extension of NY 172 following the swap.

== Major intersections ==
The entire route is in Westchester County.

Location	mi	km	Destinations	Notes
Mount Kisco	0.00	0.00	NY 117 – Pleasantville, Katonah	Western terminus
Town of Bedford	2.13	3.43	I-684 – Brewster, White Plains	Exit 4 on I-684
Town of Bedford	3.89	6.26	NY 22 south – Armonk	Western end of NY 22 concurrency
Town of Bedford	4.92	7.92	NY 22 north	Eastern end of NY 22 concurrency; hamlet of Bedford
Town of Bedford	5.06	8.14	To NY 22 north	Access via Village Green
Pound Ridge	8.89	14.31	NY 137	Eastern terminus
1.000 mi = 1.609 km; 1.000 km = 0.621 mi: Concurrency terminus

== See also ==
- List of county routes in Westchester County, New York
