= Cross River, New York =

Hamlet in New York state, U.S.

Cross River is a hamlet within the town of Lewisboro, New York, at the northern end of Westchester County.

Cross River is primarily a suburban residential area, with a strictly enforced zoning code. John Jay High School is located there.

Sites of interest include the Trailside Nature Museum, Ward Pound Ridge Reservation, and the Cross River Reservoir fishing area.

The Lewisboro Town Park is in the hamlet.
