= U.S. Route 202 in New York =

Segment of American highway

U.S. Route 202
- US 202 highlighted in red and US 202 Alt. in blue

Route information
- Maintained by NYSDOT and Westchester County
- Length: 55.57 mi (89.43 km)
- Existed: June 1934(signage was not up until April 1, 1935)–present

Major junctions
- West end: US 202 / CR 507 at the New Jersey state line in Suffern
- NY 45 / CR 47 / Palisades Parkway in Pomona; US 9W in Haverstraw; US 6 / Palisades Parkway / US 9W / US 6 Truck in Bear Mountain State Park; US 9 / US 6 Alt. / US 202 Alt. in Cortlandt; Bear Mountain State Parkway in Peekskill; US 9 in Peekskill; Bear Mountain State Parkway in Cortlandt and Crompond; Taconic State Parkway in Crompond; NY 100 in Somers; US 6 in Brewster; I-684 / NY 22 in Southeast
- East end: US 6 / US 202 at the Connecticut state line in Brewster

Location
- Country: United States
- State: New York
- Counties: Rockland, Orange, Westchester, Putnam

Highway system
- United States Numbered Highway System; List; Special; Divided; New York Highways; Interstate; US; State; Reference; Parkways
← NY 201	→ NY 203

U.S. Route 202 (US 202) is a part of the U.S. Highway System that runs from New Castle, Delaware, to Bangor, Maine. In the U.S. state of New York, US 202 extends 55.57 miles (89.43 km) from the New Jersey state line near Suffern to the Connecticut state line east of Brewster. While most of US 202 is signed north–south, the portion within New York is signed east–west. It drifts north slowly as it crosses southern New York. US 202 is the only road to cross New York between New Jersey and Connecticut and not pass through New York City on the way.

US 202's New York stretch is roughly bisected by the Hudson River. West of it, the highway runs northeast, east and north along the edge of suburbia in Rockland County to Bear Mountain Bridge; to the east, it follows a mainly east–west orientation except for the New York State Route 22 (NY 22) concurrency between Croton Falls and Brewster. It is mostly a two-lane road, expanding to four in some busier sections, with a brief freeway stretch in Peekskill.

As it does in other states, US 202 serves mainly as a local road in suburban and exurban communities along the outskirts of the metropolitan area, mostly two lanes with the exception of some four-lane sections and a brief concurrency onto a freeway in Peekskill. Its course along the Hudson River takes it first north up the west side, over the historic Bear Mountain Bridge, then south along the east side. It takes in many scenic areas, such as the Ramapo Mountains and Hudson Highlands, and two New York City reservoirs.

Its circuitous path across the state puts it on many concurrencies—only 14.5 miles (23.3 km), or 26%, of US 202's mileage in New York is signed as US 202 alone. Among the roads it joins are three U.S. highways and two state routes. It forms four three-route concurrencies, including the only such grouping of three U.S. routes in the state, again in Peekskill.

== Route description ==
=== Rockland and Orange counties ===
The left turn that brings US 202 into New York and the village of Suffern puts it on Orange Avenue, paralleling the old Main Line of the Erie Railroad past the Suffern train station and into the village's downtown. In the shadow of the New York State Thruway, it meets its first New York state highway, NY 59, and has a brief wrong-way concurrency with it.

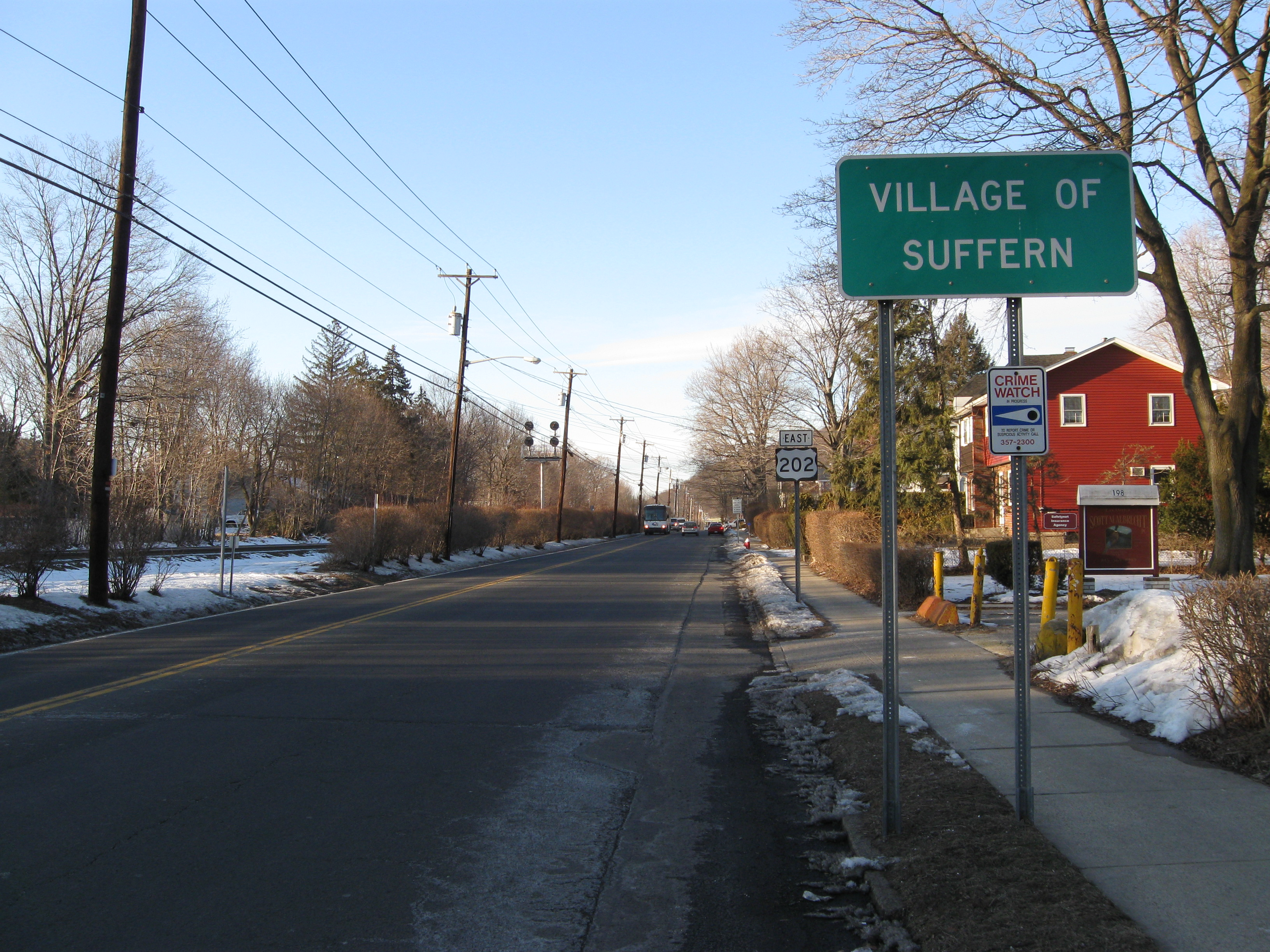
US 202's first reassurance shield after entering New York in Suffern.

Leaving Suffern behind to return to the northeastern heading it had followed across New Jersey, it crosses under the Thruway without an interchange, the end of a close parallel with Interstate 287 (I-287) that began north of Somerville, New Jersey. It remains a two-lane route at the edge of development past Pomona and Montebello, at the foot of the Ramapo Mountains, home to the vast Harriman State Park. The headwaters of the Mahwah River parallel closely.

At Ladentown, the northern terminus of NY 306, the road begins to curve to the east, away from the ridge. US 202 widens as it cuts across the county, still a little less developed here, towards Mount Ivy, where it has a full interchange with the Palisades Interstate Parkway and NY 45. The Long Path hiking trail also crosses here. Beyond this junction US 202 is a four-lane undivided road, surrounded mainly by office parks and commercial establishments, but not strip development, as it follows the curve of South Mountain to the south.

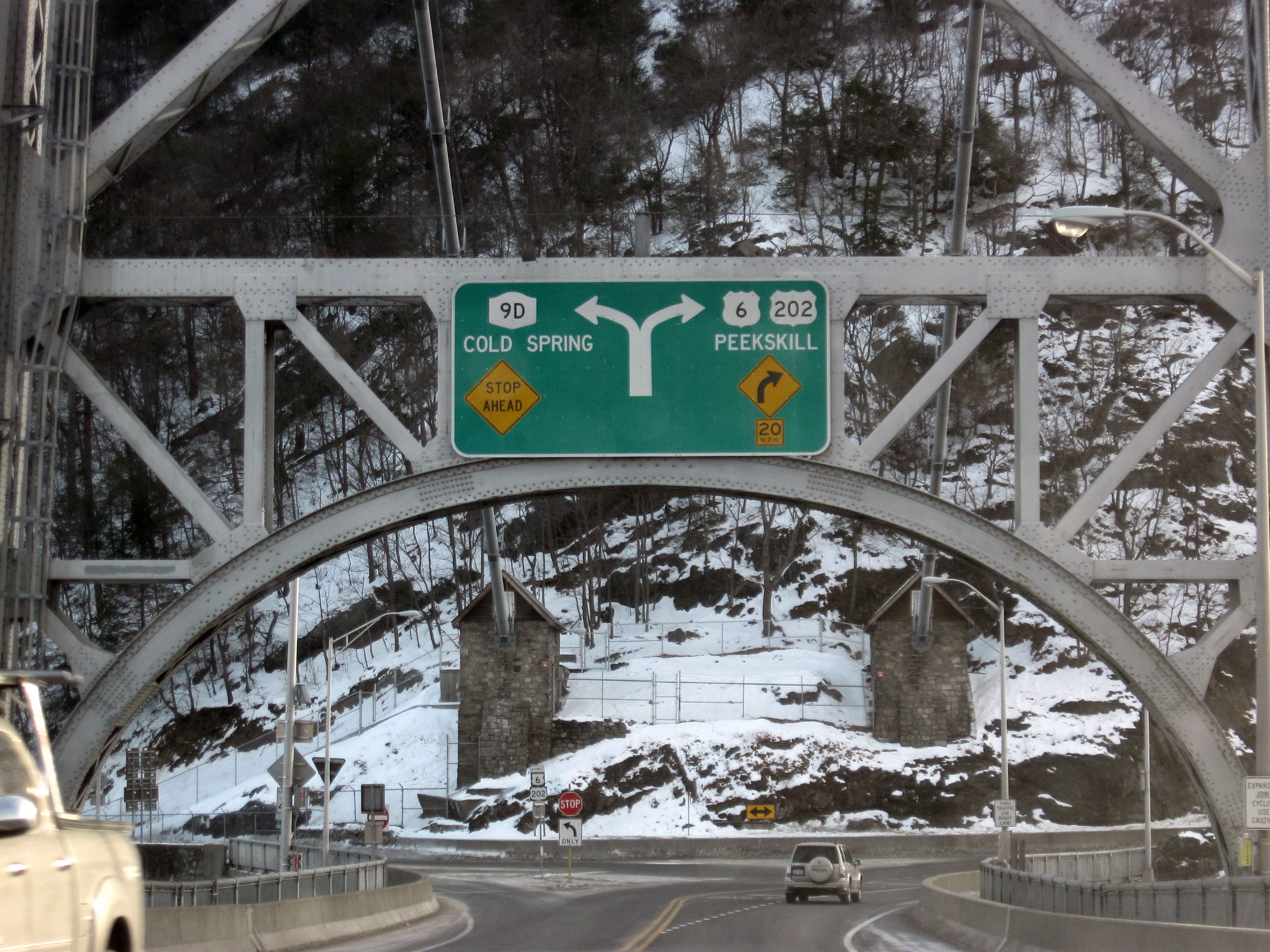
US 6 and US 202 cross the Bear Mountain Bridge between Orange and Westchester counties.

Development starts to increase in West Haverstraw, and at Haverstraw, the road makes an oblique intersection with US 9W and joins it, following the Hudson River north through Stony Point and then climbing the mountains near Jones Point and Bear Mountain State Park, descending to the river's level again to reach the popular picnic ground complex at Hessian Lake. Here the Appalachian Trail (AT) crosses under the road to its lowest elevation in the nearby Trailside Zoo.

After ten miles (16 km), the US 9W concurrency comes to an end at Bear Mountain Circle, shortly after crossing into Orange County, also the Palisades Parkway's north end. US 6 replaces US 9W as the two join the AT in going through the tollbooths and crossing the Bear Mountain Bridge, entering Cortlandt in Westchester County, just south of the Putnam County line. Both US 6 and US 202 will enter Putnam County later in their routes, but for now they veer southeast, staying in Westchester.

=== Westchester County ===
In most of northern Westchester, US 202, primarily as part of concurrencies, serves as a local road between the towns it passes through. It skirts the one Putnam County village along its path, and is mostly a rural road in that county, expanded to four lines at its easternmost portion.

At the end of the bridge the AT leaves with NY 9D, which begins to follow the river north to Beacon and Wappingers Falls here. Routes 6 and 202 turn right to follow the NRHP-listed Bear Mountain Bridge Road. The two wind around Anthony's Nose high above the river, with occasional views to Haverstraw Bay and the city of Peekskill to the south, and Dunderberg Mountain, Iona Island and the sections of US 9W the highway had just followed upriver.

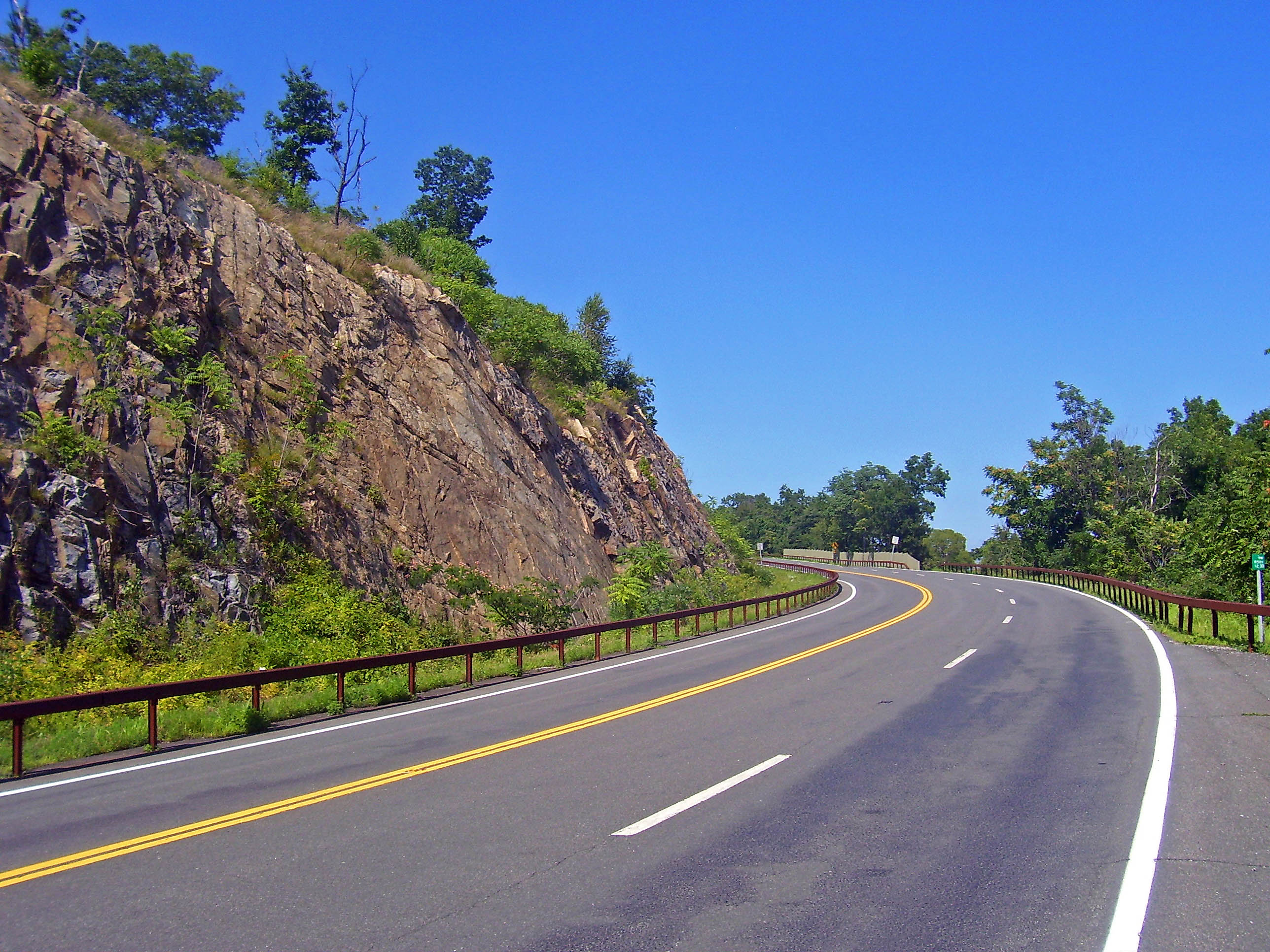
Mountains along US 9W and US 202 north of Stony Point.

Three and a half miles (5.6 km) US 6 and US 202 descend to river level again and, after passing the entrance to the New York National Guard base at Camp Smith, reach Annsville Circle. Here they form New York's only three-way concurrency of U.S. highways with US 9, then cross the Jans Peeck Bridge over Annsville Creek into the city and turn right onto the north end of the Croton Expressway, while the Bear Mountain Parkway begins to the east. At the second exit in Peekskill, the two routes leave US 9. NY 35 begins here and replaces it in the overlap, following Main Street across the city. At South Broad Street US 202 and NY 35 turn right while US 6 continues along Main, ending the first overlap between US 6 and US 202.

A few blocks to the south, US 202 and NY 35 turn left onto Crompond Road, which takes them out of Peekskill and back into the town of Cortlandt. The two roads pass the Hudson Valley Hospital Center. Two miles later, Bear Mountain Parkway returns to US 202 for the eastern terminus of its western segment. Shortly afterwards it and Route 35 enter Yorktown.

Here the road trends to the south, and the eastern segment of Bear Mountain Parkway branches off to the left to provide access to the Taconic State Parkway, the main north–south trunk route for automobile traffic on the east side of the Hudson. An exit here allows access to neighboring Franklin D. Roosevelt State Park.

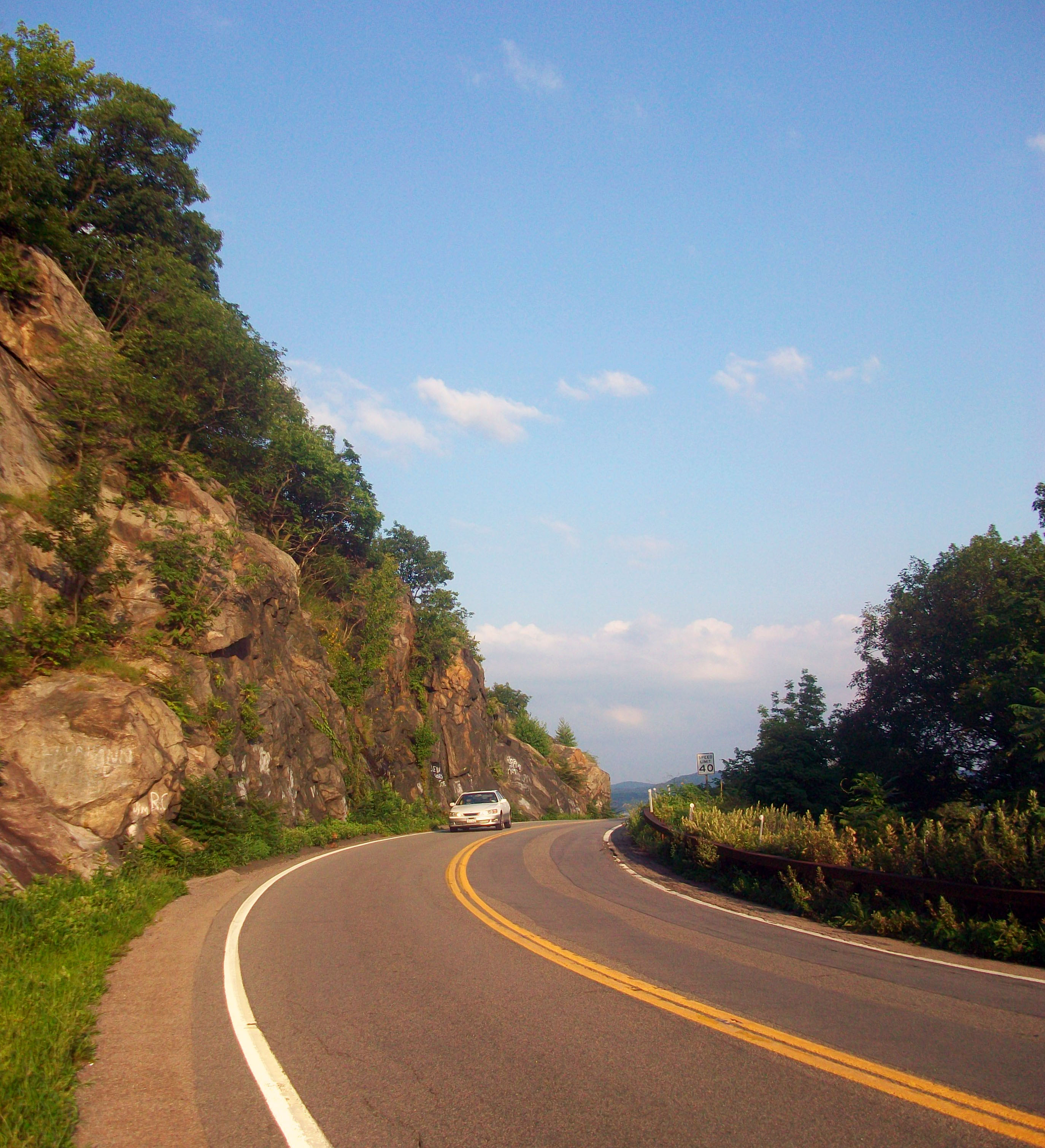
Much of US 6 and US 202 from the bridge to US 9 winds sharply around Anthony's Nose.

NY 132, a short local road that leads north to Route 6, begins at Old Yorktown Road. After the next major intersection at Granite Springs Road, the concurrency turns to an almost due south heading for two miles (3 km), then bends southeast into the junction with Saw Mill River Road, NY 118. Both routes turn north here, forming the third three-route overlap along US 202 in New York.

The north heading becomes northeast, then east into the town of Somers to where NY 35 leaves US 202 and NY 118 at the southwest end of Amawalk Reservoir, the first of several in the New York City water supply system along the road. US 202 and NY 118 turn left onto Tomahawk Street, closely hugging the reservoir's north shore, and then east shore after two miles (3 km), putting the road on a northern course. After crossing a small inlet at the reservoir's northwest corner, US 202 turns right, leaving NY 118. For the first time since Haverstraw, 38 miles (61 km) back, US 202 is alone, as it stays along the reservoir, heading northeast, then east, dipping south after the reservoir to pass north of Anglebrook Golf Club.

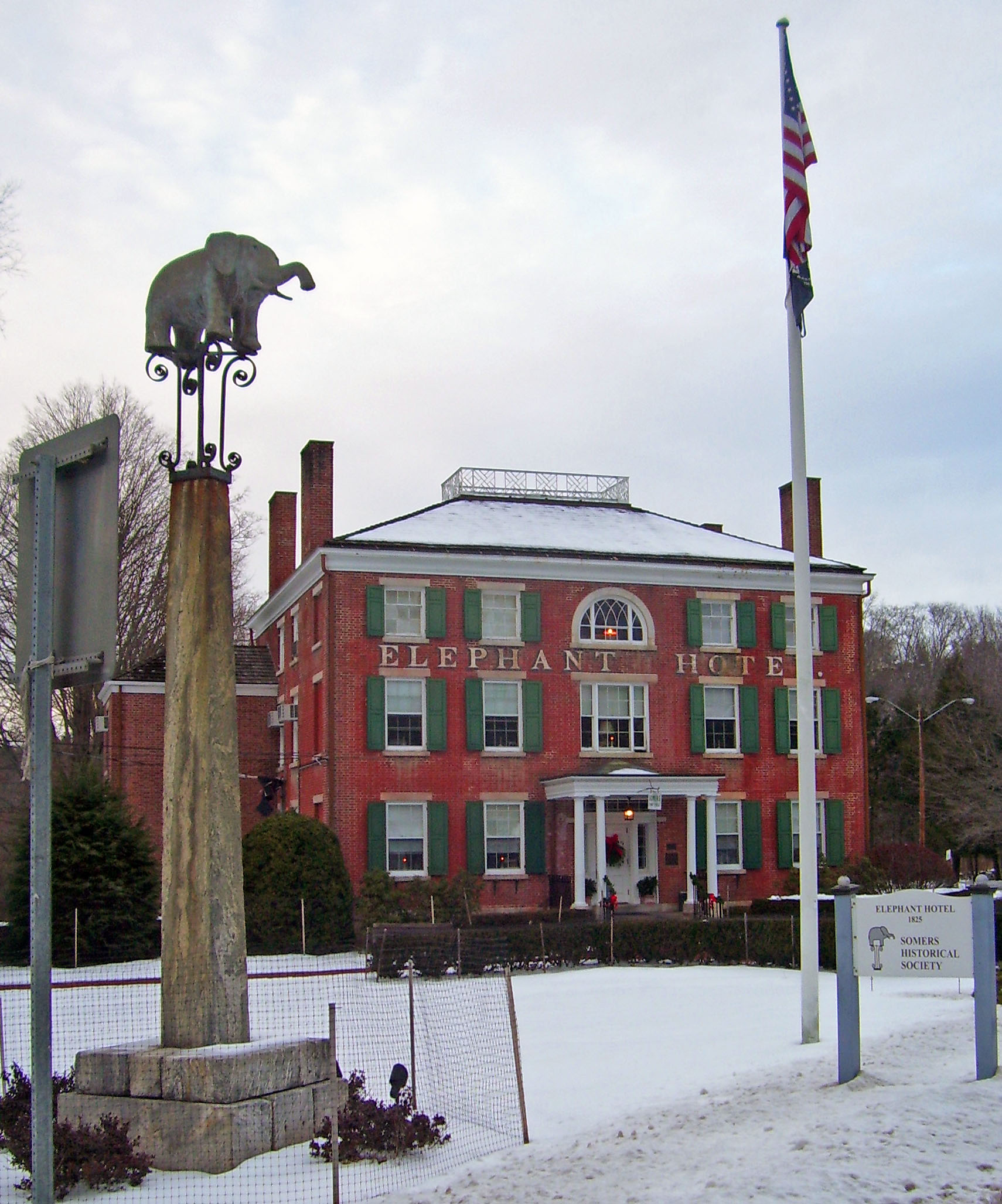
The Elephant Hotel, at the junction of US 202 and NY 100 in Somers

At the club's northeast corner, it turns left, as Primrose Street, the road ahead, continues as NY 139. After a mile, it turns right onto Mill Street, which becomes Somers Road shortly afterwards and curves to the south. At Brick Hill Road, it turns to a more northeast heading again, then east. This takes it into the center of town, where NY 100, Westchester's long north–south road, comes to its northern end just opposite the Elephant Hotel, Somers' town hall and a National Historic Landmark due to its role as the birthplace of the American circus.

Now called Somerstown Turnpike, the highway resumes a due-northeast heading to where NY 116 forks off to the east towards Titicus Reservoir. After this split, US 202 heads northeast through generally wooded areas almost two miles (3 km) to the Croton River, where it enters a new town, North Salem. Here it forms its first concurrency in seven miles (11 km), joining with NY 22, the long north–south route along New York's eastern boundary, just north of the hamlet of Croton Falls. After crossing under the Harlem Line of the Metro-North Railroad, the two roads enter Putnam County.

=== Putnam County ===
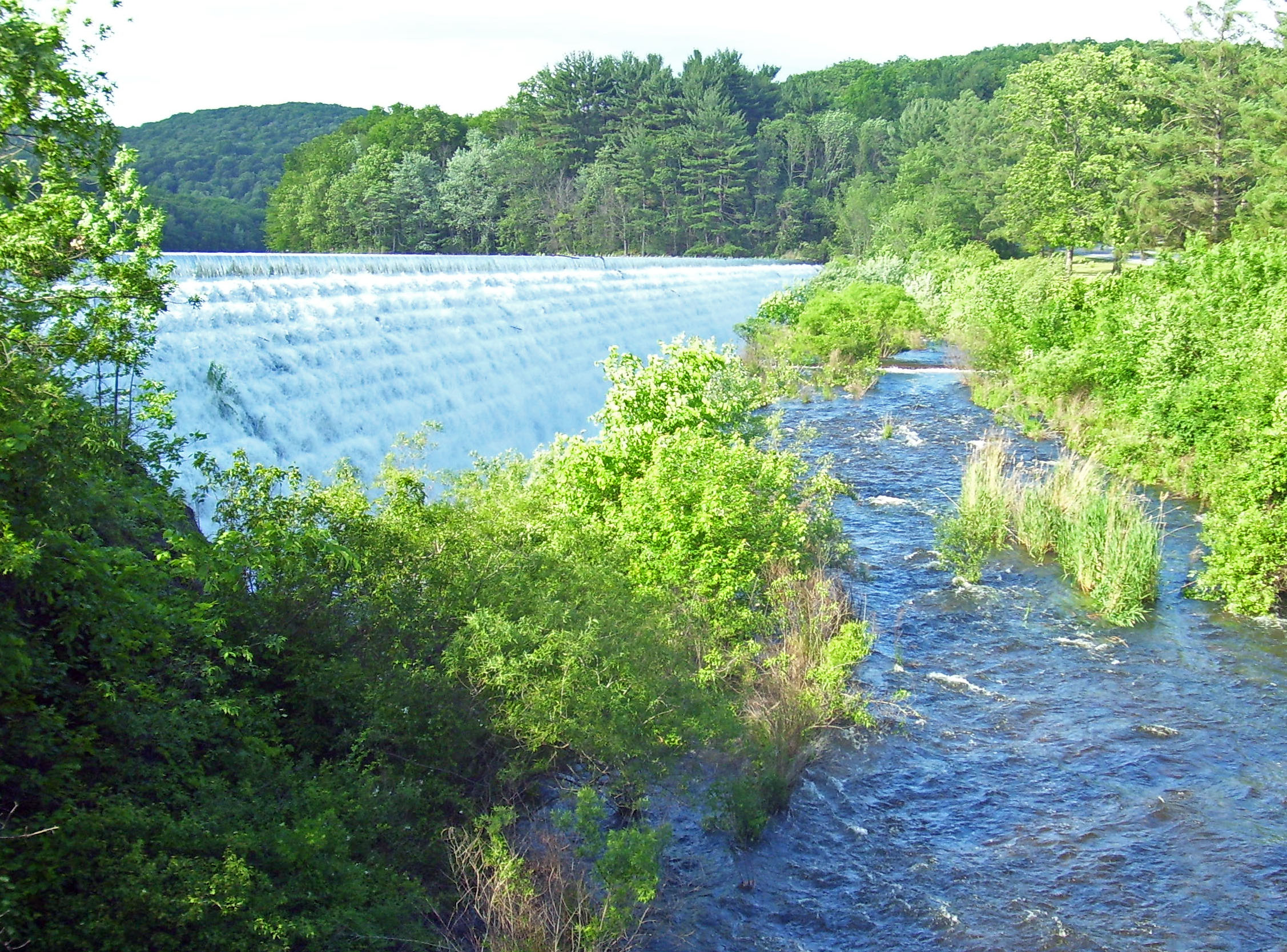
Spillway at East Branch Reservoir in Southeast

Routes 202 and 22 parallel the river and the railroad through similarly wooded country due northeast for the next two miles (3 km), with no intersections. The spillway of the lower section of East Branch Reservoir appears on the left, and then the road follows the reservoir in the same direction to the eastern outskirts of the village of Brewster. Here US 6 returns and gives US 202 its fourth three-way concurrency. Routes 6, 22 and 202 climb a small rise, cross under the Beacon Line and Maybrook Trailway and then pass through a developed area immediately south of the high quarter-mile bridge I-84 takes over the road and the river.

Just afterwards, the three routes turn right. The three-way overlap ends very soon afterwards at the next traffic light, where NY 22 turns left to pick up northbound traffic from I-684, which ends at the nearby junction with its parent route. The ramps to I-84 and I-684 also leave here.

The road ahead bends south and then east, as a four-lane arterial road making use of the thin land between I-84 and the northern section of East Branch. There is one flashing yellow light, at the northern terminus of NY 121, and then two miles (3 km) later, still next to the interstate, US 6 and US 202 cross into Danbury, Connecticut alongside it just before the Saw Mill Road exit.

== History ==
Prior to 1934, the portion of modern US 202 within New York was known by several different designations. When the first set of posted routes in New York were assigned in 1924, the segment of what is now US 202 from the New Jersey state line to Wayne Avenue in Suffern was designated as part of NY 17. At the same time, the part now concurrent with US 9W from Haverstraw to the Bear Mountain Bridge was included in NY 10 while the section between Croton Falls and Brewster became part of NY 22. By 1926, the Bear Mountain Bridge, the highway linking the bridge to Peekskill, and the piece of current US 202 east of Brewster were designated as part of NY 37. Although all of what became US 202 was state-maintained by this point, no other sections of the route were assigned a designation by 1926.

Three portions of the route changed designations following the creation of the U.S. Highway System. In 1927, all of NY 10 south of Albany was replaced by the newly assigned US 9W. NY 37, meanwhile, was replaced by a realigned US 6 one year later. In the late 1920s, the segment of modern US 202 from Suffern to Haverstraw was designated as NY 61. The last remaining unnumbered section—between Peekskill and Croton Falls—received a pair of designations as part of the 1930 renumbering of state highways in New York. From Peekskill to Somers, it became part of NY 116. At Somers, NY 116 continued east on its modern alignment toward Purdys while NY 118 followed modern US 202 northeast to Croton Falls.

NY 61 was supplanted c. 1934 by US 122, which was extended northward from Whitehouse, New Jersey, by way of modern County Route 523 and US 202. In Suffern, US 122 utilized a small part of NY 17, which was truncated to end at US 122 in the village center. US 122 was subsequently replaced by US 202, a new U.S. Route established by the American Association of State Highway Officials in June 1934 that extended from Bangor, Maine, to State Road, Delaware, south of Wilmington. In New York, US 202 continued north from Haverstraw to the Bear Mountain Bridge over US 9W and east to Connecticut by way of overlaps with US 6, NY 116, NY 118, and NY 22. The overlap with NY 116 was eliminated c. 1938 when NY 116 was truncated to its current western terminus in Somers.

While the portion of US 202 in New York has remained relatively unchanged since the route's assignment in 1934, the overlapping routes have changed over time. The alignments of NY 118 and NY 100 north of New Croton Reservoir were flipped c. 1939, placing NY 100 on the Croton Reservoir–Croton Falls highway. The resulting overlap between NY 100 and US 202 lasted as late as 1990; however, it was eliminated by 2004 when NY 100 was cut back to end at US 202 in Somers. In the early 1940s, the portion of US 202 between Peekskill and Amawalk became part of NY 35, an east–west route connecting Peekskill to Ridgefield, Connecticut.

== Major intersections ==
County	Location	mi	km	Destinations	Notes
Rockland	Suffern	0.00	0.00	US 202 south (Ramapo Valley Road) / CR 507 south (Franklin Turnpike) – Mahwah	Continuation into New Jersey
Rockland	Suffern	0.67	1.08	NY 59 east – Spring Valley	Western end of NY 59 concurrency
Rockland	Suffern	0.72	1.16	NY 59 west to I-87 / I-287 / New York Thruway / NY 17 – Sloatsburg	Eastern end of NY 59 concurrency
Rockland	Pomona	7.35	11.83	NY 306 south – Monsey	Northern terminus of NY 306
Rockland	Town of Haverstraw	9.06	14.58	NY 45 south / CR 47 north / Palisades Parkway – Spring Valley, New York City, Bear Mountain	Northern terminus of NY 45; southern terminus of CR 47; exit 13 on Palisades Parkway; hamlet of Mount Ivy
Rockland	Village of Haverstraw	12.35	19.88	US 9W south – Nyack, Tappan Zee Bridge	Western end of US 9W concurrency
Rockland	Stony Point	21.4	34.4	To Seven Lakes Drive south – Bear Mountain State Park	Access via South Entrance Road
Rockland	Stony Point	22.4	36.0	Seven Lakes Drive south – Bear Mountain State Park	Southbound exit and northbound entrance; northern terminus of Seven Lakes Drive
Orange	Bear Mountain State Park	22.75	36.61	US 6 west / Palisades Parkway south / US 9W north / US 6 Truck west – New York City, Harriman, Fort Montgomery, West Point	Bear Mountain Circle; eastern end of US 9W concurrency; western end of US 6 concurrency; northern terminus of Palisades Parkway; last eastbound exit before toll
Hudson River		23.16	37.27	Bear Mountain Bridge (eastbound toll; E-ZPass and Toll-by-Mail)	
Westchester	Cortlandt	23.40	37.66	NY 9D north / US 6 Alt. east / US 202 Alt. east – Cold Spring, Beacon	Southern terminus of NY 9D; western terminus of US 6 Alt./US 202 Alt.
Westchester	Cortlandt	26.97	43.40	US 9 north / US 6 Alt. west / US 202 Alt. west – Fishkill	Annsville Circle; western end of US 9 concurrency; eastern terminus of US 6 Alt./US 202 Alt.
Westchester	Peekskill	27.02	43.48	Bear Mountain State Parkway east to Taconic State Parkway – Yorktown	Western terminus of Bear Mountain Parkway
Westchester	Peekskill	27.02	43.48	Western end of freeway section	
Westchester	Peekskill	27.70	44.58	US 9 south – Tarrytown, Peekskill Station NY 35 begins	Eastern end of US 9 concurrency; western terminus of NY 35
Westchester	Peekskill	27.70	44.58	Eastern end of freeway section	
Westchester	Peekskill	28.55	45.95	US 6 east – Mahopac, Carmel	Eastern end of US 6 concurrency
Westchester	Cortlandt	31.21	50.23	Bear Mountain State Parkway west – Bear Mountain Bridge, Fishkill	Eastern terminus of Bear Mountain Parkway
Westchester	Yorktown	32.80	52.79	Bear Mountain State Parkway east to Taconic State Parkway south	Western terminus of Bear Mountain Parkway; no eastbound entrance; hamlet of Crompond
Westchester	Yorktown	33.83	54.44	Taconic State Parkway – New York City, Albany	Exit 17A on Taconic State Parkway
Westchester	Yorktown	34.53	55.57	NY 132 north – Shrub Oak	Southern terminus of NY 132; hamlet of Jefferson Valley
Westchester	Yorktown	36.56	58.84	NY 118 south – Croton Reservoir	Western end of NY 118 concurrency; former NY 100 south; hamlet of Yorktown Heights
Westchester	Somers	38.03	61.20	NY 35 east – Katonah, Cross River, Katonah Station	Eastern end of NY 35 concurrency
Westchester	Somers	40.85	65.74	NY 118 north – Mahopac	Eastern end of NY 118 concurrency; former NY 100 north
Westchester	Somers	42.71	68.74	NY 139 south – Millwood	Northern terminus of NY 139
Westchester	Somers	45.23	72.79	NY 100 south – Millwood	Northern terminus of NY 100; former NY 118
Westchester	Somers	45.54	73.29	NY 116 east – Purdys, Purdy's Station	Western terminus of NY 116
Westchester	Somers	47.11	75.82	To NY 22 south – Purdys, Croton Falls Station	Access via Croton Falls Road
Westchester	North Salem	47.28	76.09	NY 22 south – Purdys, Croton Falls Station	Western end of NY 22 concurrency
Putnam	Brewster	51.59	83.03	US 6 west – Carmel, Brewster Station	Western end of US 6 concurrency
Putnam	Southeast	52.53	84.54	I-84 / I-684 south / NY 22 north – Newburgh, Danbury, White Plains, Pawling	Interchange; eastern end of NY 22 concurrency; northern terminus and exit 10 on I-684
Putnam	Southeast	53.27	85.73	NY 121 south to I-84 east – North Salem	Northern terminus of NY 121
Putnam	Southeast	55.57	89.43	US 6 east / US 202 east – Danbury	Continuation into Connecticut
1.000 mi = 1.609 km; 1.000 km = 0.621 mi: Concurrency terminus; Electronic toll collection

== See also ==
U.S. Route 202
Previous state: New Jersey	New York	Next state: Connecticut
