= New York State Route 6 =

New York State Route 6 may refer to:

- New York State Route 6 (1924–1927) in the Hudson Valley and North Country
- U.S. Route 6 in New York, the only route numbered "6" in New York since 1926
