= Bear Mountain State Parkway =

Road in New York, United States

Bear Mountain State Parkway

- Bear Mountain State Parkway highlighted in red

Route information
- Maintained by NYSDOT
- Length: 6.20 mi (9.98 km) Includes connection made by US 202/NY 35
- Existed: 1932–present
- Restrictions: No commercial vehicles on eastern segment

Western segment
- Length: 3.85 mi (6.20 km)
- West end: US 6 / US 9 / US 202 in Peekskill
- Major intersections: US 6 in Cortlandt Manor
- East end: US 202 / NY 35 in Cortlandt

Eastern segment
- Length: 0.73 mi (1,170 m)
- West end: US 202 / NY 35 in Crompond
- East end: US 202 / NY 35 / Taconic State Parkway in Crompond

Location
- Country: United States
- State: New York
- Counties: Westchester

Highway system
- New York Highways; Interstate; US; State; Reference; Parkways

The Bear Mountain State Parkway (often referred to as the Bear Mountain Parkway) is a limited-access parkway located in northern Westchester County, New York, in the United States. It is an incomplete highway, with a 3.85-mile (6.20 km) western section and a 0.73-mile (1.17 km) eastern section; both sections comprise New York State Route 987H (NY 987H), the unsigned reference route assigned to the road by the New York State Department of Transportation (NYSDOT). Crompond Road (US 202/NY 35) provides a connection between the two sections. Collectively, the parkway extends from an intersection with US 6, US 9, and US 202 southeast of the Bear Mountain Bridge to an interchange with the Taconic State Parkway in Yorktown.

The parkway was built in 1932 but, unlike most other parkways in Westchester County, it has barely been constructed upon since. The initial reason for the Bear Mountain Parkway was to connect the Taconic State Parkway (or then, the Bronx River Parkway Extension) to the Bear Mountain Bridge. The Tappan Zee Bridge became a more popular Hudson River crossing following its construction, and consequently, the Bear Mountain Parkway was never finished.

== Route description ==
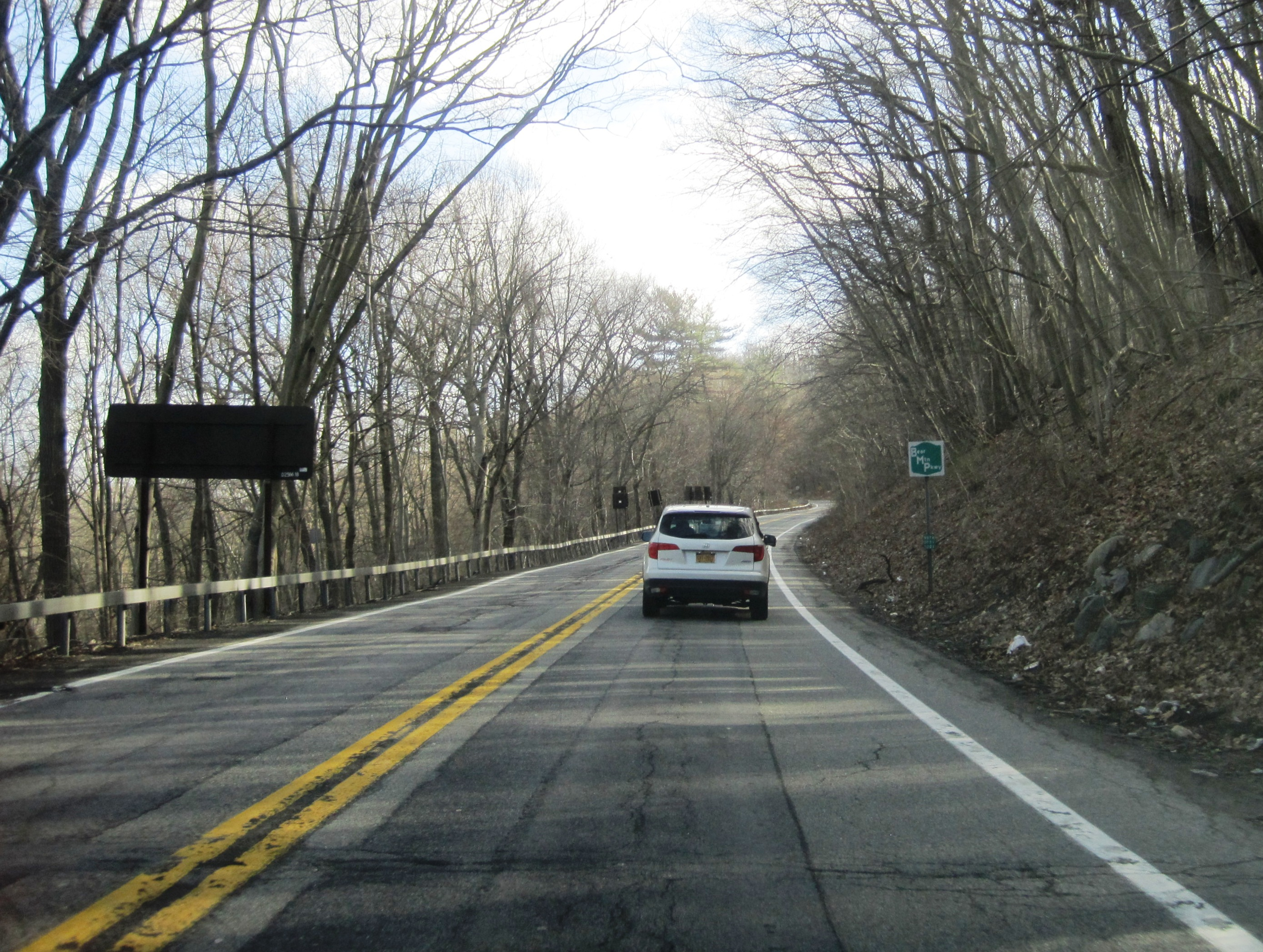
Eastbound Bear Mountain State Parkway past its western terminus in Peekskill

The parkway begins at an intersection with US 6, US 9 and US 202 south of Annsville Creek in Peekskill and proceeds eastward through the north side of Peekskill as a two-lane expressway. During its first mile, the parkway connects to Highland Avenue by way of an interchange before widening to three divided lanes (two eastbound, one westbound) at an interchange with North Division Street. The parkway intersects a street at-grade prior to entering Cortlandt. In Cortlandt, the parkway meets US 6 at an interchange and becomes a two-lane expressway again and meets several roads ahead of an intersection with US 202 and NY 35. Here, the Bear Mountain Parkway merges with the two-lane US 202 and NY 35, creating a physical but not official concurrency extending eastward into neighboring Yorktown. Roughly one mile from the town line, the parkway separates from US 202 and NY 35 and progresses to the northeast as a two-lane expressway. After a short distance, the parkway becomes separated by a median prior to merging with the southbound Taconic State Parkway. The northbound Taconic Parkway is accessed by way of US 202 and NY 35.

NY 987H, the internal NYSDOT designation for the parkway, terminates at both ends of the physical overlap with US 202 and NY 35 and applies only to the segments of the road separate from US 202 and NY 35. The parkway was designated but not signed as NY 821 prior to the creation of the current reference route system.

== History ==
Originally proposed by Robert Moses, the Bear Mountain State Parkway was built between 1929 and 1932 by the Westchester County Parks Commission as part of the Bronx River Parkway's extension into northern Westchester County. It was intended to provide a quick, scenic trip from the Bronx to the Bear Mountain Bridge and Harriman State Park. In 1941, the Taconic State Park Commission assumed control of the Bronx River extension. The commission subsequently combined the north–south portion of the extension with the then-Eastern State Parkway to create the Taconic State Parkway. The east–west section of the extension between the Taconic Parkway and Annsville was renamed the Bear Mountain State Parkway.

At the time of the parkway's construction, the Bear Mountain Bridge was an extremely important crossing of the Hudson River for Westchester, Rockland, Putnam, and Orange County residents. The construction of the Tappan Zee Bridge and the traffic issues caused by the two-lane roads descending to the Bear Mountain Bridge have diminished the bridge's popularity since then, and consequently, the Bear Mountain Parkway was never finished.

In 2000, there was an initiative to complete the final missing piece of the Bear Mountain Parkway, since all of the right of way has already been acquired. However, this never came to fruition.

== Exit list ==
The entire route is in Westchester County. All exits are unnumbered.

Location	mi	km	Destinations	Notes
Peekskill	0.00	0.00	US 6 / US 9 / US 202 – Croton-on-Hudson, Bear Mountain, Fishkill, Camp Smith	Western terminus; at-grade intersection
Peekskill	0.80	1.29	Highland Avenue	No westbound entrance
Peekskill	1.10	1.77	North Division Street	
Cortlandt	2.94	4.73	US 6 – Peekskill, Lake Mohegan, Brewster	
Cortlandt	3.85	6.20	US 202 / NY 35 – Yorktown Heights, Peekskill	Eastern terminus; at-grade intersection
Gap in route
Crompond	0.00	0.00	US 202 west / NY 35 west – Peekskill	Western terminus; at-grade intersection
Crompond	0.16	0.26	Stony Street to US 202 east / NY 35 east – Yorktown Heights	At-grade intersection; US 202/NY 35 not signed eastbound
Crompond	0.73	1.17	US 202 / NY 35 / Taconic State Parkway south – New York City, Yorktown Heights	Eastern terminus; exit 17B on Taconic State Parkway
1.000 mi = 1.609 km; 1.000 km = 0.621 mi: Incomplete access
