= New York State Route 35 =

State highway in Westchester New York, US

New York State Route 35
- Map of Westchester County in southeastern New York with NY 35 highlighted in red

Route information
- Maintained by NYSDOT, Westchester County and the city of Peekskill
- Length: 24.63 mi (39.64 km)
- Existed: early 1940s–present

Major junctions
- West end: US 6 / US 9 / US 202 in Peekskill
- Bear Mountain State Parkway in Cortlandt and Crompond; Taconic State Parkway in Crompond; US 202 / NY 118 in Somers; NY 100 in Somers; I-684 in Bedford; NY 22 in Bedford
- East end: Route 35 at the Connecticut state line near South Salem

Location
- Country: United States
- State: New York
- Counties: Westchester

Highway system
- New York Highways; Interstate; US; State; Reference; Parkways
← NY 35	→ NY 36

New York State Route 35 (NY 35) is the principal east–west highway in the northern part of Westchester County, New York, carrying average daily volumes of around 16,500 vehicles. Its western terminus is at US 9 in Peekskill, while its eastern terminus is at the Connecticut state line in Lewisboro, where it becomes that state's Route 35.

== Route description ==
=== Peekskill to Yorktown ===
NY 35 begins at an interchange with US 6, US 9 and US 202 (Croton Expressway) in the city of Peekskill. NY 35, US 6 and US 202 are concurrent upon leaving the interchange on Main Street. Bending eastward through Peekskill, the routes cross over US 9 as a two-lane commercial street through the city. Entering the center of Peekskill, NY 35, US 6 and US 202 bend eastward as a two-lane city street, passing through a dense neighborhood of commercial businesses and apartment buildings, crossing through the Artist District and soon into the downtown portion. Crossing an intersection with North Division Street (unsigned County Route 63 (CR 63)), the routes continue eastward along Main Street to an intersection with Broad Street. At that junction, US 6 continues east along Main Street while NY 35 and US 202 bend southward along South Broad Street.

NY 35 and US 202 continue south through Peekskill, becoming a two-lane commercial/residential street, soon crossing an intersection with Crompond Road (unsigned CR 24). At this junction, NY 35 and US 202 turn east on Crompond, remaining county maintained as part of CR 24, becoming a two-lane residential street for several blocks. NY 35, US 202 and CR 24 continue eastward for several blocks, winding through the city of Peekskill for several miles. Paralleling US 6 to the north, the routes pass south of Beecher Park and enter a large residential complex. Near Dayton Road, the routes bend southeast, passing Hudson Valley Hospital Center, leaving the city of Peekskill and entering the town of Cortlandt. At this crossing, the CR 24 designation terminates.

NY 35 and US 202 continue eastward through the town of Cortlandt, entering the hamlet of Toddville, which consist of several residences. The routes, still named Crompond Road, makes a gradual bend to the east, remaining a two-lane residential street for a distance. After Locust Avenue, the route becomes commercial to the southern side, soon winding northeast into an intersection with the eastern terminus of the western segment of the Bear Mountain State Parkway. At this intersection, NY 35 and US 202 continues east along Crompond as a two-lane commercial street. Crossing into the town of Yorktown, bending southeast as Crompond, soon bending to the northeast. A short distance from the bend, NY 35 and US 202 intersect with the western terminus of the eastern segment of the Bear Mountain State Parkway, which connects to the Taconic State Parkway.

Continuing east from the Bear Mountain State Parkway, NY 35 and US 202 continue east, becoming a four-lane surface road through a commercial stretch of Yorktown. The routes soon become surrounded by dense forest, entering a diamond interchange with the Taconic State Parkway. After crossing under the parkway, NY 35 and US 202 runs along the northern boulevard of Franklin Roosevelt Park as a two-lane residential street. After passing a church and cemetery on the northern side of the roadway, NY 35 and US 202 intersect with the southern terminus of NY 132 (Old Yorktown Road). After NY 132, the routes continue east along Crompond, bending southeast at Springhurst Road. After crossing under power lines, Crompond Road continues southeast, bending south through Yorktown.

=== Yorktown to Ridgefield ===
NY 35 and US 202 continue south through Yorktown, bending southeast, becoming a two-lane residential/commercial street. Entering downtown Yorktown, NY 35 and US 202 intersect with NY 118 (Saw Mill River Road). At this intersection, NY 35 and US 202 become concurrent with NY 118 along Saw Mill River, leaving Crompond behind. NY 35, US 202 and NY 118 proceed northward along Saw Mill River Road, proceeding north as a two-lane commercial street. At Ridge Street, the routes turn northeast, turning east through Yorktown. The three routes remain concurrent for several miles, crossing out of Yorktown for the town of Somers. A short distance after the crossing, the routes split, with NY 118 and US 202 proceeding north on Tomahawk Street while NY 35 continues east on Amawalk Road.

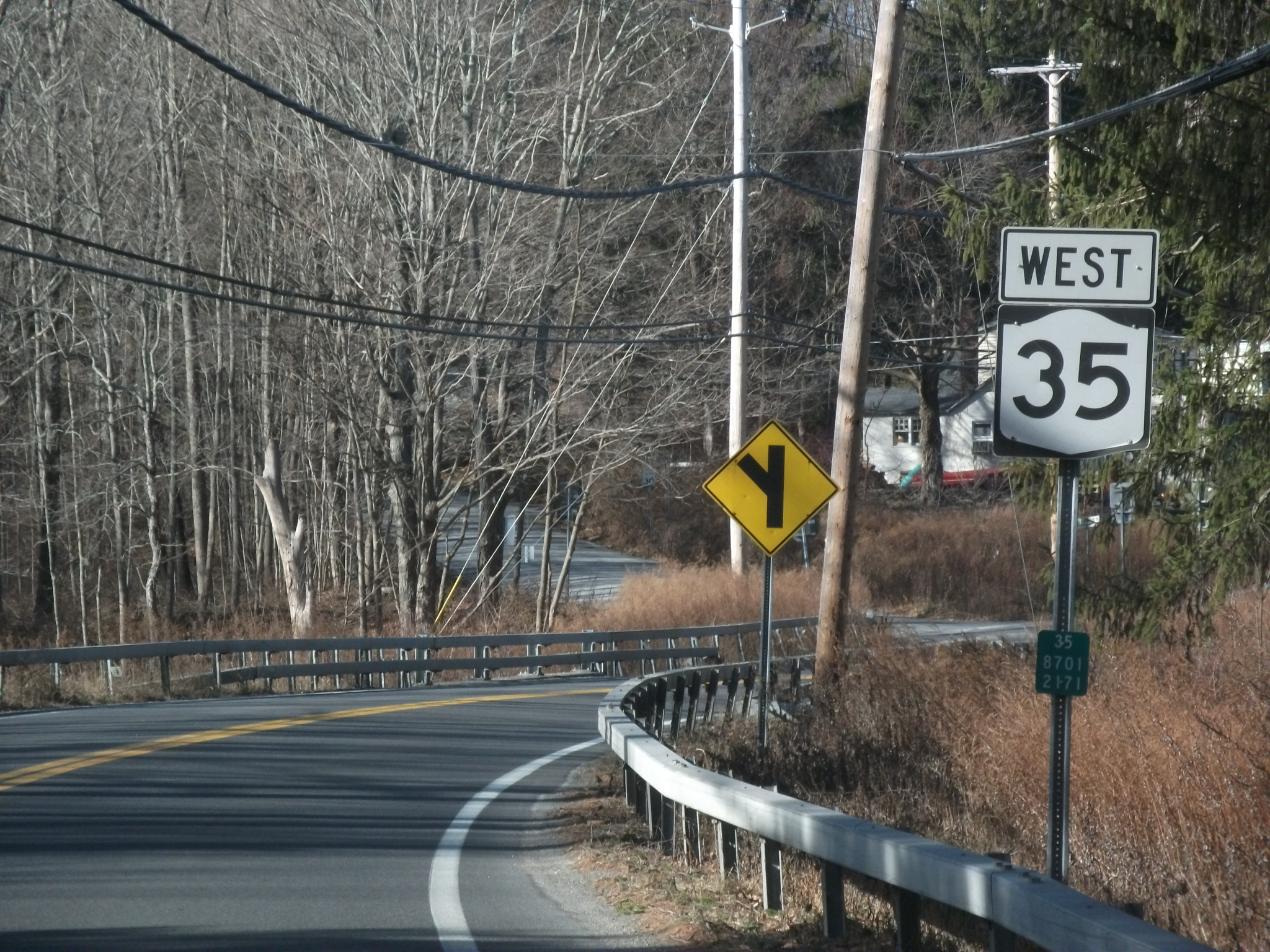
NY 35 west through the town of Bedford

At this point, NY 35 begins running south of the Amawalk Reservoir, winding eastward past several residences, and the dam of the Muscoot River. At Lake Road, NY 35 bends southeast through Somers, winding through dense forests, passing east of the Mildred Lasdon Sanctuary. Making a curve to the northeast, the route passes west of Larson Park Arboretum, running along the northern end of it. Winding eastward for several miles, the route becomes residential, bending southeast at Van Rensselaer Road. This southwestern progression goes for a distance, winding into the hamlet of Whitehall Corners. In Whitehall Corners, NY 35 intersects with NY 100 (Somerstown Turnpike) and becomes a four-lane undivided expressway. At this intersection, the Amawalk Road moniker changes to Woods Bridge Road.

Now running north of the New Croton Reservoir, NY 35 continues eastward along Woods Bridge Road, soon crossing over. Upon crossing the New Croton, the route enters the town of Lewisboro. Still named Woods Bridge Road, NY 35 becomes a four-lane divided expressway running along the southern side of the New Croton Reservoir. A short distance after, the route crosses into the hamlet of Katonah, located within the town of Bedford. In Katonah, NY 35 proceeds southeast, where the route changes names to Cross River Road as Woods Bridge forks off. After that, NY 35 enters exit 6 of I-684. After I-684, NY 35 continues east along Cross River Road, crossing north of a small New Croton branch. As the branch disintegrates, the route enters an intersection with NY 22 (Goldens Bridge Road).

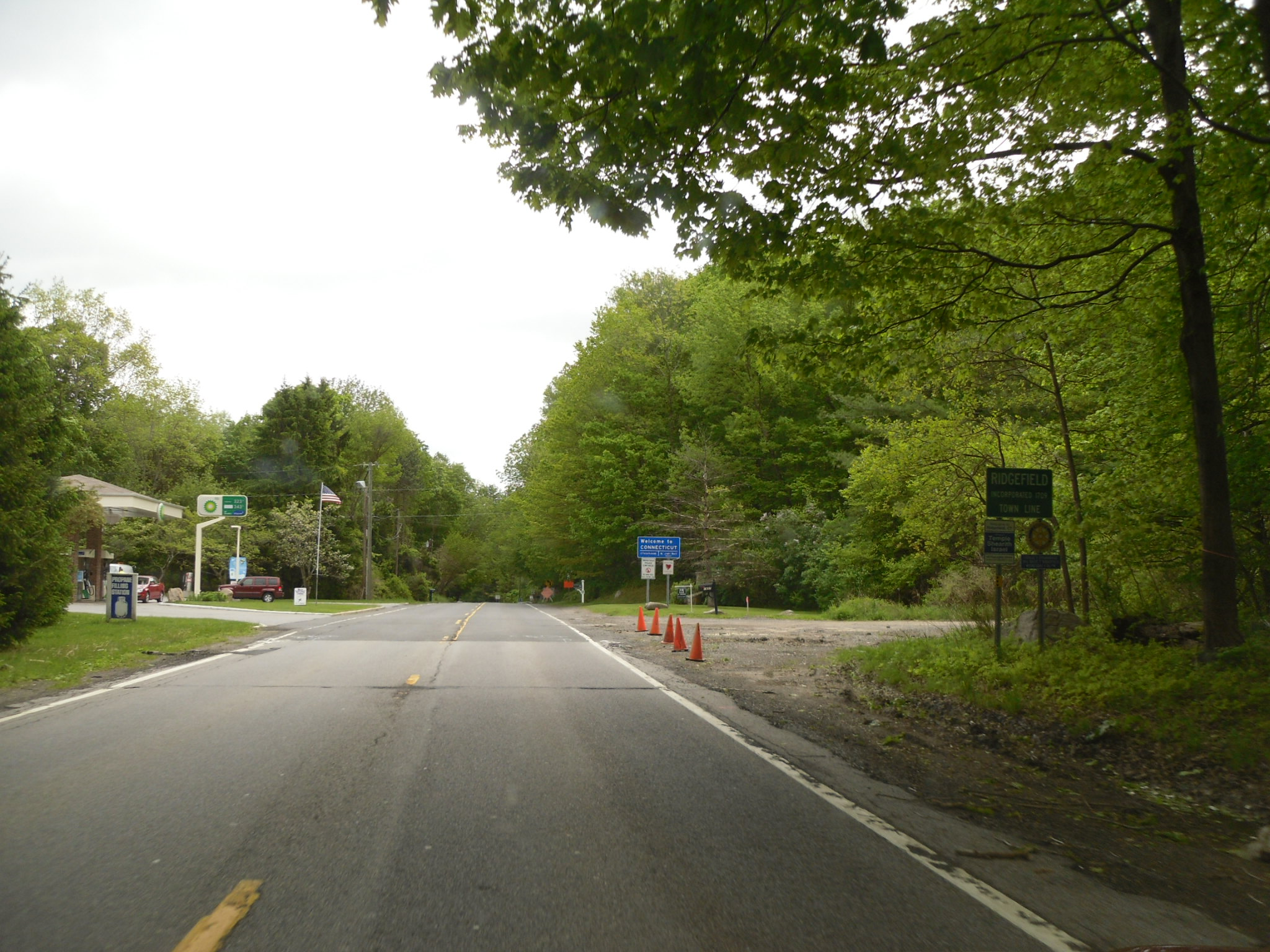
NY 35 eastbound approaching the Connecticut state line in Lewisboro

After NY 22, NY 35 becomes a two-lane residential street in Bedford, continuing east along Cross River Road, entering the Cross River Reservoir. Running along the northern shore of the Cross River Reservoir, NY 35 continues east through Bedford. A short distance later, the route crosses back into Lewisboro, making a bend southeastward on Cross River Road. A short distance to the east, NY 35 intersects with NY 121 (Old Post Road). The two routes become concurrent, entering a rich neighborhood. After winding northeast, NY 121 forks north at an intersection with North Salem Road. NY 35 meanwhile continues east on Cross River Road, as a two-lane commercial street for a short distance. Near Mark Mead Road, NY 35 crosses into a residential street.

NY 35 bends northeast again through Lewisboro, making a gradual curve near Mead Street. The route becomes a two-lane residential street, running along the northern border of Lewisboro Town Park. After several more winds, the route intersects with the northern terminus of NY 124 (Spring Street South) and a fork from the mainline NY 124 a short distance later. After the forked portion, NY 35 bends southeast through Lewisboro, entering the large residential hamlet of South Salem. The route winds eastward for a distance, intersecting with the northern terminus of NY 123 (Smith Ridge Road). Just east of NY 123, NY 35 continues as Cross River Road until reaching the Connecticut state line. At this junction, NY 35 becomes Connecticut Route 35 (South Salem Road), running east through Ridgefield.

== History ==
The portion of modern NY 35 between Peekskill and Croton Avenue east of the city was originally designated as part of Route 2, an unsigned legislative route, by the New York State Legislature in 1908. The route was realigned on March 1, 1921, to enter Peekskill on modern U.S. Route 9 (US 9) instead. In the 1930 renumbering of state highways in New York, various sections of what is now NY 35 were assigned state route designations. From Peekskill to Amawalk, it became part of NY 116, which continued north from Amawalk on NY 100 (now NY 118). The portion from Yorktown to NY 22 in Katonah via Bedford Road and Jay Street in Katonah was an extension of NY 132. Lastly, the segment between NY 121 in Cross River and Smith Ridge Road east of South Salem was designated as part of NY 123.

In 1934, US 202 was created and routed along NY 116 from Peekskill to Somers. Farther east, NY 123 was extended westward along current NY 35 to NY 22 northeast of Katonah c. 1940. In the early 1940s, modern NY 35 in Westchester County was established, extending across Upper Westchester County on parts of NY 116, NY 132, and NY 123. All three routes were truncated to their current termini at this time. The western terminus of NY 35 was set at US 9 in Peekskill, creating a long overlap with US 202 that still exists today. The number 35 was chosen to match the existing route number in Connecticut. In the 1950s, several plans to build a freeway along the NY 35 corridor were studied, but none of these plans were built. NY 35 was moved onto its current alignment north of Katonah in the mid-1970s.

== Major intersections ==
The entire route is in Westchester County.

Location	mi	km	Destinations	Notes
Peekskill	0.00	0.00	US 6 west / US 9 / US 202 west (Croton Expressway)	Western terminus; western end of US 6/US 202 concurrency
Peekskill	0.81	1.30	US 6 east (Main Street) – Carmel	Eastern end of US 6 concurrency
Town of Cortlandt	3.47	5.58	Bear Mountain State Parkway west – Bear Mountain, Fishkill	Eastern terminus of Bear Mountain Parkway
Town of Yorktown	5.37	8.64	Bear Mountain State Parkway east to Taconic State Parkway south	Western terminus of Bear Mountain Parkway; no eastbound entrance; hamlet of Crompond
Town of Yorktown	6.13	9.87	Taconic State Parkway – New York, Albany	Exit 17A on Taconic State Parkway
Town of Yorktown	6.83	10.99	NY 132 north – Shrub Oak	Southern terminus of NY 132; hamlet of Yorktown
Town of Yorktown	8.86	14.26	NY 118 south	Western end of NY 118 concurrency; former NY 100 south; hamlet of Yorktown Heights
Town of Somers	10.33	16.62	US 202 east / NY 118 north – Baldwin Place, Somers	Eastern end of US 202/NY 118 concurrency; former NY 100 north; hamlet of Amawalk
Town of Somers	13.77	22.16	NY 100 – Somers, Millwood	Hamlet of Whitehall Corners; former NY 118
Town of Somers	13.77	22.16	Western end of limited-access section	
Town of Bedford	15.14	24.37	Woods Bridge Road – Katonah	At-grade intersection; former NY 117
Town of Bedford	15.34	24.69	I-684 to Saw Mill River Parkway south / NY 117 south – White Plains, Brewster	Exit 6 on I-684
Town of Bedford	15.74	25.33	NY 22 – Goldens Bridge, Bedford, Caramoor Center	At-grade intersection
Town of Bedford			Eastern end of limited-access section	
Town of Lewisboro	19.18	30.87	NY 121 south – Bedford	Western end of NY 121 concurrency; hamlet of Cross River
Town of Lewisboro	19.84	31.93	NY 121 north – Goldens Bridge	Eastern end of NY 121 concurrency
Town of Lewisboro	21.86	35.18	NY 124 south – Pound Ridge	Northern terminus of NY 124; hamlet of South Salem
Town of Lewisboro	22.45	36.13	To NY 124 south – Pound Ridge	Access via NY 983D
Town of Lewisboro	24.42	39.30	NY 123 south – Vista	Northern terminus of NY 123
Town of Lewisboro	24.63	39.64	Route 35 east – Ridgefield	Continuation into Connecticut
1.000 mi = 1.609 km; 1.000 km = 0.621 mi: Concurrency terminus

== See also ==
- List of county routes in Westchester County, New York
