= New York State Route 132 =

State highway in Westchester County, New York, US

New York State Route 132
- Map of Putnam and Westchester counties with NY 132 highlighted in red

Route information
- Maintained by NYSDOT
- Length: 2.75 mi (4.43 km)
- Existed: 1930–present

Major junctions
- South end: US 202 / NY 35 in Jefferson Valley
- Taconic State Parkway in Shrub Oak
- North end: US 6 in Shrub Oak

Location
- Country: United States
- State: New York
- Counties: Westchester

Highway system
- New York Highways; Interstate; US; State; Reference; Parkways
← NY 131	→ NY 133

New York State Route 132 (NY 132) is a 2.75-mile (4.43 km) state highway located entirely within the town of Yorktown in Westchester County, New York, in the United States. The route acts as a connector between the concurrency of U.S. Route 202 (US 202) and NY 35 in the south and US 6 in the hamlet of Shrub Oak in the north. When the route was assigned as part of the 1930 renumbering of state highways in New York, it continued southeast to the hamlet of Katonah. It was cut back to its current southern terminus in the early 1940s and extended one block northward to its present length between 1968 and 1973.

== Route description ==
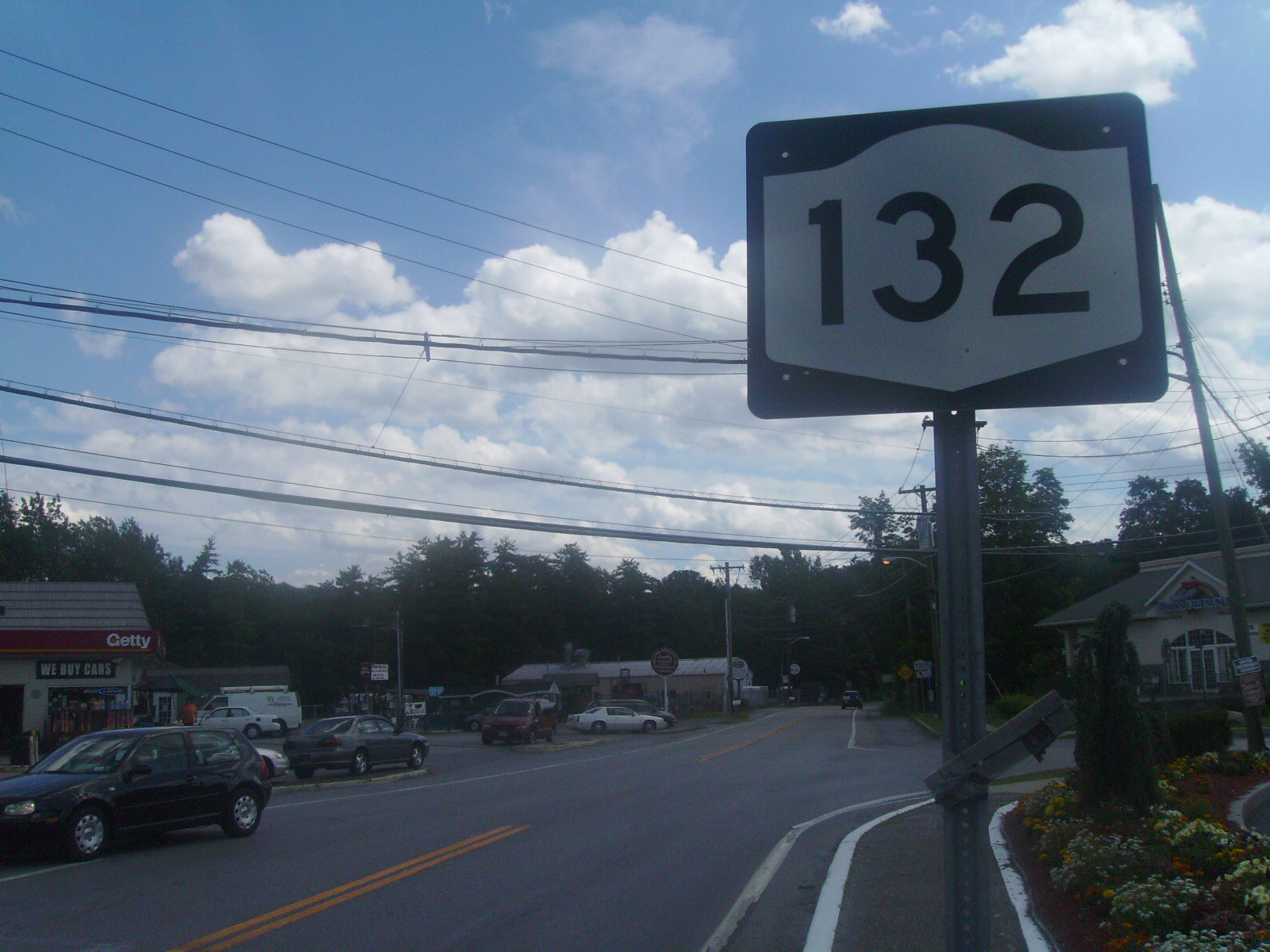
NY 132 heading southbound from US 6 in Yorktown

NY 132 begins at an intersection with the concurrency of US 202 and NY 35 in front of Franklin D. Roosevelt State Park in the town of Yorktown. NY 132 proceeds north along Old Yorktown Road, crossing through a residential section of Yorktown. After passing a junction with Meadowcrest Drive, the route takes a turn to the northwest then returns to its northerly progression near Strang Boulevard. Remaining a two-lane residential street through Yorktown, NY 132 passes Lakeland Copper Beech Middle School and turns northwest once again towards more homes and into a partial diamond interchange with the Taconic State Parkway. At this interchange, there is no access from NY 132 to the northbound Taconic, and no access from the southbound Taconic to NY 132.

A short distance northwest of the interchange, NY 132 reaches a junction with the eastern end of East Main Street (unsigned CR 1309). Two blocks north of East Main Street, NY 132 enters a junction with US 6 in the hamlet of Shrub Oak. This junction marks the northern terminus of NY 132, whose right-of-way continues north through Yorktown as Barger Street, connecting to the Putnam County line.

== History ==
The north–south highway connecting Crompond Road to the hamlet of Shrub Oak was acquired by the state of New York in the mid-1920s. It did not have a posted route number until the 1930 renumbering of state highways in New York when it became part of NY 132, a new route extending from US 6 in Shrub Oak to NY 22 near the hamlet of Katonah. The highway went southeast from Shrub Oak to Yorktown Heights on Crompond Street and Crompond Road, from where it traveled generally eastward to Katonah on Hallocks Mill, Saw Mill River, Amawalk, and Woods Bridge roads. In Katonah, NY 132 used Woods Bridge Road, Bedford Road, and Jay Street to connect to NY 22.

As originally assigned, NY 132 bypassed the center of Yorktown Heights to the north. This was changed by 1932 as NY 132 was realigned to directly serve the hamlet by way of Crompond and Saw Mill River roads. In the early 1940s, all of NY 132 east of Yorktown became part of NY 35, a new cross-county route extending from Peekskill to the Connecticut state line. As a result, NY 132 was truncated to its junction with NY 35 and US 202 in the hamlet of Yorktown. NY 132's northern terminus was moved a short distance northward between 1968 and 1973 as a result of the re-alignment of US 6 through Yorktown. Prior to being called Old Yorktown Road, most of NY 132 was named Crompond Street.

== NY 132A ==
New York State Route 132A
- Location: Yorktown
- Existed: 1930–mid-1970s

NY 132A was a suffixed route of NY 132 in the town of Yorktown. When it was initially assigned as part of the 1930 renumbering of state highways in New York, NY 132A was an alternate route of NY 132 along Mohansic Avenue and Baldwin Road, providing access from NY 132 to Mohansic State Park. NY 132 was truncated to Yorktown in the early 1940s, separating it from NY 132A; however, NY 132A was not renumbered or otherwise altered. The route remained in existence until the mid-1970s, at which time maintenance of Mohansic Avenue and Baldwin Road was transferred to the town of Yorktown.

== Major intersections ==
The entire route is in Yorktown, Westchester County.

mi	km	Destinations	Notes
0.00	0.00	US 202 / NY 35 – Yorktown Heights, Peekskill	Southern terminus
2.49	4.01	Taconic State Parkway south	Exit 19 on Taconic State Parkway
2.75	4.43	US 6 to Taconic State Parkway – Lake Mohegan, Mahopac	Northern terminus; hamlet of Shrub Oak
1.000 mi = 1.609 km; 1.000 km = 0.621 mi
