= Greenville, Orange County, New York =

Greenville, New York
- Town
- Town of Greenville
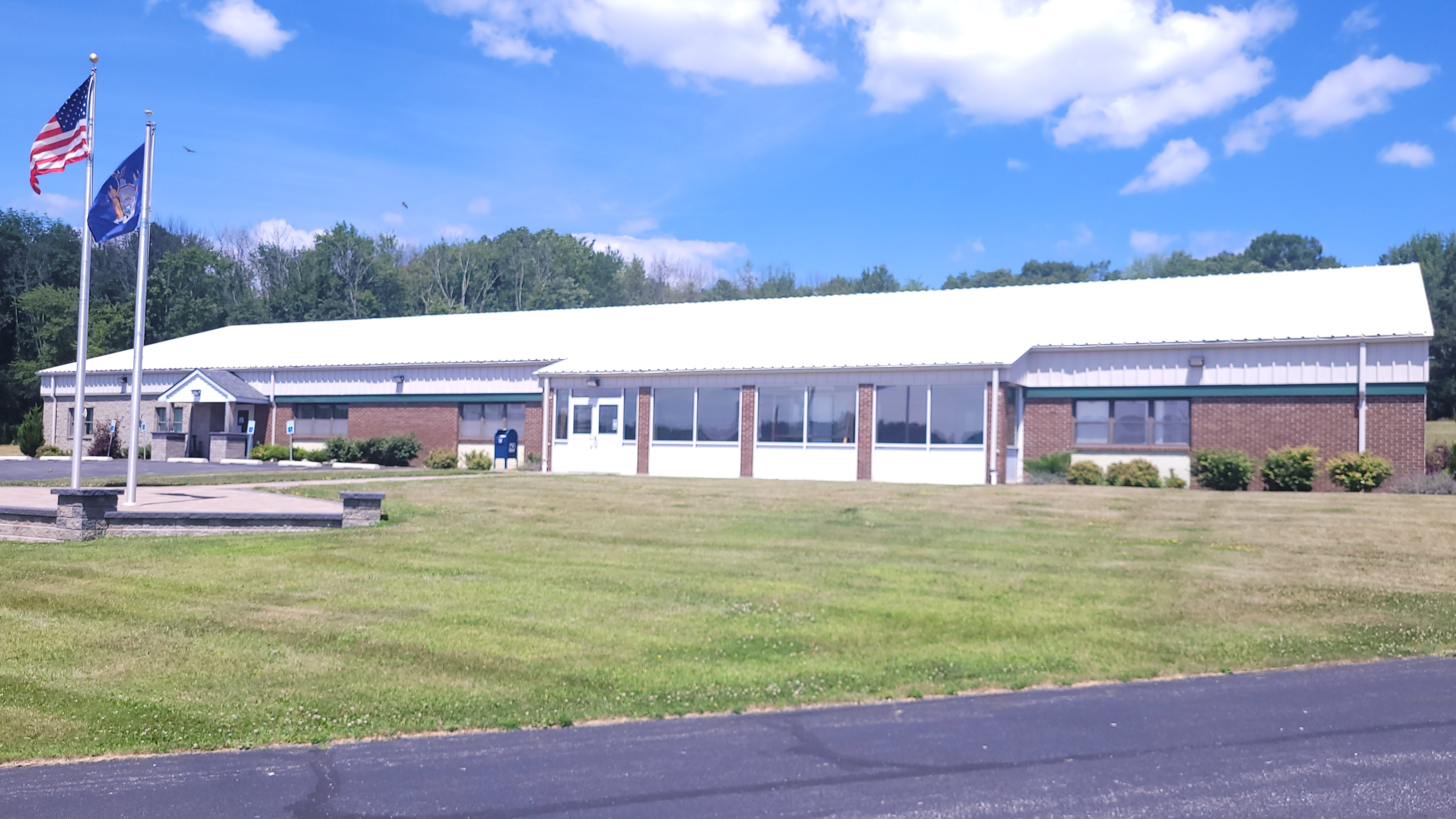
- Town hall

- Location in Orange County and the state of New York.

- Location within the state of New York
- Coordinates: 41°22′N 74°35′W
- Country: United States
- State: New York
- County: Orange

Government
  - Type: Town Council
  - Town Supervisor: George J. Hossann, Jr. (R)
  - Town Council: Members' List: • Maureen T. Entwistle (R); • Arthur J. Schleich (R); • Jason R. Soudant (R); • Geoffrey R. Stafford (R)

Area
  - Total: 30.5 sq mi (79.1 km^{2})
  - Land: 30.3 sq mi (78.4 km^{2})
  - Water: 0.27 sq mi (0.7 km^{2})
- Elevation: 981 ft (299 m)

Population (2020)
  - Total: 4,689
  - Density: 155/sq mi (59.8/km^{2})
- Time zone: UTC-5 (EST)
  - Summer (DST): UTC-4 (EDT)
- ZIP Code: 10940, 12771
- Area code: 845
- FIPS code: 36-30631
- GNIS feature ID: 0979023
- Website: www.greenvilleny.org

Greenville is a town in Orange County, New York, United States. It is located along the southern county and state line, with a population of 4,689 at the 2020 census.

Greenville has neither cities nor villages, and most of the communities are small clusters of houses. (Residents of the town get their mail through the Port Jervis or Middletown post office.) Greenville is near Exit 4 off Interstate 84, which features the town's firehouse and a few other businesses.

== History ==
The oldest settlement in Greenville is Smiths Corners, named after Elijah Smith and founded at the end of the Revolutionary War. Settlement first began in 1750. Construction began in 1754, then ceased when money from the Crown was revoked. Building did not resume until the late 1790s. The town of Greenville was separated from Minisink in 1853.

== Geography ==
According to the United States Census Bureau, the town has a total area of 30.5 square miles (79 km^{2}), of which 30.3 square miles (78 km^{2}) is land and 0.3 square miles (0.78 km^{2}), or 0.85%, is water.

US 6, the Grand Army of the Republic Highway, is an important east–west highway. Interstate 84 parallels US 6 across the town.

The southern town line is the state line of New Jersey.

== Demographics ==
Historical population
Census	Pop.	Note	%±
1860	1,198		—
1870	1,123		−6.3%
1880	1,002		−10.8%
1890	862		−14.0%
1900	800		−7.2%
1910	644		−19.5%
1920	618		−4.0%
1930	674		9.1%
1940	732		8.6%
1950	737		0.7%
1960	890		20.8%
1970	1,379		54.9%
1980	2,085		51.2%
1990	3,120		49.6%
2000	3,800		21.8%
2010	4,616		21.5%
2020	4,689		1.6%
U.S. Decennial Census

As of the census of 2000, there were 3,800 people, 1,243 households, and 1,024 families residing in the town. The population density was 125.6 inhabitants per square mile (48.5/km^{2}). There were 1,365 housing units at an average density of 45.1 per square mile (17.4/km^{2}). The racial makeup of the town was 95.13% white, 1.26% African American, 0.29% Native American, 1.05% Asian, 0.03% Pacific Islander, 1.13% from other races, and 1.11% from two or more races. Hispanic or Latino of any race were 4.47% of the population.

There were 1,243 households, out of which 44.8% had children under the age of 18 living with them, 71.2% were married couples living together, 7.7% had a female householder with no husband present, and 17.6% were non-families. 14.1% of all households were made up of individuals, and 4.9% had someone living alone who was 65 years of age or older. The average household size was 3.04 and the average family size was 3.34.

In the town, the population was spread out, with 30.3% under the age of 18, 6.4% from 18 to 24, 30.2% from 25 to 44, 24.4% from 45 to 64, and 8.6% who were 65 years of age or older. The median age was 36 years. For every 100 females, there were 97.0 males. For every 100 females age 18 and over, there were 94.5 males.

The median income for a household in the town was $60,260, and the median income for a family was $65,257. Males had a median income of $45,847 versus $28,672 for females. The per capita income for the town was $23,090. About 3.8% of families and 4.3% of the population were below the poverty line, including 4.6% of those under age 18 and 6.1% of those age 65 or over.

== Communities and locations in Greenville ==
- Bushville – a hamlet on US-6, east of Greenville village.
- Greenville (formerly "Minisink") – a hamlet located south of Smiths Corners and the US-6 and Interstate 84 junction.
- Lake Hathorne – a small lake north of Smiths Corners.
- Logtown – a hamlet southeast of the eponymous hamlet.
- Smiths Corners – a hamlet near the intersection of Interstate 84 and US-6.

== Notable person ==
- Christian Eckes, race car driver
