= Pauling =

Pauling is a surname. People, places, and organizations with it include:

- Linus Pauling
  - Paulingite
  - Pauling's rules
  - 4674 Pauling
  - Linus Pauling Institute
  - Linus Pauling Library
  - Linus Pauling Award
  - Pauling Field
- Ava Helen Pauling, wife of Linus
- Ben Pauling, British racehorse trainer
- Lowman Pauling
- Tom Pauling (barrister)
- Will Pauling (born 2003), American football player

== See also ==
- Paulingite
- Pawling (disambiguation)
