= Bear Mountain Bridge Road =

- U.S. National Register of Historic Places
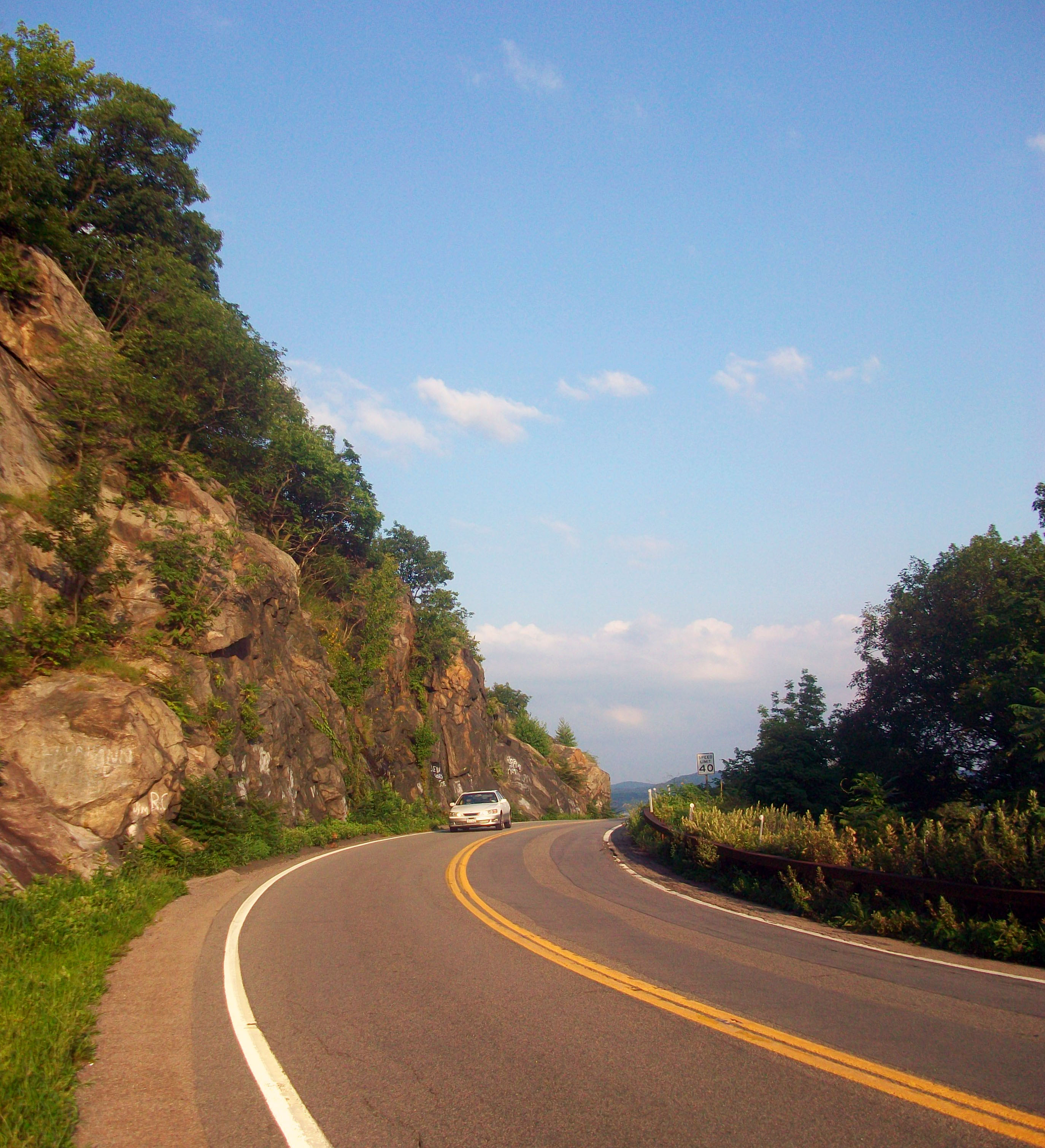
- Road on Anthony's Nose, 2009
- Bear Mountain Bridge Road highlighted in red
- Location: Cortlandt, NY
- Coordinates: 41°18′42″N 73°58′14″W
- Area: 3 miles (4.8 km); 18 acres (7.3 ha)
- Built: 1923
- Architectural style: Tudorbethan
- MPS: Hudson Highlands MRA
- NRHP reference No.: 82001274
- Added to NRHP: November 23, 1982

Bear Mountain Bridge Road is a three-mile (4.8 km), two-lane section of US 6/US 202 from the west approach to Bear Mountain Bridge to a former toll house in the Town of Cortlandt, New York, United States. Local residents sometimes refer to the road as the Goat Trail. It winds around the steep, rocky slopes of Anthony's Nose, the southernmost peak of the Hudson Highlands on the east side of the Hudson River. In its first mile from the junction with NY 9D it climbs 200 feet (61 m) to a scenic overlook that looks out over Iona Island, Dunderberg Mountain, the city of Peekskill and the Charles Point power plant. There are interpretive displays on the history of the area during the Revolutionary War, where the Hudson River Chain was deployed and the Battle of Forts Clinton and Montgomery was fought.

Near its eastern end, approximately 2.5 miles (4.0 km) from the bridge, is a Tudor Revival-style former toll house. It also served as the toll taker's residence. In 2002 it was renovated by the Town of Cortlandt and now serves as an information center and gift shop for visitors to the region. A small parking lot serves hikers taking a popular trail along Anthony's Nose, through lands in the Camp Smith New York Army National Guard base just above the highway, to the Appalachian Trail just north of the bridge.

At its eastern end, before intersecting with US 9 at the Annsville Circle, the road falls to the level of the Hudson River, which it parallels. There, near the entrance to Camp Smith, looking south across a bay and the Metro-North railroad, can be seen the Indian Point nuclear power plant.

The state required the Harriman family to build the road when the bridge was built in the mid-1920s, in order to connect the bridge with US 9 just north of Peekskill. It was intended to be higher on the mountainside than the similar Storm King Highway, which had been built upriver a decade earlier. Like that road, it has a stone wall, made from the 21,000 cubic yards (16,000 m^{3}) of material excavated during the highway's construction.

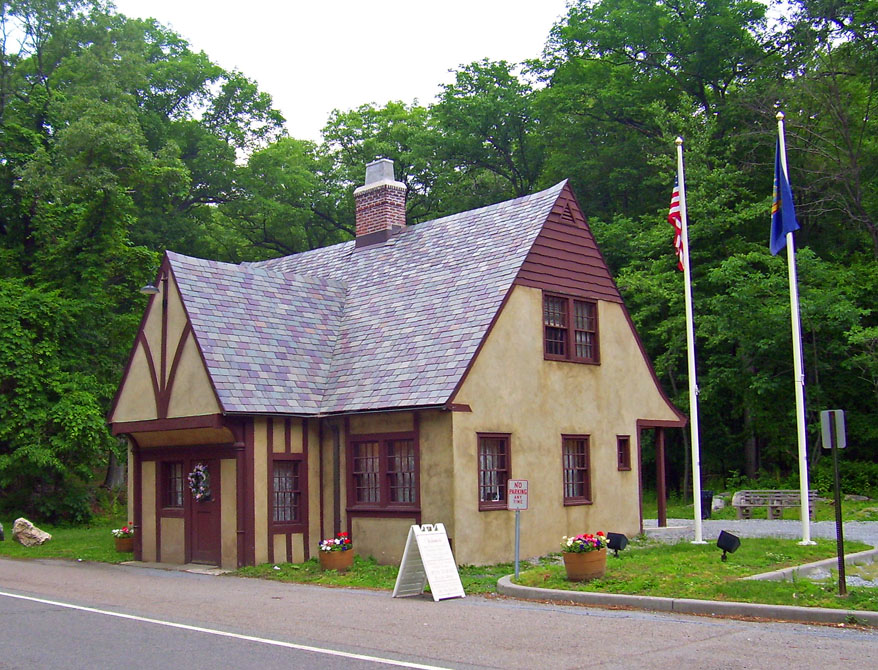
Original toll house, no longer in use

The legislation that allowed the bridge's construction stipulated that the road and bridge would revert to the state at no cost after 30 years. When that happened, the toll collected on the eastern end was eliminated, and the toll collector and his wife moved to the western toll house, where he served as bridge manager, until he retired. The road and toll house were listed together on the National Register of Historic Places in 1982 as part of the Hudson Highlands Multiple Resource Area multiple property submission, the only property in Westchester County included in that group.

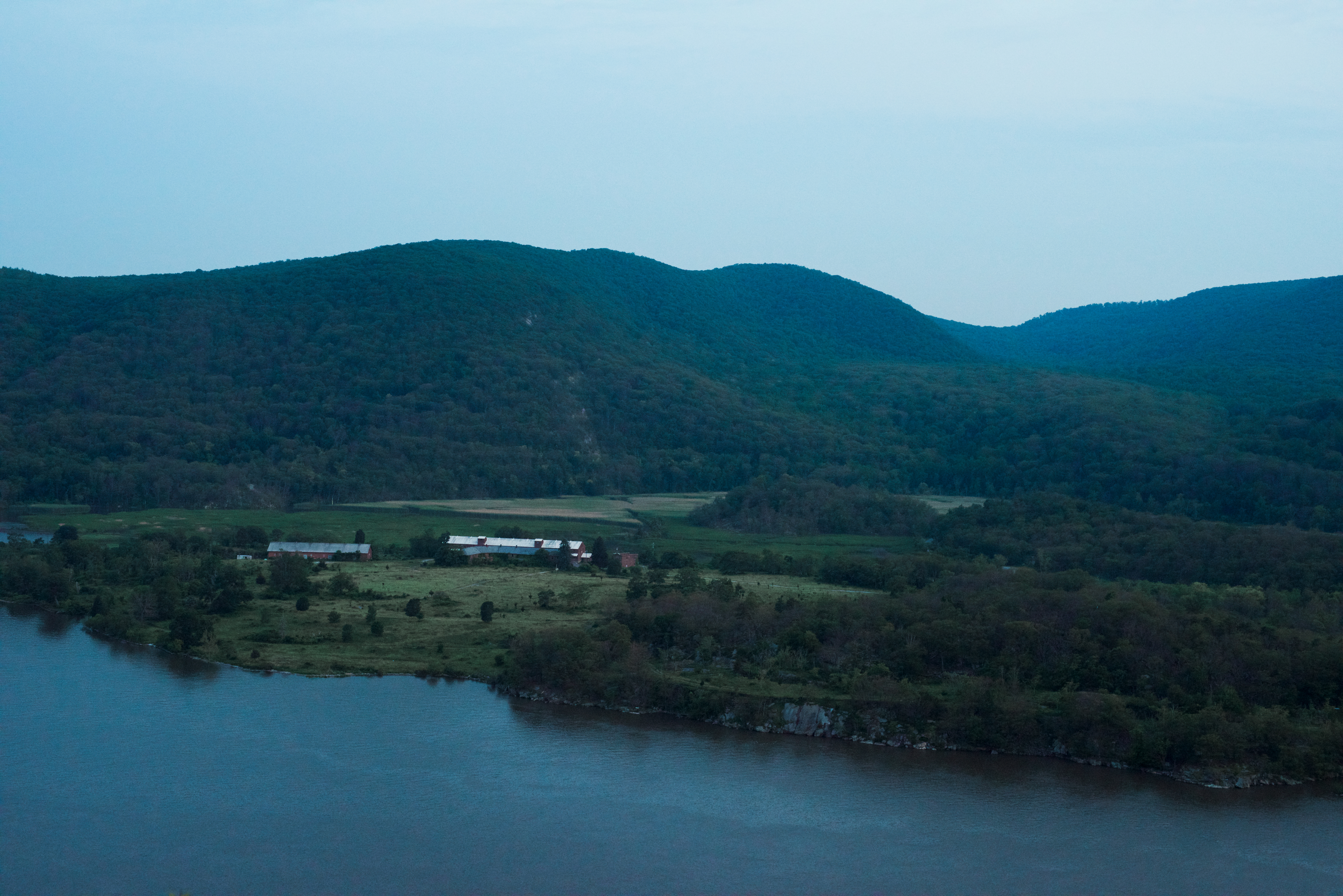
View of the Hudson River from near Bear Mountain Bridge Road scenic overlook

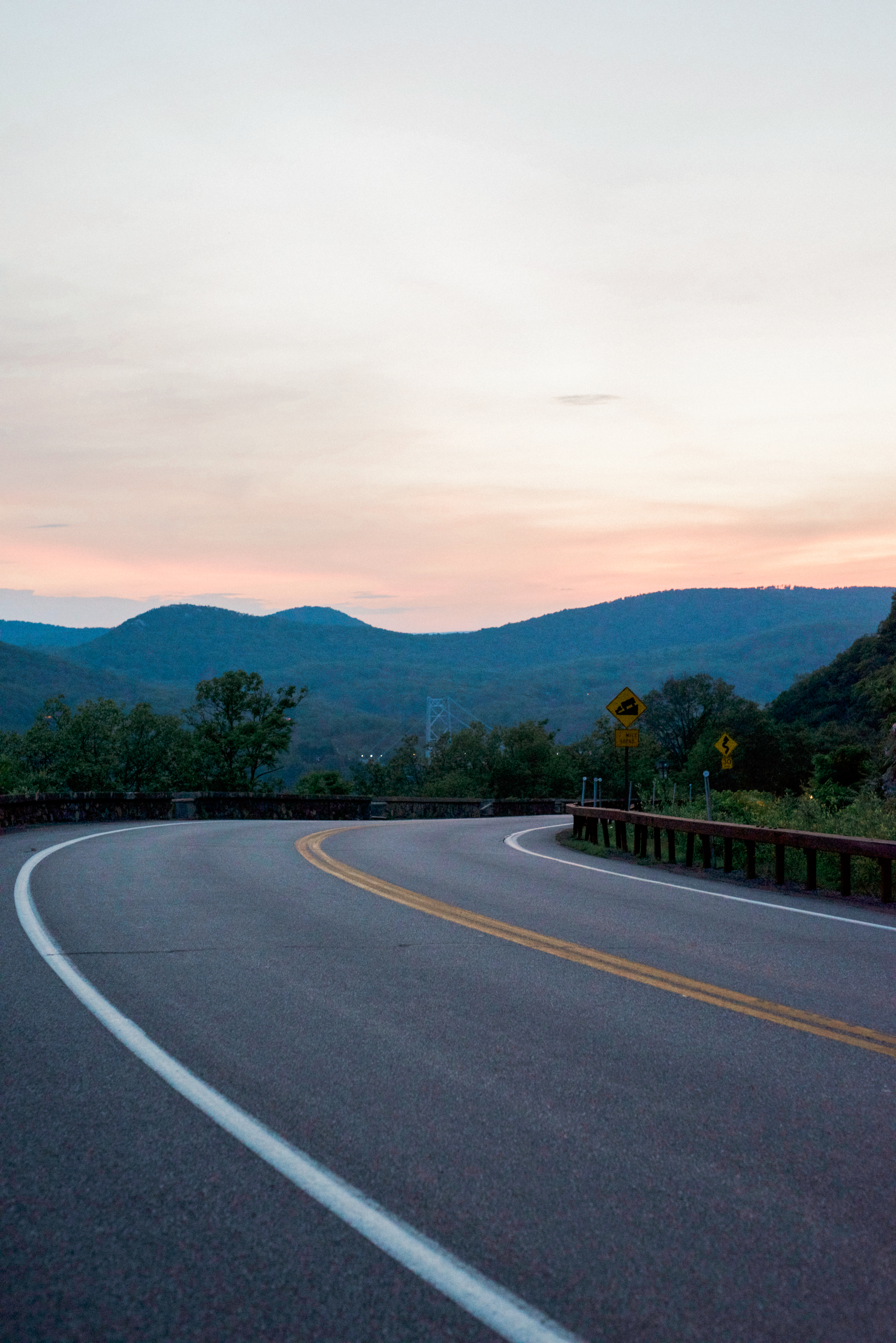
Bear Mountain Bridge Road at twilight

== See also ==
- National Register of Historic Places listings in northern Westchester County, New York
