= Pawling =

Pawling may refer to:

- Pawling (town), New York, in Dutchess County
  - Pawling (village), New York, in the town of Pawling
    - Pawling (Metro-North station), train station for the village
  - Pawling Nature Reserve, in the northern section of the town of Pawling
- Pawling Hall, a historic meeting hall in Hagaman, Montgomery County, New York, United States
- Pawling & Harnischfeger, a United States mining-equipment manufacturer in Wisconsin, 1880s–1930s

== See also ==
- Pauling (surname)
