= U.S. Route 6 in New York =

Section of U.S. Route in New York state

U.S. Route 6
- Grand Army of the Republic Highway
- US 6 highlighted in red, with NY 6N and US 6 Alt. highlighted in blue

Route information
- Maintained by NYSDOT, Westchester County, the city of Port Jervis, Joint Interstate Bridge Commission, NYSDEC, and NYSBA
- Length: 77.85 mi (125.29 km)
- Existed: 1927–present
- Restrictions: No commercial vehicles on Long Mountain & Palisades Parkways

Major junctions
- West end: US 6 / US 209 at the Pennsylvania state line in Port Jervis
- I-84 / Route 23 in Port Jervis; Future I-86 / NY 17 / NY 17M in Goshen; Future I-86 / I-87 / New York Thruway / NY 17 / NY 32 in Harriman; Palisades Parkway / Seven Lakes Drive in Harriman State Park; US 9W / US 202 in Bear Mountain State Park; US 9 in Cortlandt; Bear Mountain State Parkway in Peekskill; US 9 / US 202 in Peekskill; Taconic State Parkway in Shrub Oak; I-84 / I-684 / NY 22 in Southeast
- East end: US 6 / US 202 at the Connecticut state line in Southeast

Location
- Country: United States
- State: New York
- Counties: Orange, Westchester, Putnam

Highway system
- United States Numbered Highway System; List; Special; Divided; New York Highways; Interstate; US; State; Reference; Parkways
← NY 5S	→ NY 6A
← NY 6B	NY 6N	→ NY 7

U.S. Route 6 (US 6) in New York is a 77.85-mile (125.29 km) stretch of United States Numbered Highway that spans from the Pennsylvania state line at Port Jervis to the Connecticut state line east of Brewster. Near both ends it runs in close proximity to Interstate 84 (I-84), which otherwise takes a more northerly route through Downstate New York. US 6, meanwhile, skirts the northern fringe of the New York metropolitan area.

US 6 is a two-lane road in New York for the most part. Two stretches are shared with US 202. It goes through three of New York's traffic circles, more than any other highway in the state, and is part of the only concurrency of three U.S. routes in the state.

US 6 is not as important a transportation artery in New York as it is in some other states. The route does, however, pass through some of the region's more memorable scenery, particularly the Hudson Highlands in the form of Harriman and Bear Mountain state parks. It crosses the Hudson River at the historic Bear Mountain Bridge. Other highlights include the Shawangunk Ridge in the west and New York City's reservoirs in the east.

== Route description ==
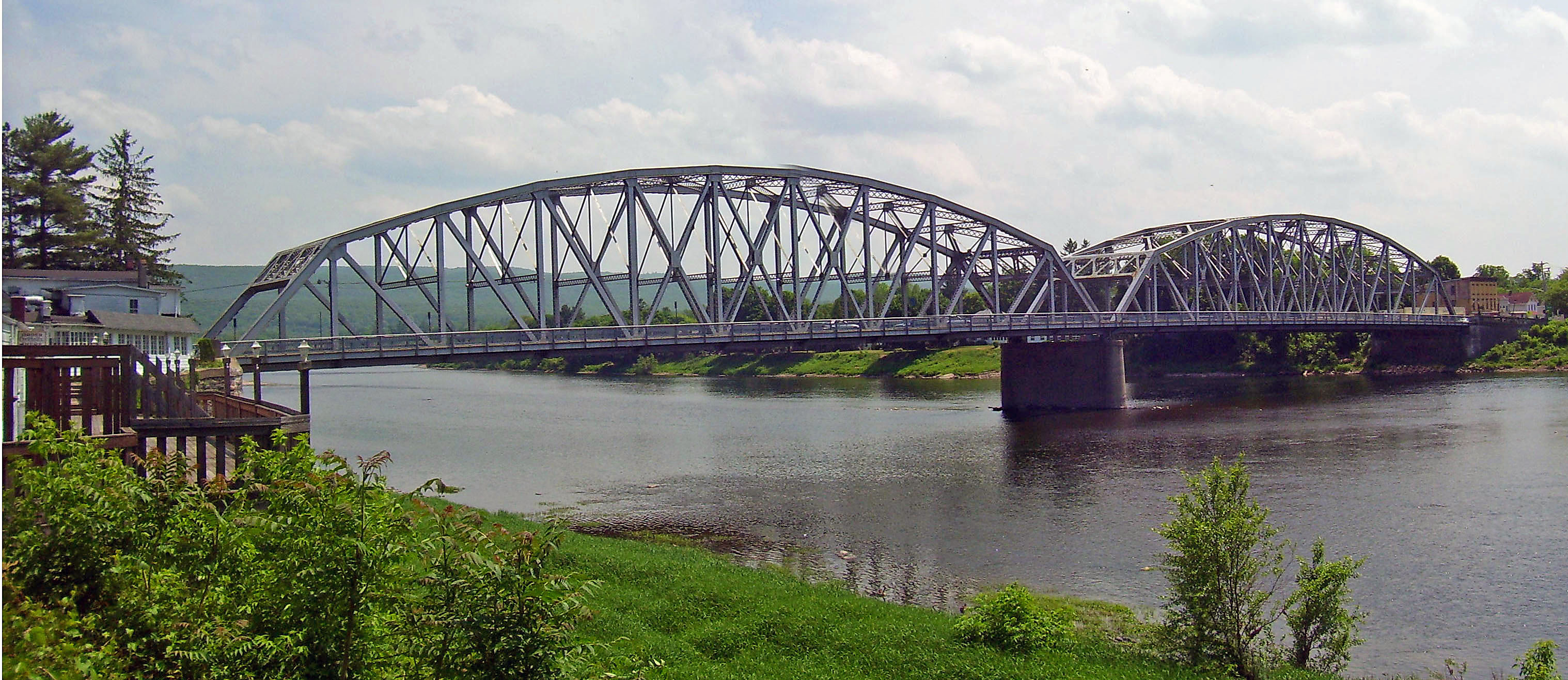
The Mid-Delaware Bridge

The Hudson River roughly bisects New York's section of US 6, although more of it is on the river's western side. Despite its many curves and turns, the road stays in a generally east–west direction.

=== West of Harriman ===
US 6 crosses the Delaware River into New York concurrent with US 209 from Matamoras via the Mid-Delaware Bridge. Upon entering Port Jervis, they become Pike Street. Two blocks from the bridge, the highways cross under the wide grassy strip that once carried the Erie Railroad's Main Line and pass the city's Metro-North station, the most remote from New York on the extensive commuter rail network. A few blocks further north, at the Park Avenue traffic light, NY 42 and NY 97 begin to the left while US 6 and US 209 turn right, now West Main Street.

Two blocks later, the highways having not even come a mile from the state line, US 209 splits to the left at Kingston Avenue. US 6 continues to follow West Main past Port Jervis Middle School and Bon Secours Hospital, veering south to cross under the railroad tracks and then over the Neversink River. At a three-way junction with short County Route 15 (CR 15), US 6 reaches the Port Jervis city limit. Signs point to Route 23, which begins a few hundred feet to the south, just past the I-84 overpass.

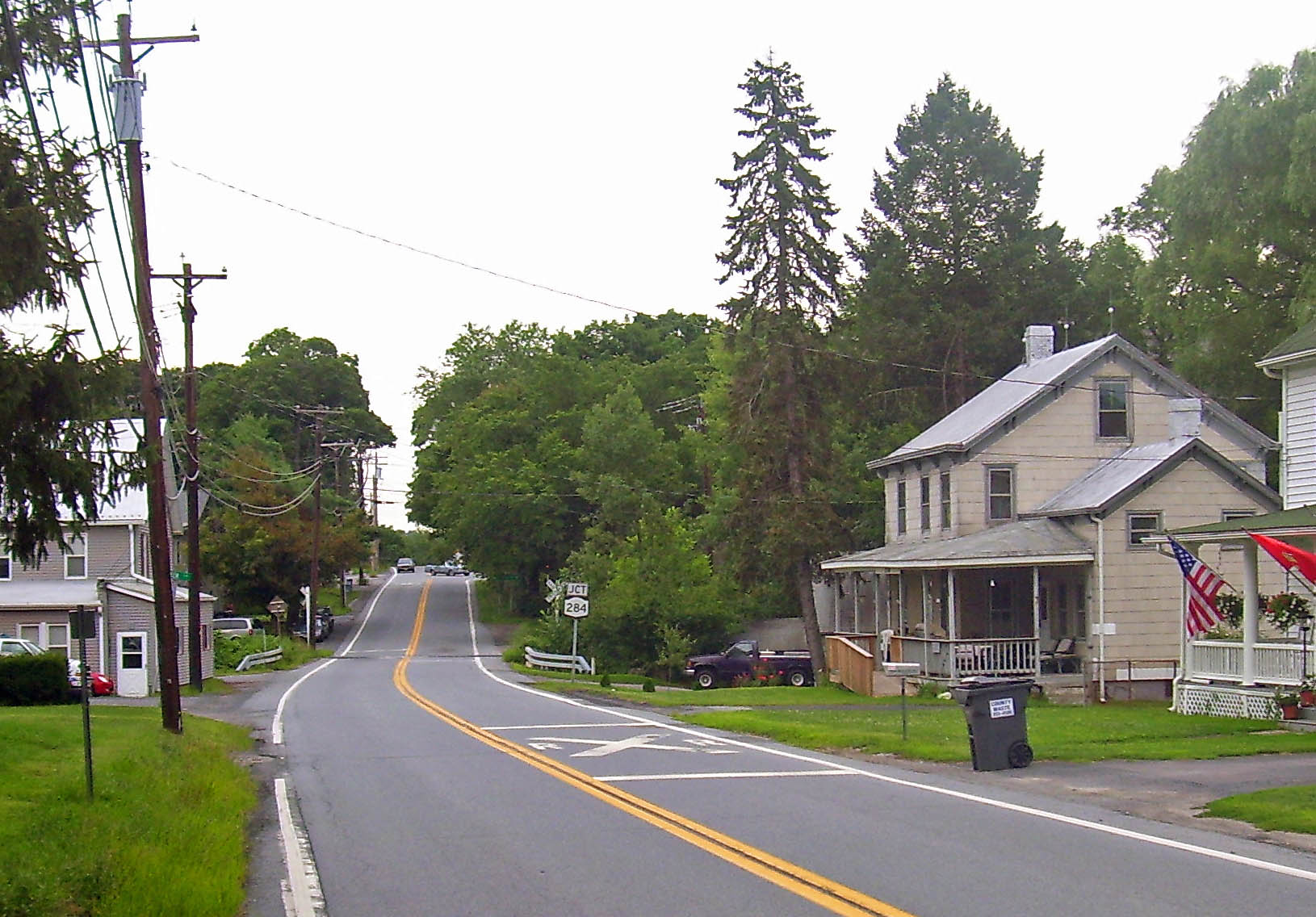
Slate Hill

From here traffic on US 6 grows lighter as it parallels I-84 for the next 17 miles (27 km). Trucks going through this stretch are limited to 10 short tons (9.1 t; 8.9 long tons). It slowly traverses up the Shawangunk Ridge alongside the Interstate Highway and then down again. Just before exit 4, it crosses under I-84 again. After putting at least a mile (1.6 km) between the two, US 6 starts to run a long straight course, as Grand Army of the Republic Highway, through the wetlands of Greenville, then through gently rolling hills taking it to South Centreville, where Minisink Valley High School and the district's other schools are concentrated. At the hamlet of Slate Hill, NY 284, another route down to New Jersey, comes in from the south.

US 6 continues through very rural countryside through here. Shortly before Middletown, it crosses over I-84 and turns right onto NY 17M, crossing over the Interstate Highway yet again. This is US 6's last crossing of I-84 west of the Hudson River.

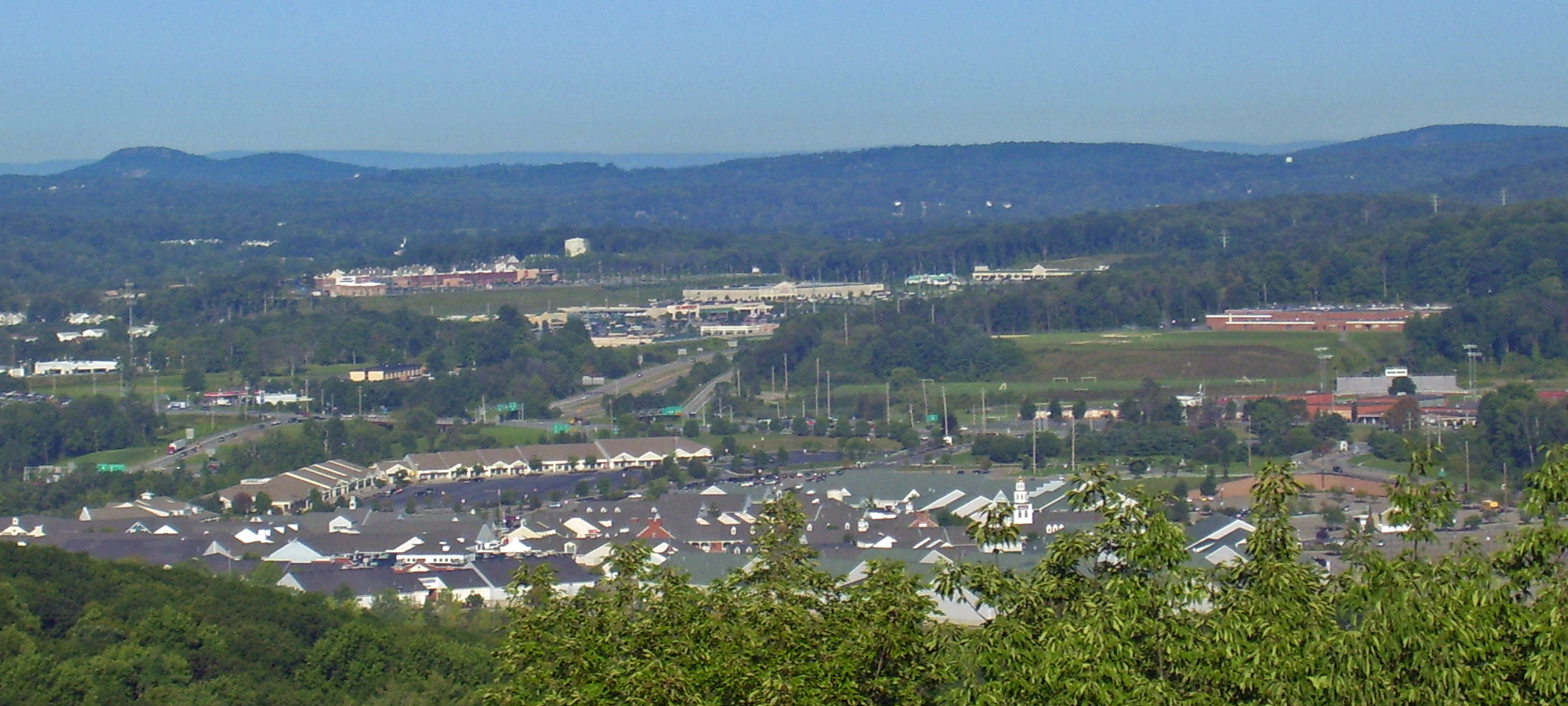
Woodbury Common and vicinity from US 6

The overlap between US 6 and NY 17M continues for another five miles (8.0 km), crossing the Wallkill River, through slightly more developed countryside to Goshen, where the two routes join the NY 17 freeway (future I-86) at exit 123. NY 17M leaves the freeway several exits to the east, but US 6 stays with it for 13 miles (21 km), connecting to NY 17A, NY 207, NY 94, and NY 208 in the villages of Goshen, Chester, and Monroe respectively. It breaks from the freeway outside of Harriman by way of a long overpass that leaves just before the Quickway meets the junction with the north–south portion of NY 17 and NY 32, an area often jammed with traffic from nearby Woodbury Common Premium Outlets on busy weekends. Another portion of traffic is bound for the U.S. Military Academy at West Point, per the signs on the thruway directing drivers to use eastbound US 6 for that purpose.

=== Long Mountain and Palisades Interstate Parkways ===
Shield for the Long Mountain Parkway

With the Thruway behind, US 6 climbs the side of a mountain as a freeway with three divided lanes (two eastbound, one westbound). A small pullout area reveals views of the mall and the area around the exit, shortly before US 6 becomes a two-lane expressway. At the top lies Harriman State Park, where US 6 becomes the Long Mountain Parkway, a 7-mile (11 km) stretch with no development. NY 293 leaves to the north to West Point's upper gates and the road widens briefly to include a middle turn lane. After dropping past a lake and then rising again, the long-distance Long Path hiking trail crosses the road on its way to the feature that gives this section of the highway its name. Driveways to the south lead to private camps that have housed various area hiking clubs since the 1920s.

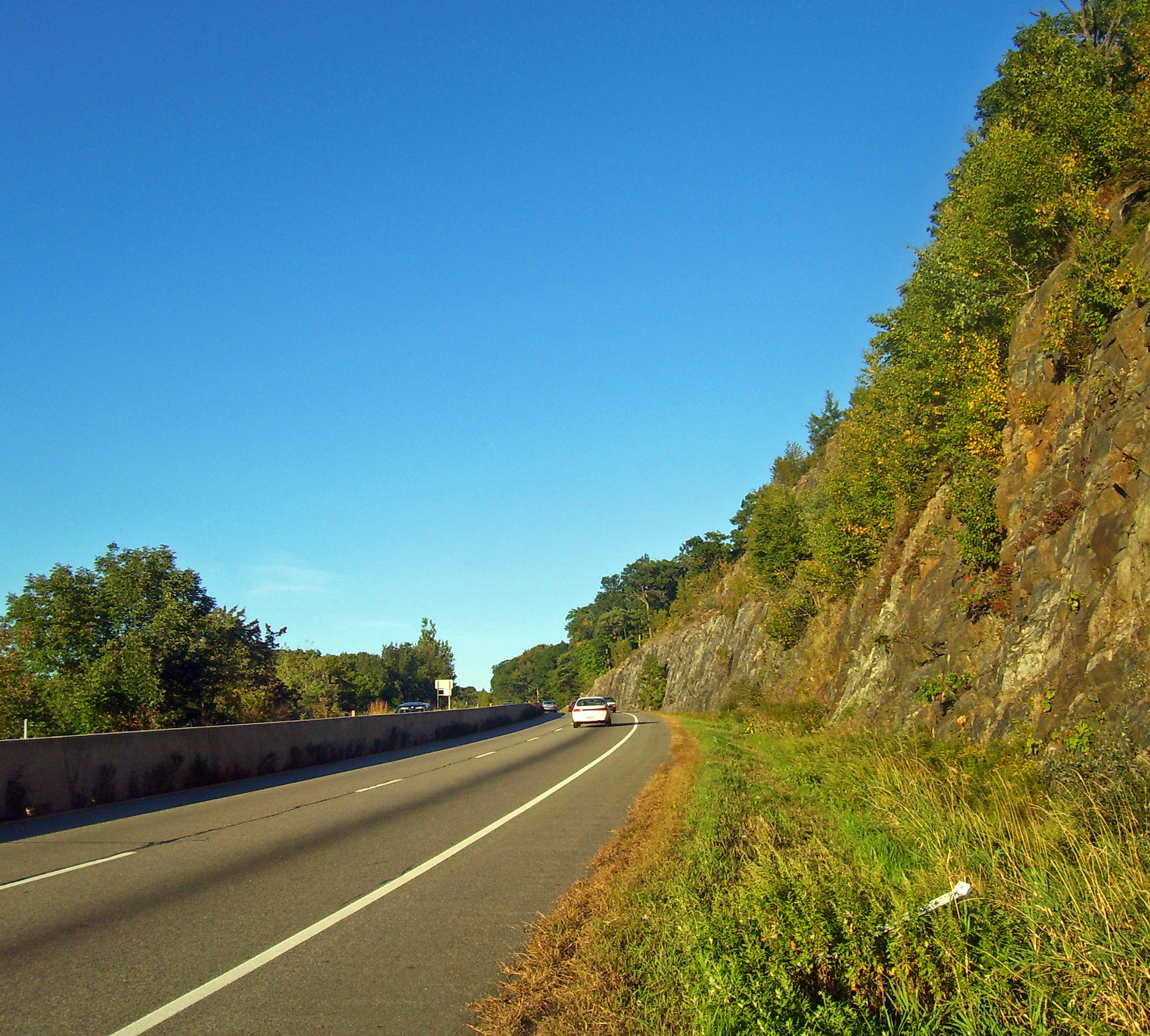
US 6 climbing into the Hudson Highlands in Harriman State Park on the west bank of the Hudson River in New York

A long descent leads to Long Mountain Circle, where Seven Lakes Drive crosses and US 6 joins the Palisades Interstate Parkway, descending slowly through a very scenic three miles (4.8 km) through Bear Mountain State Park between Bear Mountain to the south and Popolopen Torne to the north into another roundabout, the busy Bear Mountain Circle, where the parkway ends and US 6 intersects US 9W and US 202. The latter joins US 6 to cross the Hudson River via the Bear Mountain Bridge. The rocky slopes of Anthony's Nose loom ahead. A $1.50 toll is charged in this direction. The white blazes of the Appalachian Trail (AT) are also visible on the lamppost.

=== East of the Hudson River ===
Now in Westchester County, US 6, US 202, and the AT exit the bridge just south of the Putnam County line. At the east end of the bridge, the AT turns north along NY 9D, which begins here. US 6 and US 202 turn right and begin a four-mile (6.4 km) descent via Bear Mountain Bridge Road along the edge of the mountain to Peekskill. Pulloffs along this winding stretch allow drivers to take in sweeping views of that city, Haverstraw Bay, and Dunderberg Mountain across the river at the southern end of the Hudson Highlands. The road finally reaches US 6's third traffic circle just north of the city limit. Here US 9 joins the two highways for an 0.7-mile (1.1 km) concurrency, the only combination of three U.S. Routes in the state. At a traffic light south of the circle, the Bear Mountain State Parkway goes off to the east while the concurrency becomes the upper end of the Croton Expressway.

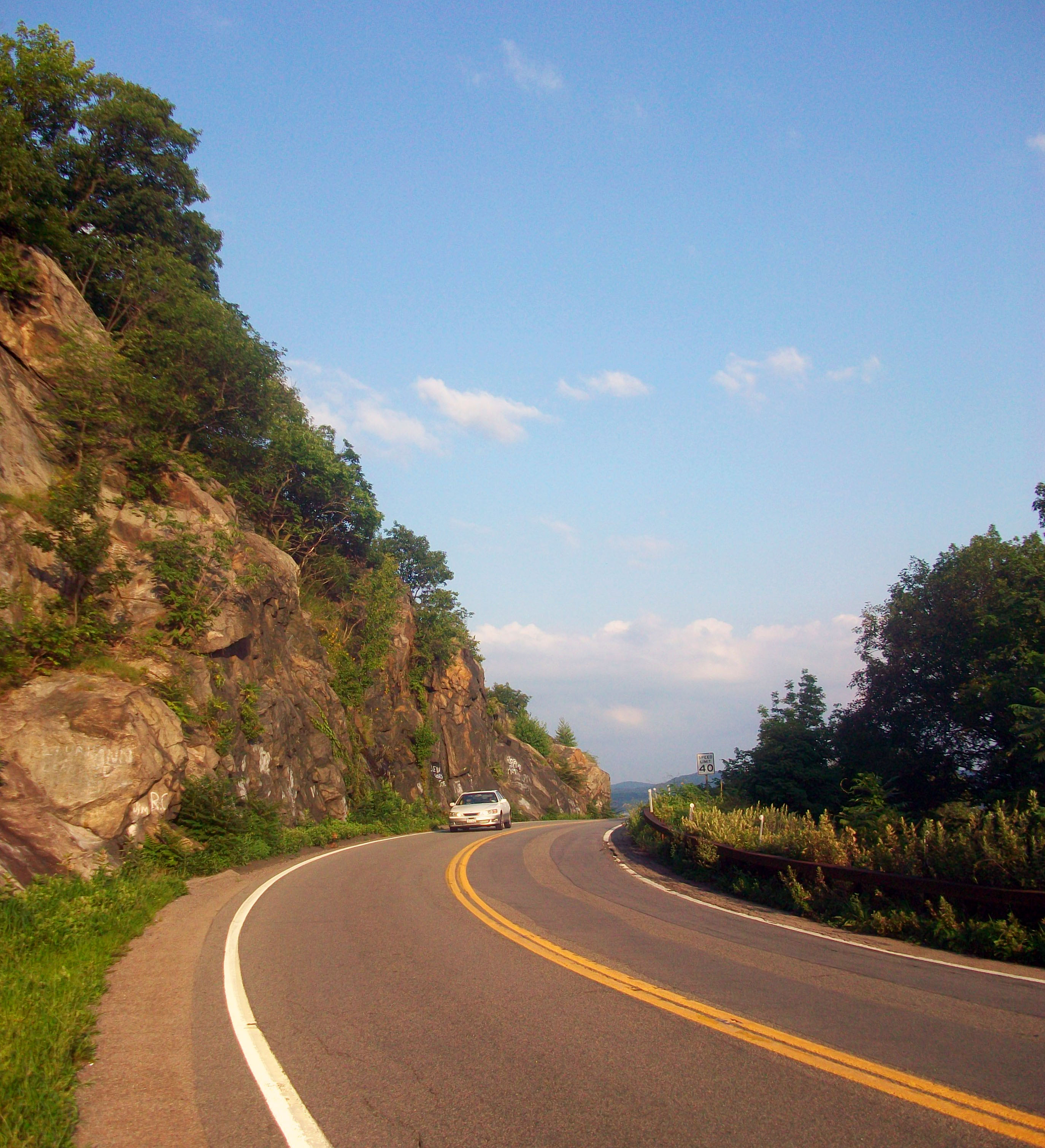
US 6/US 202 wind sharply around Anthony's Nose

US 6 and US 202 separate from US 9 at the first interchange and pick up NY 35, which begins here. The three routes follow Main Street for 0.8 miles (1.3 km) to South Broad Street, where US 202 and NY 35 turn south while US 6 continues east out of the city.

Northeast of Peekskill, US 6 works its way north, through the hamlet of Mohegan Lake and Shrub Oak, where it becomes a four-lane expressway before meeting the Taconic State Parkway. It continues east, just south of the county line, into Jefferson Valley and past Oceola Lake, where NY 6N, the lone spur of US 6 in New York, begins a northerly loop, and US 6 reverts back to a two-lane surface road. At Baldwin Place, it veers north again and enters Putnam County.

Just past the county line, NY 118 comes to its northern end. US 6 runs ever more northerly, meeting NY 6N's other end as it follows the south shore of Lake Mahopac through the village of Mahopac.

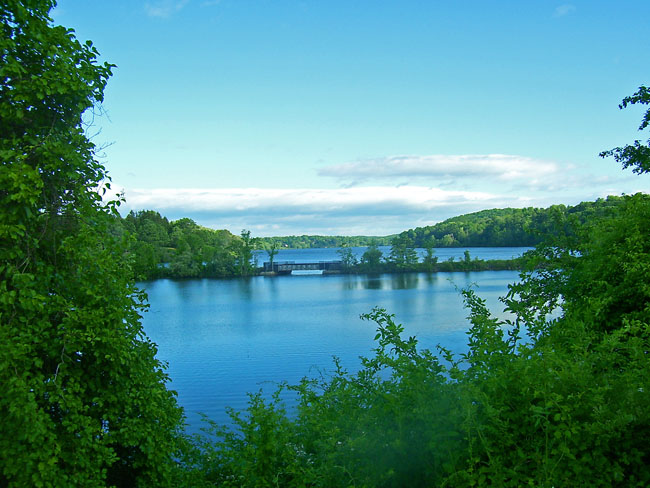
Middle Branch Reservoir

The combined influence of the New York City water supply system's Croton Watershed, which includes most of the bodies of water along this stretch of US 6, and affluent residents who build on very large lots, keeps this area lightly developed. Leaving Mahopac, US 6 curves past the south end of West Branch Reservoir and controlled Lake Gleneida to its next highway junction, the east end of NY 52 at Reed Memorial Library just south of the county seat, Carmel. The highway immediately turns toward the south again, curving around Middle Branch Reservoir at Tilly Foster to the west terminus of NY 312. At this junction, signs for Southeast station on the Harlem Line of the Metro-North Railroad are a reminder that this is still commuter country. Also appearing are the first signs for I-84, whose interchange with NY 312 is a short distance away, since Middletown.

A long bend through countryside increasingly anticipating New England brings US 6 over the Metro-North Railroad tracks and to a right turn along them takes US 6 into Brewster. At that village's Metro-North station, the highway again turns left, bringing it to an intersection just outside the village where it is reunited with US 202, here concurrent with NY 22. After crossing under the interstate, the road encounters a half-cloverleaf interchange. NY 22 turns left and leaves for Pawling and points north. I-684 is a short distance to the south, accessed by way of NY 981B, a short reference route occupying the I-684 right-of-way between I-84 and NY 22. US 6 and US 202 remain parallel with I-84, following the southern shore of one of the lakes of East Branch Reservoir. After one last highway terminus, NY 121's northern end, both cross into Danbury, Connecticut, right next to the Interstate Highway's Mill Plain Road exit.

== History ==
=== Origins and designation ===
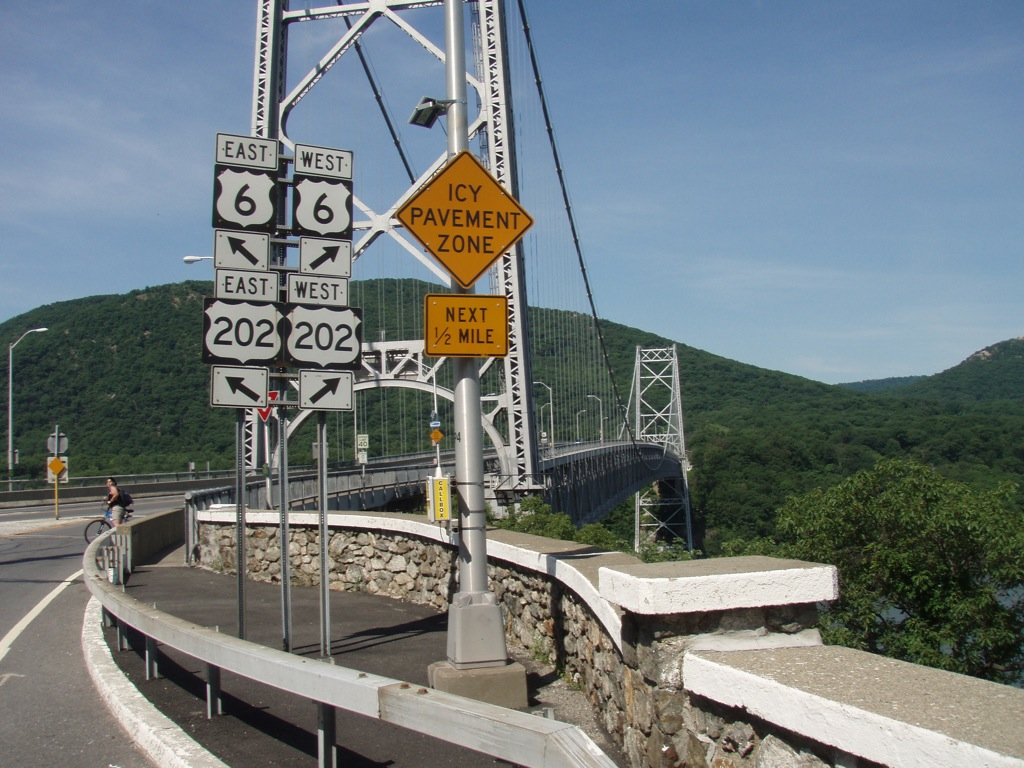
The Bear Mountain Bridge carries US 6, US 202, and the AT over the Hudson River.

The portion of US 6 in New York east of Fort Montgomery was originally designated as part of NY 37 in the mid-1920s. NY 37 began at NY 17 (now NY 17M) in Monroe and followed what is now CR 105 and NY 32 east to Central Valley. From there, it continued to Fort Montgomery via Estrada Road and modern NY 293, NY 218, and US 9W. When the U.S. Numbered Highway System was created on November 11, 1926, there was a gap in US 6 between the New York–Pennsylvania border at Port Jervis and the Connecticut state line east of Brewster. The gap remained in the first official route log published by the American Association of State Highway Officials (AASHO) in 1927; however, US 6 now entered New York at Port Jervis and followed what is now US 209 northeast to Kingston, where the west half of US 6 ended at US 9W. The eastern half of US 6 still began at the Connecticut state line east of Brewster. In 1928, AASHO modified the definition of US 6, placing the route along a new alignment further south in the state in order to eliminate the gap in the designation. It now followed a previously unnumbered highway from Port Jervis to Slate Hill and overlapped with the preexisting NY 8 from Slate Hill to Middletown and NY 17 (modern NY 17M) between Middletown and Monroe. From Monroe to Brewster, US 6 replaced NY 37. The former routing of US 6 between Port Jervis and Kingston became US 6N. US 6 was realigned again c. 1934 to bypass the U.S. Military Academy to the south. Its former alignment through the grounds became NY 293.

=== Realignments ===
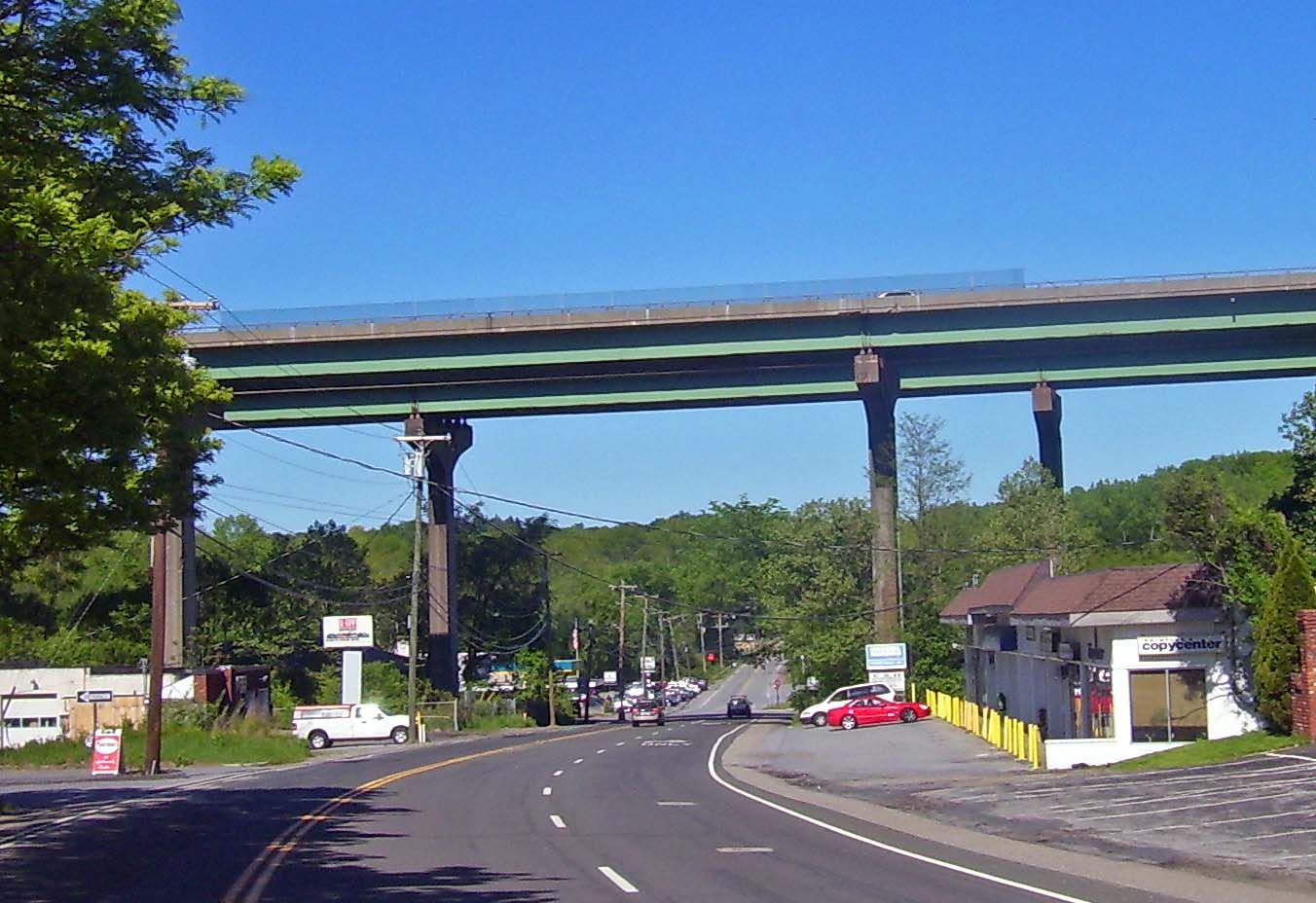
I-84 overpass north of Brewster

US 6 originally followed a more northerly alignment between Shrub Oak and Mahopac that took the route through Mahopac Falls. In the mid-1930s, US 6 was realigned to follow a new highway to the south that went directly between the two locations. The route's former alignment via Mahopac Falls was redesignated as NY 6N c. 1938. In the early 1950s, construction began on the portion of the Quickway east of Goshen. The Goshen–Chester and Chester–Harriman segments of the Quickway were completed in October 1954 and August 1955, respectively. The two segments of highway became part of a realigned US 6 and NY 17 upon opening. The original surface alignment of US 6 became part of NY 17M. Plans to construct a highway directly linking Harriman to the south end of NY 293 in Harriman State Park were proposed as early as 1954; however, construction on the road did not begin until the mid-1960s. The highway opened to traffic by 1968 as part of a rerouted US 6.

In the town of Yorktown, US 6 was originally routed along East Main Street in the areas around the hamlets of Shrub Oak and Jefferson Valley. At some point between 1968 and 1973, the portion of US 6 between the Taconic State Parkway and Curry Street was moved onto a new two-lane roadway bypassing Jefferson Valley to the south. The segment between Strawberry Road and the parkway was moved onto a new expressway bypassing Shrub Oak to the north sometime in the late 1970s or early 1980s. The old alignment of US 6 west of NY 6N is now a town-maintained road designated as CR 1309 by Westchester County for planning purposes. The segment east of NY 6N became an extension of that route and was realigned slightly to meet US 6 at a 90-degree angle. In 1993, the interchange with the Taconic State Parkway and NY 132 was reconstructed and US 6 was widened to two lanes in each direction through the interchange.

== Future ==
The New York State Department of Transportation started a year-long construction project in October 2019 in Brewster to rebuild the US 6 bridge over Metro-North Railroad's Harlem Line and to build a direct intersection with Michael Neuner Drive.

== Major intersections ==
County	Location	mi	km	Exit	Destinations	Notes
Delaware River		0.00	0.00		US 6 west / US 209 south (Pennsylvania Avenue) to I-84	Continuation into Pennsylvania
Delaware River		0.00	0.00	Mid-Delaware Bridge		
Orange	Port Jervis	0.30	0.48		Port Jervis Station	
Orange	Port Jervis	0.38	0.61		NY 42 north / NY 97 north (West Main Street) – Monticello, Barryville	Southern terminus of NY 42 and NY 97
Orange	Port Jervis	0.70	1.13		US 209 north (Kingston Avenue) – Ellenville, Kingston	East end of US 209 overlap
Orange	Town of Deerpark	2.47	3.98		I-84 / Route 23 south – Middletown, Scranton	Exit 1 on I-84; access to Route 23 via CR 15
Orange	Greenville	6.60	10.62		CR 35 north / CR 55 south (Mountain Road) to I-84 – Greenville, Otisville	Southern terminus of CR 35; northern terminus of CR 55
Orange	Wawayanda	14.25	22.93		NY 284 south – Westtown, Unionville	Northern terminus of NY 284; hamlet of Slate Hill
Orange	Wawayanda	17.75	28.57		NY 17M west – Middletown, Wallkill	West end of NY 17M overlap
Orange	Wawayanda	18.16	29.23		I-84 – Port Jervis, Newburgh	Exits 15A and 15B on I-84
Orange	Village of Goshen	23.21	37.35	Western end of freeway		
Orange	Village of Goshen	23.21	37.35		Future I-86 west / NY 17 west (Quickway) – Monticello	West end of Future I-86/NY 17 overlap; westbound exit and eastbound entrance
Orange	Village of Goshen	23.23	37.39	124	NY 17A east / NY 207 east – Florida, Goshen	Western termini of NY 17A and NY 207
Orange	Village of Goshen	24.03	38.67	125	NY 17M east / South Street	East end of NY 17M overlap
Orange	Village of Chester	27.21	43.79	126	NY 94 – Chester, Florida	
Orange	Town of Chester			127	Greycourt Road – Sugar Loaf, Warwick	Westbound exit and eastbound entrance
Orange	Blooming Grove			128	CR 51 – Oxford Depot	Westbound exit only
Orange	Blooming Grove			129	Museum Village Road	No westbound entrance
Orange	Town of Monroe	32.51	52.32	130	NY 208 – Monroe, Washingtonville	
Orange	Woodbury	35.44– 36.29	57.04– 58.40		Future I-86 east / NY 17 south / NY 32 north to I-87 / New York Thruway – Suffern, Newburgh, New York City, Albany	East end of Future I-86/NY 17 overlap; exit number not signed westbound
Orange	Harriman State Park	39.12	62.96		NY 293 north / US 6 Truck east – Cornwall, West Point	Southern terminus of NY 293; western terminus of US 6 Truck; all trucks must exit
Orange	Harriman State Park	42.49	68.38		Palisades Parkway south / Seven Lakes Drive west – New York City, New Jersey, Sloatsburg	West end of Palisades/Seven Lakes overlap; Long Mountain Circle; exit number not signed eastbound
Orange	Harriman State Park	43.09	69.35	19	Seven Lakes Drive east – Bear Mountain State Park	Signed as Perkins Memorial Drive; east end of Seven Lakes Drive overlap
Orange	Bear Mountain State Park	45.49	73.21	Eastern end of freeway		
Orange	Bear Mountain State Park	45.49	73.21		US 9W / US 202 west / US 6 Truck west – Fort Montgomery, Haverstraw, Stony Point, West Point Palisades Parkway ends	Bear Mountain Circle; all trucks must exit; east end of Palisades Parkway overlap; west end of US 202 overlap
Hudson River		45.64	73.45	Bear Mountain Bridge (eastbound toll; E-ZPass and Toll-by-Mail)		
Westchester	Cortlandt	46.09	74.17		NY 9D north / US 6 Alt. east / US 202 Alt. east – Cold Spring, Beacon	Southern terminus of NY 9D
Westchester	Cortlandt	49.73	80.03		US 9 north / US 6 Alt. west / US 202 Alt. west – Fishkill	West end of US 9 overlap; Annsville Circle
Westchester	Peekskill	49.78	80.11		Bear Mountain State Parkway east to Taconic State Parkway – Yorktown	Western terminus of Bear Mountain Parkway
Westchester	Peekskill	49.78	80.11	Western end of freeway		
Westchester	Peekskill	50.55	81.35		US 9 south (Croton Expressway) – Tarrytown, Peekskill Station NY 35 begins	East end of US 9 overlap; west end of NY 35 overlap; western terminus of NY 35
Westchester	Peekskill	50.55	81.35	Eastern end of freeway		
Westchester	Peekskill	51.30	82.56		US 202 east / NY 35 east (North Broad Street) – Yorktown, Katonah	East end of US 202/NY 35 overlap
Westchester	Cortlandt	52.97	85.25		Bear Mountain State Parkway to Taconic State Parkway – Yorktown, Bear Mountain, Bear Mountain Bridge	
Westchester	Yorktown	57.23	92.10		NY 132 south (Barger Street) – Yorktown	Northern terminus of NY 132; hamlet of Shrub Oak
Westchester	Yorktown	57.44	92.44		Taconic State Parkway – New York City, Albany	Exit 20 on Taconic State Parkway
Westchester	Yorktown	59.29	95.42		NY 6N east (East Main Street) – Mahopac Falls	Western terminus of NY 6N; hamlet of Jefferson Valley
Westchester–Putnam county line	Somers–Carmel town line	60.97	98.12		NY 118 south (Tomahawk Street) – Amawalk, Yorktown	Northern terminus of NY 118; hamlet of Baldwin Place
Putnam	Carmel	63.41	102.05		NY 6N west (South Lake Boulevard) – Mahopac Falls	Eastern terminus of NY 6N; hamlet of Mahopac
Putnam	Carmel	68.62	110.43		NY 52 west (Gleneida Avenue) to I-84 – Fishkill, Lake Carmel	Eastern terminus of NY 52; hamlet of Carmel
Putnam	Southeast	70.93	114.15		NY 312 east to I-84 – Southeast Station	Western terminus of NY 312
Putnam	Brewster	73.10	117.64		Brewster Station	
Putnam	Brewster	73.90	118.93		US 202 west / NY 22 south – Croton Falls	West end of US 202/NY 22 overlap
Putnam	Southeast	74.82	120.41		I-84 / I-684 south / NY 22 north – Newburgh, Danbury, White Plains, Pawling	Interchange; east end of NY 22 overlap; northern terminus and exit 10 on I-684
Putnam	Southeast	75.60	121.67		NY 121 south to I-84 east – North Salem	Northern terminus of NY 121; exit 69 on I-84
Putnam	Southeast	77.85	125.29		US 6 east / US 202 east – Danbury	Continuation into Connecticut
1.000 mi = 1.609 km; 1.000 km = 0.621 mi: Concurrency terminus; Electronic toll collection; Incomplete access

== Related routes ==
There are two special routes of US 6 in the state of New York, US 6 Alternate (US 6 Alt.) in Cortlandt and US 6 Truck in Woodbury–Highlands.

=== NY 6N ===
New York State Route 6N
- Location: Jefferson Valley–Mahopac
- Length: 5.07 mi (8.16 km)

New York State Route 6N (NY 6N) is a 5.07-mile (8.16 km) alternate route of US 6 through the towns of Yorktown, Westchester County, and Carmel, Putnam County. The spur leaves US 6 in the hamlet of Jefferson Valley and rejoins it in the hamlet of Mahopac. NY 6N follows a more northerly route than US 6 in order to serve Mahopac Falls. The designation was assigned c. 1938, after a previous US 6N in New York between Port Jervis and Kingston had been renamed US 209.

== See also ==
U.S. Route 6
Previous state: Pennsylvania	New York	Next state: Connecticut
