= Crompond, New York =

- CDP
- Location of Crompond, New York
- Coordinates: 41°17′21″N 73°50′4″W
- Country: United States
- State: New York
- County: Westchester
- Town: Yorktown

Area
  - Total: 2.44 sq mi (6.33 km^{2})
  - Land: 2.42 sq mi (6.28 km^{2})
  - Water: 0.019 sq mi (0.05 km^{2})
- Elevation: 420 ft (128 m)

Population (2020)
  - Total: 2,330
  - Density: 960.9/sq mi (371.02/km^{2})
- Time zone: UTC-5 (Eastern (EST))
  - Summer (DST): UTC-4 (EDT)
- ZIP code: 10517
- Area code: 914
- FIPS code: 36-19092
- GNIS feature ID: 0947765

Crompond is a hamlet and census-designated place (CDP) located in the town of Cortlandt Manor in Westchester County, New York, United States. As of the 2020 census, Crompond had a population of 2,330.

== Geography ==
According to the United States Census Bureau, the CDP has a total area of 2.5 square miles (6.5 km^{2}), of which 0.04 square miles (0.10 km^{2}), or 0.80%, is water.

The post office by the same name is approximately two miles west of the CDP, and is located in the Town of Cortlandt.

== Demographics ==
Historical population
Census	Pop.	Note	%±
2020	2,330		—
U.S. Decennial Census

=== 2020 census ===
As of the 2020 census, Crompond had a population of 2,330. The median age was 45.5 years. 22.8% of residents were under the age of 18 and 22.4% of residents were 65 years of age or older. For every 100 females there were 86.1 males, and for every 100 females age 18 and over there were 83.0 males age 18 and over.

100.0% of residents lived in urban areas, while 0.0% lived in rural areas.

There were 745 households in Crompond, of which 37.4% had children under the age of 18 living in them. Of all households, 71.0% were married-couple households, 6.4% were households with a male householder and no spouse or partner present, and 19.2% were households with a female householder and no spouse or partner present. About 15.0% of all households were made up of individuals and 8.7% had someone living alone who was 65 years of age or older.

There were 769 housing units, of which 3.1% were vacant. The homeowner vacancy rate was 0.1% and the rental vacancy rate was 5.4%.

Racial composition as of the 2020 census
Race	Number	Percent
White	1,768	75.9%
Black or African American	111	4.8%
American Indian and Alaska Native	5	0.2%
Asian	151	6.5%
Native Hawaiian and Other Pacific Islander	0	0.0%
Some other race	125	5.4%
Two or more races	170	7.3%
Hispanic or Latino (of any race)	298	12.8%

=== 2000 census ===
At the 2000 census there were 2,050 people, 609 households, and 517 families living in the CDP. The population density was 824.7 inhabitants per square mile (318.4/km^{2}). There were 623 housing units at an average density of 250.6 per square mile (96.8/km^{2}). The racial makeup of the CDP was 91.76% White, 2.44% African American, 0.05% Native American, 4.24% Asian, 0.54% from other races, and 0.98% from two or more races. Hispanic or Latino of any race were 3.80%.

Of the 609 households 46.6% had children under the age of 18 living with them, 76.4% were married couples living together, 6.2% had a female householder with no husband present, and 15.1% were non-families. 12.8% of households were one person and 4.8% were one person aged 65 or older. The average household size was 3.00 and the average family size was 3.30.

The age distribution was 26.8% under the age of 18, 4.5% from 18 to 24, 25.9% from 25 to 44, 25.7% from 45 to 64, and 17.1% 65 or older. The median age was 41 years. For every 100 females, there were 89.5 males. For every 100 females age 18 and over, there were 82.9 males.

The median household income was $88,408 and the median family income was $98,293. Males had a median income of $58,750 versus $41,842 for females. The per capita income for the CDP was $31,292. About 1.3% of families and 2.0% of the population were below the poverty line, including 1.3% of those under age 18 and none of those age 65 or over.

== Education ==
Lakeland Central Schools is the area school district.
