= New York State Route 448 =

State highway in Westchester County, New York, US

New York State Route 448
- Bedford Road
- Map of Rockland and Westchester counties with NY 448 highlighted in red

Route information
- Maintained by NYSDOT
- Length: 3.90 mi (6.28 km)
- Existed: November 1970–present

Major junctions
- West end: US 9 in Sleepy Hollow
- East end: NY 117 in Mount Pleasant

Location
- Country: United States
- State: New York
- Counties: Westchester

Highway system
- New York Highways; Interstate; US; State; Reference; Parkways
← NY 446	→ NY 454

New York State Route 448 (NY 448) is a 3.90-mile (6.28 km) long state highway in western Westchester County, New York, in the United States. The route begins in the village of Sleepy Hollow at U.S. Route 9 (US 9) and goes in a northeast direction through the Pocantico Hills community in Mount Pleasant. It ends at NY 117 in Mount Pleasant, near the junction of NY 117 with Saw Mill River Road (NY 9A and NY 100) and the Taconic State Parkway. From 1930 to November 1970, NY 448 was part of NY 117.

== Route description ==
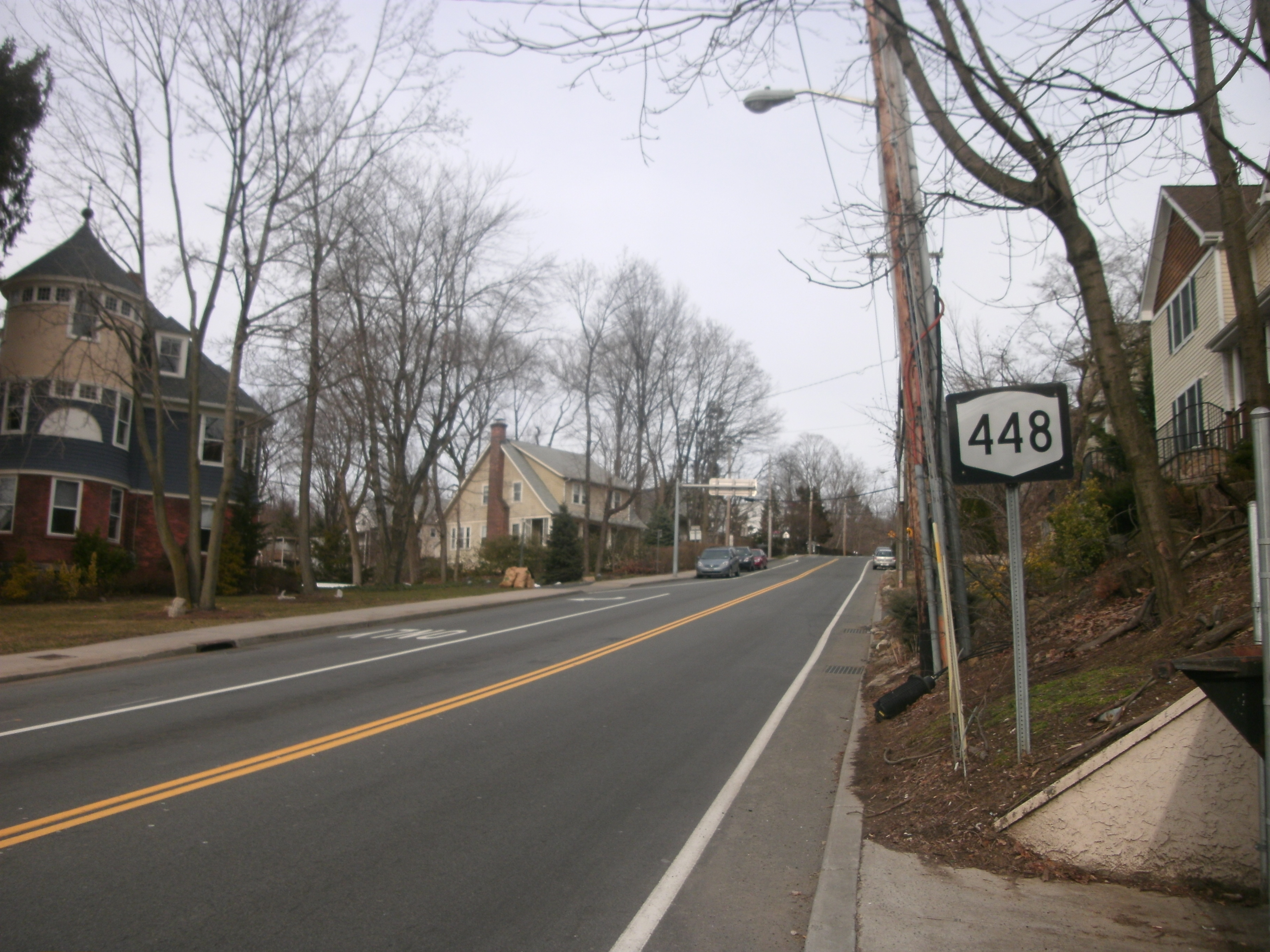
NY 448 proceeding northeast from US 9 in Sleepy Hollow

NY 448 begins at an intersection with US 9 (Broadway) in the village of Sleepy Hollow, then heads through a residential area as Bedford Road. After the Webber Avenue intersection, NY 448 turns to the northeast, where it passes the athletic fields of Sleepy Hollow High School. NY 448 intersects with Sleepy Hollow Road, which leads into a residential development and parallels NY 448 northeastward for a short distance.

Near the southern edge of Rockefeller State Park Preserve, NY 448 turns east and enters Kykuit, the estate of the Rockefeller family. At the hamlet of Pocantico Hills, the highway intersects with Lake Road and turns to the northeast, passing through more residential areas as it leaves the estate. NY 448 passes the Pocantico Hills Central School on its way, continuing northeast towards Phelps Way (NY 117). The road continues through a vacant area and heads northward into Mount Pleasant, where NY 448 terminates at an intersection with NY 117. Bedford Road continues east of this point as part of NY 117.

== History ==
The entirety of NY 448 was originally designated as part of NY 117 in the 1930 renumbering of state highways in New York. In 1932–33, John D. Rockefeller offered to straighten a short section of NY 117 that passed through Kykuit, the Rockefeller family estate, citing safety concerns. The state expressed similar sentiments in 1949, deeming the stretch unsafe for commercial traffic. By the 1960s, the annual average daily traffic count along NY 117 had grown to 5,000 vehicles per day, far more than the 1,800 that the road had originally been built to serve. This led the New York State Legislature to approve plans for a new alignment for NY 117 in 1965. The new road would be located north of the existing road, relieving traffic congestion on US 9 and NY 117 and providing access to NY 9A, US 9, the Taconic State Parkway and the proposed Hudson River Expressway in the North Tarrytown area.

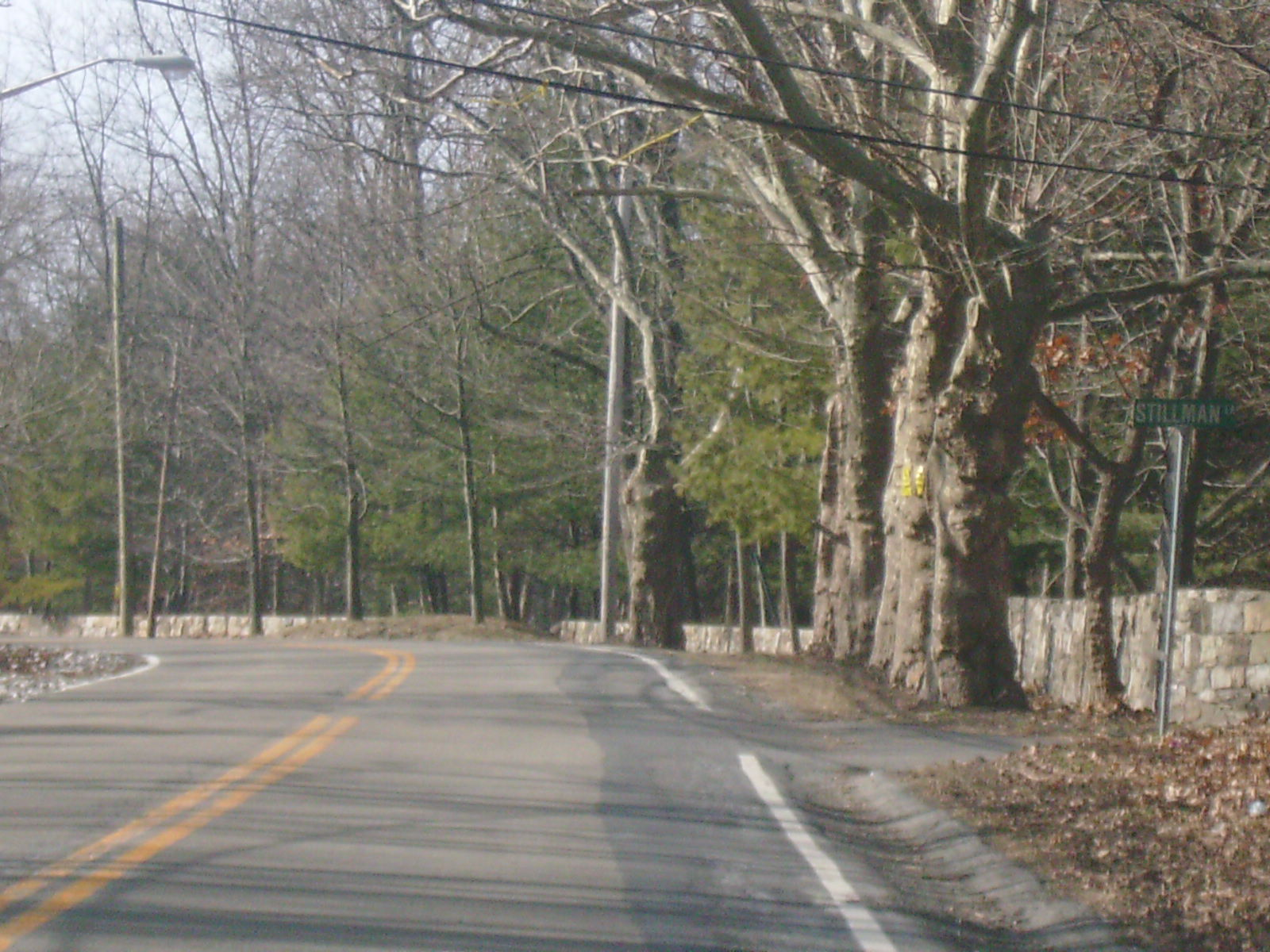
NY 448 southbound roughly 0.5 miles (0.80 km) southwest of NY 117

Several different routes were considered for the alignment. The path ultimately selected by the state was a four-lane expressway one mile north of the current alignment that would cost $5.5 million (1966 USD). Another proposed route would have cost $8 million (1966 USD), containing additional grades and curves while coming closer to the Rockefeller estate. Construction on the new NY 117 was expected to begin before the end of 1966. The reaction from area residents was mixed, with some believing that the only beneficiaries of a realigned NY 117 was the Rockefeller family. Rumors that the Rockefeller family had wanted NY 117 moved had existed as early as the 1930s, and US Representative Richard Ottinger believed that Nelson Rockefeller, then the Governor of New York, was using his political power to move NY 117 away from Kykuit at the cost of the state. An aide to the Rockefellers denied this charge.

The Sleepy Hollow Valley Committee, comprising 11 members whose homes were in the right-of-way of the new alignment, protested that the route would destroy the countryside. They were opposed by the Potantico Hills Residents Committee, as most residents in Potantico Hills supported the new alignment. The former committee filed a lawsuit in the New York State Supreme Court to block the new roadway, and they were joined in their efforts by conservationist groups and the village of North Tarrytown. On June 28, 1966, the case was heard by the court. Engineers with the New York State Department of Highways were accused of showing "unprecedented pell-mell haste" in working on a project with the Rockefellers before any injunctions could stop it. State Attorney General Joseph Romano countered that the state was not conspiring to provide anyone special benefits, saying that NY 117 was dangerous for years and opponents to the project were "thinking up little gimmicks, picayune arguments and ethereal ideas to mislead the court."

A request by the state to dismiss the suit was denied in August 1966, and the case was eventually heard by the state Court of Appeals, the highest court in the state. In the meantime, the state built the easternmost mile (1.6 km) of the new alignment, which was not affected by the lawsuit. On July 7, 1967, the court ruled 6–1 in favor of the Sleepy Hollow Valley Committee. As a result, the western half of the new road was moved an additional mile to the north, bypassing North Tarrytown completely. The new alignment of NY 117 was completed in November 1970 and its former alignment along Bedford Road was redesignated as NY 448.

== Major intersections ==
The entire route is in Westchester County.

Location	mi	km	Destinations	Notes
Sleepy Hollow	0.00	0.00	US 9 (Broadway) – Tarrytown, Ossining	Western terminus
Mount Pleasant	3.90	6.28	NY 117 (Bedford Road / Phelps Way)	Eastern terminus
1.000 mi = 1.609 km; 1.000 km = 0.621 mi
