= Broadway (Manhattan) =

North-south avenue in New York

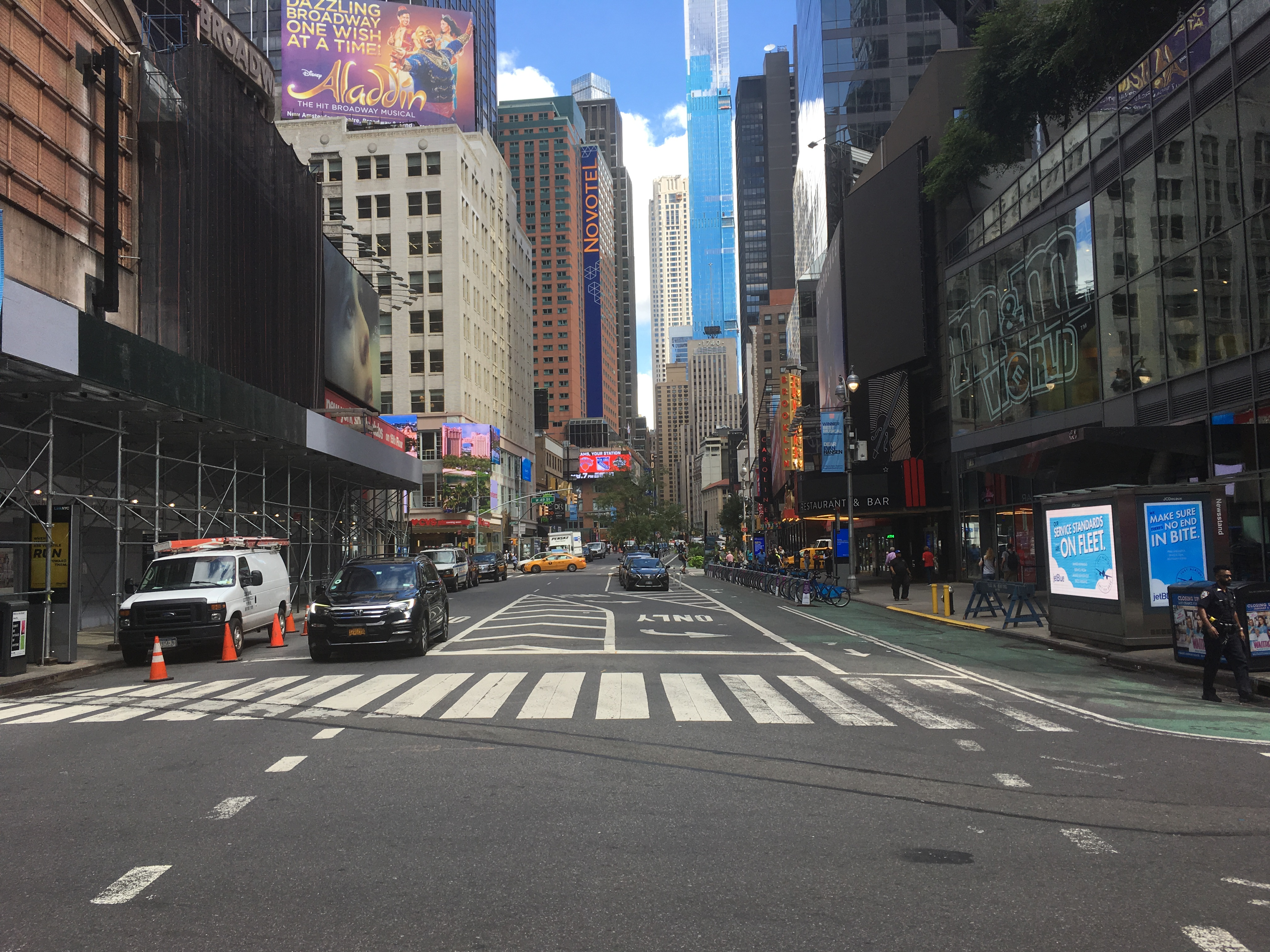
- Broadway seen from 48th Street in the Theater District
- Interactive map of Broadway
- Component highways: US 9 from Washington Heights to Mount Pleasant
- Location: New York City (Manhattan and The Bronx) and Westchester County, New York, United States
- South end: Battery Place in Financial District
- Major junctions: I-95 / US 1-9 in Washington Heights; NY 9A / Henry Hudson Parkway in Riverdale; NY 9A in Yonkers; I-87 / I-287 / New York Thruway / NY 119 in Tarrytown
- North end: US 9 / NY 117 / Kendal Way in Mount Pleasant

Broadway (/ˈbrɔːdweɪ/) is a street and major thoroughfare in the U.S. state of New York. The street runs from Battery Place at Bowling Green in the south of Manhattan for 13 mi (20.9 km) through the borough, over the Broadway Bridge, and 2 mi (3.2 km) through the Bronx, exiting north from New York City to run an additional 18 mi (29.0 km) through the Westchester County municipalities of Yonkers, Hastings-on-Hudson, Dobbs Ferry, Irvington, Tarrytown, and Sleepy Hollow, after which the road continues, but is no longer called "Broadway". (Note: It is variously called the Albany Post Road and Highland Avenue, or both.) (Note: There are four other streets named "Broadway" in New York City's remaining three boroughs: one each in Brooklyn (see main article) and Staten Island, and two in Queens (one running from Astoria to Elmhurst, and the other in Hamilton Beach). Each borough therefore has a street named "Broadway". See also from Forgotten NY: Broadway in the Bronx, Page 1 and Page 2; Broadway in Queens, Page 1 and Page 2; Broadway in Staten Island) The latter portion of Broadway north of the George Washington Bridge/I-95 underpass comprises a portion of U.S. Route 9.

It is the oldest north–south main thoroughfare in New York City, with much of the current street said to have begun as the Wickquasgeck trail before the arrival of Europeans. This then formed the basis for one of the primary thoroughfares of the Dutch New Amsterdam colony, which continued under British rule, although most of it did not bear its current name until the late 19th century. Some portions of Broadway in Manhattan are interrupted for continuous vehicle traffic, including Times Square, Herald Square, and Union Square, and instead used as pedestrian-only plazas. South of Columbus Circle, the road is one-way going southbound.

Broadway in Midtown Manhattan is known widely as the heart of the American commercial theatrical industry, and is used as a metonym for it, as well as in the names of alternative theatrical ventures such as off-Broadway and off-off-Broadway. In Lower Manhattan, a section of Broadway is referred to as the Canyon of Heroes for the ticker-tape parades that have been used to celebrate or welcome various worthies.

== History ==
=== Lenape history ===
The Lenape, the Native American inhabitants of Manhattan at the time of Dutch colonization, maintained the Wickquasgeck trail, which connected the various villages of Manhattan. This trail originally wound through swamps and rocks along the length of Manhattan Island. (Note: According to author Russell Shorto: "Broadway does not follow the precise course of the Indian trail, as some historians would have it. To follow the Wickquasgeck trail today, one would take Broadway north from the Customs House, jog eastward along Park Row, then follow the Bowery to Twenty-third Street. From there, the trail snaked up the east side of the island. It crossed westward through the top of Central Park; the paths of Broadway and the Wickquasgeck trail converge again at the top of the island. The trail continued into the Bronx; Route 9 follows it northward.")

=== Colonial history ===
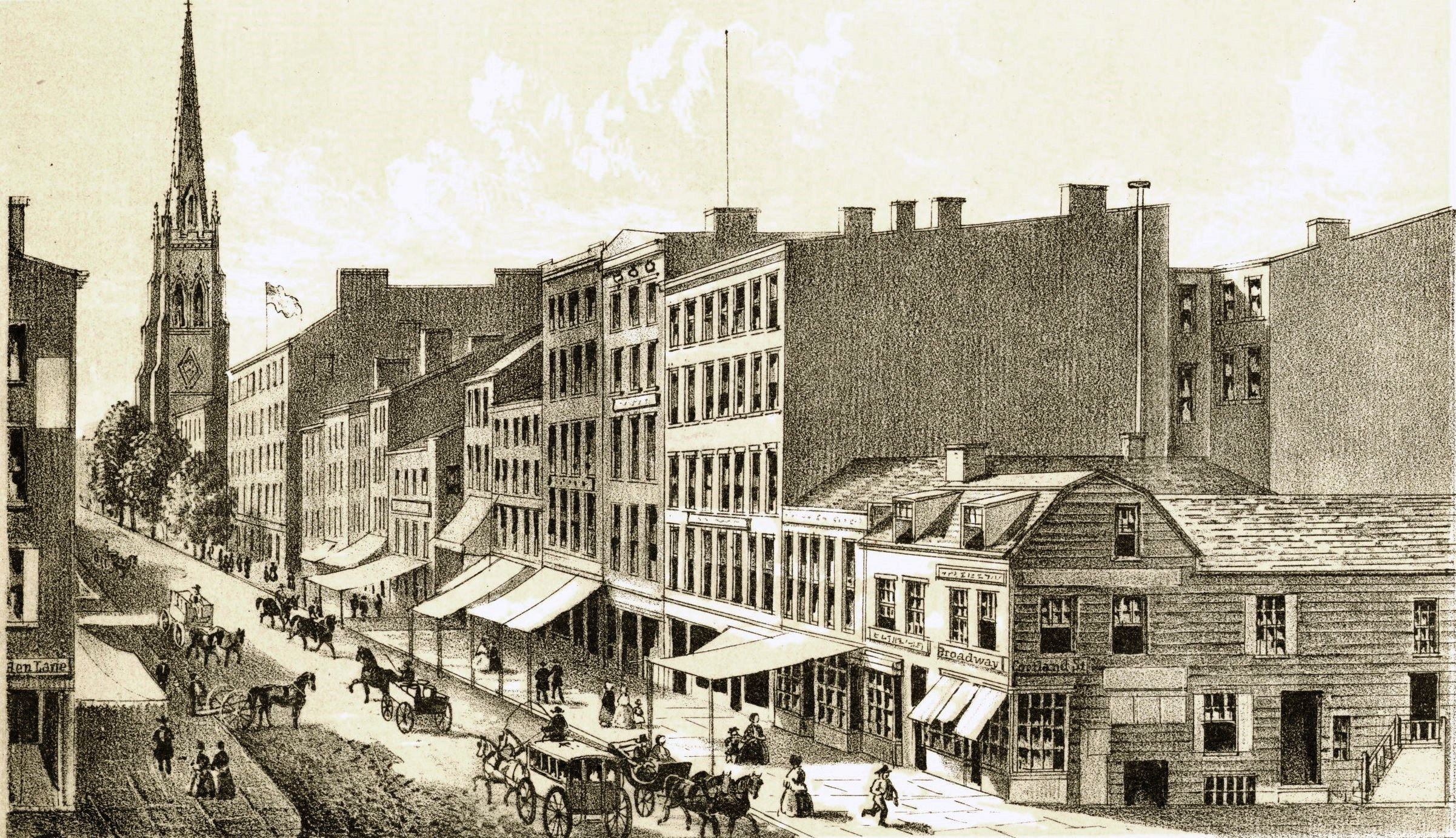
An 1834 illustration of Broadway. This site is currently occupied by the One Liberty Plaza.

Upon the arrival of the Dutch, the trail was widened and soon became the main road through the island from Nieuw Amsterdam at the southern tip. The Dutch explorer and entrepreneur David Pietersz. de Vries gives the first mention of it in his journal for the year 1642 ("the Wickquasgeck Road over which the Indians passed daily"). The Dutch called it the Heeren Wegh or Heeren Straat, meaning "Gentlemen's Way" or "Gentlemen's Street" – echoing the name of a similar street in Amsterdam – or "High Street" or "the Highway"; it was renamed "Broadway" after the British took over the city, because of its unusual width. (Note: It is also claimed that the Dutch called it "Breede Weg", of which "Broadway" is a literal translation. See: Ellis, Edward Robb (1966). The Epic of New York City. Old Town Books. p. 26.; "Some New Publication: Peter Stuyvesant's Unhappy Rule". The New York Times. May 29, 1893. ISSN 0362-4331. Archived from the original on July 11, 2019. "One other thing which came from the Dutch is the name of our street, Broadway, which by them was called the Breede Weg, the translation being afterward made by the English") Although currently the name of the street is simply "Broadway", in a 1776 map of New York City, it is labeled as "Broadway Street".

=== 18th century ===
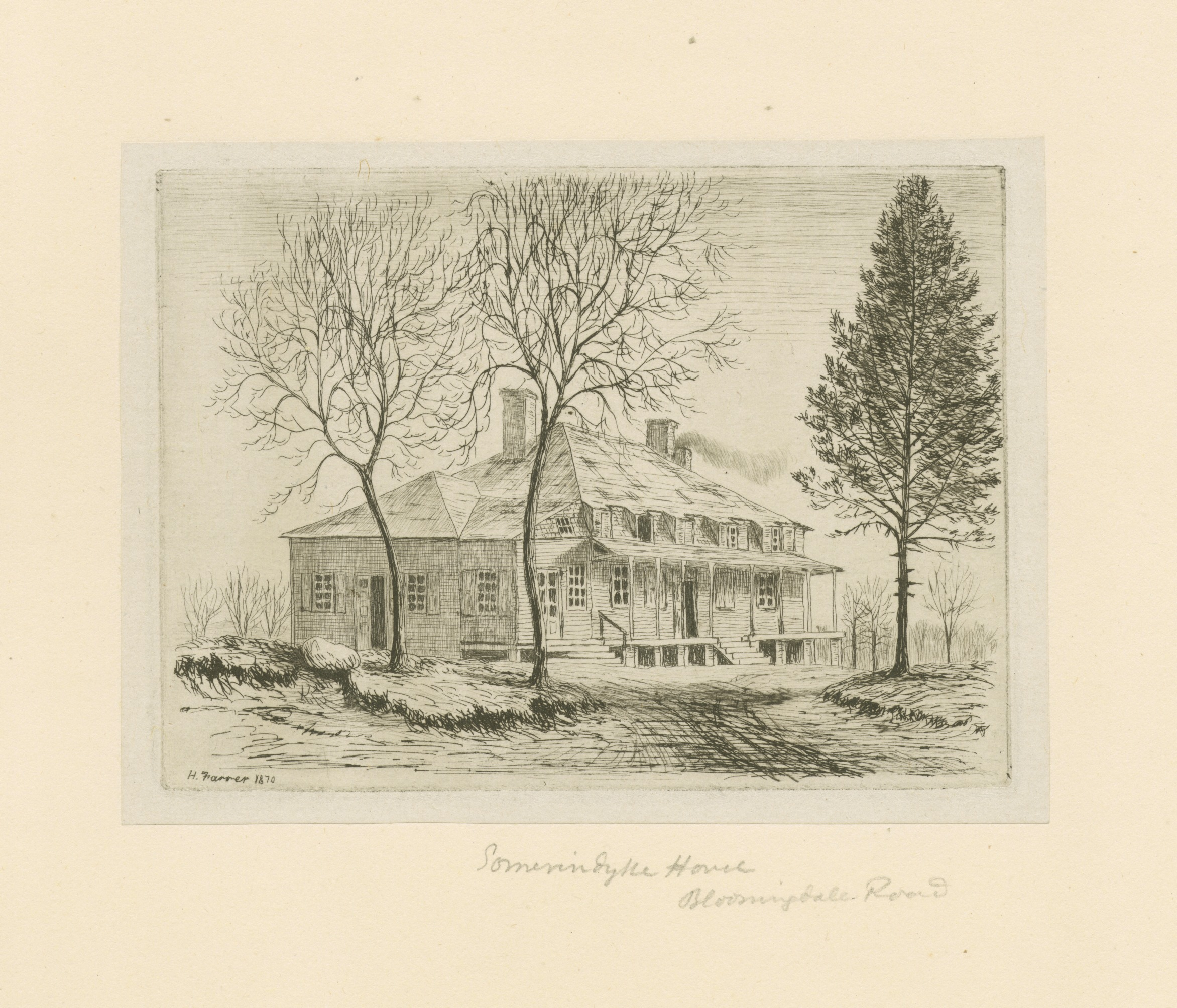
A mid-19th century illustration of Somerindyke House on Bloomingdale Road

In the 18th century, Broadway ended at the town commons north of Wall Street. The part of Broadway in what is now Lower Manhattan was initially known as Great George Street. Traffic continued up the East Side of the island via Eastern Post Road and the West Side via Bloomingdale Road, which opened in 1703, continued up to 117th Street and contributed to the development of the modern Upper West Side into an upscale area with mansions.

In her 1832 book Domestic Manners of the Americans, Fanny Trollope wrote of her impressions of New York City in general and of Broadway in particular:

This noble street may vie with any I ever saw, for its length and breadth, its handsome shops, neat awnings, excellent trottoir, and well-dressed pedestrians. It has not the crowded glitter of Bond Street equipages, nor the gorgeous fronted palaces of Regent Street; but it is magnificent in its extent, and ornamented by several handsome buildings, some of them surrounded by grass and trees.

=== 19th century ===
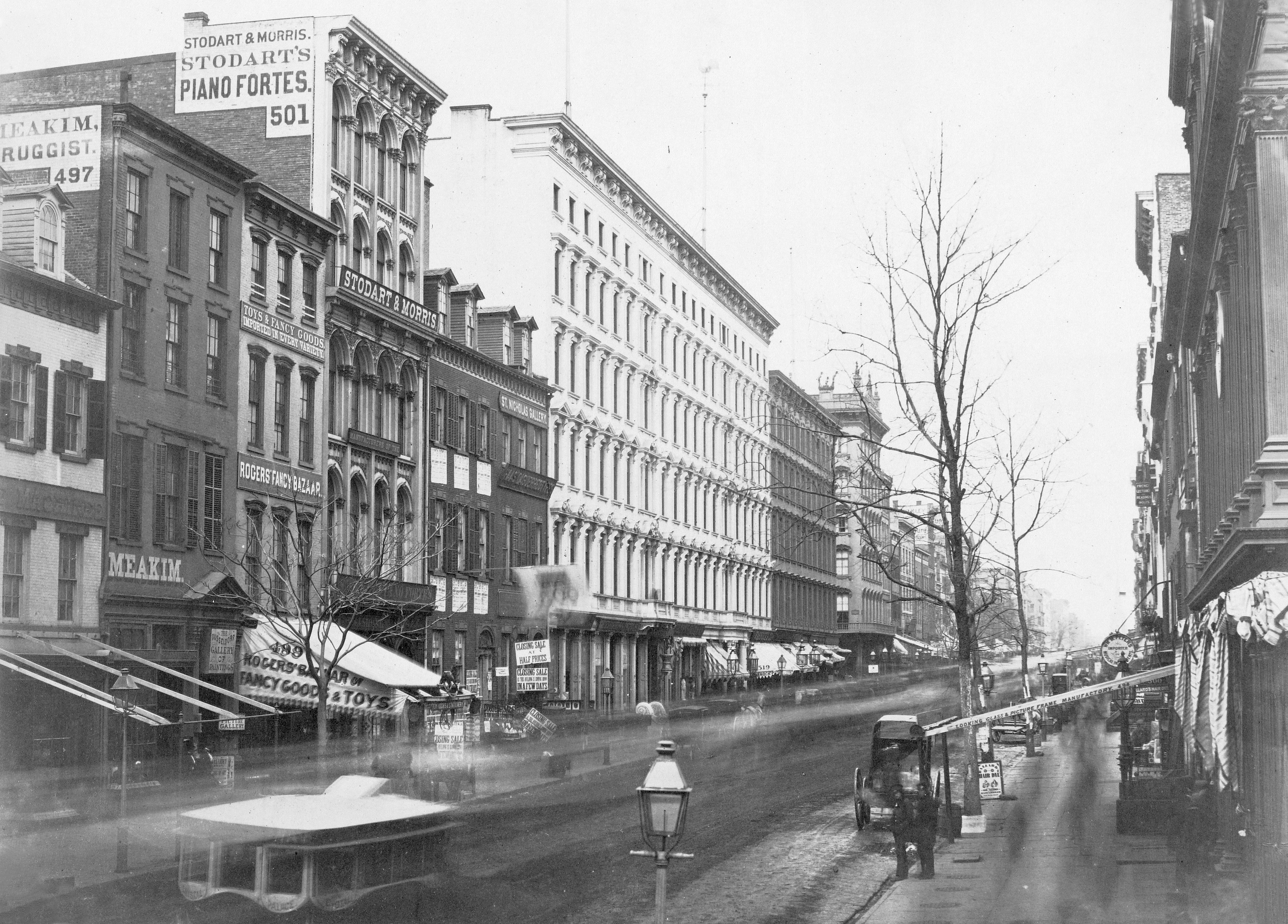
Broadway seen from the south at Broome Street, c. 1853–55

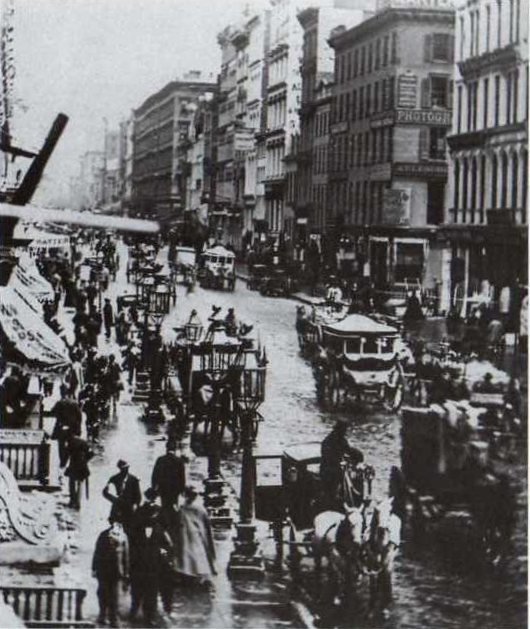
Broadway in 1860

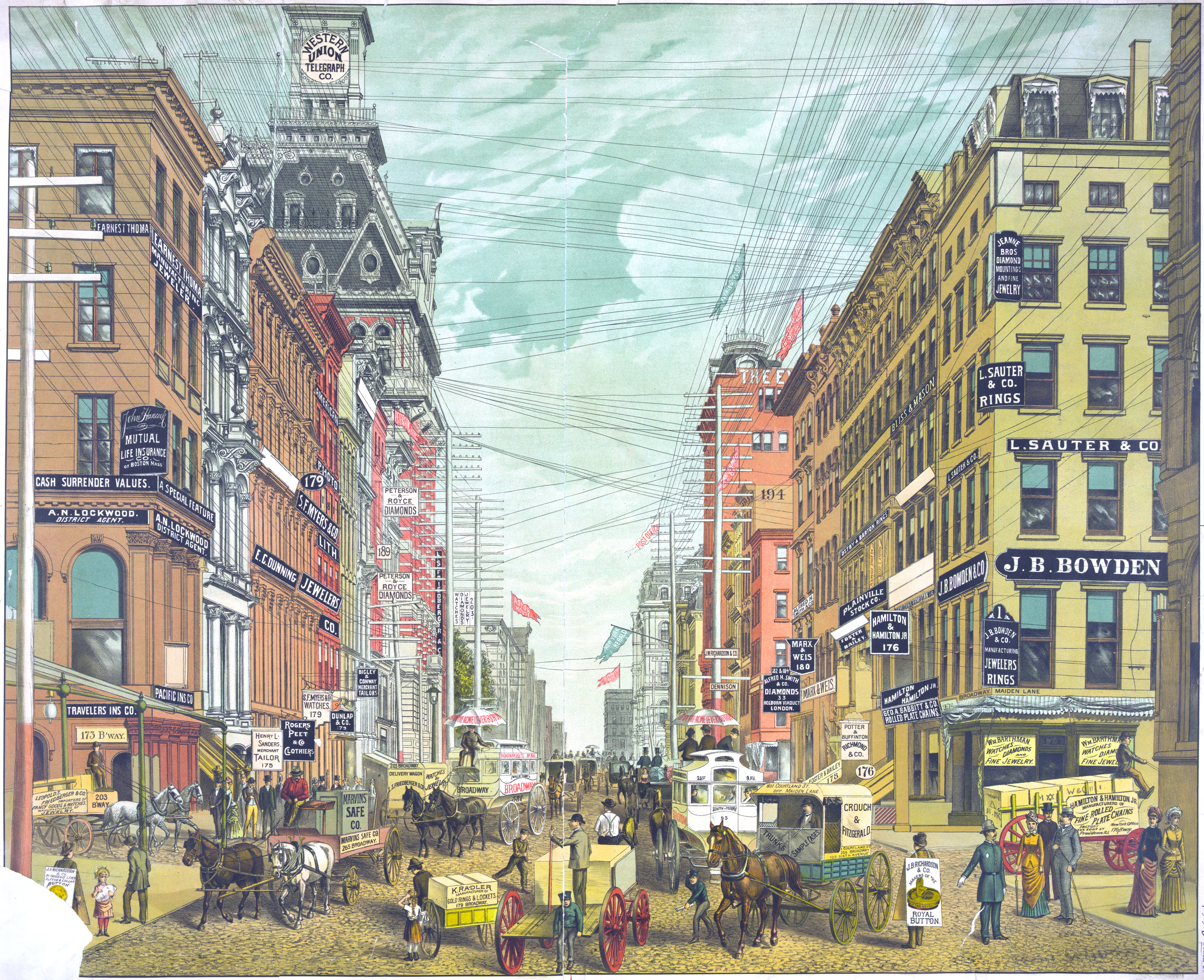
In 1885, the Broadway commercial district was overrun with telephone, telegraph, and electrical lines. This view was north from Cortlandt and Maiden Lane.

In 1868, Bloomingdale Road between 59th Street (at the Grand Circle, now Columbus Circle) and 155th Streets would be paved and widened, becoming an avenue with landscaped medians. It was called "Western Boulevard" or "The Boulevard". An 1897 official map of the city shows a segment of what is now Broadway as "Kingsbridge Road" in the vicinity of Washington Heights.

On February 14, 1899, the name "Broadway" was extended to the entire Broadway / Bloomingdale / Boulevard / Kingsbridge complex.

=== 20th century ===
In the 20th century, a 30-block stretch of Broadway, extending mainly between Times Square at 42nd Street and Sherman Square at 72nd Street, formed part of Manhattan's "Automobile Row". Before the first decade of the 20th century, the area was occupied mostly by equestrian industries and was "thoroughly lifeless", but by 1907, The New York Times characterized this section of Broadway as having "almost a solid line of motor vehicle signs all the way from Times Square to Sherman Square". In the late 1900s and early 1910s, several large automobile showrooms, stores, and garages were built on Broadway, including the U.S. Rubber Company Building at 58th Street, the B.F. Goodrich showroom at 1780 Broadway (between 58th and 57th Streets), the Fisk Building at 250 West 57th Street, and the Demarest and Peerless Buildings at 224 West 57th Street.

Broadway once was a two-way street for its entire length. The present status, in which it runs one-way southbound south of Columbus Circle (59th Street), came about in several stages. On June 6, 1954, Seventh Avenue became southbound and Eighth Avenue became northbound south of Broadway. None of Broadway became one-way, but the increased southbound traffic between Columbus Circle (Eighth Avenue) and Times Square (Seventh Avenue) caused the city to re-stripe that section of Broadway for four southbound and two northbound lanes. Broadway became one-way from Columbus Circle south to Herald Square (34th Street) on March 10, 1957, in conjunction with Sixth Avenue becoming one-way from Herald Square north to 59th Street and Seventh Avenue becoming one-way from 59th Street south to Times Square (where it crosses Broadway). On June 3, 1962, Broadway became one-way south of Canal Street, with Trinity Place and Church Street carrying northbound traffic.

Another change was made on November 10, 1963, when Broadway became one-way southbound from Herald Square to Madison Square (23rd Street) and Union Square (14th Street) to Canal Street, and two routes – Sixth Avenue south of Herald Square and Centre Street, Lafayette Street, and Fourth Avenue south of Union Square – became one-way northbound. Finally, at the same time as Madison Avenue became one-way northbound and Fifth Avenue became one-way southbound, Broadway was made one-way southbound between Madison Square (where Fifth Avenue crosses) and Union Square on January 14, 1966, completing its conversion south of Columbus Circle.

=== 21st century ===
==== 2000s ====
In 2001, a one-block section of Broadway between 72nd Street and 73rd Street at Verdi Square was reconfigured. Its easternmost lanes, which formerly hosted northbound traffic, were turned into a public park when a new subway entrance for the 72nd Street station was built in the exact location of these lanes. Northbound traffic on Broadway is now channeled onto Amsterdam Avenue to 73rd Street, makes a left turn on the three-lane 73rd Street, and then a right turn on Broadway shortly afterward.

In August 2008, two traffic lanes from 42nd to 35th Streets were taken out of service and converted to public plazas. Bike lanes were added on Broadway from 42nd Street to Union Square.

Since May 2009, the portions of Broadway through Duffy Square, Times Square, and Herald Square have been closed entirely to automobile traffic, except for cross traffic on the Streets and Avenues, as part of a traffic and pedestrianization experiment, with the pavement reserved exclusively for walkers, cyclists, and those lounging in temporary seating placed by the city. The city decided that the experiment was successful, and decided to make the change permanent in February 2010. Though the anticipated benefits to traffic flow were not as large as hoped, pedestrian injuries dropped dramatically and foot traffic increased in the designated areas; the project was popular with both residents and businesses. The current portions converted into pedestrian plazas are between West 47th and 42nd Streets within Times and Duffy Squares, and between West 35th and 33rd Streets in the Herald Square area. Additionally, portions of Broadway in Madison Square and Union Square have been dramatically narrowed, allowing ample pedestrian plazas to exist along the side of the road.

==== 2010s ====
A terrorist attempted to set off a bomb on Broadway in Times Square on May 1, 2010. The attempted bomber was sentenced to life in prison.

In May 2013, the NYCDOT decided to redesign Broadway between 35th and 42nd Streets for the second time in five years, owing to poor connections between pedestrian plazas and decreased vehicular traffic. With the new redesign, the bike lane is now on the right side of the street; it was formerly on the left side adjacent to the pedestrian plazas, causing conflicts between pedestrian and bicycle traffic.

In spring 2017, as part of a capital reconstruction of Worth Square, Broadway between 24th and 25th Streets was converted to a shared street, where through vehicles are banned and delivery vehicles are restricted to 5 miles per hour (8.0 km/h). Delivery vehicles go northbound from Fifth Avenue to 25th Street for that one block, reversing the direction of traffic and preventing vehicles from going south on Broadway south of 25th Street. The capital project expands on a 2008 initiative where part of the intersection of Broadway and Fifth Avenue was repurposed into a public plaza, simplifying that intersection. As part of the 2017 project, Worth Square was expanded, converting the adjoining block of Broadway into a "shared street".

In September 2019, the pedestrian space in the Herald Square area was expanded between 33rd and 32nd Streets alongside Greeley Square. Five blocks of Broadway—from 50th to 48th, 39th to 39th, and 23rd to 21st Street—were converted into shared streets in late 2021. The block between 40th and 39th Streets, known as Golda Meir Square, was closed to vehicular traffic at that time.

==== 2020s ====
During 2020, the section from 31st to 25th Street was converted to a temporary pedestrian-only street called NoMad Piazza as part of the New York City Department of Transportation's Open Streets program. Following the success of the pedestrian-only street, the Flatiron/23rd Street Partnership BID closed the section between 25th and 27th Streets to vehicular traffic again during 2021 and 2022.

City officials announced in March 2023 that the section of Broadway between 32nd and 21st Streets would be redesigned as part of a project called Broadway Vision. The section between 32nd and 25th Streets would receive a bidirectional bike lane and would be converted to a shared street. Cars would be banned permanently from 27th to 25th Street. That work was finished the same July. In March 2024, the DOT announced plans to convert the section between 17th and 21st Streets into a shared street; that December, the DOT announced that the section between 39th and 40th Streets would be closed to vehicles and that the block from 38th to 39th Streets would become a shared street. Officials announced plans in 2026 to reconstruct 21st to 27th Streets with permanent shared streets, pedestrian plazas, and bike lanes for $156 million.

== Route description ==
Broadway runs the length of Manhattan Island, roughly parallel to the North River (the portion of the Hudson River bordering Manhattan), from Bowling Green at the south to Inwood at the northern tip of the island. South of Columbus Circle, it is a one-way southbound street. Since 2009, vehicular traffic has been banned at Times Square between 47th and 42nd Streets, and at Herald Square between 35th and 33rd Streets as part of a pilot program; the right-of-way is intact and reserved for cyclists and pedestrians. From the northern shore of Manhattan, Broadway crosses Spuyten Duyvil Creek via the Broadway Bridge and continues through Marble Hill (a discontiguous portion of the borough of Manhattan) and the Bronx into Westchester County. U.S. 9 continues to be known as Broadway until its junction with NY 117.

=== Lower Manhattan ===
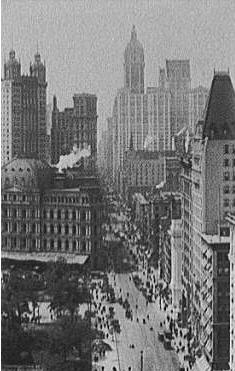
Downtown Broadway in 1909

The section of lower Broadway from its origin at Bowling Green to City Hall Park is the historical location for the city's ticker-tape parades, and is sometimes called the "Canyon of Heroes" during such events. West of Broadway, as far as Canal Street, was the city's fashionable residential area until c. 1825; landfill has more than tripled the area, and the Hudson River shore now lies far to the west, beyond Tribeca and Battery Park City.

Broadway marks the boundary between Greenwich Village to the west and the East Village to the east, passing Astor Place. It is a short walk from there to New York University near Washington Square Park, which is at the foot of Fifth Avenue. A bend in front of Grace Church allegedly avoids an earlier tavern; from 10th Street it begins its long diagonal course across Manhattan, headed almost due north.

=== Midtown Manhattan ===
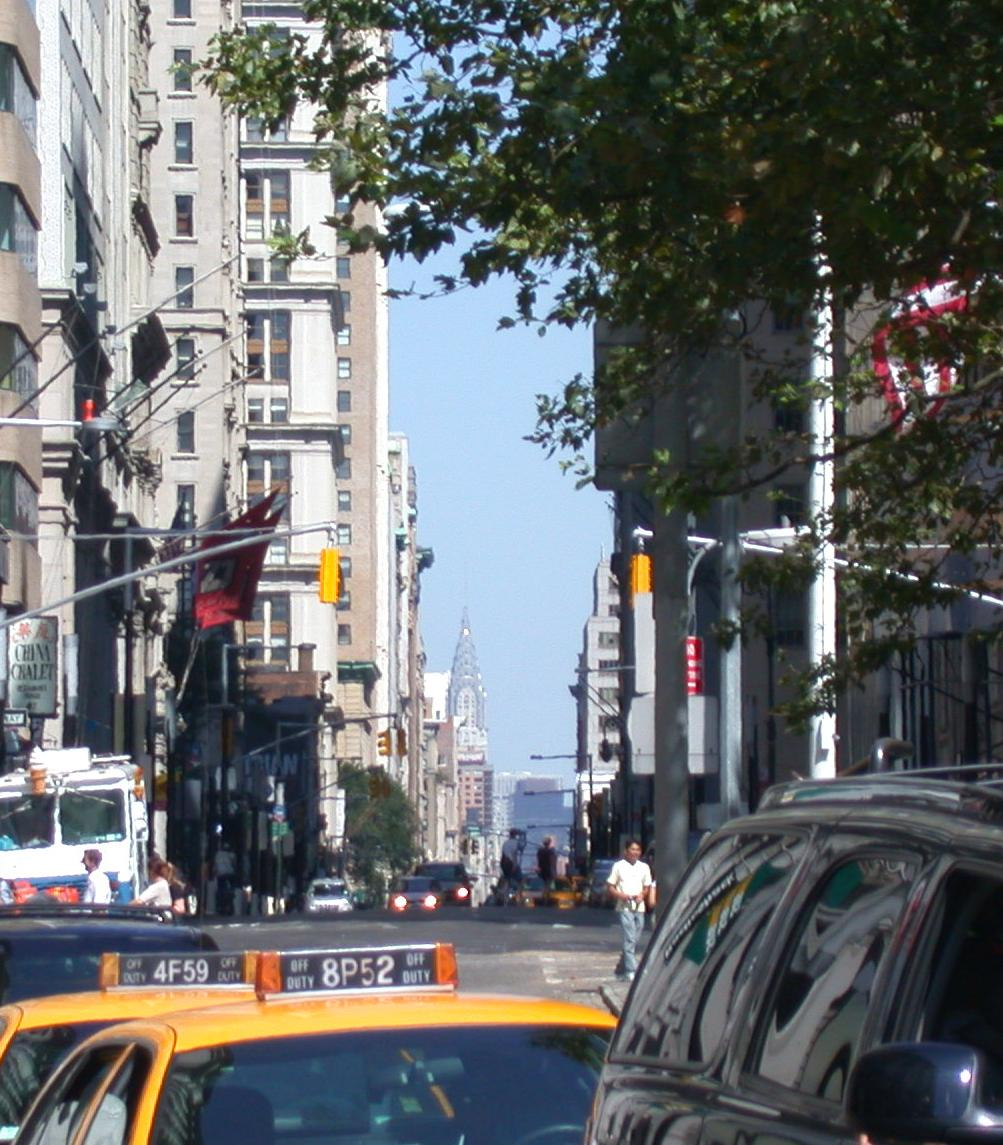
A view of Broadway from Bowling Green with the Chrysler Building in the far background

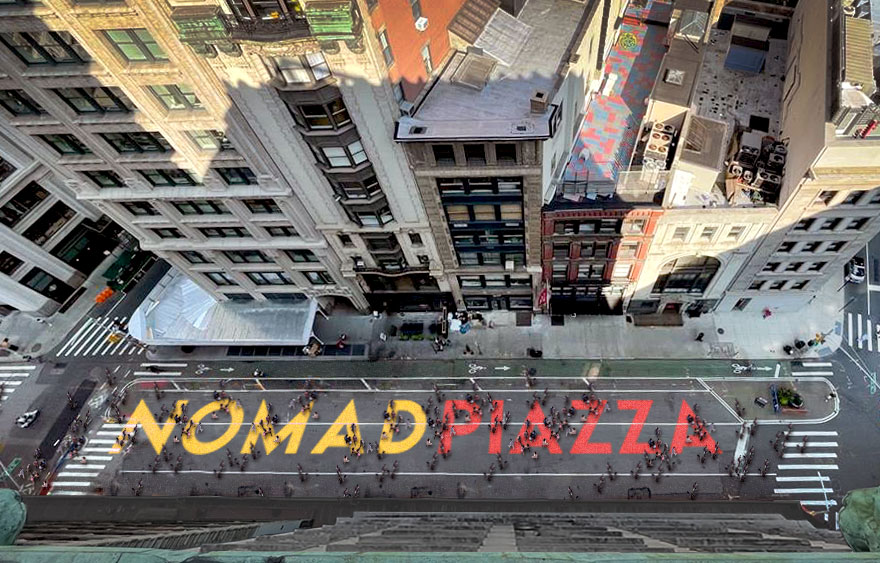
Aerial view of "NoMad Piazza", an Open Street on Broadway in NoMad, Manhattan

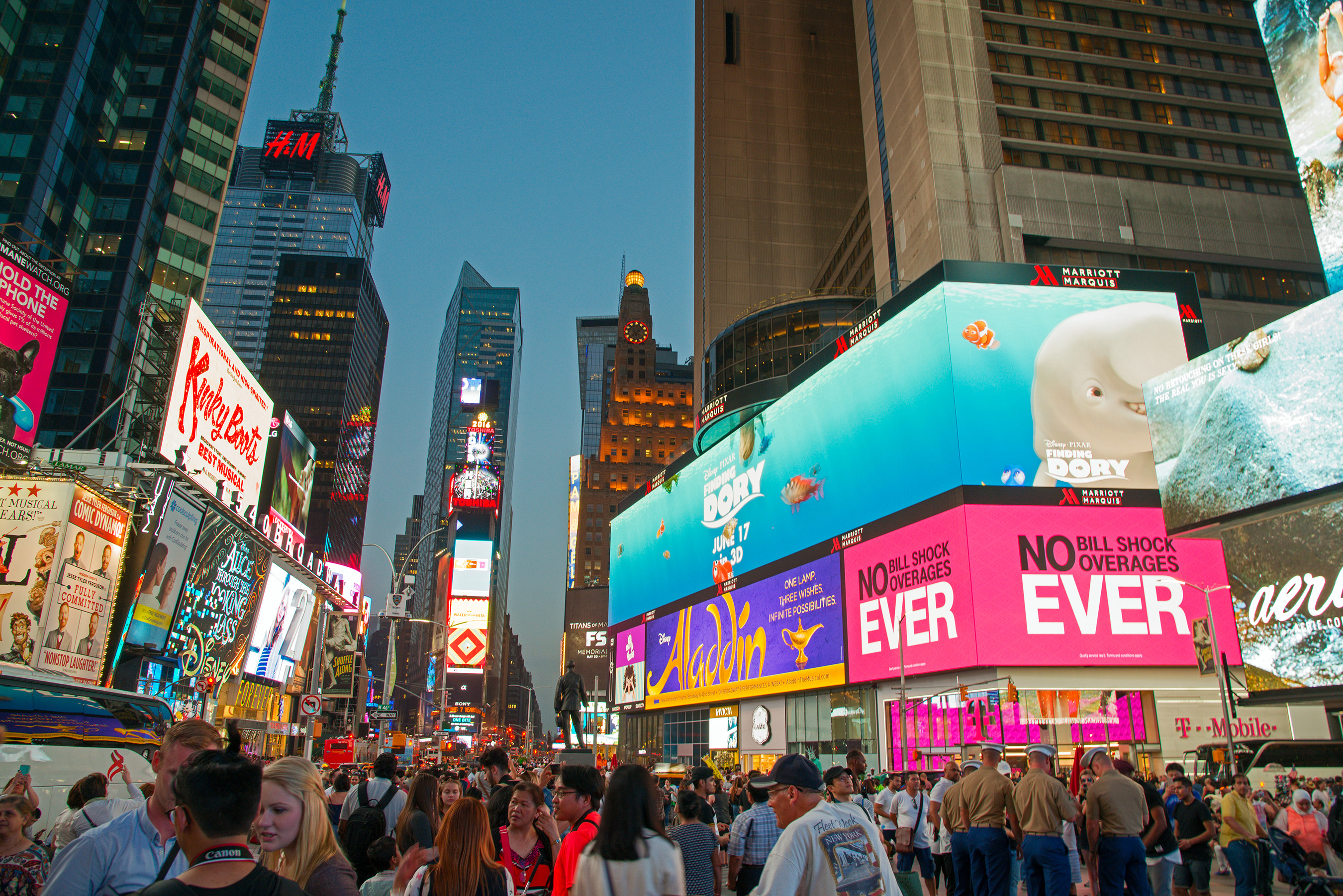
The segment of Broadway in Times Square in Midtown Manhattan

Because Broadway preceded the grid that the Commissioners' Plan of 1811 imposed on the island, Broadway crosses midtown Manhattan diagonally, intersecting with both the east–west streets and north–south avenues. Broadway's intersections with avenues, marked by "squares" (some merely triangular slivers of open space), have induced some interesting architecture, such as the Flatiron Building.

At Union Square, Broadway crosses 14th Street, merges with Fourth Avenue, and continues its diagonal uptown course from the Square's northwest corner; Union Square is the only location wherein the physical section of Broadway is discontinuous in Manhattan (other portions of Broadway in Manhattan are pedestrian-only plazas). At Madison Square, the location of the Flatiron Building, Broadway crosses Fifth Avenue at 23rd Street, thereby moving from the east side of Manhattan to the west, and is discontinuous to vehicles for a one-block stretch between 24th and 25th Streets. At Greeley Square (West 32nd Street), Broadway crosses Sixth Avenue (Avenue of the Americas), and is discontinuous to vehicles until West 35th Street. Macy's Herald Square department store, one block north of the vehicular discontinuity, is located on the northwest corner of Broadway and West 34th Street and southwest corner of Broadway and West 35th Street; it is one of the largest department stores in the world.

One famous stretch near Times Square, where Broadway crosses Seventh Avenue in midtown Manhattan, is the home of many Broadway theatres, housing an ever-changing array of commercial, large-scale plays, particularly musicals. This area of Manhattan is often called the Theater District or the Great White Way, a nickname originating in the headline "Found on the Great White Way" in the February 3, 1902, edition of the New York Evening Telegram. The journalistic nickname was inspired by the millions of lights on theater marquees and billboard advertisements that illuminate the area. After becoming the city's de facto red-light district in the 1960s and 1970s (as can be seen in the films Taxi Driver and Midnight Cowboy), since the late 1980s Times Square has emerged as a family tourist center, in effect being Disneyfied following the company's purchase and renovation of the New Amsterdam Theatre on 42nd Street in 1993.

The New York Times, from which the Square gets its name, was published at offices at 239 West 43rd Street; the paper stopped printing papers there on June 15, 2007.

=== Upper West Side ===
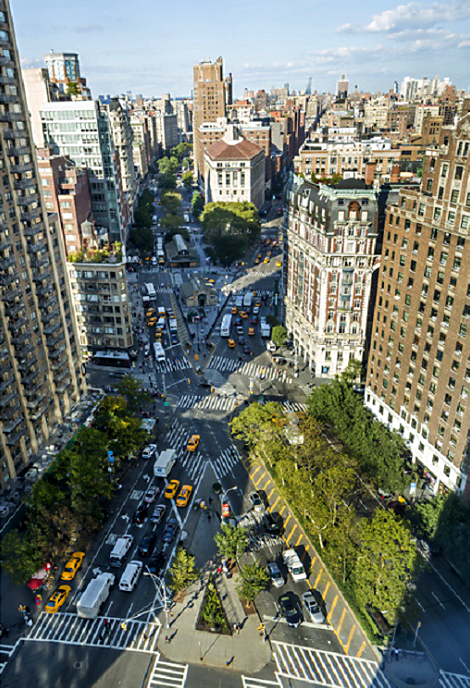
The X-shaped intersection of Broadway (from lower right to upper left) and Amsterdam Avenue (lower left to upper right), looking north from Sherman Square to West 72nd Street, and the treetops of Verdi Square

At the southwest corner of Central Park, Broadway crosses Eighth Avenue (called Central Park West north of 59th Street) at West 59th Street and Columbus Circle; on the site of the former New York Coliseum convention center is the new shopping center at the foot of the Time Warner Center, headquarters of Time Warner. From Columbus Circle northward, Broadway becomes a wide boulevard to 169th Street; it retains landscaped center islands that separate northbound from southbound traffic. The medians are a vestige of the central mall of "The Boulevard" that had become the spine of the Upper West Side, and many of these contain public seating.

Broadway intersects with Columbus Avenue (known as Ninth Avenue south of West 59th Street) at West 65th and 66th Streets where the Juilliard School and Lincoln Center, both well-known performing arts landmarks, as well as the Manhattan New York Temple of the Church of Jesus Christ of Latter-day Saints are located.

Between West 70th and 73rd Streets, Broadway intersects with Amsterdam Avenue (known as 10th Avenue south of West 59th Street). The wide intersection of the two thoroughfares has historically been the site of numerous traffic accidents and pedestrian casualties, partly due to the long crosswalks. Two small triangular plots of land were created at points where Broadway slices through Amsterdam Avenue. One is a tiny fenced-in patch of shrubbery and plants at West 70th Street called Sherman Square (although it and the surrounding intersection have also been known collectively as Sherman Square), and the other triangle is a lush tree-filled garden bordering Amsterdam Avenue from just above West 72nd Street to West 73rd Street. Named Verdi Square in 1921 for its monument to Italian composer Giuseppe Verdi, which was erected in 1909, this triangular sliver of public space was designated a Scenic Landmark by the Landmarks Preservation Commission in 1974, one of nine city parks that have received the designation. In the 1960s and 1970s, the area surrounding both Verdi Square and Sherman Square was known by local drug users and dealers as "Needle Park", and was featured prominently in the gritty 1971 dramatic film The Panic in Needle Park, directed by Jerry Schatzberg and starring Al Pacino in his second onscreen role.

The original brick and stone shelter leading to the entrance of the 72nd Street subway station, one of the first 28 subway stations in Manhattan, remains located on one of the wide islands in the center of Broadway, on the south side of West 72nd Street. For many years, all traffic on Broadway flowed on either side of this median and its subway entrance, and its uptown lanes went past it along the western edge of triangular Verdi Square. In 2001 and 2002, renovation of the historic 72nd Street station and the addition of a second subway control house and passenger shelter on an adjacent center median just north of 72nd Street, across from the original building, resulted in the creation of a public plaza with stone pavers and extensive seating, connecting the newer building with Verdi Square, and making it necessary to divert northbound traffic to Amsterdam Avenue for one block. While Broadway's southbound lanes at this intersection were unaffected by the new construction, its northbound lanes are no longer contiguous at this intersection. Drivers can either continue along Amsterdam Avenue to head uptown or turn left on West 73rd Street to resume traveling on Broadway.

Several notable apartment buildings are in close proximity to this intersection, including The Ansonia, its ornate architecture dominating the cityscape here. After the Ansonia first opened as a hotel, live seals were kept in indoor fountains inside its lobby. Later, it was home to the infamous Plato's Retreat nightclub. Immediately north of Verdi Square is the Apple Bank Building, formerly the Central Savings Bank, which was built in 1926 and designed to resemble the Federal Reserve Bank of New York. Broadway is also home to the Beacon Theatre at West 74th Street, designated a national landmark in 1979 and still in operation as a concert venue after its establishment in 1929 as a vaudeville and music hall, and "sister" venue to Radio City Music Hall.

At its intersection with West 78th Street, Broadway shifts direction and continues directly uptown and aligned approximately with the Commissioners' grid. Past the bend are the historic Apthorp apartment building, built in 1908, and the First Baptist Church in the City of New York, incorporated in New York in 1762, its current building on Broadway erected in 1891. The road heads north and passes historically important apartment houses such as the Belnord, the Astor Court Building, and the Art Nouveau Cornwall.

At Broadway and 95th Street is Symphony Space, established in 1978 as home to avant-garde and classical music and dance performances in the former Symphony Theatre, which was originally built in 1918 as a premier "music and motion-picture house". At 99th Street, Broadway passes between the controversial skyscrapers of the Ariel East and West.

At 107th Street, Broadway merges with West End Avenue, with the intersection forming Straus Park with its Titanic Memorial by Augustus Lukeman.

=== Northern Manhattan and the Bronx ===
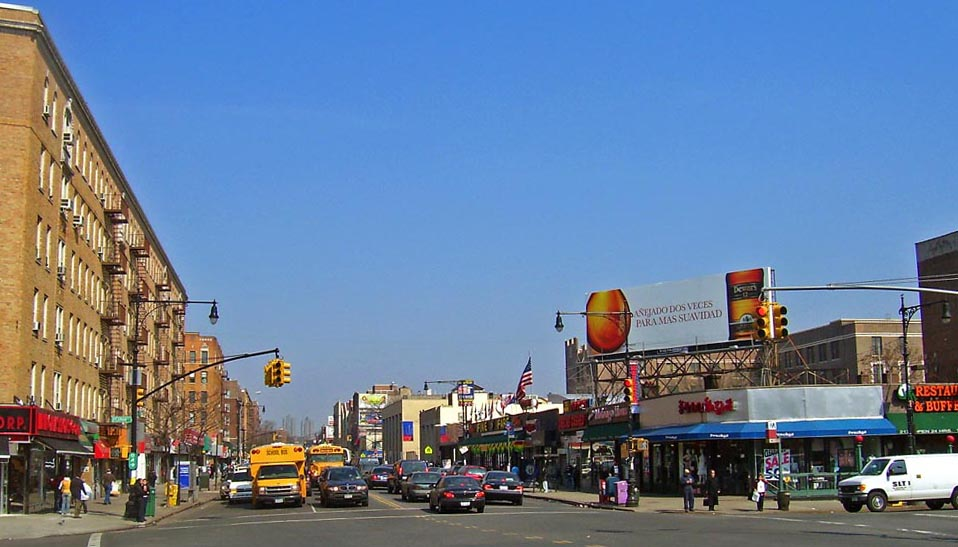
Broadway at Dyckman Street in Inwood

Broadway then passes the campus of Columbia University at 116th Street in Morningside Heights, in part on the tract that housed the Bloomingdale Insane Asylum from 1808 until it moved to Westchester County in 1894. Still in Morningside Heights, Broadway passes the park-like campus of Barnard College. Next, the Gothic quadrangle of Union Theological Seminary, and the brick buildings of the Jewish Theological Seminary of America with their landscaped interior courtyards, face one another across Broadway. On the next block is the Manhattan School of Music.

Broadway then runs past the Manhattanville campus of Columbia University, and the main campus of CUNY–City College near 135th Street; the Gothic buildings of the original City College campus are out of sight, a block to the east. Also to the east are the brownstones of Hamilton Heights. Hamilton Place is a surviving section of Bloomingdale Road, and originally the address of Alexander Hamilton's house, The Grange, which has been moved.

Broadway achieves a verdant, park-like effect, particularly in the spring, when it runs between the uptown Trinity Church Cemetery and the former Trinity Chapel, now the Church of the Intercession near 155th Street.

NewYork–Presbyterian Hospital lies on Broadway near 166th, 167th, and 168th Streets in Washington Heights. The intersection with St. Nicholas Avenue at 167th Street forms Mitchell Square Park. At 178th Street, US 9 becomes concurrent with Broadway.

Broadway crosses the Harlem River on the Broadway Bridge to Marble Hill. Afterward, it then enters the Bronx, where it is the eastern border of Riverdale and the western border of Van Cortlandt Park. At 253rd Street, NY 9A joins with US 9 and Broadway. (NY 9A splits off Broadway at Ashburton Avenue in Yonkers.)

=== Westchester County ===
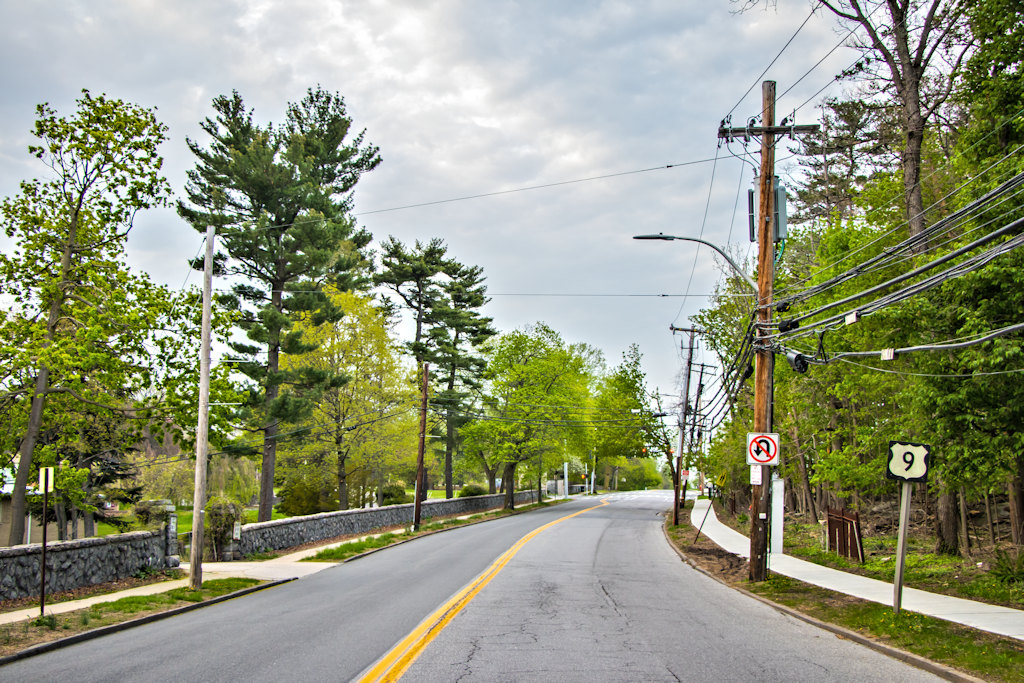
North Broadway (U.S. 9) in Yonkers

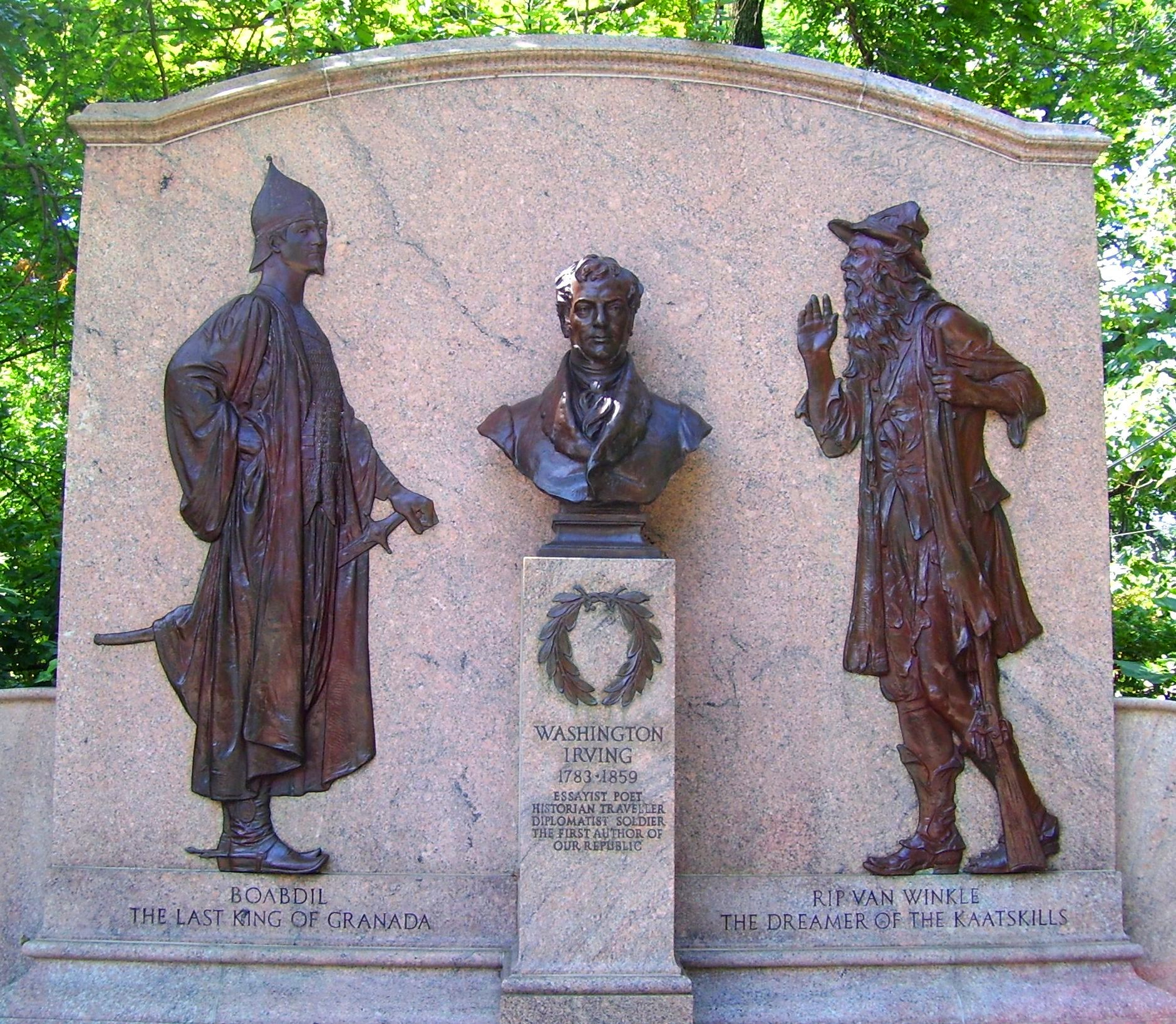
Washington Irving Memorial on North Broadway in Irvington, not far from Washington Irving's home in Sunnyside

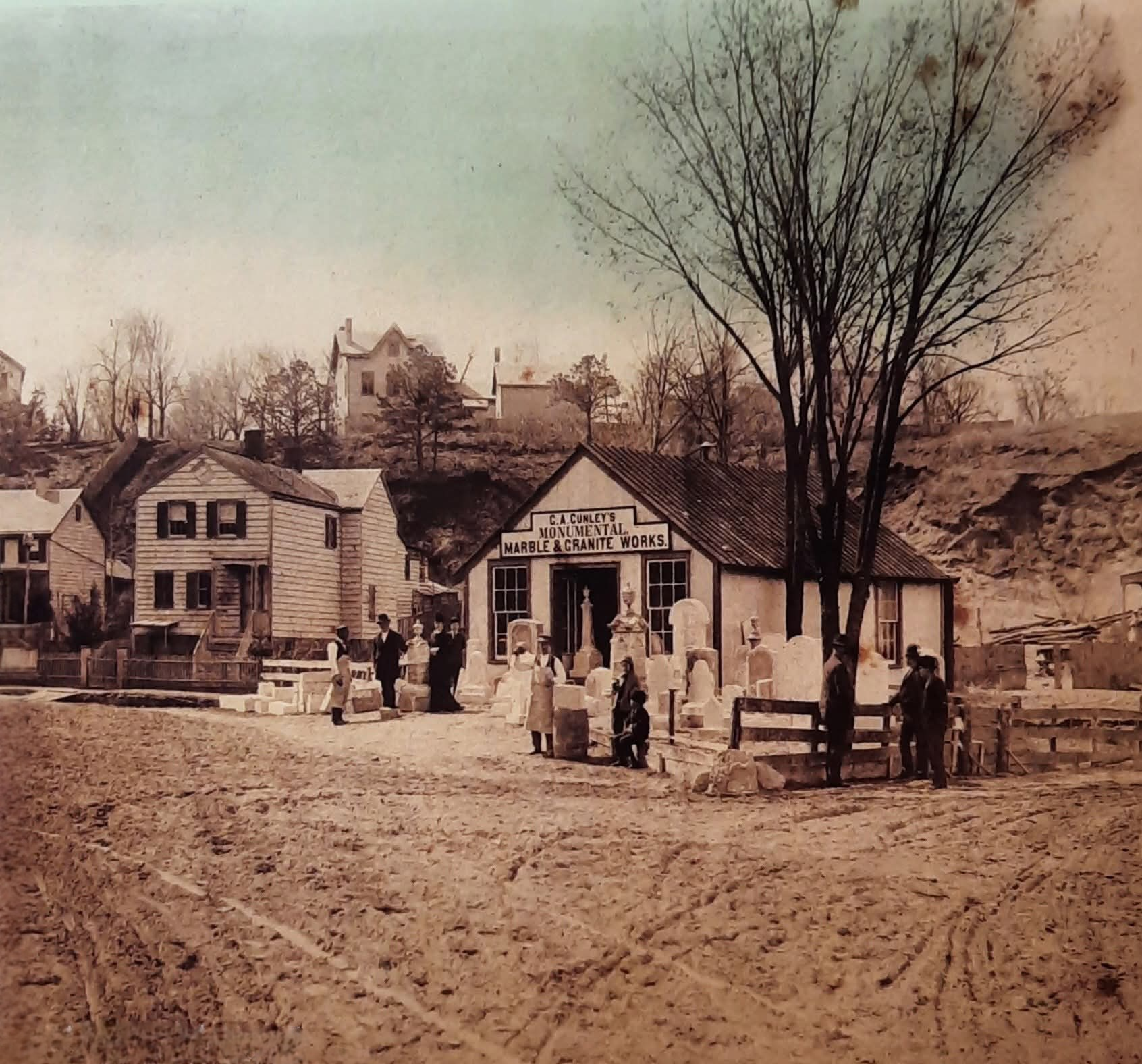
Northernmost section of Broadway in North Tarrytown (now Sleepy Hollow) at the turn of the 20th century, before the road was improved with macadam surfacing

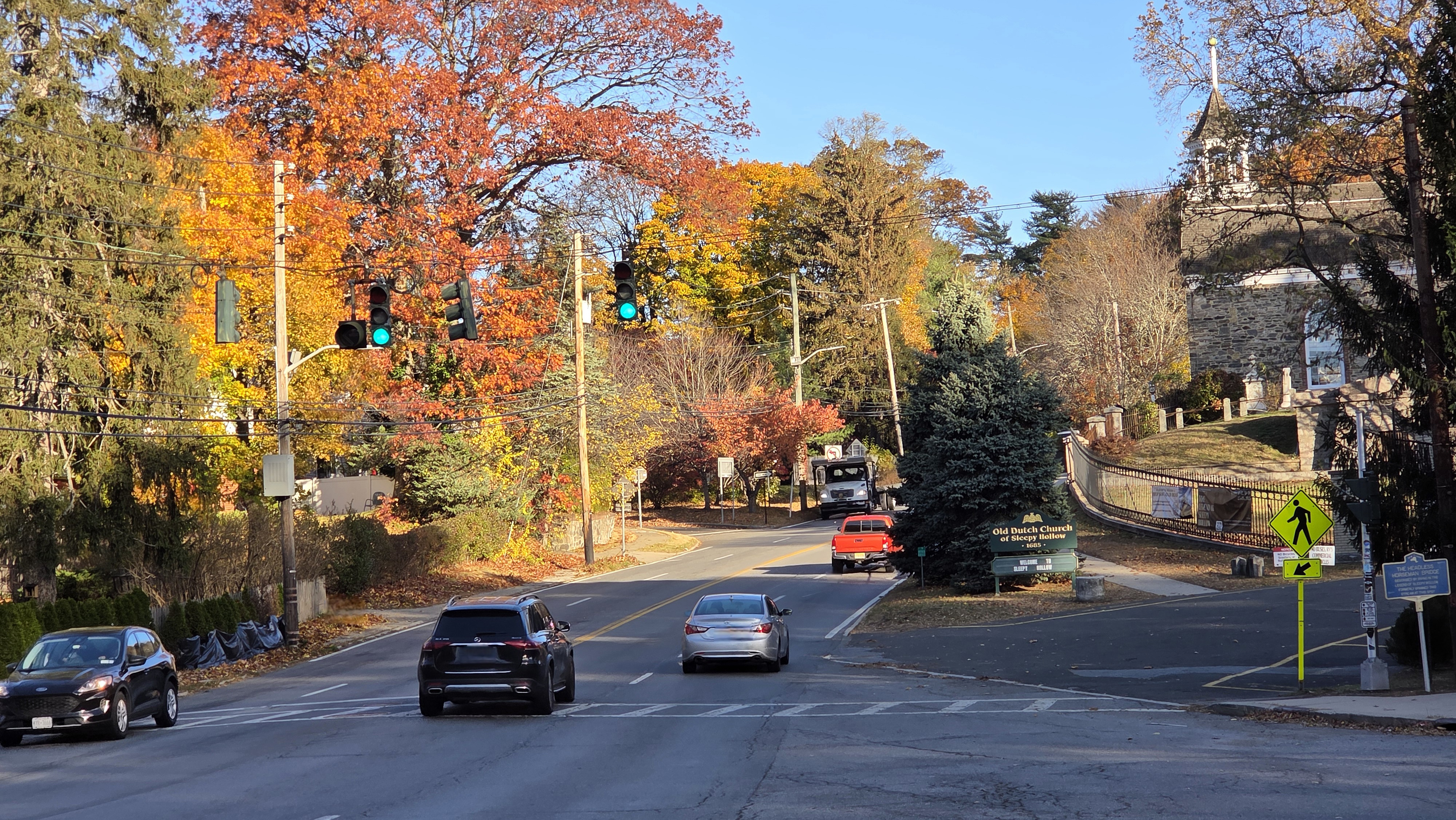
View of Broadway in 2025, near the Old Dutch Church of Sleepy Hollow, less than one mile from where Broadway ends

The northwestern corner of the park marks the New York City limit and Broadway enters Westchester County in Yonkers, where it is now known as South Broadway. It trends ever westward, closer to the Hudson River, remaining a busy urban commercial street. In downtown Yonkers, it drops close to the river, becomes North Broadway and 9A leaves via Ashburton Avenue. Broadway climbs to the nearby ridgetop runs parallel to the river and the railroad, a few blocks east of both as it passes St. John's Riverside Hospital. The neighborhoods become more residential and the road gently undulates along the ridgetop. In Yonkers, Broadway passes the historic Philipse Manor Hall, which dates back to colonial times.

It remains Broadway as it leaves Yonkers for Hastings-on-Hudson, where it splits into separate north and south routes for 0.6 miles (1.0 km). The trees become taller and the houses, many separated from the road by stone fences, become larger. Another National Historic Landmark, the John William Draper House, was the site of the first astrophotograph of the Moon.

In the next village, Dobbs Ferry, Broadway has various views of the Hudson River while passing through the residential section. Broadway passes by the Old Croton Aqueduct and nearby the shopping district of the village. After intersecting with Ashford Avenue, then Broadway turns left again at the center of town just past South Presbyterian Church, passes Mercy University, headed for equally comfortable Ardsley-on-Hudson and Irvington. Villa Lewaro, the home of Madam C. J. Walker, the first African-American millionaire, is along the highway here. At the north end of the village of Irvington, a memorial to writer Washington Irving, after whom the village was renamed, marks the turnoff to his home at Sunnyside. Entering into the southern portion of Tarrytown, Broadway passes by the historic Lyndhurst estate with a mansion built along the Hudson River in the early 1800s.

North of here, at Montefiore Medical Center, the Tappan Zee Bridge becomes visible. After crossing under the Thruway and I-87 again, here concurrent with I-287, and then intersecting with the four-lane NY 119, where 119 splits off to the east, Broadway becomes the busy main thoroughfare of Tarrytown. Christ Episcopal Church, where Irving worshiped, is along the street, as are several other historic churches. Many high-quality restaurants and shops are also lined along this part of the road, whose section to the north of Tarrytown's Main Street is called North Broadway.

Tarrytown ends at Patriot's Park, where the village of Sleepy Hollow begins. At the eastern terminus of NY 448, Broadway slopes off to the left, downhill, to pass the visitors' center for Philipsburg Manor House. Broadway then crosses a road bridge and then passes the Old Dutch Church of Sleepy Hollow and the historic Sleepy Hollow Cemetery which includes the resting place of Washington Irving and, at the churchyard, the setting for "The Legend of Sleepy Hollow".

Broadway expands to four lanes at the trumpet intersection with NY 117, where it finally ends and U.S. 9 becomes Albany Post Road (and Highland Avenue) at the northern border of Sleepy Hollow, New York.

=== Nicknamed sections ===
==== Canyon of Heroes ====
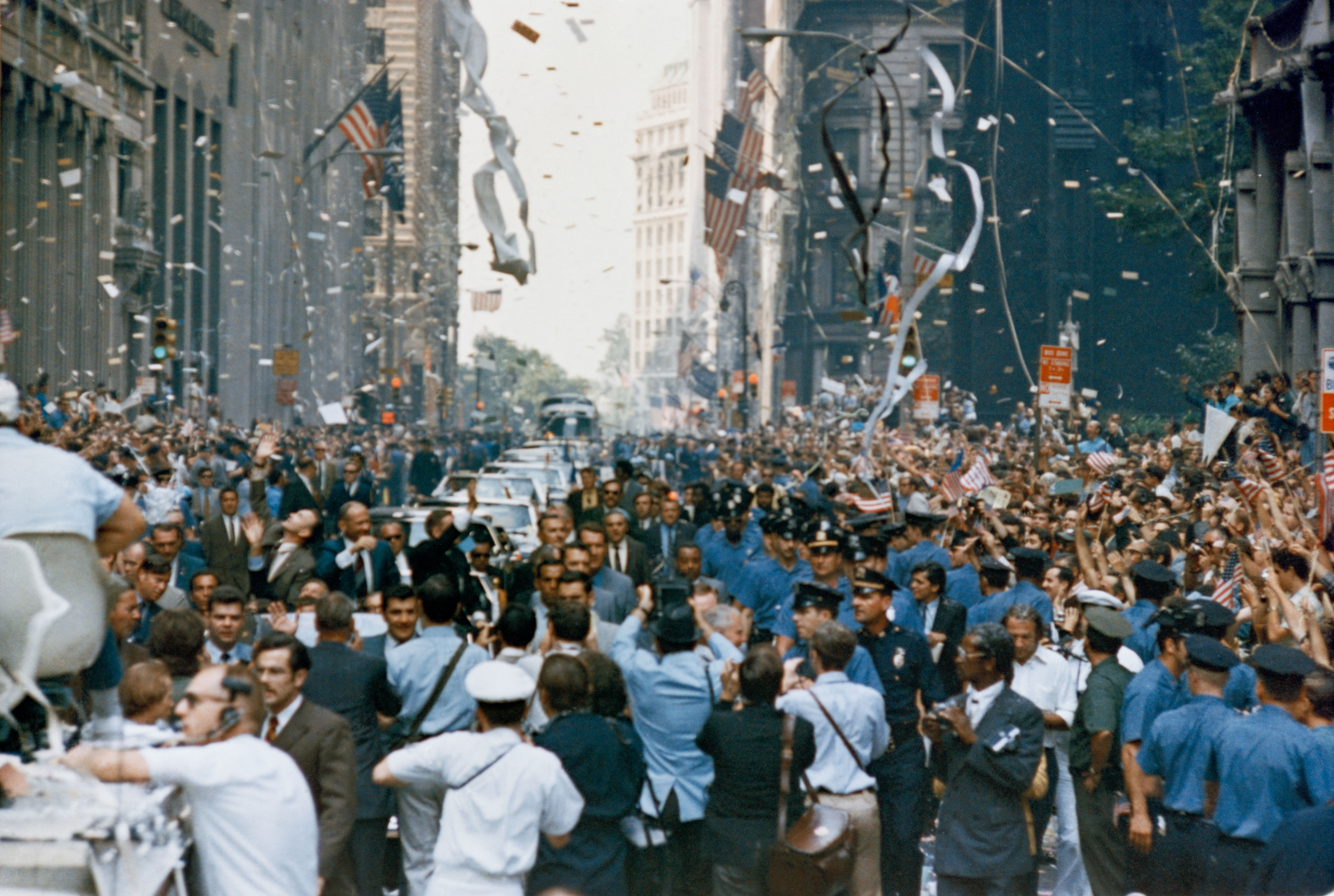
Canyon of Heroes during the 1969 ticker-tape parade for the Apollo 11

Canyon of Heroes is occasionally used to refer to the section of lower Broadway in the Financial District that is the location of the city's ticker-tape parades. The traditional route of the parade is northward from Bowling Green to City Hall Park. Most of the route is lined with tall office buildings along both sides, affording a view of the parade for thousands of office workers who create the snowstorm-like jettison of shredded paper products that characterize the parade.

While typical sports championship parades have been showered with some 50 tons of confetti and shredded paper, the V-J Day parade on August 14–15, 1945 – marking the end of World War II – was covered with 5,438 tons of paper, based on estimates provided by the New York City Department of Sanitation.

More than 200 black granite strips embedded in the sidewalks along the Canyon of Heroes list honorees of past ticker-tape parades.

==== Great White Way ====
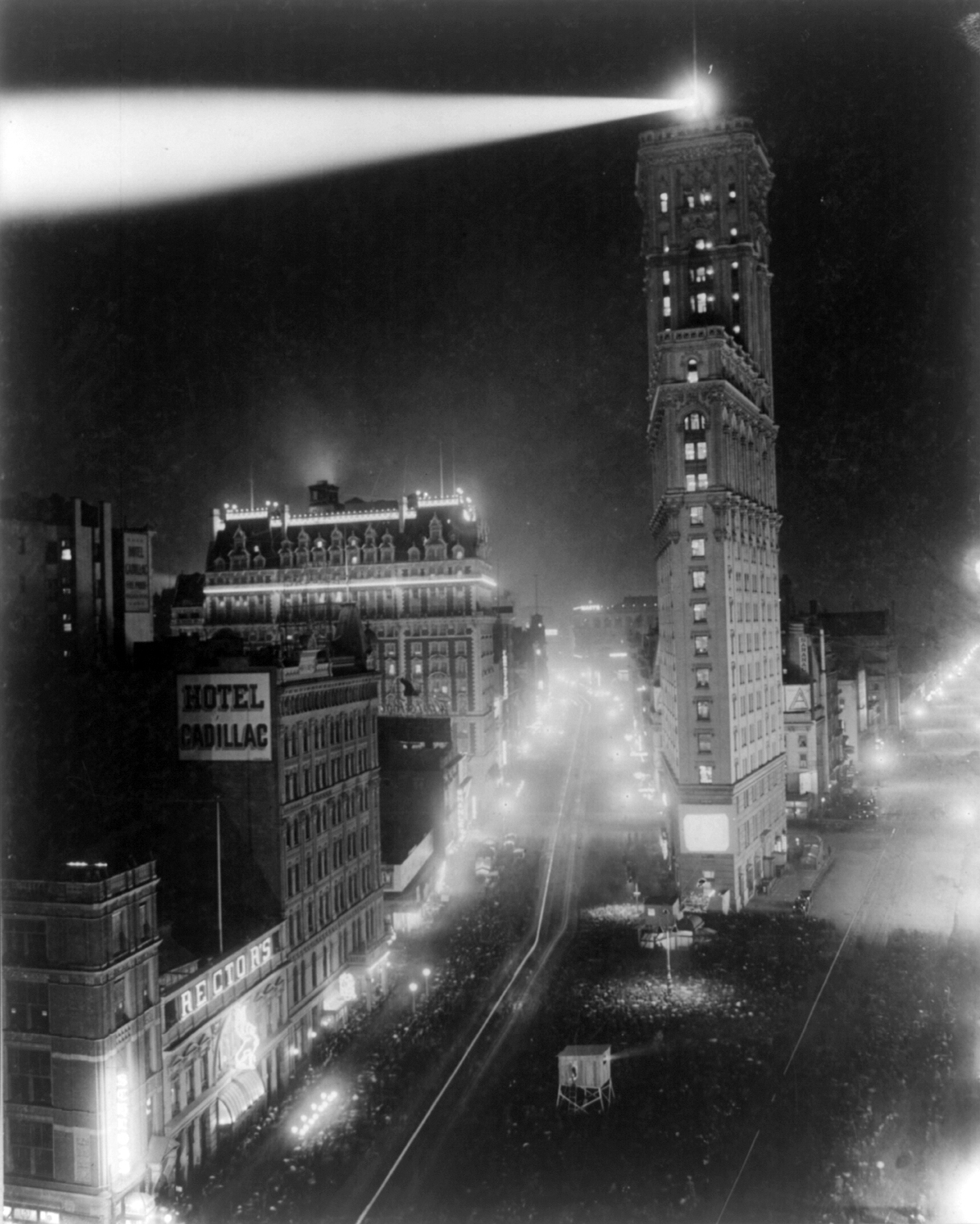
The Great White Way: Broadway south from 42nd street (1908)

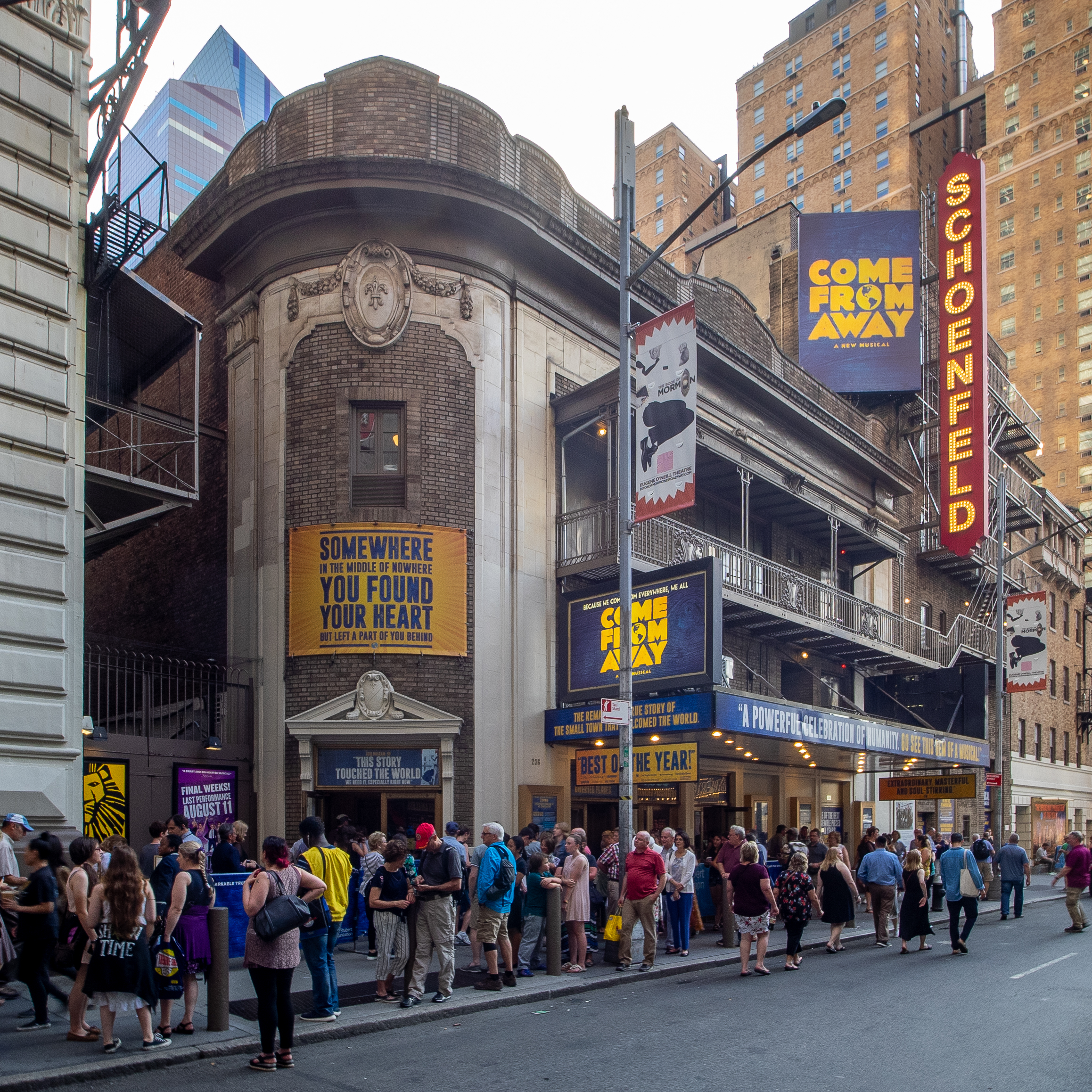
Schoenfeld Theater on the south side of 45th Street (2017)

In 1880, a stretch of Broadway between Union Square and Madison Square was illuminated by Brush arc lamps, making it among the first electrically lighted streets in the United States. By the 1890s, the portion from 23rd Street to 34th Street was so brightly illuminated by electrical advertising signs that people began calling it "The Great White Way". When the theater district moved uptown, the name was transferred to the Times Square area. Since then "The Great White Way" became a nickname for a section of Broadway in Midtown Manhattan, particularly the portion that encompasses the Theater District, between 42nd and 53rd Streets, and encompassing Times Square.

The phrase "Great White Way" has been attributed to Shep Friedman, columnist for the New York Morning Telegraph in 1901, who lifted the term from the title of a book about the Arctic by Albert Paine. The headline "Found on the Great White Way" appeared in the February 3, 1902, edition of the New York Evening Telegram.

A portrait of Broadway in the early part of the 20th century and "The Great White Way" late at night appeared in "Artist In Manhattan" (1940) written by the artist–historian Jerome Myers:

Early morn on Broadway, the same light that tips the mountain tops of the Colorado canyons gradually discloses the quiet anatomy, the bare skeletons of the huge iron signs that trellis the sky, now denuded of the attractions of the volcanic night. Almost lifeless, the tired entertainers of the night clubs and their friends straggle to their rooms, taximen compare notes and earnings, the vast street scene has had its curtain call, the play is over.

Dear old Broadway, for many years have I dwelt on your borders. I have known the quiet note of your dawn. Even earlier I would take my coffee at Martin's, at 54th Street–now, alas, vanished–where I would see creatures of the night life before they disappeared with the dawn.

One night a celebrated female impersonator came to the restaurant in all his regalia, directly from a club across the street. Several taximen began to poke fun at him. Unable any longer to bear their taunts, he got up and knocked all the taximen out cold. Then he went back to the club, only to lament under his bitter tears, "See how they've ruined my dress!"

Gone are the old-time Broadway oyster bars and chop houses that were the survivors of a tradition of their sporting patrons, the bon vivants of Manhattan. Gone are the days when the Hoffman House flourished on Madison Square, with its famous nudes by Bouguereau; when barrooms were palaces, on nearly every corner throughout the city; when Steve Brodie, jumping from Brooklyn Bridge, splashed the entire country with publicity; when Bowery concert halls dispensed schooners of beer for a nickel, with a stage show thrown in; when Theis's Music Hall still resounded on 14th Street with its great mechanical organ, the wonder of its day, a place of beauty, with fine paintings and free company and the frankest of female life. Across the street was Tammany Hall, and next to it Tony Pastor's, where stars of the stage were born. Tony himself, in dress clothes and top hat, sang his ballads, a gallant trouper introducing Lillian Russell and others to fame through his audience.

=== Millionaires' Row ===
During the Gilded Age, the northernmost stretch of Broadway in Westchester County, between Irvington and Mount Pleasant (called South Broadway between Irvington and Tarrytown), was known as "Millionaires' Row." It was lined on both sides by estates and country houses of wealthy industrialists, merchants, and financiers. Some of them still stand, including Lyndhurst, Villa Lewaro, Woodlea (now Sleepy Hollow Country Club), Carrollcliffe, Edward Harden Mansion, and Kykuit. Some are gone, including Greystone and Rockwood Hall. With Broadway providing easy commuting into Manhattan, Millionaires' Row was among the "choiciest" summer retreat locations for affluent New Yorkers in the New York metropolitan area.

== Transportation ==
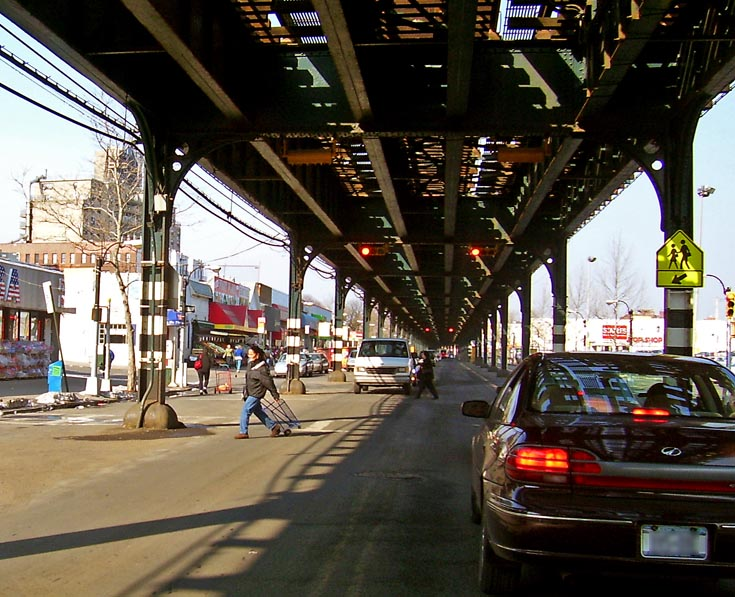
Broadway under the IRT Broadway–Seventh Avenue Line's elevated structure in The Bronx

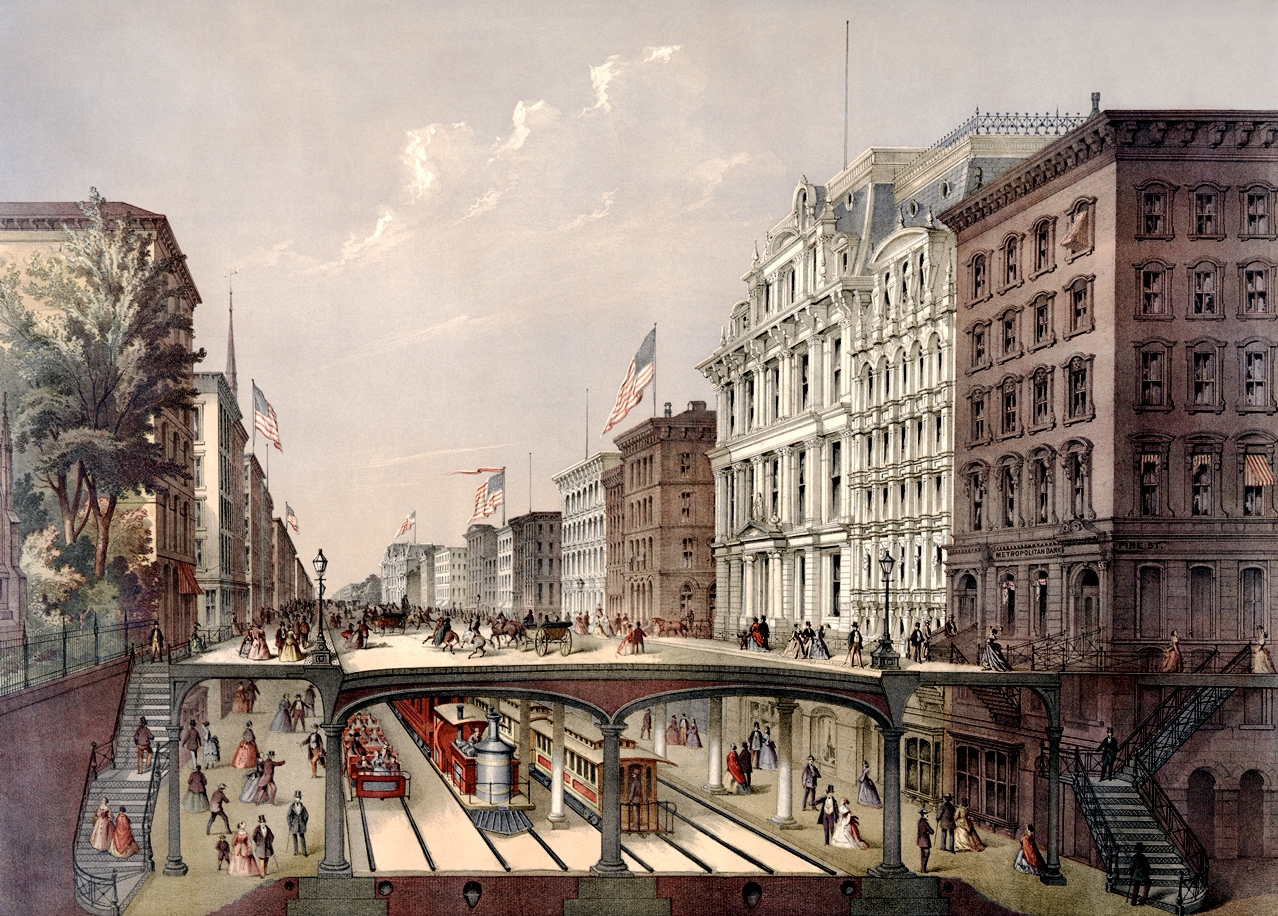
An 1868 plan for an arcade railway

From south to north, Broadway at one point or another runs over or under various New York City Subway lines, including the IRT Lexington Avenue Line, the BMT Broadway Line, IRT Broadway–Seventh Avenue Line, and IND Eighth Avenue Line (the IND Sixth Avenue Line is the only north–south trunk line in Manhattan that does not run along Broadway).

- The IRT Lexington Avenue Line runs under Broadway from Bowling Green to Fulton Street (4 and 5 trains).
- The BMT Broadway Line runs under it from City Hall to Times Square–42nd Street (N, Q, R, and W trains).
- The IRT Broadway–Seventh Avenue Line runs under and over Broadway from Times Square to 168th Street (1, 2, and 3 trains), and again from 218th Street to its terminal in the Bronx at Van Cortlandt Park–242nd Street (1 train).
- The northern portion of the IND Eighth Avenue Line runs under Broadway from Dyckman Street to Inwood–207th Street (A train).

Early street railways on Broadway included the Broadway and Seventh Avenue Railroad's Broadway and University Place Line (1864?) between Union Square (14th Street) and Times Square (42nd Street), the Ninth Avenue Railroad's Ninth and Amsterdam Avenues Line (1884) between 65th Street and 71st Street, the Forty-second Street, Manhattanville and St. Nicholas Avenue Railway's Broadway Branch Line (1885?) between Times Square and 125th Street, and the Kingsbridge Railway's Kingsbridge Line north of 169th Street. The Broadway Surface Railroad's Broadway Line, a cable car line, opened on lower Broadway (below Times Square) in 1893, and soon became the core of the Metropolitan Street Railway, with two cable branches: the Broadway and Lexington Avenue Line and Broadway and Columbus Avenue Line.

These streetcar lines were replaced with bus routes in the 1930s and 1940s. Before Broadway became one-way, the main bus routes along it were the New York City Omnibus Company's (NYCO) 6 (Broadway below Times Square), 7 (Broadway and Columbus Avenue), and 11 (Ninth and Amsterdam Avenues), and the Surface Transportation Corporation's M100 (Kingsbridge) and M104 (Broadway Branch). Additionally, the Fifth Avenue Coach Company's (FACCo) 4 and 5 used Broadway from 135th Street north to Washington Heights, and their 5 and 6 used Broadway between 57th Street and 72nd Street. With the implementation of one-way traffic, the northbound 6 and 7 were moved to Sixth Avenue.

As of 2017, Broadway is served by:

- The M4 (ex-FACCo 4) between Cathedral Parkway and West 165th Street uptown or Fort Washington Avenue downtown.
- The M7 (ex-NYCO 7) between Amsterdam Avenue and Columbus Circle.
- The downtown M55 south of East 8th Street.
- The M100 between Dyckman Street and Saint Nicholas Avenue, and uptown from 10th to 9th Avenues.
- The M104 between Dr. Martin Luther King Jr. Boulevard and Columbus Circle, with uptown service absent from Amsterdam Avenue to West 73rd Street.

Other routes that use part of Broadway include:

- The downtown M1 from East 8th to Grand Streets when running the full route.
- The M5 (ex-FACCo 5) between West 72nd Street and Columbus Circle and between West 135th and West 178th uptown or West 179th Streets downtown.
- The M9 between Park Row and Barclay Street downtown or Warren Street uptown.
- The downtown M10 from West 63rd to West 57th Streets, where it terminates.
- The downtown M12 from West 58th to West 57th Streets.
- The M20 from West 66th Street to Columbus Circle, while out of service from West 64th to West 63rd Streets.
- The eastbound M22 from Chambers Street to Park Row.
- The M57 looping around at West 72nd Street.
- The M60 Select Bus Service between West 120th Street and West End Avenue downtown or West 106th Street uptown.
- The westbound M86 SBS from West 86th to West 87th Streets.
- The westbound M96 and M106 from West 96th to West 97th Streets.
- The M116 looping around at West 116th Street.
- The eastbound Bx3, Bx11, Bx35 and Bx36 from West 178th to West 181st Streets, joining the Bx13 at West 179th Street.
- The Bx6 and Bx6 SBS between West 155th & West 157th Streets uptown or Edward M. Morgan Place downtown.
- The Bx7 from Saint Nicholas Avenue to West 231st Street uptown, and from West 230th to West 166th Streets downtown.
- The Bx9 between West 225th and West 262nd Streets, where it terminates.
- The Bx12 and Bx12 SBS from West 207th to Isham Streets, going out of service between stops.
- The Bx20 between West 207th and West 231st uptown or West 230th Streets downtown, with said direction continuing out of service to West 204th Street.

Express service is provided by the BxM1 between Dyckman Street in Manhattan and West 230th Street in the Bronx, and the BxM3 between Van Cortlandt Park South in the Bronx and Main Street in Yonkers, using South Broadway to terminate.

Bee-Line buses also serve Broadway within Riverdale and Westchester County. Routes 1, 2, 3, 4, 6, 13, and several others run on a portion of Broadway.

== Notable buildings ==
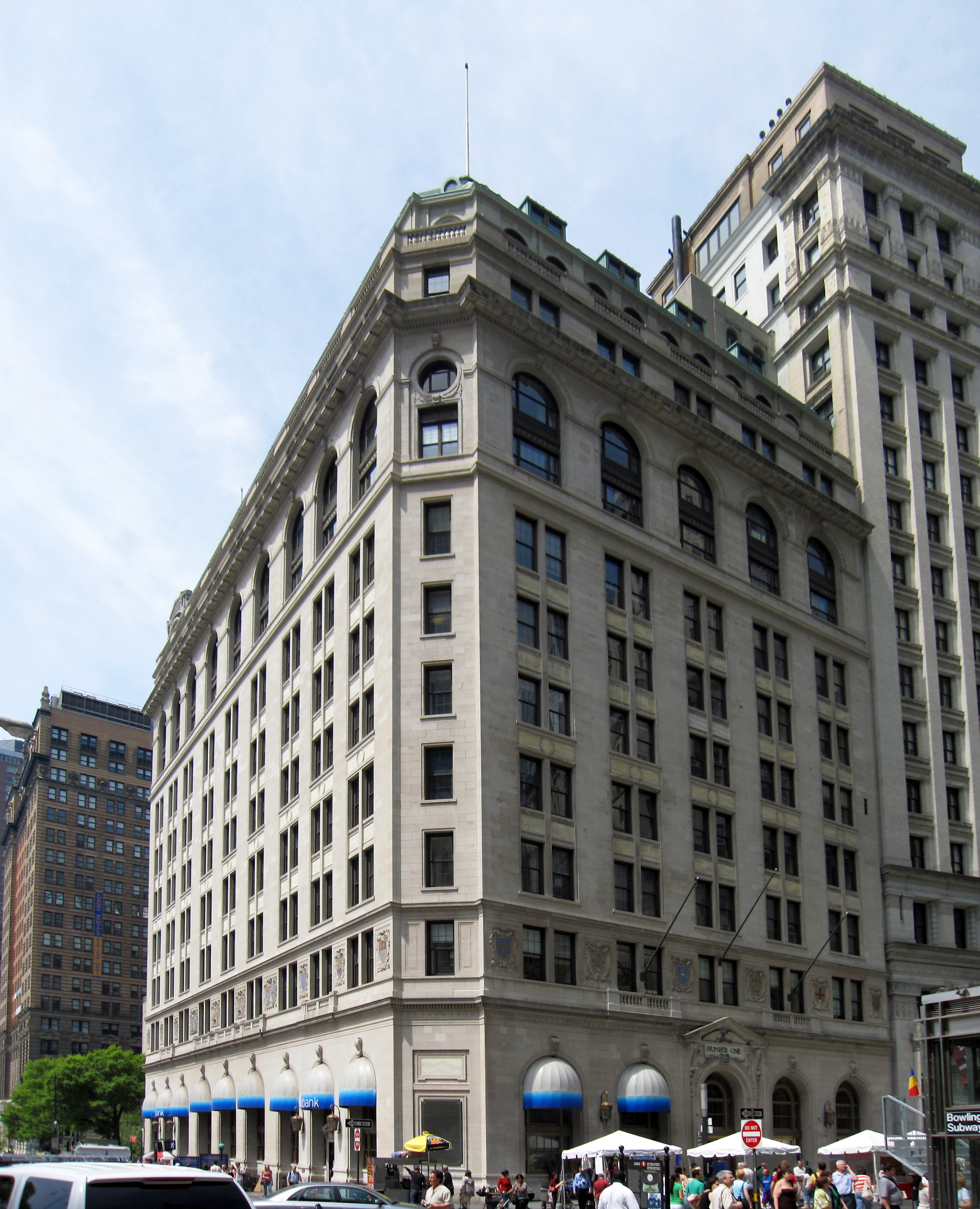
International Mercantile Marine Company Building

Broadway is lined with many famous and otherwise noted and historic buildings, such as:

- 2 Broadway
- 280 Broadway (also known as the Marble Palace, the A.T. Stewart Company Store, or The Sun Building)
- Alexander Hamilton U.S. Custom House (1 Bowling Green, between the two legs of the southern end of Broadway)
- American Surety Building (100 Broadway)
- Ansonia Hotel (2109 Broadway)
- Bowling Green Fence and Park (between 25 and 26 Broadway)
- Bowling Green Offices Building (11 Broadway)
- Brill Building (1619 Broadway)
- Corbin Building (196 Broadway)
- Cunard Building (25 Broadway)
- Dyckman House (4881 Broadway)
- Equitable Building (120 Broadway)
- Flatiron Building (Fifth Avenue and Broadway at 23rd Street)
- Gilsey House (1200 Broadway)
- Gorham Manufacturing Company Building (889-91 Broadway)
- Home Life Building (253, 256 Broadway)
- International Mercantile Marine Company Building (1 Broadway)
- Morgan Stanley Building (1585 Broadway)
- One Times Square (1475 Broadway)
- Paramount Building (1501 Broadway)
- Standard Oil Building (26 Broadway)
- Trinity Church (79 Broadway)
- Union Theological Seminary (3041 Broadway)
- United Palace (4140 Broadway)
- United States Lines-Panama Pacific Lines Building (1 Broadway)
- Winter Garden Theatre (1634 Broadway)
- Woolworth Building (233 Broadway)

Historic buildings on Broadway that are now demolished include:

- Appleton Building
- Alexander Macomb House
- Barnum's American Museum
- Equitable Life Building
- Grand Central Hotel (673 Broadway)
- Mechanics' Hall
- Metropolitan Opera House, from 1883 to 1966, between 39th and 40th Streets
- Singer Tower (Liberty Street and Broadway)
- St. Nicholas Hotel
