= New York State Route 117 =

State highway in Westchester County, New York, US

New York State Route 117
- Map of Westchester County with NY 117 highlighted in red

Route information
- Maintained by NYSDOT
- Length: 15.23 mi (24.51 km)
- Existed: 1930–present

Major junctions
- West end: US 9 / Kendal Way in Mount Pleasant
- NY 9A / NY 100 in Mount Pleasant; Taconic State Parkway in Mount Pleasant; Saw Mill River Parkway in Pleasantville and Bedford
- North end: Saw Mill River Parkway in Bedford

Location
- Country: United States
- State: New York
- Counties: Westchester

Highway system
- New York Highways; Interstate; US; State; Reference; Parkways
← NY 116	→ NY 118

New York State Route 117 (NY 117) is a 15.23-mile (24.51 km) state highway in Westchester County, New York, in the United States. The southern terminus of the route is at an intersection with U.S. Route 9 (US 9) north of the village of Sleepy Hollow. The northern terminus is at an interchange with the Saw Mill River Parkway just south of Interstate 684 (I-684), south of Katonah, a hamlet in the town of Bedford. NY 117 meets the Taconic State Parkway in Pleasantville and parallels the Saw Mill Parkway from Pleasantville to Bedford.

NY 117 was assigned as part of the 1930 renumbering of state highways in New York and originally extended from Tarrytown to Katonah. The Tarrytown–Pleasantville portion of NY 117 passed through Kykuit, the estate of the Rockefeller family. Construction on a new expressway bypassing the estate to the north began in the late 1960s and was completed in November 1970, at which time NY 117 was realigned to follow the highway. Another highway bypassing Katonah was built in the early 1990s and opened c. 1992 as a realignment of NY 117.

== Route description ==
=== Mount Pleasant and Pleasantville ===
NY 117 begins just north of the village of Sleepy Hollow at an interchange with US 9 (Broadway) in the town of Mount Pleasant. The route proceeds generally northeastward along Phelps Way, a four-lane expressway, bypassing Sleepy Hollow and Kykuit, the Rockefeller family's estate. For its first 2 miles (3.2 km), the highway runs through a wooded area along the northern edge of the Rockefeller State Park Preserve, crossing under several of the park's hiking and walking trails. Phelps Way ends at the northeastern tip of the park, where NY 117 intersects with the northern terminus of NY 448 at Bedford Road. While NY 448 ends here, Bedford Road continues on as part of NY 117.

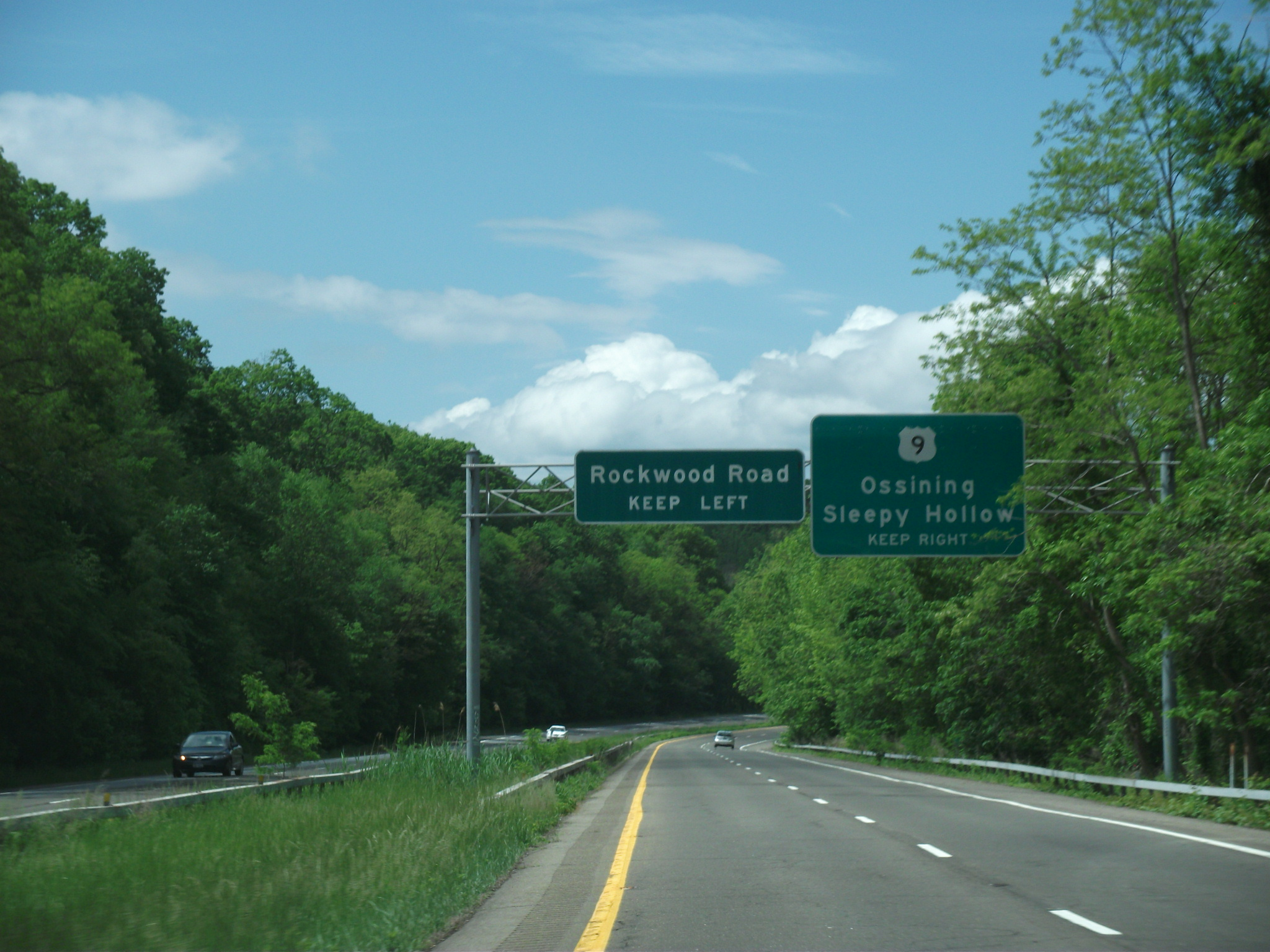
NY 117 westbound approaching its southern terminus at US 9 in Mount Pleasant

After NY 448, NY 117 becomes a four-lane surface road as it heads northeast through a residential area of Mount Pleasant. Just past the NY 448 junction, NY 117 enters adjacent interchanges with Saw Mill River Road (NY 9A and NY 100) and the northbound direction of the Taconic State Parkway near Graham Hills County Park. From here, the highway passes south of Pace University's Pleasantville campus on its way into the village of Pleasantville, where it narrows to two lanes and initially serves mostly commercial neighborhoods. NY 117 remains on Bedford Road for its first few blocks in Pleasantville; however, it veers northeast onto Manville Road just southwest of the community's central business district.

As Manville Road, the highway heads past five residential blocks, connecting to the southbound direction of the Saw Mill River Parkway before entering Pleasantville's commercial center at Memorial Plaza. Within Memorial Plaza is Metro-North Railroad's Pleasantville station, located on the south side of NY 117. After crossing the Metro-North tracks, the route continues east along several commercial blocks before turning to the northeast and entering another residential section of Pleasantville. The highway eventually reaches the northern edge of the village, where it rejoins Bedford Road at a junction with the northern terminus of NY 141. NY 117 turns north here, following Bedford Road out of Pleasantville and into the nearby town of New Castle.

=== New Castle, Chappaqua and Mount Kisco ===
Upon crossing into New Castle, NY 117 changes names to South Bedford Road. The road takes a generally northeasterly track away from the town line to the hamlet of Chappaqua, a community just 2 miles (3.2 km) from the center of Pleasantville. NY 117 serves as Chappaqua's main north–south street, passing by commercial and residential neighborhoods ahead of an intersection with NY 120 (King Street) in Chappaqua's center. NY 120 turns north here, overlapping with NY 117 for one block before splitting off to the west. NY 117 continues north from this point as North Bedford Road, passing a strip mall before leaving Chappaqua.

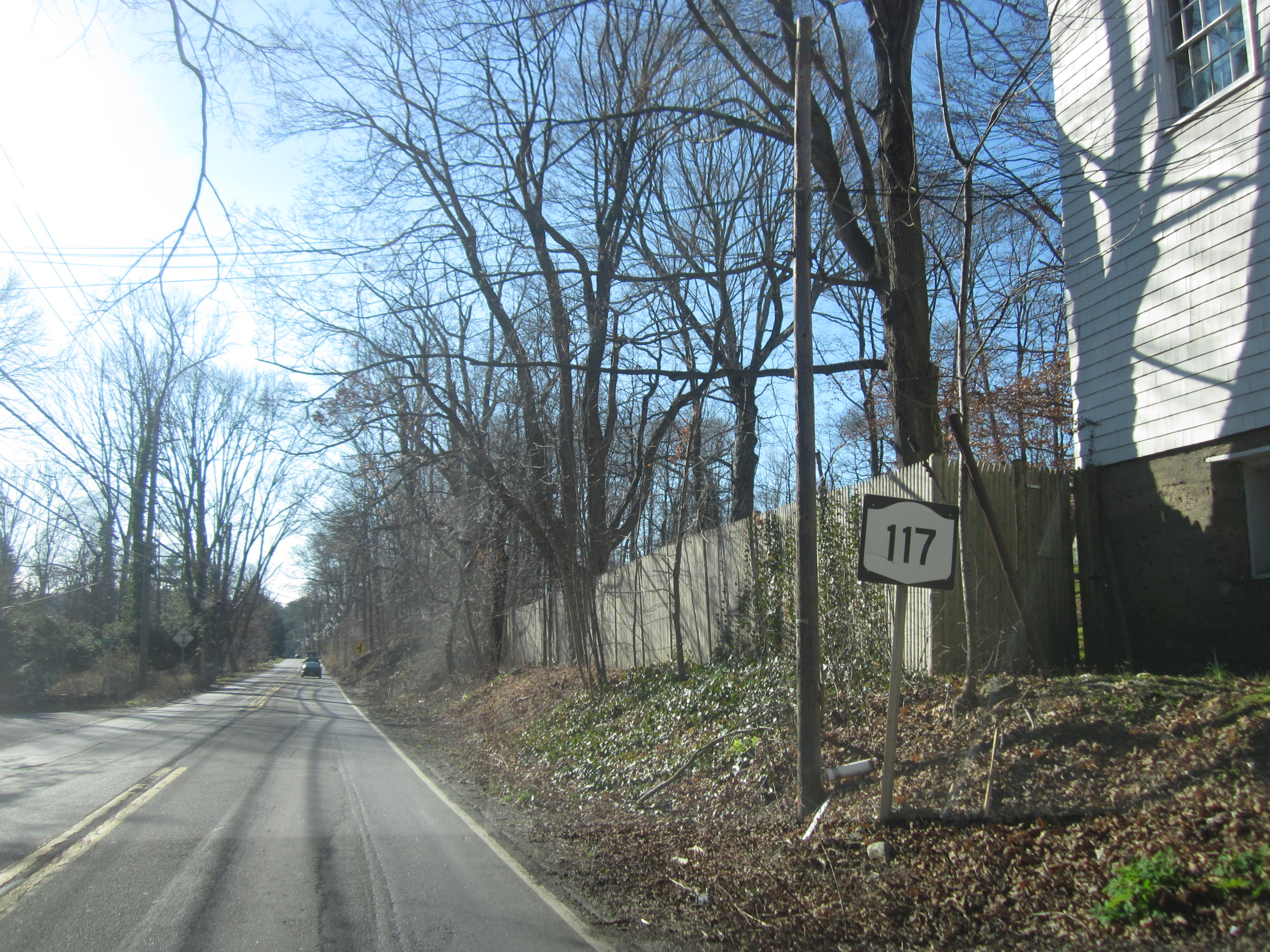
NY 117 southbound through the town of New Castle, just south of the junction with NY 120

Outside of Chappaqua, NY 117 loosely parallels the Saw Mill River Parkway as it winds its way northeastward across residential parts of New Castle. The two parallel roads connect again by way of Roaring Brook Road, located midway between Chappaqua and the next community along NY 117, the village of Mount Kisco. Roaring Brook Road also connects NY 117 and the Saw Mill River Parkway to the global headquarters of Reader's Digest, which comprises a large complex bounded by NY 117 to the east and the Metro-North tracks to the west. From here, NY 117 takes on a more pronounced northeasterly alignment that takes the route past Mount Kisco Country Club and into the village of Mount Kisco.

Just inside the village limits, NY 117 meets the north end of NY 128 at Park Avenue. Past Park Avenue, NY 117 continues north through Mount Kisco, changing names to Main Street ahead of the village's central business district. Here, the route enters a junction with the western terminus of NY 172 (South Bedford Road) at the main entrance to Northern Westchester Hospital. The commercial surroundings continue north for another eight blocks to Jeff Feigel Square, where NY 117 connects to the east end of NY 133. Main Street turns northwest onto NY 133 while NY 117 splits to the northeast along Bedford Road.

=== Mount Kisco, Bedford, and Bedford Hills ===
As the route heads away from Main Street, it proceeds through a brief wooded, residential area before entering a commercial district surrounding Mount Kisco Commons. Several businesses and an industrial complex follow after as NY 117 continues northeast through the northernmost part of Mount Kisco and into the town of Bedford. Across the town line, the development along the route remains commercial as the road parallels the nearby railroad tracks and the Saw Mill River Parkway to the northwest. About 2 miles (3.2 km) from Mount Kisco, NY 117 enters the hamlet of Bedford Hills, where the route initially serves residential neighborhoods.

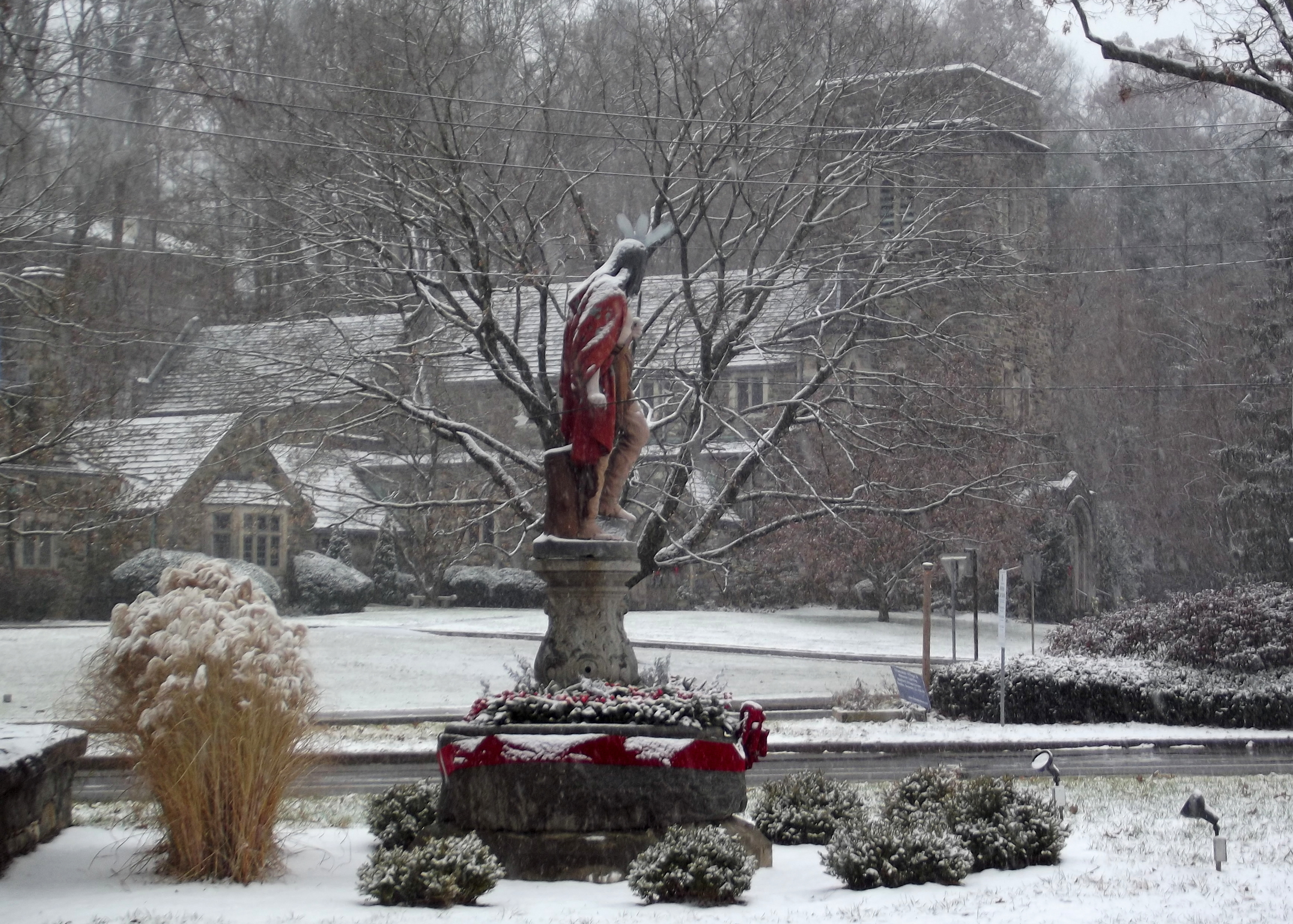
117 passing in between Chief Kisco and Saint Mark's Episcopal Church in Mount Kisco.

In the commercial center of the community, NY 117 serves the Bedford Hills Metro-North station before widening to four lanes as it crosses the railroad tracks and connects to exit 39 of the Saw Mill River Parkway. For the next mile (1.6 km), NY 117 runs alongside the northern edge of the Saw Mill River Parkway as it heads through another residential part of Bedford Hills as a two-lane road. At Harris Road, the route turns southeastward, crossing the parkway and the adjacent railroad tracks again as it intersects with the parkway's exit 42. NY 117's southeastward run on Harris Road ends just past the railroad crossing, where the highway turns northeast onto an unnamed road leading to a commercial and industrial area south of the hamlet of Katonah. After turning onto the highway, NY 117 serves various businesses before the route ends at the southbound-only exit 43 of the Saw Mill River Parkway, just south of the parkway's northern terminus at I-684. NY 117 northbound feeds into the northbound direction of the parkway, while exit 43 serves as the start of NY 117 southbound.

== History ==
=== Origins and local realignments ===
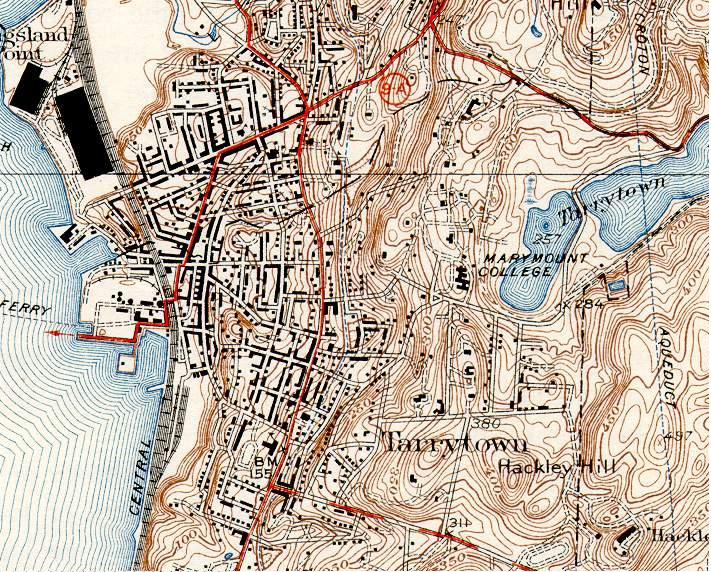
Tarrytown as it was in 1938. NY 9A entered from upper right and proceeded west to meet US 9. NY 117 began at the junction with NY 9A in the upper central portion of this image.

NY 117 was assigned as part of the 1930 renumbering of state highways in New York. It initially began at the junction of Bedford and County House Roads in Tarrytown (both part of NY 9A at the time) and followed Bedford Road northeast to NY 132 (now NY 35) at Jay Street in Katonah. NY 9A was realigned c. 1939 to follow Sleepy Hollow Road instead, bypassing Tarrytown completely. The former routing of NY 9A on Bedford Road to US 9 became a short extension of NY 117. The route was also extended on its northern end in the mid-1970s after NY 35 was moved onto a new highway that bypassed Katonah to the north.

On September 1, 1980, ownership and maintenance of NY 117 between Manville Road southwest of the Pleasantville village limits and Broadway within Pleasantville was transferred from the state of New York to Westchester County as part of a highway maintenance swap between the two levels of government. In return, ownership and maintenance of the entirety of Manville Road through Pleasantville was given to the state of New York from Westchester County. NY 117 was rerouted to follow Manville Road while NY 141 was extended one block north along NY 117's former routing to intersect Manville Road. The remainder of NY 117's former routing is now County Route 27A (CR 27A) from Manville Road to the Pleasantville village line, part of CR 106 from View Street to Pleasantville Road, and CR 27 from the Mount Pleasant village line to View Street and from Pleasantville Road to NY 141.

=== Phelps Way ===
The portion of NY 117's original routing between Tarrytown and Pleasantville passed through the center of Kykuit, the estate of the Rockefeller family, and was designed to handle 1,900 cars per day. The actual volume of traffic on the roadway was much higher as the actual average annual daily traffic reached upwards of 5,000 vehicles per day. As a result, the Rockefeller family looked into having the route realigned as early as 1932. The family suggested that a new highway be built along the northern end of the estate.

In 1965, Rockefeller unveiled plans for the Pocantico Expressway, a connector from the to-be-constructed Hudson River Expressway (NY 9A) to the Taconic State Parkway. Some opposition to the idea arose on the grounds that the new highway would only benefit the Rockefeller estate and not the residents. Nonetheless, construction began on the Pocantico Expressway (now known as Phelps Way) in 1969. When the highway was completed in November 1970, it became part of a rerouted NY 117. NY 117's former alignment along Bedford Road became NY 448. The Hudson River Expressway project was cancelled in 1971, and the western stub of the expressway now serves Phelps Hospital.

=== Katonah Bypass ===
Diagram of northern terminus realignment.

The easternmost portion of NY 117 in Katonah passed through a historic district containing several homes dating back to the late 19th century. Following the construction of nearby I-684 in 1968, this segment of NY 117 became a truck route between the Interstate Highway and industrial areas along NY 117 south of Katonah. While the Saw Mill River Parkway would have provided an alternate route to I-684 from NY 117, commercial traffic was prohibited from using the highway. The trucks that used NY 117 would shake the historic homes as it passed through the hamlet, causing small amounts of damage to the structures. A study analyzing the issue of truck traffic along NY 117 in Katonah began in 1976 at the request of the town of Bedford.

The study was completed in 1978, at which time the New York State Department of Transportation (NYSDOT) concluded that traffic would never become heavy enough along NY 117 to bring about a need for a bypass. However, the state continued to keep abreast of the situation and eventually performed a second study in 1983. Unlike the first study, this one found traffic along the highway to be on the rise. As a result, the state began making plans to construct a bypass that would divert truck traffic away from Katonah. Over the next three years, NYSDOT proposed a total of nine different routings for the bypass. The route selected by the town of Bedford would begin at Harris Road and head north and east to the Saw Mill Parkway, which it would merge into. An exception would then be made to allow commercial traffic on the parkway between the Katonah Bypass and I-684. The routing of the highway, projected to cost $8.7 million (equivalent to $24.1 million in 2024), was approved in November 1987.

In October 1990, NYSDOT accepted a low bid of $8.5 million (equivalent to $20.5 million in 2024) for the project, clearing the way for construction to begin on the bypass by the following month. The Katonah Bypass opened c. 1992 and became part of a realigned NY 117. The portion of Bedford Road from Harris Road to NY 35 is now maintained by the town of Bedford.

== Major intersections ==
The entire route is in Westchester County.

Location	mi	km	Destinations	Notes
Town of Mount Pleasant	0.00	0.00	To Rockwood Road	Western terminus; access via Kendal Way
Town of Mount Pleasant	0.00	0.00	US 9 – Ossining, Sleepy Hollow	
Town of Mount Pleasant	2.63	4.23	Eastern end of limited-access section	
Town of Mount Pleasant	2.63	4.23	NY 448 west (Bedford Road)	Former routing of NY 117; eastern terminus of NY 448
Town of Mount Pleasant	2.97	4.78	NY 9A / NY 100 – Briarcliff Manor, Elmsford, White Plains	Interchange
Town of Mount Pleasant	3.14	5.05	Taconic State Parkway north	Exit 4 on Taconic State Parkway
Pleasantville	3.98	6.41	Saw Mill River Parkway south	Exit 29 on Saw Mill River Parkway
Pleasantville	4.20	6.76	To Saw Mill River Parkway	Access via Grant Street
Pleasantville	5.14	8.27	NY 141 south	Northern terminus of NY 141; former routing of NY 117
Town of New Castle	6.59	10.61	NY 120 south – Rye	Southern end of NY 120 concurrency; hamlet of Chappaqua
Town of New Castle	6.65	10.70	NY 120 north – Millwood	Northern end of NY 120 concurrency; hamlet of Chappaqua
Mount Kisco	9.57	15.40	NY 128 south – Armonk	Northern terminus of NY 128
Mount Kisco	9.66	15.55	To NY 128 south – Armonk	Access via Armonk Road
Mount Kisco	10.23	16.46	NY 172 east to I-684 – Bedford	Western terminus of NY 172
Mount Kisco	10.98	17.67	NY 133 west – Millwood	Eastern terminus of NY 133
Mount Kisco	11.60	18.67	To Saw Mill River Parkway	Access via Preston Way
Town of Bedford	12.45	20.04	To Saw Mill River Parkway north	Access via Green Lane
Town of Bedford	13.53	21.77	Saw Mill River Parkway south	Exits 39S-N on Saw Mill River Parkway; hamlet of Bedford Hills
Town of Bedford	14.20	22.85	Saw Mill River Parkway	Exit 42 on Saw Mill River Parkway
Town of Bedford	15.23	24.51	To I-684 north	Northern terminus; access via Saw Mill River Parkway
1.000 mi = 1.609 km; 1.000 km = 0.621 mi: Concurrency terminus; Incomplete access

== See also ==
- List of county routes in Westchester County, New York
