= Interstate 487 =

Interstate 487
- Canceled portion of I-487 highlighted in brown; Croton Expressway highlighted in red

Route information
- Auxiliary route of I-87
- Length: 47 mi (76 km)
- History: Proposed in 1965; cancelled in 1971
- NHS: Entire route

Major junctions
- South end: I-87 / I-287 / New York Thruway in Tarrytown
- North end: I-84 near Beacon

Location
- Country: United States
- State: New York
- Counties: Westchester, Putnam, Dutchess

Highway system
- Interstate Highway System; Main; Auxiliary; Suffixed; Business; Future; New York Highways; Interstate; US; State; Reference; Parkways
← NY 481	→ NY 488

Interstate 487 (I-487) was a proposed intrastate Interstate Highway in the Hudson Valley region of New York in the United States. At its greatest extent, the highway, known as the Hudson River Expressway (HRE), was to run for 47 miles (76 km) on the east side of the Hudson River from I-87 in Tarrytown to I-84 east of Beacon. It was met with opposition from its introduction in 1965, leading the project to be gradually scaled back before it was cancelled completely in 1971. Ultimately, only one section was built, an 8-mile (13 km) stretch between Ossining and Peekskill. This road became known as the Croton Expressway and was designated as part of U.S. Route 9 (US 9).

== History ==
The Hudson River Expressway was an idea dating back to the 1920s. It was originally planned as a 30-mile (48 km) parkway extending from Yonkers to Peekskill along the east side of the Hudson River; however, the road's $55 million price tag led to its cancellation. In 1936, the New York City-based Regional Plan Association introduced plans to build a freeway from the Bronx to Albany, paralleling US 9 between the two locations. The proposal was cancelled as a result of World War II.

Another proposal surfaced in 1956 when the New York State Department of Public Works developed plans for a 30-mile (48 km) freeway between Tarrytown and Beacon. The road would begin at the junction of I-87 and I-287 in Tarrytown and loosely parallel US 9 before ending at I-84 east of Beacon. It was initially designated as part of I-87, intended to fill a gap in the designation that existed from Tarrytown to Newburgh. This highway was cancelled as well in the early 1960s, and the I-87 designation was shifted eastward onto another proposed highway near the eastern state line. This road was ultimately built as I-684.

In May 1965, Governor Nelson Rockefeller introduced the Hudson River Expressway, a 47-mile (76 km) freeway connecting the Major Deegan Expressway (I-87) in the Bronx to I-84 in Beacon. It was designated I-487, an auxiliary route of I-87. While previous proposals called for the road to be built slightly inland from the Hudson River, the new plan placed the highway directly on the riverbank. In some locations, the road would be built on fill extending into the river. The proposal was immediately met with opposition, and protests from residents led Rockefeller to cancel the section between the Bronx and Tarrytown in August of the same year. Two years later, the Peekskill–Beacon section was also cancelled.

The only part of the HRE that was completed was the Croton Expressway, built in 1967 from Ossining to Peekskill and designated as US 9. The remaining 10.4 miles (16.7 km) of the HRE between Ossining and Tarrytown, by this point redesignated New York State Route 399 (NY 399), were effectively cancelled on November 20, 1971, when Governor Rockefeller declared the Hudson River Expressway proposal "dead". In 1970, the state of New York petitioned to have the I-487 designation reassigned to a 69-mile (111 km) West Dutchess Expressway connecting Tarrytown to Poughkeepsie. This proposal was denied by the Federal Highway Administration.

== Exit list ==
This list reflects the final incarnation of the Hudson River Expressway, which would have been located entirely within Westchester County and extended from the New York State Thruway in Tarrytown to the Croton Expressway in Ossining.

Location	mi	km	Destinations	Notes
Tarrytown			I-87 / I-287 / New York Thruway	
Tarrytown			Waterfront	
Tarrytown			Beekman Avenue	
Tarrytown			NY 117 east	Proposed extension of Phelps Way
Town of Ossining			Rockledge Avenue	
Village of Ossining			Brayton Park, Crawbuckie Beach	
Crotonville			US 9 / NY 9A (Briarcliff–Peekskill Parkway) – Briarcliff Manor	South end of Croton Expressway
Croton-on-Hudson	26.70	42.97	Croton Point Avenue – Croton–Harmon station	
Croton-on-Hudson	26.57	42.76	NY 9A north / NY 129 east	Northern end of NY 9A concurrency; western terminus of NY 129
Crugers	30.07	48.39	NY 9A – Montrose, Buchanan	
Peekskill	33.09	53.25	NY 9A south / Welcher Avenue	Northern terminus of NY 9A
Peekskill	33.60	54.07	Louisa Street – Charles Point	
Peekskill	34.20	55.04	South Street / Hudson Avenue	
Peekskill	34.49	55.51	US 6 east / US 202 east / NY 35 east (Main Street)	Southern end of US 6/US 202 concurrency; western terminus of NY 35
1.000 mi = 1.609 km; 1.000 km = 0.621 mi: Concurrency terminus

== See also ==
- Hudson River commuter rail to New York City
