= CMES =

CMES is an abbreviation which may refer to any of the following:

- Center for Middle Eastern Studies (disambiguation)
- International Strategic Research Organization (ISRO) Center for Middle East and Africa Studies in Ankara, Turkey
- Center for Mass Education in Science at Dhaka University, Bangladesh

== See also ==
- CME (disambiguation)
