= U.S. Route 9 in New York =

U.S. Highway in New York

U.S. Route 9
- Map of New York with US 9 highlighted in red and former routings maintained as reference routes in blue

Route information
- Maintained by NYSDOT, NYCDOT, PANYNJ, Westchester County, and the cities of Yonkers, Hudson, Albany, Saratoga Springs, Glens Falls, and Plattsburgh
- Length: 324.72 mi (522.59 km)
- Existed: November 11, 1926–present
- Tourist routes: Lakes to Locks Passage; Mohawk Towpath Scenic Byway

Major junctions
- South end: I-95 / US 1-9 / US 46 at the New Jersey state line in Fort Lee, NJ
- I-95 / US 1 / NY 9A / Henry Hudson Parkway in Washington Heights; I-87 / I-287 / New York Thruway / NY 119 in Tarrytown; Bear Mountain State Parkway in Peekskill; US 6 / US 202 in Cortlandt; I-84 / NY 52 in Fishkill; US 44 / NY 55 in Poughkeepsie; I-90 in Schodack; I-787 / US 20 / NY 32 / South Mall Arterial in Albany; I-90 / NY 377 in Albany; US 11 in Champlain
- North end: I-87 in Champlain

Location
- Country: United States
- State: New York
- Counties: New York, Bronx, Westchester, Putnam, Dutchess, Columbia, Rensselaer, Albany, Saratoga, Warren, Essex, Clinton

Highway system
- United States Numbered Highway System; List; Special; Divided; New York Highways; Interstate; US; State; Reference; Parkways
← NY 8	→ NY 9A
← NY 9D	US 9E	→ NY 9F
← NY 108	US 109	→ NY 109

U.S. Route 9 (US 9) is a part of the United States Numbered Highway System that runs from Laurel, Delaware, to Champlain, New York. In New York, US 9 extends 324.72 miles (522.59 km) from the George Washington Bridge in Manhattan to an interchange with Interstate 87 (I-87) just south of the Canadian border in the town of Champlain. US 9 is the longest north–south U.S. Highway in New York. The portion of US 9 in New York accounts for more than half of the highway's total length.

The section of US 9 in New York passes through busy urban neighborhoods, suburban strips, and forested wilderness. It is known as Broadway in Upper Manhattan, the Bronx and much of Westchester County, and uses parts of the old Albany Post Road in the Hudson Valley, where it passes the historic homes of a U.S. President (Franklin D. Roosevelt) and Gilded Age heir. It passes through the downtown of Albany, the state capital, as well as Saratoga Springs. It penetrates into the deep recesses of the Adirondack Park and runs along the shore of Lake Champlain, where it is part of the All-American Road known as the Lakes to Locks Passage.

US 9 spawns more letter-suffixed state highways than any other route in New York, including the longest, 143-mile (230 km) New York State Route 9N (NY 9N). Outside of the cities it passes through, it is mostly a two-lane road, save for two freeway segments in the mid-Hudson region. For much of its southern half, it follows the Hudson River closely; in the north it tracks I-87 (Adirondack Northway).

== Route description ==
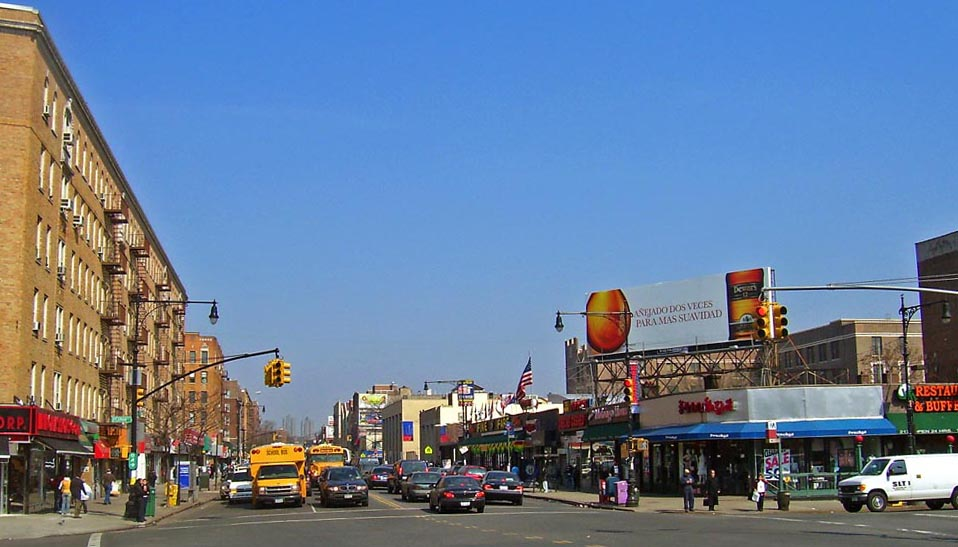
Broadway at Dyckman Street in Inwood, looking north, with billboard in Spanish

The New York segment of US 9 can be divided into the section south of Albany, which parallels the Hudson River closely, and the portion north of Albany, which takes in a long section of the eastern Adirondacks. New York State Bicycle Route 9 follows the US 9 corridor, diverging from the route in areas not conducive to bicycling. For example, State Bicycle Route 9 follows US 9W in northern New Jersey and Rockland County, crosses the Bear Mountain Bridge, and follows NY 9D and NY 301 back to US 9 in Putnam County.

=== New York City and the Hudson Valley ===
US 9 enters New York as part of an expressway, soon becoming a surface street and major urban and suburban artery. Outside of the expressway portions, it is mostly a two- or four-lane road save for a lengthy four-lane strip that leads into one of the expressways. It runs near the river more frequently in the southern areas, but it is never very far inland.

==== New York City ====
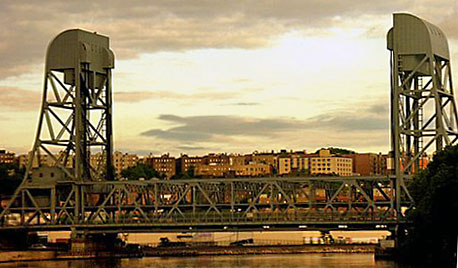
The Broadway Bridge at the northern tip of Manhattan

The concurrency between US 1 and US 9 that began in New Jersey ends at the first exit from I-95 on the George Washington Bridge, when US 9 heads north via 178th and 179th streets to Broadway. Broadway passes through the Washington Heights neighborhood and then into Inwood, the northernmost neighborhood on the island. The region in which US 9 passes through has a large Latino immigrant population. The northernmost section of the New York City Subway's underground IND Eighth Avenue Line (A train) runs along Broadway between Dyckman Street and Inwood–207th Street stations. On the corner of 204th Street is the Dyckman House, the only original farmhouse left in Manhattan and a National Historic Landmark (NHL).

Near the island's northern tip, at the intersection with 215th Street, the elevated IRT Broadway–Seventh Avenue Line (1 train) of the New York City Subway joins Broadway. At the very tip of Manhattan, just past Columbia University's Robert K. Kraft Field at Lawrence A. Wien Stadium, US 9 crosses the Harlem River Ship Canal via the Broadway Bridge, into Marble Hill, the only portion of Manhattan on the mainland. Marble Hill station here is the first of several along US 9.

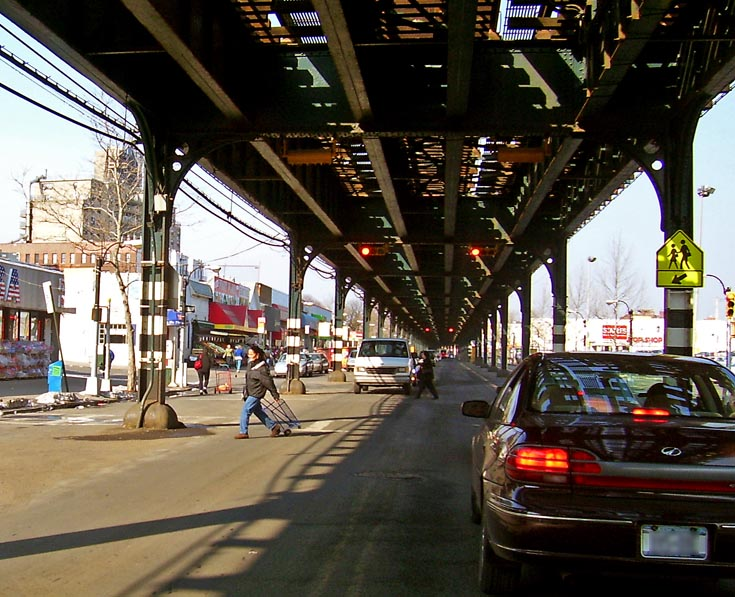
US 9 runs under the elevated IRT Broadway–Seventh Avenue Line in the Bronx.

At or just south of 230th Street, US 9, still Broadway, enters the Bronx. It draws alongside I-87, here the Major Deegan Expressway, the first of many encounters between the two roads on their northward course. At Van Cortlandt Park–242nd Street station, the subway ends and Broadway runs along the west side of Van Cortlandt Park. The Henry Hudson Parkway interchange a mile (1.6 km) up this stretch adds NY 9A to US 9.

==== Westchester County ====
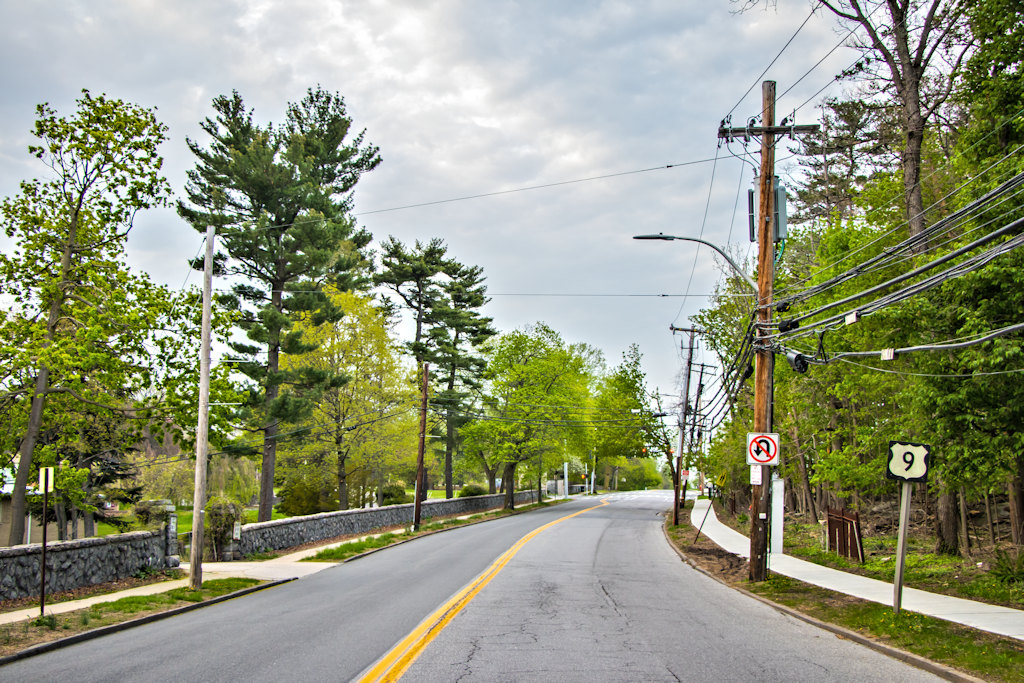
US 9 (North Broadway) in Yonkers

The northwestern corner of the park marks the city limit and US 9 enters Yonkers, where it is now known as South Broadway. It trends closer to the Hudson River, remaining a busy urban commercial street. In downtown Yonkers, it drops close to the river, becomes North Broadway and NY 9A leaves via Ashburton Avenue. US 9 climbs to the nearby ridgetop runs parallel to the river and the railroad, a few blocks east of both as it passes St. John's Riverside Hospital. The neighborhoods become more residential and the road gently undulates along the ridgetop. In Yonkers, US 9 passes Philipse Manor Hall State Historic Site, which dates back to colonial America.

It remains Broadway as it leaves Yonkers for Hastings-on-Hudson, where it splits into separate north and south routes for 0.6 miles (0.97 km). The trees become taller and the houses, many separated from the road by stone fences, become larger. Another National Historic Landmark, the Henry Draper Observatory, was the site of the first astrophotograph of the Moon.

In the next village, Dobbs Ferry, US 9 has various views of the Hudson River while passing through the residential section. The highway passes by the Croton Aqueduct and nearby the shopping district of the village. After intersecting with Ashford Avenue, US 9 passes Mercy College, then turns left again at the center of town just past South Presbyterian Church, headed for equally comfortable Irvington. Villa Lewaro, the home of Madam C. J. Walker (1867–1919), the first African-American millionaire, is along the highway here. At the north end of the village of Irvington, a memorial to writer Washington Irving, after whom the village was renamed, marks the turnoff to his home at Sunnyside. Entering into the southern portion of Tarrytown, US 9 passes by the historic Lyndhurst mansion, a massive mansion built along the Hudson River in the early 1800s.

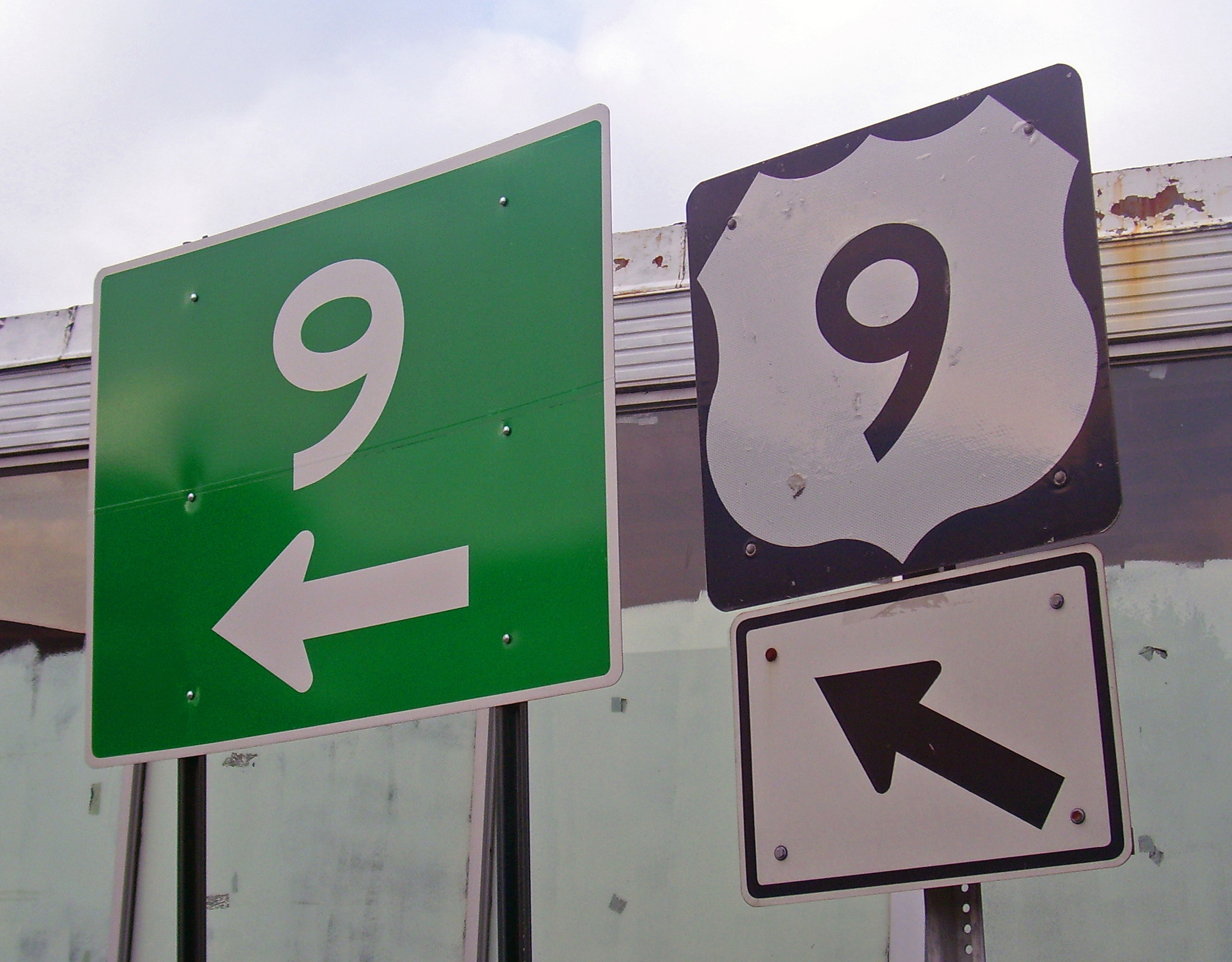
Two signs indicating the highway's turn at the NY 448 junction

North of here, at the Kraft Foods technical center, the Tappan Zee Bridge becomes visible. After crossing over the New York State Thruway and I-87, here concurrent with I-287, and then intersecting with the four-lane NY 119, where NY 119 splits off to the east, US 9 becomes the busy main street of Tarrytown. Christ Episcopal Church, where Irving worshiped, is along the street. Many high quality restaurants and shops are along this main road. This downtown ends at the eastern terminus of NY 448, where US 9 slopes off to the left, downhill, and two signs indicate that US 9 turns left, passing the Old Dutch Church of Sleepy Hollow, another NHL. The road then enters Sleepy Hollow (formerly North Tarrytown), passing the visitors' center for Kykuit, the NHL that was (and partially still is) the Rockefeller family's estate. US 9 then passes historic Sleepy Hollow Cemetery, which includes the resting place of Washington Irving and the setting for "The Legend of Sleepy Hollow".

US 9 expands to four lanes at the trumpet intersection with NY 117; Broadway finally ends and US 9 becomes Albany Post Road. Entering Ossining's downtown, US 9 becomes Highland Avenue and continues to rise and fall, widen and narrow, through the riverside community. US 9 passes in close proximity to Sing Sing correctional facility before heading toward Croton.

==== Croton Expressway ====
Just after Ossining, NY 9A returns and merges with US 9 as it crosses the mouth of the Croton River and becomes the 9.2-mile (14.8 km) Croton Expressway. The only section built of the canceled I-487, the highway is generally built to Interstate standards. NY 9A leaves the freeway and returns to two lanes, following the parent route's old course, at the second exit in Croton-on-Hudson, where NY 129 reaches its western end. US 9 passes Indian Point Energy Center, a deactivated nuclear power plant that formerly supplied power to Westchester County and New York City. The facility is visible from the majority of the northern half of the expressway.

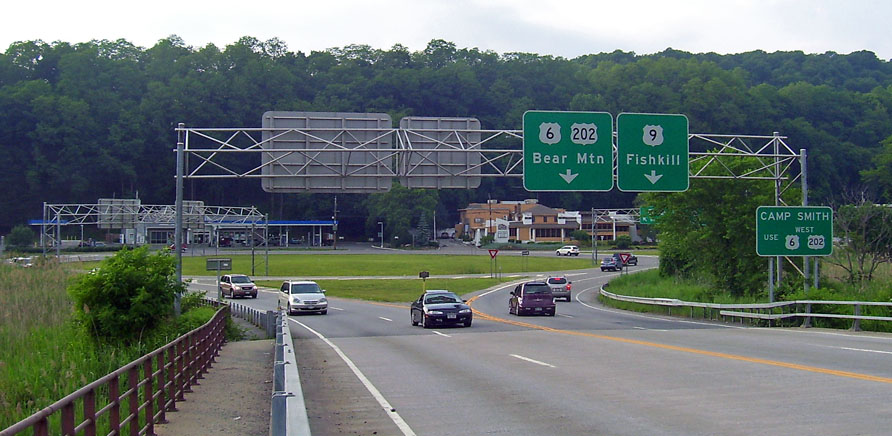
The Annsville Circle, north end of the three-U.S. Highway concurrency

The expressway veers inland for much of its route, preferring to follow the railroad tracks (the new Cortlandt station is visible to the west at one point), rather than the river past the promontory at Buchanan. NY 9A, as a surface street, ends at its parent at the Welcher Street exit. It continues on a reconstructed, widened section through Peekskill. Despite recent upgrades to freeway standards, the northern end of the highway still maintains a lower 45-mile-per-hour (72 km/h) speed limit.

One mile (1.6 km) from the freeway's northern terminus, US 202 and US 6 join the freeway. NY 35 reaches its western terminus at that same junction. The four-lane freeway's northern terminus is at a stoplight at a three-way intersection with the Bear Mountain State Parkway. The parkway continues straight from this intersection while US 6/US 9/US 202 turns left and crosses Annsville Creek.

==== Peekskill to Poughkeepsie ====
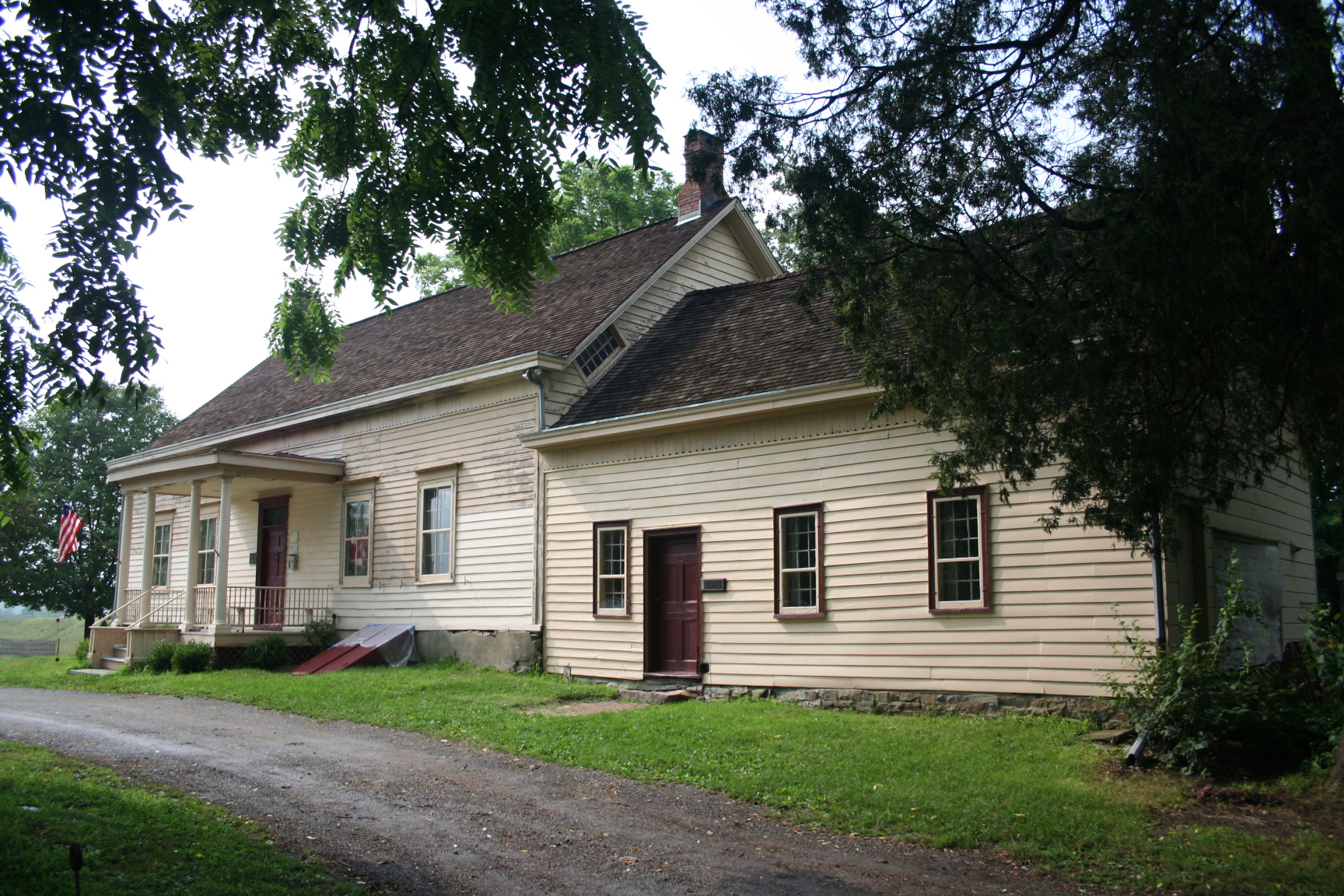
The Van Wyck Homestead, a key Continental Army supply depot during the Revolutionary War

The routes enter the Annsville traffic circle 550 feet (170 m) north of that junction. While US 6 and US 202 remain concurrent and exit the circle on its west side, continuing up the river toward the Bear Mountain Bridge, US 9 exits the roundabout on the northeast side. It continues due north as the two-lane Albany Post Road. Running inland and mostly free of development behind the Hudson Highlands, it enters Putnam County. NY 403 reaches its eastern terminus at the same intersection where the Appalachian Trail crosses the road. The gas station here has, when in service, long been a favorite stop for thru-hikers. A few miles further to the north, at the Indian Brook Road intersection in the Indian Brook Road Historic District, the highway passes through Nelson's Corner, a rare surviving early 19th-century country hamlet. Old Albany Post Road, a 6.6-mile (10.6 km) remnant of US 9's original and one of the oldest dirt roads still in use in the country, comes in from the right a mile (1.6 km) on. The only other intersection of note in Putnam County is its main east–west state route, NY 301, which crosses US 9 several miles further north, just a mile (1.6 km) south of the Dutchess County line.

US 9 passes Dutchess Mall, a dead mall, before passing the historic Van Wyck Homestead Museum. In Fishkill, the route meets I-84. At the Interstate exit, the road expands into a four-lane strip similar to the form it takes in Central New Jersey, complete with much commercial development on both sides. It will remain this way to Poughkeepsie. This stretch is an important, if often congested, transportation artery for the county.

Just north of I-84, US 9 clips off a corner of the village of Fishkill, where the intersection with NY 52 creates a heavily congested situation at rush hours since traffic going from southbound US 9 to westbound I-84 often uses it as a shortcut. The remaining miles to Wappingers Falls boast many intersections as well but are not quite as heavy.

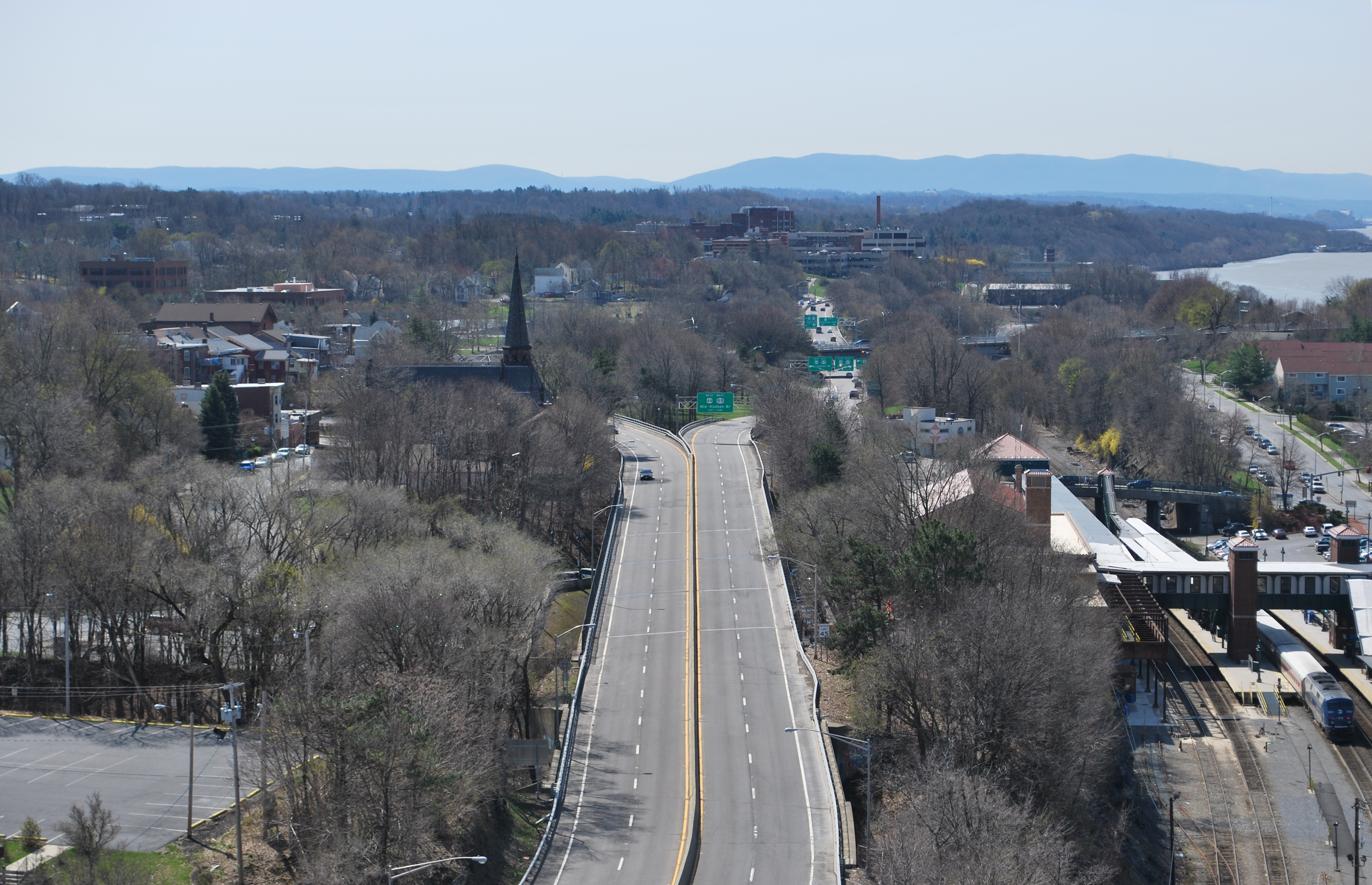
Bird's-eye view of US 9 from the Walkway over the Hudson

In the town of Poughkeepsie, just after the northern terminus of NY 9D, US 9 passes another distressed mall, the Shoppes at South Hills, and its healthier, newer counterpart, the Poughkeepsie Galleria. A mile (1.6 km) further north, NY 113 swings to the west at a cloverleaf interchange near the IBM plant, once the region's major employer. Entering the city of Poughkeepsie, at Sharon Drive, US 9 returns to expressway status once again. Two miles (3.2 km) north of Sharon, the highway connects to the US 44/NY 55 concurrency at an interchange in close proximity to the Mid-Hudson Bridge. This creates some unusual left exits, as traffic from US 44/NY 55 east wanting to go north on US 9 is routed into a U-turn south of the highway, and, likewise, northbound drivers on US 9 must get turned around to go west over the river. The limited-access highway comes to an end at the intersection with NY 9G near Marist College.

==== Poughkeepsie to Albany ====
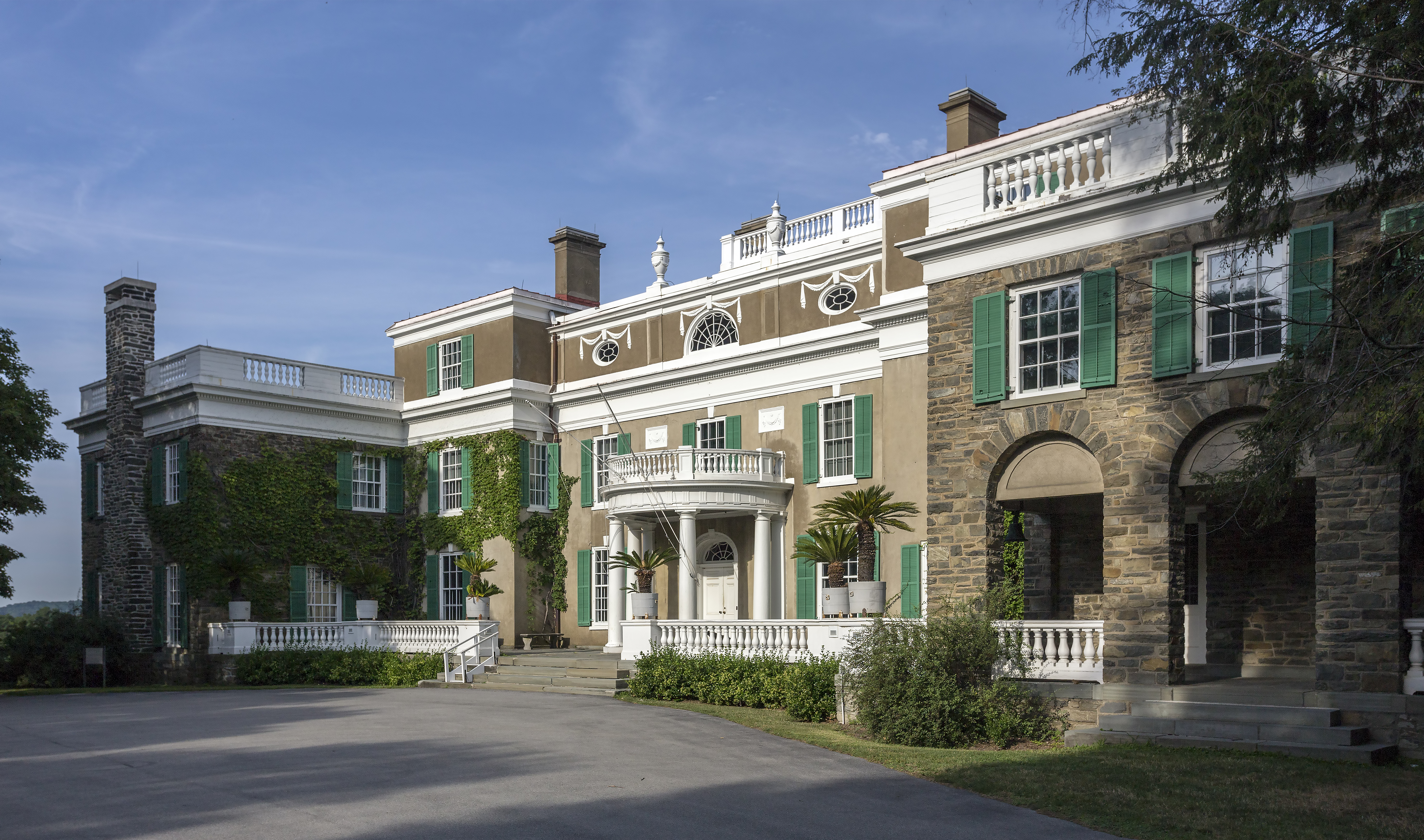
Springwood, the home of Franklin D. Roosevelt

North of Poughkeepsie, US 9 is at first a busy four-lane undivided route, with occasional turn lanes as it approaches Hyde Park, passing Marist College, the main campus of the Culinary Institute of America and then the home and presidential library of native Franklin D. Roosevelt. It narrows to two lanes at the built-up area that marks the center of town, then opens up a turn lane for traffic entering the third of the town's tourist attractions, Vanderbilt Mansion National Historic Site.

Past Hyde Park, the road narrows to two lanes again as traffic becomes more local. The area recalls Westchester County with many wooded tracts and stone walls at roadside. Through here, it has been running fairly close to the river, but, after Staatsburg, the highway begins to veer inland again. The land to the west, between road and river, forms the Hudson River Historic District, the largest in the country and another National Historic Landmark. US 9 is at least two miles (3.2 km) east of the river when it reaches Rhinebeck, the next town along the route, where NY 308 heads off to the east, and close to the Old Rhinebeck Aerodrome aviation museum.

At Weys Corners, the X-shaped intersection north of Rhinebeck, northbound traffic to the river and the Kingston–Rhinecliff Bridge via NY 199 typically bears left onto NY 9G. Southbound traffic, in turn, takes NY 199 itself to the river when the two meet in Red Hook three miles (4.8 km) further ahead. Two blocks north of that junction are the Village Diner, originally named the Halfway Diner since it was roughly halfway along US 9 from New York City to Albany, and the Elmendorph Inn, a mid-18th century counterpart to the diner. North of Red Hook, the land around the road begins to open up into farms and fields, offering frequent views of the Catskill Escarpment across the river. This terrain continues into Columbia County, which US 9 enters five miles (8.0 km) beyond Red Hook.

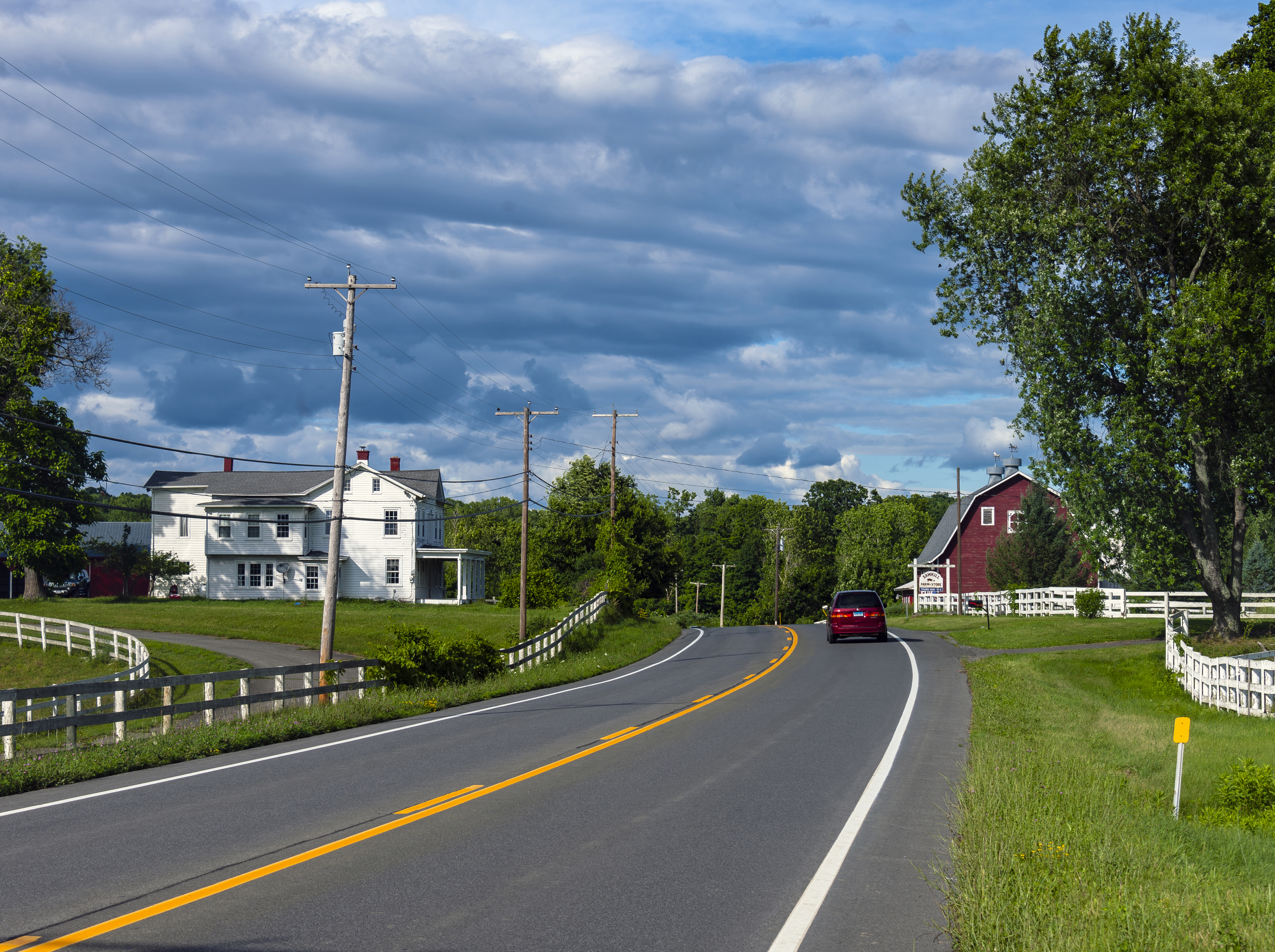
Bucolic Hudson Valley landscape along US 9 in Dutchess County

The road remains two lanes, with mostly local traffic and no stop signs or traffic lights, until the oblique four-way intersection in Bell Pond, 10 miles (16 km) into the county. Here, NY 23 joins US 9 as it heads west, which in turn joins NY 9H on the northern roadway while NY 82 departs to the southeast. US 9 turns northward again toward Hudson, the county seat, 1.5 miles (2.4 km) west, in Greenport, passing the Holcim-owned cement plant whose expansion was recently blocked by community activists after seven contentious years.

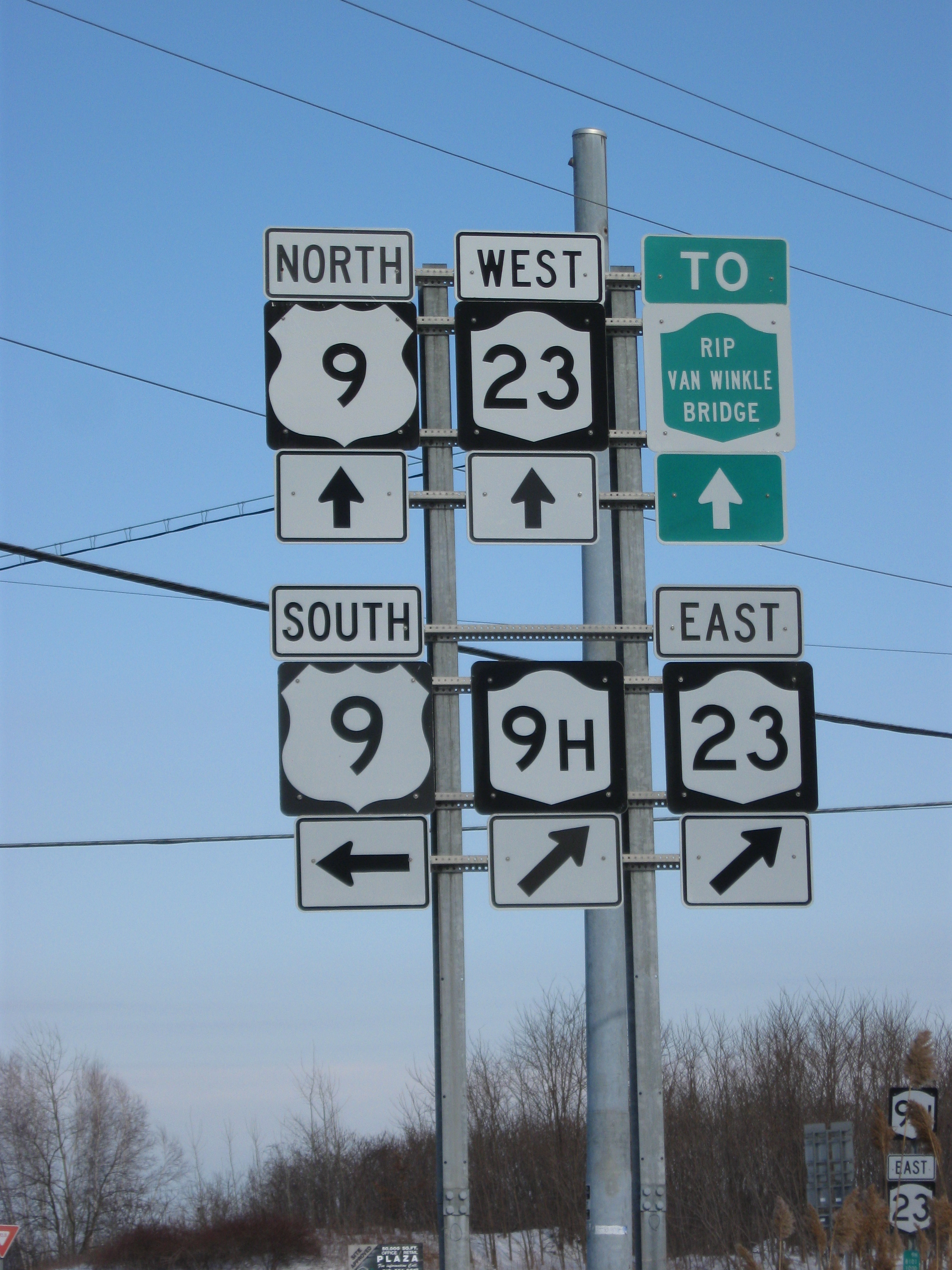
NY 9H intersection in Bell Pond

On the east fringe of Hudson's historic downtown, US 9 intersects the northern terminus of NY 9G and NY 23B. NY 23B runs concurrent with US 9 for a short distance eastward before splitting at Fairview Avenue, which US 9 follows out of Hudson. A commercial strip with turn lane gives way after 1.75 miles (2.82 km) to the lightly traveled rural two-lane US 9 north of Hudson. Near Stockport, US 9 meets the southern terminus of NY 9J. Farther north, after passing through Kinderhook, home of another U.S. president, Martin Van Buren, the road passes under NY 9H at a grade-separated interchange before intersecting the northern terminus of NY 9H a short distance later outside Valatie. When a developer wanted to add a fifth leg to this intersection for a new shopping center, the New York State Department of Transportation required the developer to convert the signalized intersection to a roundabout, despite heavy local opposition.

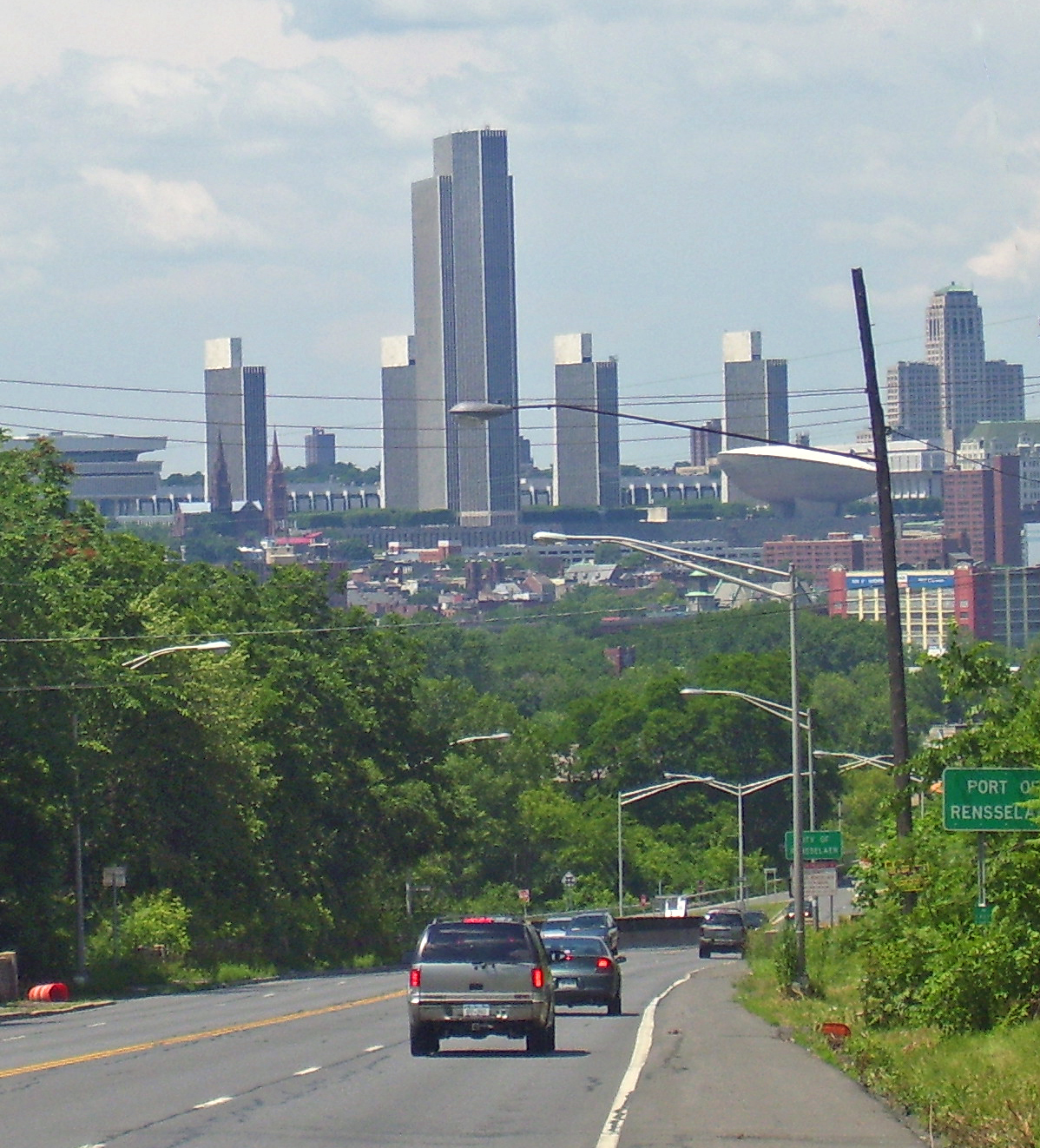
The Empire State Plaza seen from approach to Albany

The highway widens to four lanes with a turn lane shortly after crossing into Rensselaer County and will remain so for most of the rest of the way to Albany, despite limited development and low traffic in some areas. Within a mile (1.6 km) of the county line it passes under the New York State Thruway Berkshire Connector and meets the lone section of I-90 in New York not part of the thruway system, at exit 12 southeast of Castleton-on-Hudson. Four miles (6.4 km) north of I-90 and four miles (6.4 km) northwest of Nassau, US 9 veers left to merge with US 20 in Schodack Center, and, together, they progress northwest toward Albany. Less than 0.5 miles (0.80 km) from the eastern terminus of the overlap, US 9 and US 20 intersect NY 150 before connecting to I-90 at exit 11.

As the roadway heads westward, it meets the western (southern for state purposes) terminus of US 4 across from a Hannaford Brothers Company supermarket along the busy commercial strip in East Greenbush. Shortly afterward, the first sign of the state capital, the Erastus Corning Tower, starts becoming visible. At a bluff east of the river, the entire Albany skyline comes into view as the road descends, passing the northern terminus of NY 9J south of Rensselaer. US 9 and US 20 then cross the Hudson River via the Dunn Memorial Bridge into Albany as Corning Tower and the other buildings of the Empire State Plaza loom ahead, and the two routes separate, with US 20 heading west across the city.

=== Albany and North ===
North of Albany, US 9 starts to pull away from the Hudson corridor, eventually picking up I-87, now the Adirondack Northway.

==== Albany to Saratoga Springs ====
After the bridge, US 9 runs under I-787 for several blocks, then takes an offramp past the Albany Pump Station to become Clinton Avenue. There, it intersects the two routes which have paralleled US 9 up the west side of the Hudson. At Pearl Street and the Palace Theatre, it crosses NY 32 (North Pearl Street), which continues north, and US 9W (Lark Street), which ends at the junction. US 9 turns north on Henry Johnson Boulevard and widens to cross I-90 again via a flyover originally built for the canceled Mid-Crosstown Arterial, exiting the city of Albany in the process.

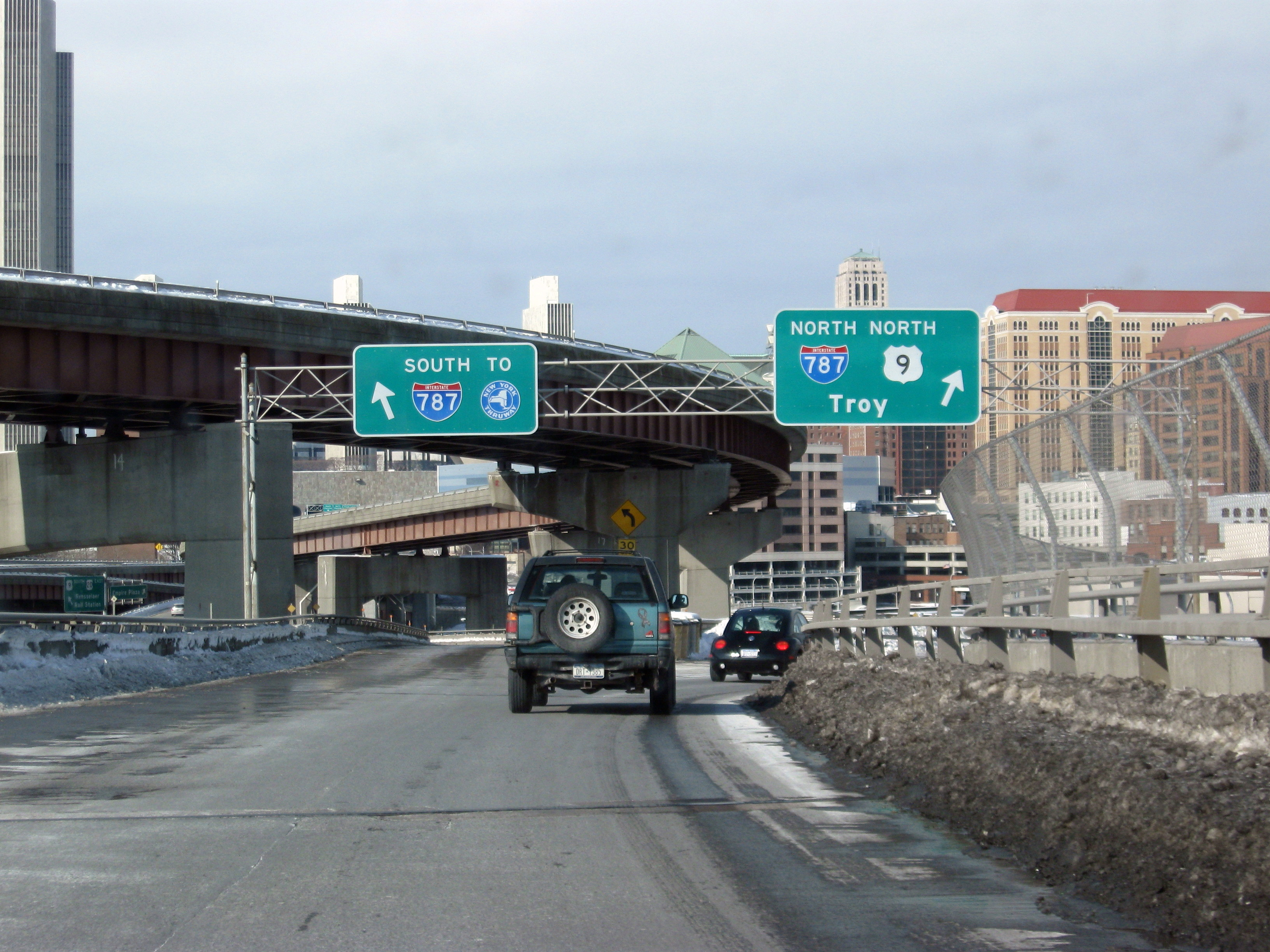
US 9 meets ramps bound for I-787 after crossing the Dunn Memorial Bridge in Albany.

Just before reaching the northern suburb of Colonie, US 9 returns to two lanes and follows Loudon Road through well-to-do residential neighborhoods past Albany Memorial Hospital and Wolferts Roost Country Club. The short NY 377 forks off to the north while US 9 trends slightly westward. A five-way intersection marks Loudonville. Siena College in Newtonville is on the east side a mile (1.6 km) past the junction, with the Colonie Town Hall opposite.

Continuing northward into Latham, the highway adds a middle turn lane. NY 155 intersects as the Northway draws near to the west. Beyond, the road expands to four lanes and commercial property resumes. At the Latham Circle, US 9 crosses beneath NY 2. A mile (1.6 km) further north, the expressway portion of NY 7 crosses over for eastbound traffic and then NY 9R goes off to the east, to return two miles (3.2 km) further north. At the junction, US 9 starts to trend eastward again, away from the Northway and finally crosses the Mohawk River into Saratoga County via the Crescent Bridge at the northernmost point of Albany County.

A new name, Halfmoon Parkway, comes with the change of county, after the town the road runs through. The eastward bent reverses itself as another state route, NY 236 forks off to the north. By the time US 9 reaches the NY 146 junction in Clifton Park, the Northway is right alongside again. The roads continue running parallel courses past Round Lake as NY 67 joins US 9 into Malta, leaving 1.6 miles (2.6 km) later at the center of town for its own exit along the Northway. Another 1.5 miles (2.4 km) to the north, another lettered subroute of US 9, NY 9P, leaves east for Saratoga Lake.

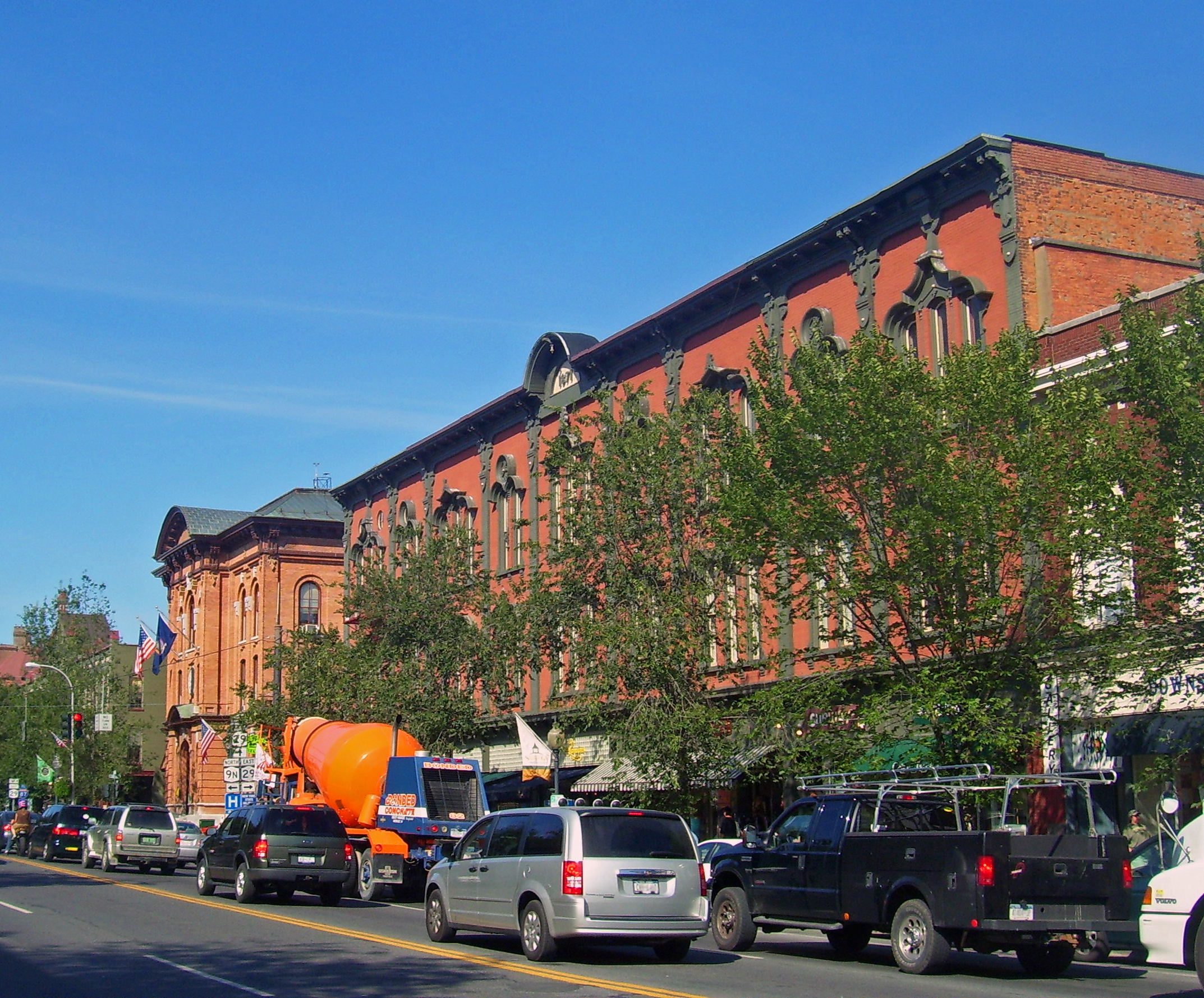
Downtown Saratoga Springs

US 9 itself has its first exit with the Northway, its first junction with I-87 since Tarrytown in fact, two miles (3.2 km) north of NY 9P. This full cloverleaf is the main exit for Saratoga Springs. The resort town's historic downtown is four miles (6.4 km) ahead, past Saratoga Spa State and Congress parks. Here, US 9, as South Broadway, begins a concurrency with NY 50 and, later, briefly, with NY 29. NY 9P completes its loop here, and another lettered route, NY 9N, the longest letter-suffixed route in the state, begins at the post office. Tacking eastward out of town, US 9 and NY 50 follow Van Dam Street until US 9 returns to a northerly course on Marion Avenue, which becomes Maple Avenue at the city limit.

==== Saratoga Springs to Lake George ====
Once past the sleeve of development around the highway north of the city, US 9 leaves the Capital District as it gets less developed through Wilton and Moreau. The Palmerstown Range begins to rise on one side, anticipating the mountainous country to come. From the hamlet of Kings Station onward, what is now signed as Saratoga Road follows a straight northeast course for 10 miles (16 km) through more wooded countryside to the entrance to Moreau Lake State Park. A mile (1.6 km) further on, US 9 again intersects the Northway at exit 17.

Another 1.5 miles (2.4 km) brings it to the western end of NY 197 (Reynolds Road). US 9 continues straight ahead for the next three miles (4.8 km) into the village of South Glens Falls, where NY 32 (Gansevoort Road) comes in at an oblique angle from the south and merges with US 9 to cross the Hudson via the Cooper's Cave Bridge for the last time, leaving Saratoga County and entering the Warren County city of Glens Falls.

The two routes follow Glen Street to Centennial Circle, a five-legged roundabout in the center of the city's downtown area, where NY 32 leaves to the right via Warren Street and NY 9L takes Ridge Street due north. US 9 continues via Glen to the northwest, becoming Upper Glen Street at the city limit. NY 254 (Aviation Road) comes in from its nearby western terminus at the Northway. The highway remains heavily developed for the next three miles (4.8 km) to a junction with another route beginning at I-87, NY 149. It joins with US 9 briefly before leaving to the east north of the Adirondack–Lake George Outlet Mall. Many vehicles make that turn, as NY 149 is the best route from the Northway into southern Vermont, 30 miles (48 km) to the east.

US 9 continues to parallel the Interstate. At the Queensbury–Lake George town line, a massive wooden shingle lets drivers know they have crossed the Blue Line into the Adirondack Park. The route straightens out for the next 2.5 miles (4.0 km) into the village of Lake George, a popular tourist destination.

It takes the name Canada Street, and NY 9N comes in from the west to run concurrently with. The two routes widen to a busy four-lane road past shops catering to a busy tourist trade. Shortly thereafter, NY 9L loops back to the parent route, after having followed the east shore of the lake that gives the village its name. At the northern end of the village of Lake George, NY 9N splits via Lake Shore Drive to follow the western shore, and US 9 itself takes a northwesterly turn to remain parallel with the Northway.

==== Adirondack Park ====
Past Lake George, US 9 enters the Adirondack Park. The next 90 miles (140 km) of the highway runs through the eastern section of the largest protected area east of the Mississippi River, 6,100,000 acres (2,500,000 ha) with vast tracts of Forest Preserve kept "forever wild" per the state constitution. Accordingly, US 9 remains a two-lane rural road, often very close to the Adirondack Northway, a section of I-87, throughout the park. Development, traffic, and population are minimal, the surrounding land is heavily wooded, and the two roads cover very long distances between very small towns.

After Lake George, there is another exit with the Northway, to ease access to the village by southbound traffic. US 9 remains very close to the Northway on its east side, resulting in another exit four miles (6.4 km) north. This serves Warrensburg, where NY 418 reaches its eastern terminus. The highway begins to move further away from the interstate, and, three miles (4.8 km) further, NY 28 concludes its long bow-shaped route at a junction with US 9.

Nearly nine miles (14 km) north, at Chestertown, US 9 meets and joins NY 8, which carries it due west almost four miles (6.4 km) to Loon Lake. After crossing over a southwestern bay of the lake, US 9 turns right and is once again on its own, trending northeast alongside the lake's western shore to eventually reach the Northway again in four miles (6.4 km). This exit serves only northbound traffic. A mile (1.6 km) later, there is access to the other direction.

The road begins to run along the west shore of Schroon Lake, in the process crossing into Essex County. Shortly after the county line, an access road leads to I-87 again. It is seven miles (11 km) from here, past the hamlet of Schroon Lake at the water's northern tip, that US 9 intersects NY 74, like NY 254 and NY 149 fresh off its western terminus at the Northway. Signs at this junction use Ticonderoga, 17 miles (27 km) to the east, as a control city, an indication of how sparsely populated the park is.

US 9 remains close to the interstate for the next 16 miles (26 km) into the town of North Hudson, where Boreas Road provides access to the Dix Mountain Wilderness Area the southernmost in the Adirondack High Peaks region. The highway again crosses the interstate to connect I-87 to the western terminus of NY 73, the well-traveled scenic route to Keene Valley and Lake Placid. At this ornate junction, US 9 is at 1,155 feet (352 m) above sea level, the highest elevation it reaches along its entire length.

The right turn takes it again to the northeast past Rocky Peak Ridge and the Giant Mountain Wilderness Area, to the hamlet of New Russia. This 10-mile (16 km) stretch brings the highway to Elizabethtown, the unincorporated county seat and the first settlement US 9 has passed through since Warrensburg. NY 9N comes through town from the west; it and US 9 briefly overlap.

While the land remains mostly forested as the road continues its northeast course from Elizabethtown, it begins to descend somewhat as the valley of Lake Champlain draws near. US 9 eventually draws close to the Northway again at Poke-O-Moonshine Mountain, the Adirondacks' most popular climbing spot. In Chesterfield, 18 miles (29 km) without a major highway junction are ended when NY 22 joins US 9 after its exit, the first pairing of two highways that begin their journey upstate in New York City.

The two routes enter Keeseville, where, in mid-village, they cross the Ausable River and enter Clinton County. NY 9N reappears here, reaching its northern terminus. North of the village, the two routes split again and exchange the roles they had been playing for their entire northward journey. US 9 takes the eastward fork to the lake, running close to the state's edge; while NY 22 will run inland from here to the border.

After Keeseville, US 9 follows AuSable Chasm down to the lake shore. It crosses the Ausable and briefly reenters Essex County long enough for the short NY 373 to provide access to the Burlington–Port Kent Ferry. A third and final crossing takes it out the Adirondack Park.

==== Lake Champlain, Plattsburgh, and Canada ====
After US 9 passes Ausable Marsh Wildlife Management Area and NY 442 comes in from the east at the small hamlet of Peru, US 9 heads down to the shore of the lake itself, which it will stay close to all the way into Plattsburgh as Lakes to Locks Passage. On clear days, it is possible to see Burlington across the water. Ahead lies Valcour Island. In the narrow, rocky strait between it and the shore, Benedict Arnold's hastily built fleet held off the British Army on October 11, 1776, in the Battle of Valcour Island in what is considered the first battle in U.S. naval history. More recent military history is apparent shortly thereafter when US 9 passes now-closed Plattsburgh Air Force Base, a pillar of the regional economy Plattsburgh has struggled to replace.

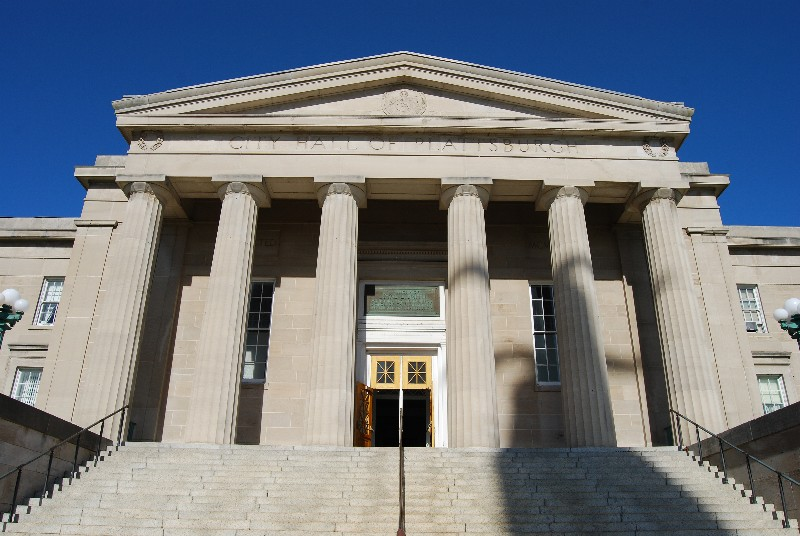
Plattsburgh City Hall

When it actually enters Plattsburgh, it becomes first U.S. Avenue, then Peru Street when it passes the Old Catholic Cemetery. The Saranac River draws alongside twice before US 9 takes a left turn at Bridge Street and crosses it. Just past the bridge, the highway turns left again onto City Hall Place at the center of town. US 9 passes in front of the City Hall designed by John Russell Pope, also the builder of the Jefferson Memorial in Washington DC. Two more quick lefts follow past the large obelisk of Riverside Park, onto Miller and Cornelia streets, and then US 9 turns right at the eastern terminus of the lengthy NY 3 to follow Margaret Street north and out of the city.

It bends northeast to return to the lake shore shortly after the city limit, following alongside Cumberland Bay. At the Dead Creek crossing, US 9 widens to four lanes for the first time since the Albany area to handle the heavy traffic at the junction with the eastern terminus of NY 314, which continues east on County Route 57 (CR 57) to another ferry connector, just southeast of the Northway. 2 miles (3 km) north of the junction, after North Country Shopping Center, the highway returns to two lanes and the name Lakes to Locks Passage as it overlooks Woodruff Pond and Treadwell Bay. I-87 is visible a thousand feet (300 m) to the east across the many open fields as the two roads parallel each other's turns closely.

Another short route, CR 58, formerly NY 456, comes in from the west and terminates at US 9 shortly after the right turn for Point Au Roche State Park. Continuing northward, the road deviates to the east slightly in the town of Chazy but returns to its previous track by the Interstate at the Little Chazy River bridge. Shortly afterward, US 9 intersects CR 23 (Miner Farm Road, formerly NY 191 west of US 9).

US 9 runs straight due north, no longer taking another name, three miles (4.8 km) to the next major intersection, NY 9B (Lavalley Road), its last subroute. NY 9B does not terminate but instead runs to the lake shore and eventually north to Rouses Point. A bend slightly to the west, closer to the Northway, brings the next three-mile (4.8 km) stretch to US 9's last major intersection, US 11, just south of Champlain.

US 9 winds through the quiet border village as its Main Street, turning west-northwest near Champlain's northern boundary to make its last water crossing over the Chazy River. The route, still known as Main Street, heads northwest toward the Northway to follow it for the last 0.5 miles (0.80 km), passing a few customs brokerages toward its official end at the on-ramp to the last exit. Traffic to Canada must get on I-87 here.

The roadway continues as the East Service Road, unsigned NY 971B, for another 0.46 miles (0.74 km). This was the former route of US 9 to the border prior to the construction of the Northway. It is devoid of any development save some long vacant and abandoned lots, finally ending in a parking lot 400 feet (120 m) south of the border from which the Canadian customs station at the south end of Autoroute 15 is visible.

== History ==
=== Origins ===
South of Albany, the main route of travel before the 20th century was the Albany Post Road, wending from New York City to a ferry at Greenbush. North of Albany, US 9 replaced the Great Northern Road, which ran from the Hudson River near Glens Falls through Schroon Lake and Elizabethtown to the Canadian border; this road became a toll road in the 1800s, known as the Great Northern Turnpike. In the early 20th century, much of the Albany Post Road was signed as an auto trail of the same name, though south of Tarrytown the trail skewed eastward along Nepperan and Sleepy Hollow roads to Elmsford; Hartsdale Road to Hartsdale; Central Avenue, Jerome Avenue, and the Grand Concourse to Manhattan; and 149th Street, 7th Avenue, 110th Street, and 5th Avenue to Washington Square.

Much of what is now US 9 in New York was assigned an unsigned legislative route designation by the New York State Legislature in 1908. Route 2 joined modern US 9 at Archville (north of Tarrytown) and followed it north to Croton-on-Hudson, where it turned off to the northeast on modern NY 129. The legislative route rejoined what is now US 9 at Peekskill and remained on it to Valatie, where it met Route 1. Route 2 ended here while Route 1 continued north to Albany on current US 9. From Albany to Clifton Park and from South Glens Falls to Riparius, modern US 9 was part of Route 25. At Riparius, Route 25 met Route 22, which utilized what is now US 9 from Riparius to Elizabethtown and from Keeseville to the town of Champlain. While modern US 9 travels directly from Elizabethtown to Keeseville and bypasses Rouses Point to the west, Route 25 used current NY 9N between Elizabethtown and Keeseville and served Rouses Point via modern NY 9B. Route 2 and Route 25 were realigned slightly on March 1, 1921, to utilize the modern US 9 corridor from Croton-on-Hudson to Peekskill and from Saratoga Springs to South Glens Falls, respectively.

When the first set of posted routes in New York were assigned in 1924, the general routing of modern US 9 was designated as New York State Route 6 (NY 6), which went from the New York City line at Yonkers north to the Canada–United States border near Rouses Point. From New York City, NY 6 followed current US 9 north to Tarrytown, where it joined legislative Route 2 and continued north through Valatie to Albany via legislative Route 1 and Route 2. North of Albany, NY 6 served Cohoes, Mechanicville, and Round Lake via modern NY 32 and NY 67. At Round Lake, NY 6 rejoined the path of current US 9 and headed north to Saratoga Springs. Past Saratoga Springs, NY 6 continued to Rouses Point on legislative Route 22 and Route 25. NY 6 had two spur routes: NY 6A in Westchester County and NY 6B in Rensselaer and Saratoga counties.

=== Designation ===
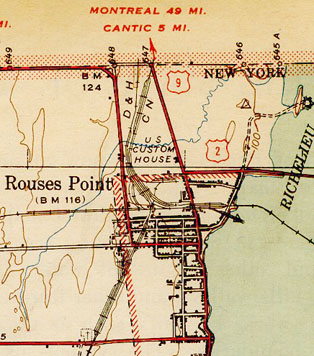
1943 U.S. Geological Survey map showing former north end of US 9 near Rouses Point, where US 11 reaches Canada today

In the original 1925 plan for the U.S. Numbered Highway System, US 9 was designated along the west bank of the Hudson River from the New Jersey line to Albany, utilizing then-NY 10. North of Albany, US 9 mostly followed NY 6 to Canada. The lone deviation was from Elizabethtown to Keeseville, where US 9 was routed on a previously unnumbered highway to the east instead. NY 6 east of the Hudson (up to Rensselaer) and a further extension to Glens Falls via Troy, Mechanicville, and Schuylerville was designated as U.S. Route 109 (US 109). The alignment of US 9 within New York remained unchanged in the final system alignment approved on November 11, 1926. However, when US 9 was commissioned in New York in 1927, the US 109 designation had been dropped and was signed instead as U.S. Route 9E (US 9E), but only up to Waterford. The segment on the west bank of the Hudson from New Jersey to Waterford was redesignated as US 9W, with the split routes meeting in Waterford. From there, unsuffixed US 9 began (still along NY 6) and went up to the Canadian border via Rouses Point as planned in 1925.

The former routing of NY 6 between Elizabethtown and Keeseville, bypassed by US 9, became NY 9W at this time. A shorter, more inland alternate route between Albany and Round Lake was designated as NY 9C sometime in the late 1920s.

=== Realignments ===
In the 1930 renumbering of state highways in New York, the "E" suffix was dropped from all of US 9E south of East Greenbush—making it part of US 9—while US 9W was truncated southward to end in Albany. At the same time, US 9 was realigned between Albany and Round Lake to use what had been NY 9C. The Waterford–Mechanicville portion of US 9's former routing and the segment of US 9E between East Greenbush and Waterford became part of an extended US 4. The remainder of the old riverside route south of Waterford became part of NY 32 while the Round Lake–Mechanicville segment of old US 9 became part of NY 67.

US 9 originally crossed into New Jersey via the 125th Street Ferry in Harlem. It was shifted northward onto the George Washington Bridge when it opened in 1931.

In 1933, construction was finished on a new bridge over the Hudson River, replacing an earlier span from 1882.

The Latham Circle was built in 1934.

In 1935, US 9 was signed within New York City for the first time, as were several other U.S. Highways and state routes. US 9 followed the George Washington Bridge into Manhattan, where it continued east on 179th Street to Broadway. Here, US 9 turned north as it does today, following Broadway through Manhattan and the Bronx to Yonkers.

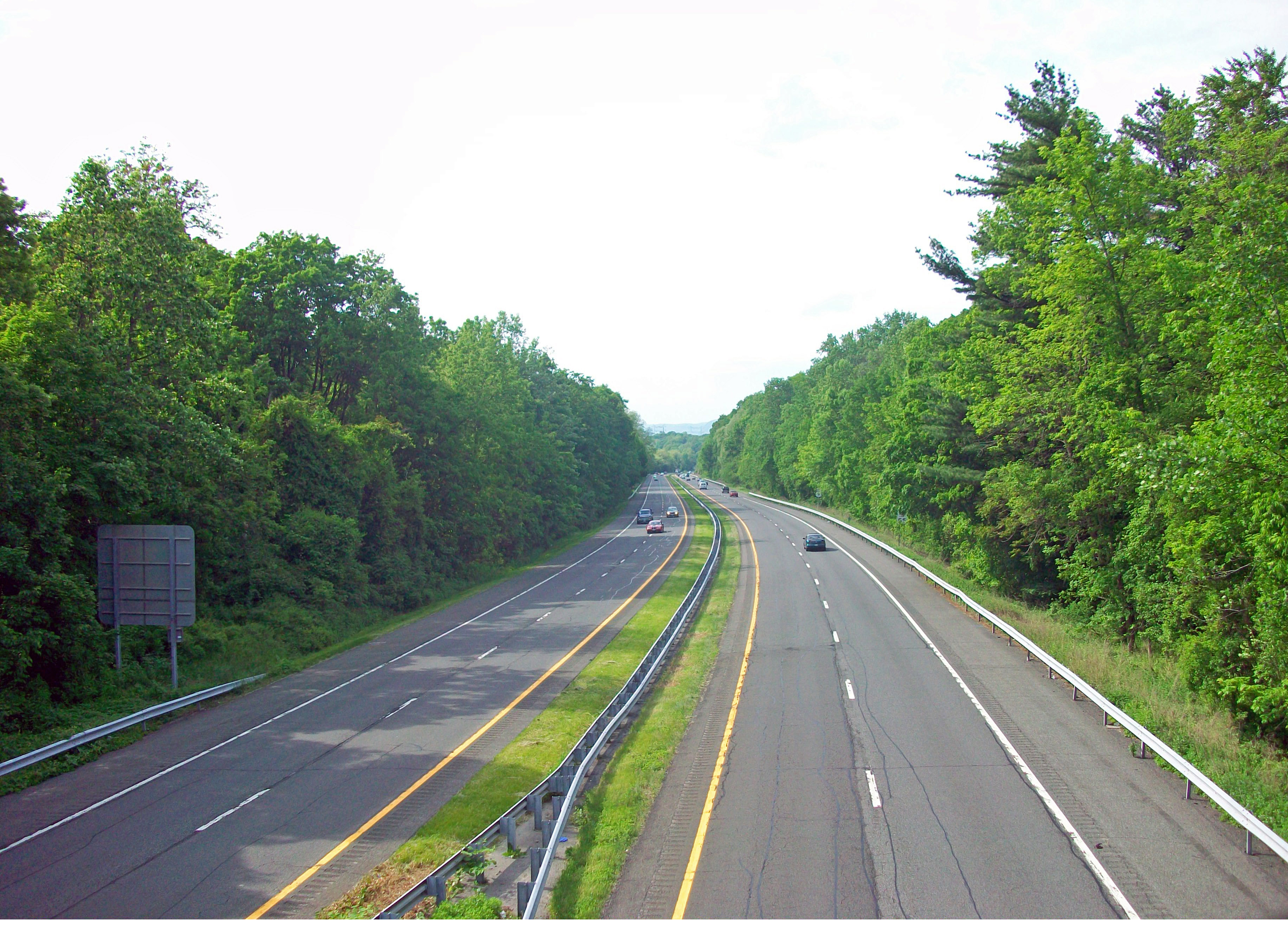
The Croton Expressway

In 1942, the northern end of US 9 was realigned to enter Canada via Champlain instead of Rouses Point. The old route through Rouses Point became NY 9B. In 1955, a new Crescent Bridge was opened to replace the previous truss span.

In the late 1950s, an underpass was built at the Latham Circle to give motorists the option to skip the circle and continue on US 9. It opened to traffic on December 12, 1958.

The route was moved from 179th Street to the Cross Bronx Expressway c. 1963 following the completion of the highway in the vicinity of the eastern approach to the George Washington Bridge.

From 1965 to 1968, the Adirondack Northway was completed in the vicinity of Champlain, supplanting the northernmost mile (1.6 km) of US 9.

In 1969, the Dunn Memorial Bridge was opened, replacing the preexisting truss bridge.

US 9 initially overlapped with I-87 from exit 43 to the Canadian border; however, it was truncated to end at exit 43—the last interchange before the border—in 1970. Part of US 9's former routing to the border was retained as a service road and was designated as NY 971B, an unsigned reference route.

Since the 1940s, an expressway along the US 9 corridor on the east bank of the Hudson River had been planned. Part of the route later became the New York State Thruway (up to Tarrytown). In 1956, there were plans to continue the expressway further north to I-84 in Beacon and beyond. This was one of the proposed alignments for I-87. In early 1965, this unconstructed expressway was assigned the designation I-487, allowing a commercial-vehicle-accessible means of travel on the east side of the Hudson River. By 1967, strong resident opposition caused the segment from Peekskill to Beacon to be canceled. In 1971, the section from Tarrytown to Ossining had also been canceled due to lack of public support. The only portion that was ever built was the section from Crotonville to Peekskill and was later named the Croton Expressway. The Croton Expressway opened in 1967 with the US 9 designation. The original surface alignment of US 9 became an extension of NY 9A.

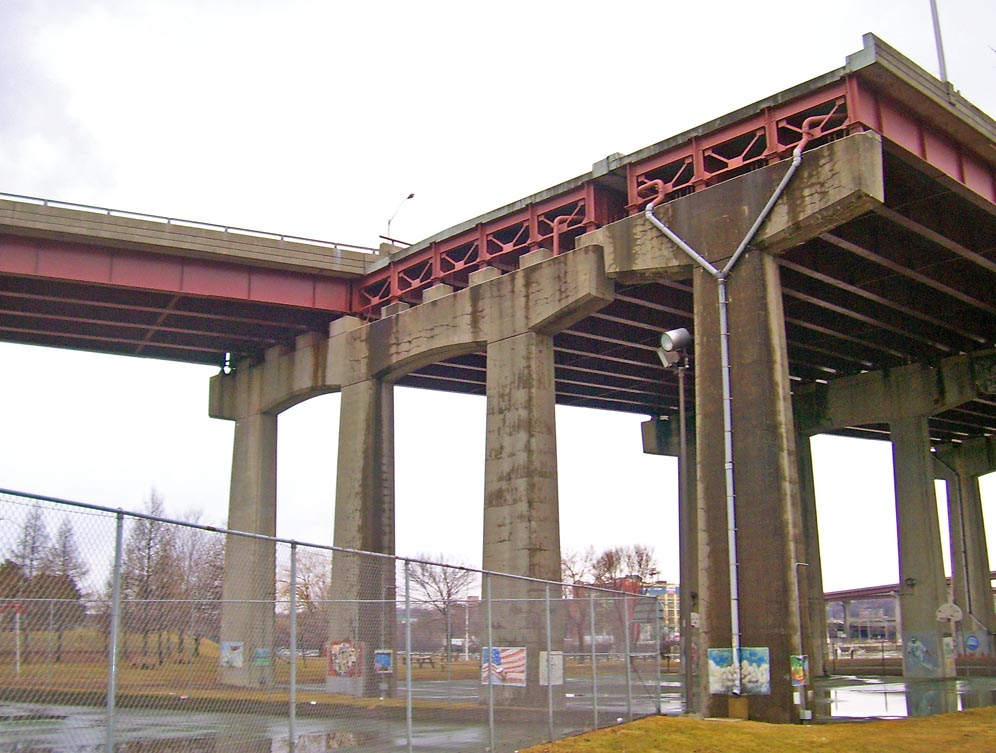
Stubs at the eastern end of the Dunn Memorial Bridge in Rensselaer; the remains of the canceled expressway

In Albany, US 9 was planned to be upgraded to an expressway. It was to run west from the Dunn Memorial Bridge along the South Mall Arterial (cosigned with US 20), then north along the northern half of the Mid-Crosstown Arterial. The southern half would carry US 9W. The Mid-Crosstown Arterial would have begun at the junction of I-787 and the New York State Thruway, connect with the South Mall Arterial at an underground interchange at Washington Park, and continue north to a junction with I-90. The only portion that was actually constructed was in the vicinity of the I-90 interchange (exit 6), which opened in 1977.

In 1996, the Crescent Bridge was replaced.

The Latham Circle was rebuilt in 2002 to have true roundabout characteristics. Prior to the 2002 work, the accident rate at the circle was about one per week, but were of low severity. After the reconstruction the accident rate dropped by 60%. The work on the circle included improving pavement markings, narrowing the US 9 access roads entering and exiting the circle to one lane, realigning the approaches from NY 2, reconfiguring the lanes within the circle, and improving signage. This work won the New York State Department of Transportation the 2003 National Roadway Safety Award.

On July 27, 2005, a ramp leading to the Empire State Plaza split vertically, causing the roadbed to drop more than a foot. A section of the ramp, which at 89 feet (27 m) tall is the uppermost one connecting to the bridge, had slipped and come to rest on a concrete supporting pier. The Department of Transportation was alerted to the situation by a call from a commuter who had driven over the gap. Two steel towers were installed to support the ramp and it was later repaired.

Downtown Glens Falls was once a robust commercial center, but due to urban sprawl much of the city's commerce had vacated downtown in the latter part of the 20th century. In a determined effort to reattract business to the downtown area, the city secured funding for a reconstruction and streetscape project, which included the proposed roundabout to replace the inefficient five-way intersection with NY Route 9L. The intersection was rated by traffic engineers as having a Level of Service of "F" which is worst on a scale of "A" to "F". The city of Glens Falls began the public outreach process in 2004 to gauge citizens' support for the plan. Creighton Manning Engineering was contracted by the city to prepare final design plans of the roundabout. The city mayor noted that there were no banks at Bank Square and that it seemed contradictory to refer to a roundabout intersection as a square. As a result, the name Centennial Circle was chosen from among submissions to a name-the-roundabout contest, the name having been submitted by Diane and Jon Swanson of Queensbury. The roundabout opened to traffic on May 6, 2007. According to a 2008 study, the traffic volume of Centennial Circle has increased twenty percent compared to the intersection it replaced, while at the same time providing drivers with reduced wait times.

A study by the National Highway Traffic Safety Administration in 2009 found that US 9 was the deadliest highway in Dutchess County, with 47 fatal accidents on the road in the 1994–2008 period. Police in the town of Poughkeepsie blamed it on the increasing commercialization of US 9 south of the city of Poughkeepsie.

A reconstruction of the Annesville traffic circle to reduce flooding began in 2024. It is expected to be completed in 2026.

== Suffixed routes ==
US 9 has had 19 suffixed routes bearing 17 different designations. Most are still in place; however, nine have been removed or renumbered. All the routes were assigned as part of the 1930 renumbering of state highways in New York unless otherwise noted.

- NY 9A (47.49 mi or 76.43 km) is an alternate route of US 9 through Manhattan and Westchester County.
- NY 9B (5.97 mi or 9.61 km) is a spur in Clinton County linking US 9 in Chazy to US 11 in Rouses Point. It was assigned in the mid-1940s.
- The NY 9C designation has been used for two distinct highways:
  - The first NY 9C was an alternate route assigned to what is now US 9 between Albany and Round Lake in the 1920s. It became part of US 9 in the 1930 renumbering.
  - The second NY 9C was an alternate route of US 9 between Croton-on-Hudson and Peekskill, utilizing Mount Airy Road and Washington Street. The designation was eliminated in the early 1930s.
- NY 9D (25.21 mi or 40.57 km) is an alternate route of US 9 between the Bear Mountain Bridge and Wappingers Falls.
- NY 9E was a spur linking US 9 to NY 376 (near Dutchess County Airport, present-day Hudson Valley Regional Airport) in the vicinity of Wappingers Falls, Dutchess County. It was assigned c. 1933 and removed c. 1939. The route, named New Hackensack Road, is now designated as CR 104 by Dutchess County.
- NY 9F was an alternate route of US 9 between Poughkeepsie and Hyde Park in Dutchess County. It became part of NY 9G c. 1938.
- NY 9G (42.77 mi or 68.83 km) is an alternate route of US 9 from Poughkeepsie, Dutchess County, to Hudson, Columbia County.
- NY 9H (18.77 mi or 30.21 km) is an easterly alternate to US 9 between Bell Pond and Valatie. It was assigned c. 1932.
- NY 9J (22.38 mi or 36.02 km) is an alternate route of US 9 from Columbiaville to Rensselaer. NY 9J follows a more westerly alignment than US 9 to serve a series of communities along the Hudson River.
- NY 9K was an alternate route of US 9 between Saratoga Springs and Lake George. It was supplanted by an extended NY 9N in November 1953.
- NY 9L (18.54 mi or 29.84 km) is a loop off of US 9 between Glens Falls and Lake George in Warren County.
- NY 9M was a spur located along the east bank of the Schroon River in Warren County. It connected US 9 near Pottersville to NY 8 in Starbuckville. The route was assigned c. 1931 and removed c. 1939.
- NY 9N (143.13 mi or 230.35 km) is a lengthy alternate route of US 9 between Saratoga Springs and Keeseville. NY 9N is the longest suffixed route in New York.
- NY 9P (12.17 mi or 19.59 km) is a loop route connecting US 9 to Saratoga Lake southeast of Saratoga Springs. It was assigned c. 1936.
- NY 9R (3.21 mi or 5.17 km) is a short loop serving Colonie in northeast Albany County. It was assigned c. 1939.
- NY 9W, different from present US 9W, was an alternate route of US 9 between Elizabethtown and Keeseville. It was assigned in 1927 and renumbered to NY 9N in the 1930 renumbering.
- The NY 9X designation has been used for two distinct highways:
  - The first NY 9X was a loop route connecting US 9 to Saratoga Lake southeast of Saratoga Springs. It was assigned c. 1931 and renumbered to NY 9P c. 1936.
  - The second NY 9X was an alternate route of US 9 through New York City in the vicinity of the Harlem River. It was assigned in the mid-1930s and removed in the 1940s.

== Major intersections ==
County	Location	mi	km	Exit	Destinations	Notes
Hudson River		0.00	0.00	–	I-95 south / US 1-9 south (US 46 west) – New Jersey	Continuation into New Jersey at the river's center
Hudson River		0.00	0.00	George Washington Bridge (northbound toll in New Jersey)		
Manhattan	Washington Heights	0.43	0.69	1A	I-95 north (US 1 north) to I-87 / Harlem River Drive south / FDR Drive south	Northbound left exit and southbound entrance; northern end of I-95/US 1 concurrency
Manhattan	Washington Heights	0.43	0.69	Northern end of freeway section		
Manhattan	Washington Heights	0.49	0.79		NY 9A / Henry Hudson Parkway / Riverside Drive	Exit 14 on Henry Hudson Parkway
Manhattan	Inwood				To NY 9A / Henry Hudson Parkway	Access via Riverside Drive
Harlem River		3.20	5.15	Broadway Bridge		
The Bronx	Fieldston	5.23	8.42		NY 9A south / Henry Hudson Parkway – Manhattan, Yonkers	Southern end of NY 9A concurrency; exit 23 on Henry Hudson Parkway
Westchester	Yonkers	8.09	13.02		NY 9A north (Ashburton Avenue)	Northern end of NY 9A concurrency
Westchester	Dobbs Ferry				To Saw Mill River Parkway	Access via Ashford Avenue
Westchester	Tarrytown	17.00– 17.25	27.36– 27.76		I-87 / I-287 / New York Thruway – New York City, White Plains, Tappan Zee Bridge	No northbound access to I-87 north; exit 9 on I-87 / I-287 / Thruway
Westchester	Tarrytown	17.00– 17.25	27.36– 27.76		NY 119 east to I-87 north / I-287 west / New York Thruway north – Tappan Zee Bridge, Elmsford	Western terminus of NY 119; I-87/I-287 not signed southbound
Westchester	Sleepy Hollow	18.83	30.30		NY 448 east – Pleasantville	Western terminus of NY 448; former NY 117
Westchester	Town of Mount Pleasant	20.62	33.18		NY 117 east to Rockwood Road – Pleasantville	Interchange; western terminus of NY 117; access to Rockwood Road via Kendal Way
Westchester	Village of Ossining	24.31	39.12		NY 133 east – Millwood	Western terminus of NY 133
Westchester	Town of Ossining	26.05	41.92	Southern end of freeway section		
Westchester	Town of Ossining	26.05	41.92	–	NY 9A south – Briarcliff Manor	No southbound entrance; southern end of NY 9A concurrency
Westchester	Town of Ossining			–	Croton River Road	Northbound exit and entrance; former routing of US 9
Westchester	Croton-on-Hudson	26.70	42.97	–	Croton Point Avenue – Croton–Harmon Station	
Westchester	Croton-on-Hudson	26.57	42.76	–	NY 9A north / NY 129 east	Northern end of NY 9A concurrency; western terminus of NY 129
Westchester	Town of Cortlandt	30.07	48.39	–	NY 9A – Montrose, Buchanan	Hamlet of Crugers; former routing of US 9
Westchester	Peekskill	33.09	53.25	–	NY 9A south / Welcher Avenue	NY 9A not signed northbound; northern terminus of NY 9A
Westchester	Peekskill	33.60	54.07	–	Louisa Street – Charles Point	
Westchester	Peekskill	34.20	55.04	–	South Street / Hudson Avenue	South Street signed as Lower South Street southbound
Westchester	Peekskill	34.49	55.51	–	US 6 east / US 202 east / NY 35 east (Main Street)	Southern end of US 6/US 202 concurrency; western terminus of NY 35
Westchester	Peekskill	35.08	56.46	Northern end of freeway section		
Westchester	Peekskill	35.08	56.46		Bear Mountain State Parkway east to Taconic State Parkway	Western terminus of Bear Mountain Parkway
Westchester	Town of Cortlandt	35.20	56.65		US 6 west / US 202 west / Palisades Parkway – Bear Mountain, Camp Smith, Bear Mountain Bridge US 6 Alt. begins / US 202 Alt. begins	Annsville Circle; northern end of US 6/US 202 concurrency; eastern terminus of US 6 Alt./US 202 Alt.
Westchester	Town of Cortlandt	36.05	58.02		Highland Avenue	Interchange; southbound exit and northbound entrance
Putnam	Philipstown	39.18	63.05		NY 403 north / US 6 Alt. west / US 202 Alt. west to Palisades Parkway / I-87 / New York Thruway – Bear Mountain Bridge, Garrison	Northern end of US 6 Alt./US 202 Alt. concurrency; southern terminus of NY 403
Putnam	Philipstown	45.59	73.37		NY 301 to Taconic State Parkway – Cold Spring, Carmel	Serves Cold Spring station
Dutchess	Town of Fishkill	52.14	83.91		I-84 to I-87 / New York Thruway / Taconic State Parkway – Beacon, Newburgh, Brewster, Danbury	Exit 46 on I-84
Dutchess	Village of Fishkill	53.06	85.39		NY 52 to I-84 / Taconic State Parkway – Beacon, Carmel	
Dutchess	Wappingers Falls	57.63	92.75		CR 104 east (New Hackensack Road) – Dutchess County Airport	Former NY 9E
Dutchess	Town of Poughkeepsie	58.94	94.85		NY 9D south / CR 77 north – Wappingers Falls	Northern terminus of NY 9D; southern terminus of CR 77
Dutchess	Town of Poughkeepsie	61.89	99.60		NY 113 east (Spackenkill Road) – Red Oaks Mill, IBM	Interchange; western terminus of NY 113; hamlet of Spackenkill
Dutchess	City of Poughkeepsie	63.38	102.00	Southern end of freeway section		
Dutchess	City of Poughkeepsie	64.09	103.14	–	Academy Street / South Avenue	
Dutchess	City of Poughkeepsie	64.42	103.67	–	Fox Street / Prospect Street	
Dutchess	City of Poughkeepsie	64.80	104.29	–	Rinaldi Boulevard / Columbia Street	
Dutchess	City of Poughkeepsie	65.10	104.77	–	Laurel Street / Rinaldi Boulevard / Main Street	Southbound exit and northbound entrance; serves Poughkeepsie station
Dutchess	City of Poughkeepsie	65.25	105.01	–	US 44 / NY 55 (Mid-Hudson Bridge/Church Street) to US 9W / I-87 / New York Thruway / Taconic State Parkway	Some movements via center median u-turns
Dutchess	City of Poughkeepsie	65.46	105.35	–	Rinaldi Boulevard / Main Street	Northbound exit and southbound entrance; serves Poughkeepsie station
Dutchess	City of Poughkeepsie	65.80	105.89	–	Albany Street	Northbound exit only
Dutchess	City of Poughkeepsie	66.20	106.54	–	Water Street	Southbound exit only; serves Poughkeepsie station
Dutchess	City of Poughkeepsie	66.30	106.70	Northern end of freeway section		
Dutchess	Town of Poughkeepsie	66.57	107.13		NY 9G north (Washington Street)	Southern terminus of NY 9G; formerly NY 9F
Dutchess	Village of Rhinebeck	81.51	131.18		NY 308 east to Taconic State Parkway	Western terminus of NY 308; serves Rhinecliff station
Dutchess	Town of Rhinebeck	83.85	134.94		NY 9G to I-87 / New York Thruway – Kingston Bridge, Germantown	
Dutchess	Village of Red Hook	86.80	139.69		NY 199 to I-87 / New York Thruway / Taconic State Parkway – Pine Plains, Kingston Bridge	
Columbia	Town of Livingston	101.50	163.35		NY 9H north / NY 23 east / NY 82 south to Taconic State Parkway – Albany	Southern end of NY 23 concurrency; southern terminus of NY 9H; northern terminus of NY 82
Columbia	Greenport	104.13	167.58		NY 23 west to I-87 / New York Thruway – Rip Van Winkle Bridge	Northern end of NY 23 concurrency; northern terminus of CR 31
Columbia	Hudson	107.14	172.43		NY 9G south / NY 23B west	Southern end of NY 23B concurrency; northern terminus of NY 9G
Columbia	Hudson	107.64	173.23		NY 23B east / NY 66 north	Northern end of NY 23B concurrency; southern terminus of NY 66
Columbia	Stockport	113.75	183.06		NY 9J north – Stuyvesant	Southern terminus of NY 9J
Columbia	Valatie	120.48	193.89		NY 9H – Claverack	Interchange
Columbia	Valatie	121.16	194.99		To NY 203 – Chatham	Access via NY 980B; former NY 22
Columbia	Town of Kinderhook	122.23	196.71		NY 9H south – Claverack, Rip Van Winkle Bridge	Roundabout; northern terminus of NY 9H
Rensselaer	Schodack	126.88	204.19		I-90 to New York Thruway / I-87 – New York, Albany, Boston	Exit 12 on I-90
Rensselaer	Schodack	131.23	211.19		US 20 east – Nassau, Pittsfield	Southern end of US 20 concurrency
Rensselaer	Schodack	131.43	211.52		NY 150 – Castleton, East Schodack, West Sand Lake	Hamlet of Schodack Center
Rensselaer	Schodack	132.09	212.58		I-90 – Albany, Boston	Exit 11 on I-90
Rensselaer	Schodack	133.45	214.77		Miller Road (NY 912F east) to I-90	
Rensselaer	Town of East Greenbush	135.26	217.68		US 4 north – Troy	Southern terminus of US 4; hamlet of East Greenbush
Rensselaer	Rensselaer	138.09	222.23		NY 9J south – Castleton, Port of Rensselaer	Interchange; northern terminus of NY 9J
Rensselaer	Rensselaer	138.91	223.55		NY 151 east / Broadway – Rail Station	Interchange; southbound exit and northbound entrance; NY 151 not signed
Hudson River		139.25	224.10	Dunn Memorial Bridge		
Albany	Albany	139.32– 139.87	224.21– 225.10		I-787 / US 20 west / NY 32 (South Pearl Street) to I-87 (I-87) / New York Thruway – Troy, Empire Plaza	Interchange; northern end of US 20 concurrency; access to Empire Plaza via South Mall Arterial
Albany	Albany	140.54	226.18		NY 32 (North Pearl Street)	One-block concurrency with NY 32 southbound
Albany	Albany	141.20	227.24		US 9W south (Lark Street)	Northern terminus of US 9W
Albany	Albany	141.53	227.77	Southern end of freeway section		
Albany	Albany	142.20– 143.17	228.85– 230.41	–	I-90 – Buffalo, Boston	Stack interchange; exit 6 on I-90
Albany	Albany	142.63	229.54	–	Northern Boulevard (NY 377 north)	Southbound exit and northbound entrance; southern terminus of NY 377
Albany	Albany	142.99	230.12	Northern end of freeway section		
Albany	Town of Colonie	144.70	232.87		NY 378 east (Menands Road) / CR 154 west (Old Niskayuna Road)	Western terminus of NY 378; eastern terminus of CR 154; hamlet of Loudonville
Albany	Town of Colonie	147.00	236.57		NY 155 to I-87 – Albany Airport, Watervliet	Hamlet of Latham
Albany	Town of Colonie	147.79	237.84		NY 2 – Watervliet, Schenectady	Grade-separated interchange with Latham Circle
Albany	Town of Colonie	148.46	238.92		NY 7 east – Troy	Interchange
Albany	Town of Colonie	148.82	239.50		I-87 / NY 7 west / NY 9R north – Saratoga, Cohoes	Exit 7 on I-87; southern terminus of NY 9R
Albany	Town of Colonie	150.39	242.03		NY 9R south (Boght Road)	Northern terminus of NY 9R; hamlet of Boght Corners
Albany	Town of Colonie	152.8	245.9		CR 159 / Crescent Road / Mohawk Towpath Scenic Byway – Cohoes	
Mohawk River		153.08	246.36		Crescent Bridge	
Saratoga	Town of Halfmoon	153.26	246.65		Crescent–Vischer Ferry Road (NY 911P west) / Mohawk Towpath Scenic Byway to I-87	Hamlet of Crescent
Saratoga	Town of Halfmoon	153.3	246.7		CR 99 / Church Hill Road / Mohawk Towpath Scenic Byway North branch – Waterford	
Saratoga	Town of Halfmoon	154.14	248.06		NY 236 north – Mechanicville	Southern terminus of NY 236
Saratoga	Town of Halfmoon	155.06	249.54		CR 91 west (Grooms Road) / CR 94 east (Guideboard Road) to I-87 – Waterford	Eastern terminus of CR 91 and Western terminus of CR 94
Saratoga	Town of Halfmoon	156.57	251.97		NY 146 to I-87 – Schenectady, Mechanicville	
Saratoga	Town of Clifton Park	159.67	256.96		Ushers Road (NY 911T west) to I-87	Hamlet of Ushers
Saratoga	Round Lake	162.91	262.18		NY 67 east / Round Lake Bypass (NY 915J) to I-87 south – Mechanicville	Roundabout; southern end of NY 67 concurrency
Saratoga	Town of Malta	165.17	265.82		NY 67 west / CR 108 east to I-87	Northern end of NY 67 concurrency; hamlet of Malta
Saratoga	Town of Malta	166.15	267.39		NY 9P north – Saratoga Lake	Southern terminus of NY 9P
Saratoga	Town of Malta	168.04	270.43		I-87	Exit 13 on I-87
Saratoga	Saratoga Springs	171.84	276.55		NY 50 south (Ballston Avenue) / Circular Street	Southern end of NY 50 concurrency; no northbound left turn
Saratoga	Saratoga Springs	172.13	277.02		NY 9P south (Spring Street)	Northern terminus of NY 9P
Saratoga	Saratoga Springs	172.16	277.06		NY 29 west (Washington Street)	Southern end of NY 29 concurrency
Saratoga	Saratoga Springs	172.39	277.43		NY 9N north / NY 29 east (Lake Avenue/Church Street)	Northern end of NY 29 concurrency; southern terminus of NY 9N
Saratoga	Saratoga Springs	173.36	279.00		NY 50 north / NY 9P Truck north / NY 29 Truck east to I-87 – Albany, Gansevoort	Northern end of NY 50 concurrency
Saratoga	Moreau	184.41	296.78		I-87 – Albany, Lake George	Exit 17 on I-87
Saratoga	Moreau	185.88	299.14		NY 197 east – Fort Edward, Hudson Falls, Rutland, VT	Western terminus of NY 197
Saratoga	South Glens Falls	189.13	304.38		NY 32 south – Gansevoort	Southern end of NY 32 concurrency
Hudson River		190.32	306.29		Cooper's Cave Bridge	
Warren	Glens Falls	190.62	306.77		NY 9L north (Ridge Street) / NY 32 north (Warren Street) / Hudson Avenue to I-87	Centennial Circle; northern end of NY 32 concurrency; southern terminus of NY 9L
Warren	Queensbury	192.70	310.12		NY 254 to I-87 – Hudson Falls, Airport	
Warren	Queensbury	195.23	314.19		NY 149 west (CR 23) to I-87 south	Southern end of NY 149 concurrency
Warren	Queensbury	195.52	314.66		I-87 north	Exit 20 on I-87
Warren	Queensbury	196.15	315.67		NY 149 east – Fort Ann, Whitehall, Rutland, VT	Northern end of NY 149 concurrency
Warren	Town of Lake George	198.58	319.58		NY 9N south to I-87 – Lake Luzerne	Southern end of NY 9N concurrency
Warren	Town of Lake George	198.92	320.13		NY 9L south – Dunham Bay	Northern terminus of NY 9L
Warren	Town of Lake George	199.05	320.34		Prospect Mountain Veterans Memorial Highway north (NY 917A) – Prospect Mountain	
Warren	Village of Lake George	200.45	322.59		NY 9N north – Diamond Point, Bolton Landing	Northern end of NY 9N concurrency
Warren	Village of Lake George	200.69	322.98		To I-87	Access via NY 912Q
Warren	Town of Lake George	204.95	329.84		I-87 / CR 35 east – Diamond Point, Bolton Landing	Exit 23 on I-87
Warren	Warrensburg	205.76	331.14		NY 418 west – Thurman, Stony Creek	Eastern terminus of NY 418; hamlet of Warrensburg
Warren	Warrensburg	209.14	336.58		NY 28 south – North Creek	Northern terminus of NY 28
Warren	Chester	217.79	350.50		Landon Hill Road (NY 8 north) / CR 68 north – Hague	Southern end of NY 8 concurrency; hamlet of Chestertown
Warren	Chester	221.59	356.61		NY 8 south – Wevertown	Northern end of NY 8 concurrency
Warren	Chester	226.33	364.24		To I-87 south	Access via Valley Farm Road; hamlet of Pottersville
Warren	Chester	227.16	365.58		To I-87 north	Access via Stone Bridge Road; hamlet of Pottersville
Essex	Schroon	231.05	371.84		To I-87 south	Access via NY 915F
Essex	Schroon	237.99	383.01		NY 74 east / I-87 – Ticonderoga	Exit 28 on I-87; western terminus of NY 74
Essex	North Hudson	244.21	393.02		To I-87 – Blue Ridge	Access via NY 910K; hamlet of North Hudson
Essex	North Hudson	253.83	408.50		I-87	Exit 30 on I-87
Essex	Town of Elizabethtown	255.59	411.33		NY 73 west – Lake Placid, Whiteface Mountain, Keene Valley, Keene	Eastern terminus of NY 73
Essex	Town of Elizabethtown	265.53	427.33		NY 9N north – Keene, Lake Placid	Southern ebd of NY 9N concurrency; hamlet of Elizabethtown
Essex	Town of Elizabethtown	266.00	428.09		NY 9N south to I-87 – Westport	Northern end of NY 9N concurrency; hamlet of Elizabethtown
Essex	Chesterfield	283.31	455.94		NY 22 south to I-87	Southern end of NY 22 concurrency; access to I-87 via NY 915K
Clinton	Au Sable	287.88	463.30		NY 9N south / NY 22 north to I-87 – Au Sable Forks, Whiteface Mountain	Northern end of NY 22 concurrency; northern terminus of NY 9N; hamlet of Keeseville
Essex	Chesterfield	289.51	465.92		NY 373 east – Port Kent	Western terminus of NY 373
Ausable River		290.88	468.13		Carpenter's Flats Bridge	
Clinton	Town of Peru	292.41	470.59		NY 442 west to I-87 / A-15	Eastern terminus of NY 442
Clinton	City of Plattsburgh	302.82	487.34		NY 3 west (Cornelia Street)	Eastern terminus of NY 3
Clinton	Town of Plattsburgh	304.86	490.62		NY 314 to I-87 – Ferry	
Clinton	Beekmantown	308.7	496.8		CR 22 (Point Au Roche Road) / Lakes to Locks Passage	
Clinton	Beekmantown	309.07	497.40		CR 58 west (Spellman Road)	Former NY 456
Clinton	Town of Chazy	316.51	509.37		CR 23 west to I-87 – Sciota	Former NY 191; hamlet of Chazy
Clinton	Town of Champlain	319.72	514.54		NY 9B north / CR 21 west / Lakes to Locks Passage – Rouses Point	Southern terminus of NY 9B
Clinton	Village of Champlain	322.94	519.72		US 11 to I-87 – Mooers, Rouses Point	
Clinton	Village of Champlain	324.16	521.68		To I-87 south	Access via NY 972D
Clinton	Town of Champlain	324.72	522.59		I-87 north to A-15 north – Canada, Montreal	Northern terminus; exit 43 on I-87
1.000 mi = 1.609 km; 1.000 km = 0.621 mi: Concurrency terminus; Electronic toll collection; Incomplete access

== See also ==
U.S. Route 9
Previous state: New Jersey	New York	Next state: Terminus
