= CME =

CME. or cme, can refer to any of the following:

== Organizations ==
- Canadian Military Engineers, the military engineer branch of the Canadian Forces
- Central European Media Enterprises, a media and entertainment group
- Central Music Company (CME), Beijing, China
- Christian Methodist Episcopal Church, a historically black denomination of Methodism, formerly called "Colored Methodist Episcopal Church"
- CME Group, a financial securities exchange services and information firm
  - Chicago Mercantile Exchange, a financial and commodity derivative exchange, owned by CME Group
- College of Military Engineering, Pune, a training institution of the Indian Army Corps of Engineers
- Columbia Music Entertainment, former name for Nippon Columbia, a record label in Tokyo, Japan
- Conseil Mondial de l'Eau, the World Water Council, an international think-tank focused on water issues
- Creighton Manning Engineering, a civil engineering firm in Albany, New York

== Physiology and medicine ==
- Chief medical examiner, common official title of a coroner
- Continuing medical education
- Clathrin-mediated endocytosis, another name for receptor-mediated endocytosis (RME)
- Cystoid macular edema, an eye disorder also known as Irvine–Gass syndrome

== Science and technology ==
- Chiral magnetic effect, generation of electric current along an external magnetic field induced by chirality imbalance
- Concurrent Machine Environment, a computing environment supporting ICL Direct Machine Environment
- Coronal mass ejection, a massive burst of stellar wind and other ejecta from a star

== Transport ==
- Chief mechanical engineer, the chief officer of a railway responsible for locomotives and rolling stock
- Castlemaine railway station, Australia
- Ciudad del Carmen International Airport (IATA code), Campeche, Mexico
- Combe railway station (National Rail code) in the county of Oxfordshire, UK
- Prince Edward Air (ICAO code), a defunct airline based on Prince Edward Island, Canada

== Other uses ==
- cme, the ISO 639-3 code for the Cerma language spoken in Burkina Faso
- CME, the ITU country code for Cameroon
