= Centennial Circle =

Roundabout in New york

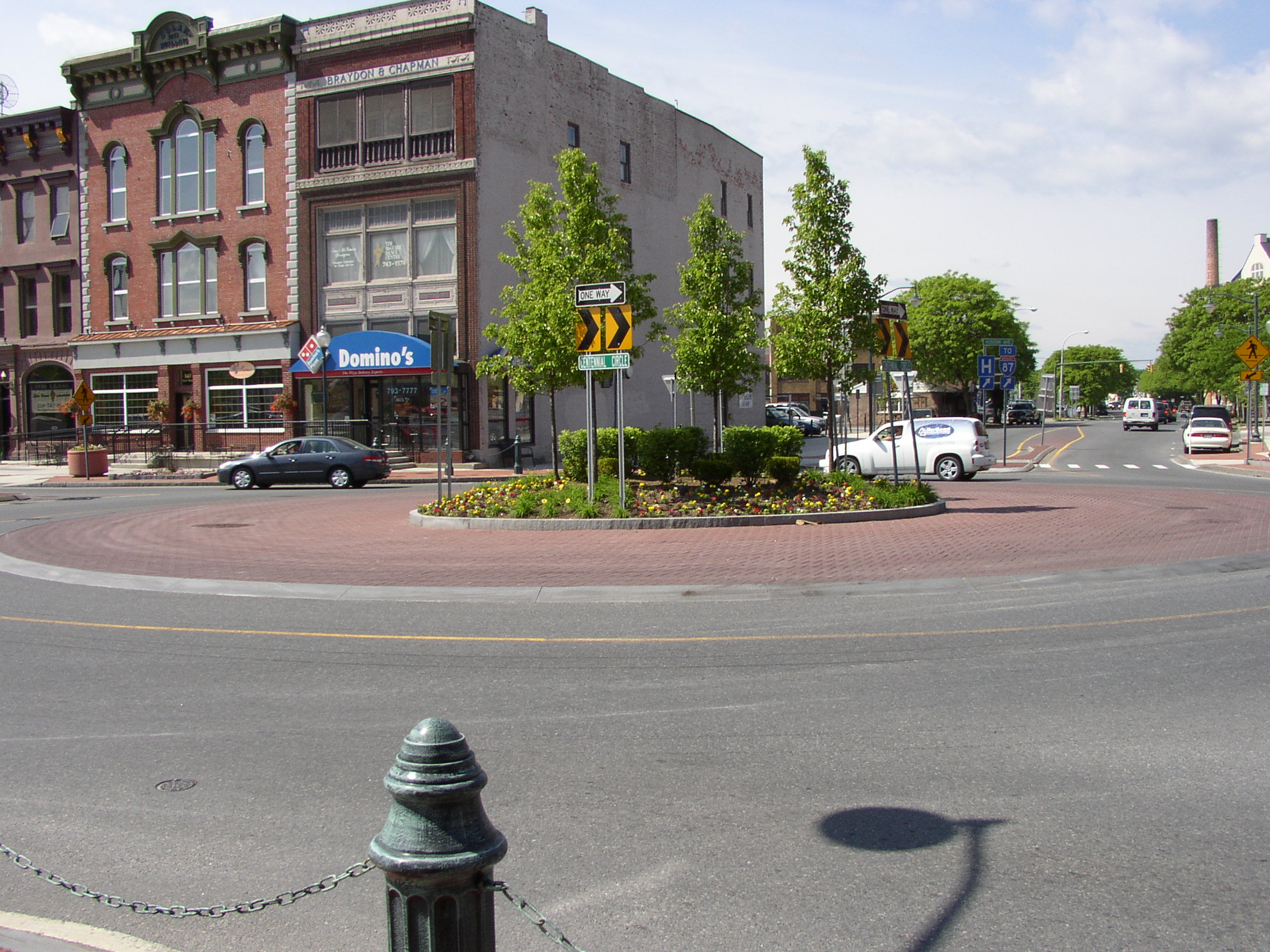
- Centennial Circle
- Interactive map of Centennial Circle

Location
- Glens Falls, New York
- Coordinates: 43°18′34.22″N 73°38′38.44″W
- Roads at junction: US 9 (Glen Street); NY 9L (Ridge Street); NY 32 (Warren Street); Hudson Street

Construction
- Type: Roundabout
- Opened: May 7, 2007

Centennial Circle is a five leg roundabout in downtown Glens Falls, a city in Warren County, New York. The circle is at the intersection of U.S. Route 9 (Glen Street), New York State Route 32 (NY 32, named Warren Street), NY 9L (Ridge Street) and Hudson Street. Centennial Circle is the site of a formerly signalized intersection, which was replaced with the current layout in 2007.

== History ==
In 1873, the intersection — then consisting of Warren, Ridge and Glen Streets — became known as Fountain Square on account of an ornate fountain having been built in front of the Rockwell House. This fountain was removed, however, in 1898 to make room for brick street paving and a trolley line. Thus lacking the fountain, the name was changed to Bank Square because the then–village's three banks were located in this area.

Downtown Glens Falls was once a robust commercial center, but due to urban sprawl much of the city's commerce had vacated downtown in the latter part of the 20th century. In a determined effort to reattract business to the downtown area, the city secured funding for a reconstruction and streetscape project, which included the proposed roundabout to replace the inefficient five-way intersection. The intersection was rated by traffic engineers as having a Level of Service of "F" which is worst on a scale of "A" to "F".

The city of Glens Falls began the public outreach process in 2004 to gauge citizens' support for the plan. Creighton Manning Engineering was contracted by the city to prepare final design plans of the roundabout. The city mayor noted that there were no banks at Bank Square and that it seemed contradictory to refer to a roundabout intersection as a square. As a result, the name Centennial Circle was chosen from among submissions to a name-the-roundabout contest, the name having been submitted by Diane and Jon Swanson of Queensbury.

The roundabout opened to traffic on May 6, 2007. According to a 2008 study, the traffic volume of Centennial Circle has increased twenty percent compared to the intersection it replaced, while at the same time providing drivers with reduced wait times.
