= Center for Middle Eastern Studies =

Center for Middle Eastern Studies may refer to:

- Center for Middle Eastern Studies at the University of California, Berkeley
- Center for Middle Eastern Studies at the University of Chicago
- Center for Middle Eastern Studies at Harvard University
- Center for Middle Eastern Studies at Lund University
