= High Sheldon Wind Farm =

Wind farm in Sheldon, New York

Coordinates: 42.729°N 78.393°W

Turbine construction

High Sheldon Wind Farm is located in Sheldon, New York USA in Wyoming County, about 30 miles southeast of Buffalo. Constructed in 2009 and operated by Invenergy, it has 75 units capable of 1.5 Mw each for a nameplate capacity of 112.5 megawatts, using General Electric 1.5sle turbines. The wind farm stirred controversy in the town over concerns of noise, visual pollution, and property values. For comparison in the 2020s, 15 to 20 megawatt turbines are being tested and installed globally.
