= Creighton Manning Engineering =

Creighton Manning Engineering, LLP
- Company type: Private
- Industry: Civil Engineering
- Founded: 1965
- Headquarters: Albany, New York
- Key people: Ed Woods, John Tozzi
- Services: Highway and bridge engineering, Site Engineering, Traffic Engineering, Transportation Planning, Construction Inspection, Surveying
- Number of employees: 50
- Website: http://www.cmellp.com

Creighton Manning Engineering, LLP is a multi-discipline civil engineering and surveying firm located in Albany, New York. The firm has been in business since 1965.

Creighton Manning Engineering claims to be one of the top 10 civil engineering firms in the Capital District. Creighton Manning Engineering was recently recognized as "One of the Great Places to Work in the Capital Region" through an independent survey conducted for the Business Review.

As of 2012, Creighton Manning has approximately 55 employees. Employees are of the following positions: project manager, civil engineer, surveyor, construction inspector and CAD drafters. Many of the firms engineers are professionally licensed as Professional Engineer.

== Notable projects ==
Highway Engineering

Slingerlands Bypass Roundabouts

- Luther Forest Technology Campus: Creighton Manning is the lead civil engineering consultant for the local Economic Development Corporation. Creighton Manning was responsible for the highway design and construction inspection of the site. The site is being prepared for construction of a chip fab plant by AMD.
- Slingerlands Bypass (New York State Route 85): Creighton Manning was the lead civil engineering consultant for the NYSDOT responsible for the design of the bypass, along with four roundabouts in order to ease traffic congestion in the area.
- NY Route 5 bus rapid transit: Creighton Manning is the lead civil engineering consultant on the Bus Rapid Transit (BRT) project for CDTA. In early 2008, the CDTA announced that it was going forward with the Bus Rapid Transit line on Route 5, which will include twenty upgraded stations. CME assisted with the transportation planning study that identified Route 5 as a possible candidate for BRT service. As of 2008, CDTA carries nearly 15 million passengers per year, with 20% on the Route 5 corridor.
- Centennial Circle, a five way roundabout in Glens Falls, NY. Creighton Manning inspected the construction of the roundabout, which was completed in 2007 at a cost of $9 million.

Site Engineering

High Sheldon Turbine Site

- Schenectady (Amtrak station): Creighton Manning is a partner in a current study to upgrade the Schenectady Train Station.
- High Sheldon Wind Farm: Creighton Manning was responsible for the design of both the off-site intersection improvements and proposed access road improvements.

== See also ==
- Civil engineer
- Infrastructure
- Highway engineering
- Structural engineering
- Construction surveying

Associations

- American Society of Civil Engineers
- Institute of Transportation Engineers
