= West Somers Methodist Episcopal Church and Cemetery =

Historic church in New York, United States

- U.S. National Register of Historic Places
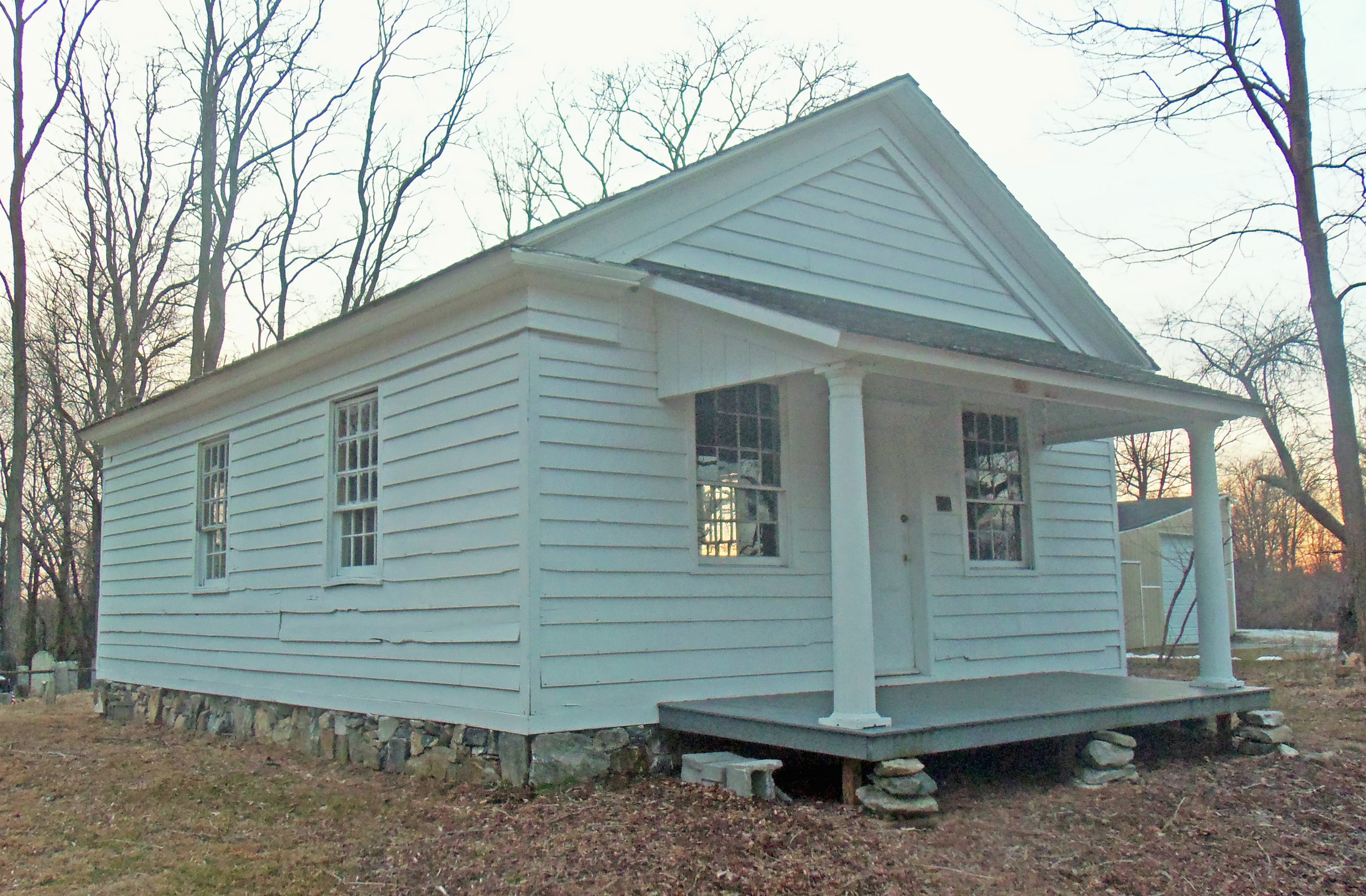
- South profile and east elevation, 2013

- Location within New York
- Location: Somers, NY
- Nearest city: Peekskill
- Coordinates: 41°19′51″N 73°45′3″W
- Area: 1.59 acres (6,400 m^{2})
- Built: c. 1837
- Architect: Thomas Tompkins Miller
- Architectural style: Greek Revival
- NRHP reference No.: 11000755
- Added to NRHP: October 25, 2011

The former West Somers Methodist Episcopal Church, also known as Tomahawk Chapel, is located on Tomahawk Street (part of New York State Route 118) in the town of Somers, New York, (Note: The area of Somers in which the property is located is in the ZIP Code for nearby Yorktown Heights and thus its address is sometimes given as being in that community.) United States. It is a small wooden building in the Greek Revival architectural style built in the 1830s. Also on its lot is the cemetery where many of the early members were buried. In 2011 the church, cemetery and the stone wall that surrounds them were listed on the National Register of Historic Places.

At the time of the church's construction, West Somers was a thriving agricultural community. Burials had begun in the cemetery almost a decade earlier; most of the area's congregants attended the established Mount Zion Methodist Church some distance away. One of West Somers's more prominent residents built the church so his neighbors would not always have to travel so far; it was so small that circus pioneer Hachaliah Bailey, also a Somers resident, likened it to a tiger's cage.

Throughout the rest of the 19th century the church was a cornerstone of the West Somers community, with itinerant ministers leading services in the absence of a pastor (according to the United Methodist Church, successor to the Methodist Episcopal Church, the church was never a recognized congregation within the larger denomination). Its Sunday school classes were for a long time the only educational opportunity available to area children. Members continued to be buried in the cemetery; more than half lived to be over 70, an unusually high number for that region and era.

Attendance and involvement declined in the early 20th century as West Somers felt the effects of suburbanization and the taking of large tracts of local land to create the reservoirs of the New York City water supply system. By the 1950s the church building had suffered such severe decline and neglect that its porch columns had to be replaced. Further restoration and renovation, including moving the church from its original site in the early 21st century, preceded the building's listing on the National Register.

== Buildings and grounds ==
The former church building and cemetery occupy a 1.59-acre (6,400 m^{2}) lot on the west side of Tomahawk, midway between the hamlets of Granite Springs at Amawalk Reservoir a half-mile to the south and Baldwin Place at the Westchester–Putnam county line to the north. To its north and south are houses on large lots; across the road and slightly to the south is a bar surrounded by a parking lot. On the west is the 66.5-acre (26.9 ha) town-owned Koegel Park, through which the North County Trailway passes. The headwaters of the Muscoot River are beyond.

Like the park, the surrounding area is predominantly wooded, with some areas such as backyards and the immediate vicinity of the church cleared; this becomes more extensive to the church lot's north. The terrain is gently hilly, with the church's lot a small rise between the road and the 668-foot (204 m) hill at the center of the park. To the east the land slopes more steeply to the hamlet of Shenorock and the headwaters of a short unnamed tributary of the Muscoot that, along with nearby Lake Shenorock, drains into the reservoir.

=== Church ===
The church building itself is a 22-by-32-foot (6.7 by 9.8 m) wood frame clapboard-sided structure on an exposed concrete block foundation faced in stone. It is topped by a shingled front-gabled roof. On each facade are two 12-over-8 double-hung sash windows, not symmetrically placed.

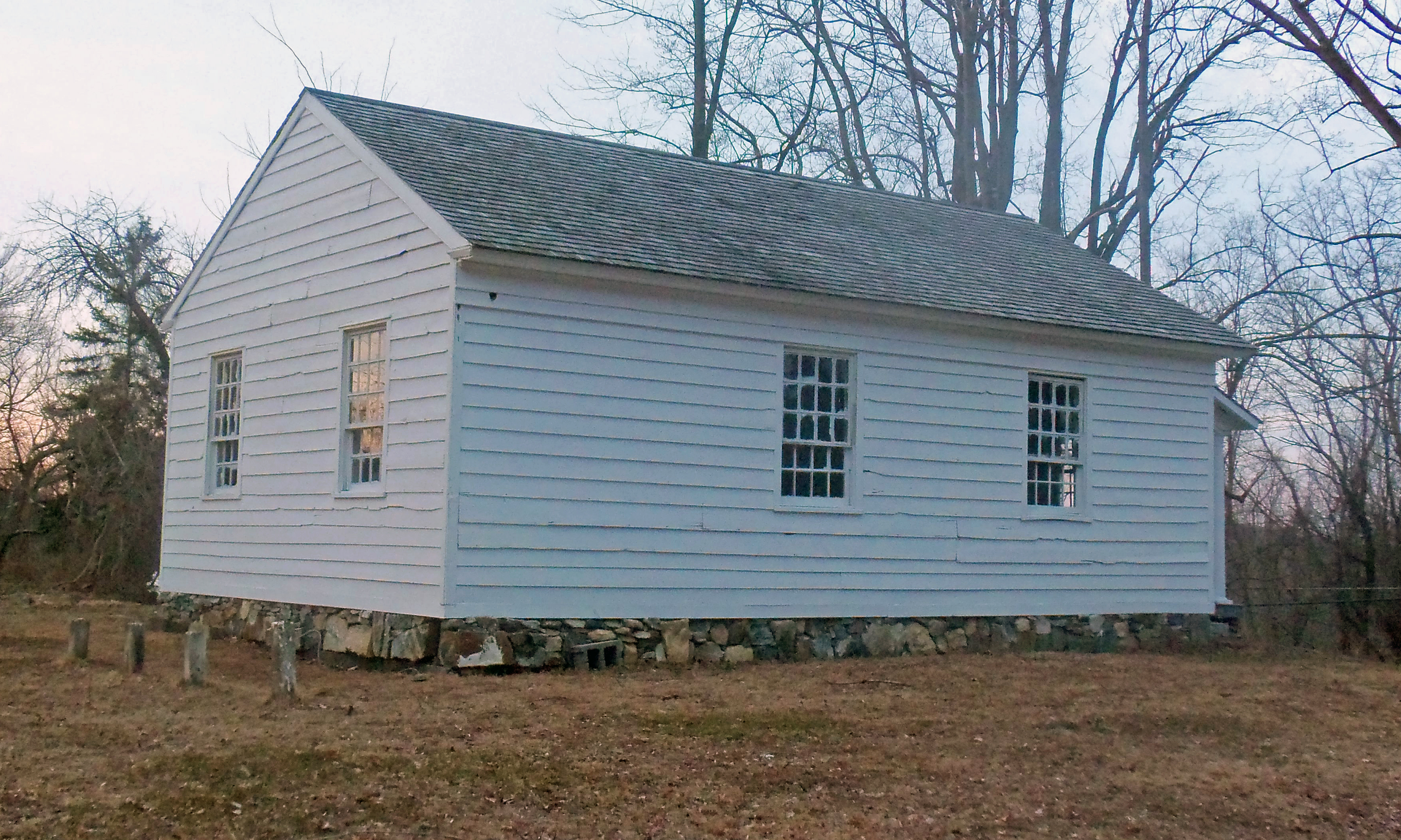
Rear view

On the church's east (front) facade is a 6 1/2-by-15 1/2-foot (2.0 by 4.7 m) shed-roofed porch. Several piles of loose stones help support the wooden deck. In turn, two smooth round wooden Doric columns support the shingled roof. Below the roofline's overhanging eave is a wide plain frieze.

A single wood-paneled door leads into the church's interior, with a wood floor and coved ceiling. Between them are plaster walls wainscoted with horizontal tongue and groove boards topped by molding at the windowsill level. In the walls are the original metal hardware for placing lanterns.

The original 14 straight high-backed wooden pews remain, angled towards the entrance and facing the pulpit, on a raised curved platform against the west wall, fronted by a communion rail. There is an opening for a stove (no longer extant) in the middle of the pews. In the center of the platform is a wooden lectern.

=== Cemetery ===
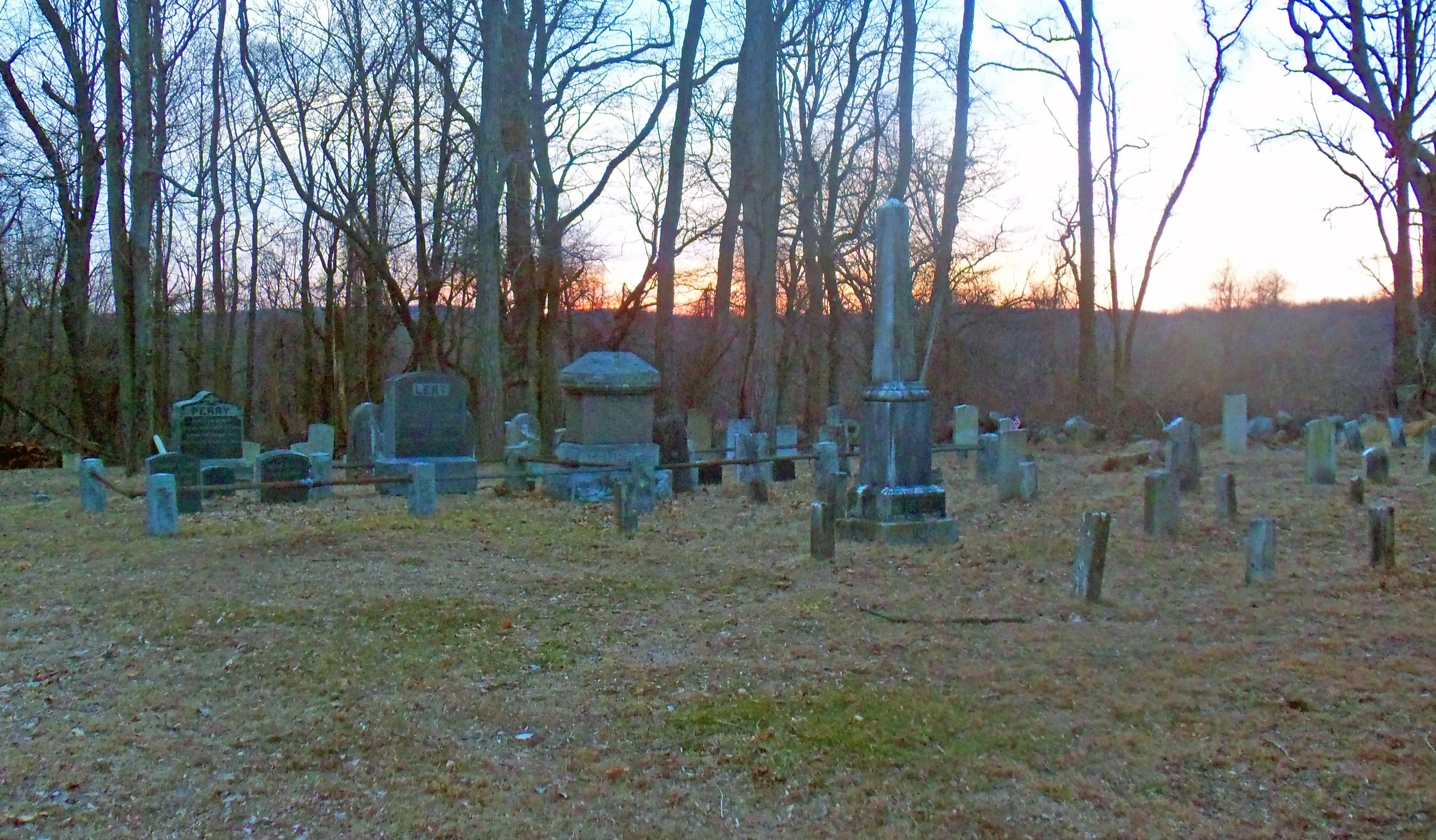
Larger of the two cemetery plots

To the west of the church building is the cemetery, really two plots that have grown together over the years. The most conspicuous is that of the Miller family, descended from church builder Thomas Tompkins Miller, located a short distance south of the church. It has a tall obelisk to Miller himself in the middle of a small area delineated by a tasseled iron railing on stone posts. The other plot is located due west of the church. It has some smaller monuments and family plots marked off by iron railings less elaborate than the Millers'.

In total there are 76 markers commemorating 95 burials. The earliest is a 10-month-old girl who died in 1831; the most recent burial took place in 1977. Many are members of the same families in groups; among them are eight veterans of wars from the Revolutionary War, War of 1812, Civil War, Spanish–American War and World War I. More than half were recorded to have been 70 or over at the time of their deaths, an unusually high longevity rate for the era and the region.

The markers themselves exhibit the evolution of funerary art during the 19th century. Many are marble or granite; they feature common tombstone motifs of the period such as willows and urns. Earlier markers use script lettering while later ones are in block. They also show the evolution in dating that took place over that time: on the older markers the deceased's date of death and exact age in years, months and days is given, while later ones simply give the span of life in birth and death years as has been common practice since.

== History ==
The church was built during the early settlement of northern Westchester County, a time when rapidly spreading Methodism was the predominant denomination among those who came to the area. It was most active in the decades after it was built, but suffered greatly after the Civil War. In the 20th and 21st centuries its history has primarily been one of preservation efforts.

=== 1800–1830: Settlement ===
Starting during the Revolution, settlers in search of good farmland began working their way up the Muscoot River from its confluence with the Croton River. (Note: Today at Muscoot Reservoir) Those who reached today's West Somers and cleared the lowlands around the river were rewarded with some of the most fertile soil along it. Good roads and the rivers of the time made it easy to ship their produce to the markets of New York City to the south.

By the early years of the 19th century the area had been totally settled. Industry joined the farmers along the banks of the river, using its hydraulic power for various kinds of milling. Somers then was one of Westchester County's economic centers, more populous than the county seat at White Plains. West Somers, where some of the earliest inhabitants had settled, had a general store and blacksmith's shop serving the farms and mills.

A post office was established in 1830. By then West Somers was a regular stop on livestock drives along the Peekskill–Danbury Turnpike, the predecessor road to today's U.S. Route 202 across the county. Thriving though it was, the community still lacked a house of worship.

At that time Methodism was the prevalent Protestant denomination in the area. The Mount Zion Methodist Church (also listed on the National Register), closer to the center of Somers today, was only the third Methodist church in the state when it was established and built in 1794. Many of the West Somers settlers went there for worship.

=== 1837–1863: Construction ===
In 1830 a schism in American Methodism over the issue of church governance led to the establishment of the Methodist Episcopal Church and the Methodist Protestant Church. The latter eschewed bishops and allowed local congregations greater say in their own affairs. It had more appeal to Americans of the era, and in 1837 a group called the Methodist Protestant Society of West Somers bought a half-acre (2,000 m^{2}) parcel on the present site for $100 ($3,000 in modern dollars) Thomas Tompkins Miller, a builder who was one of the society's trustees, a town justice of the peace and a descendant of one of the older families in West Somers, built the church himself.

There had already been some church activity in the area. A ten-month-old girl's 1831 burial is the oldest in the cemetery plots. Attendance books from that era kept by the Somers Historical Society suggest that Sunday school, an important part of Methodist ministry, had been held in West Somers starting as early as that year. For many local children it would be their only educational opportunity, as all other schools that existed at the time were too far away.

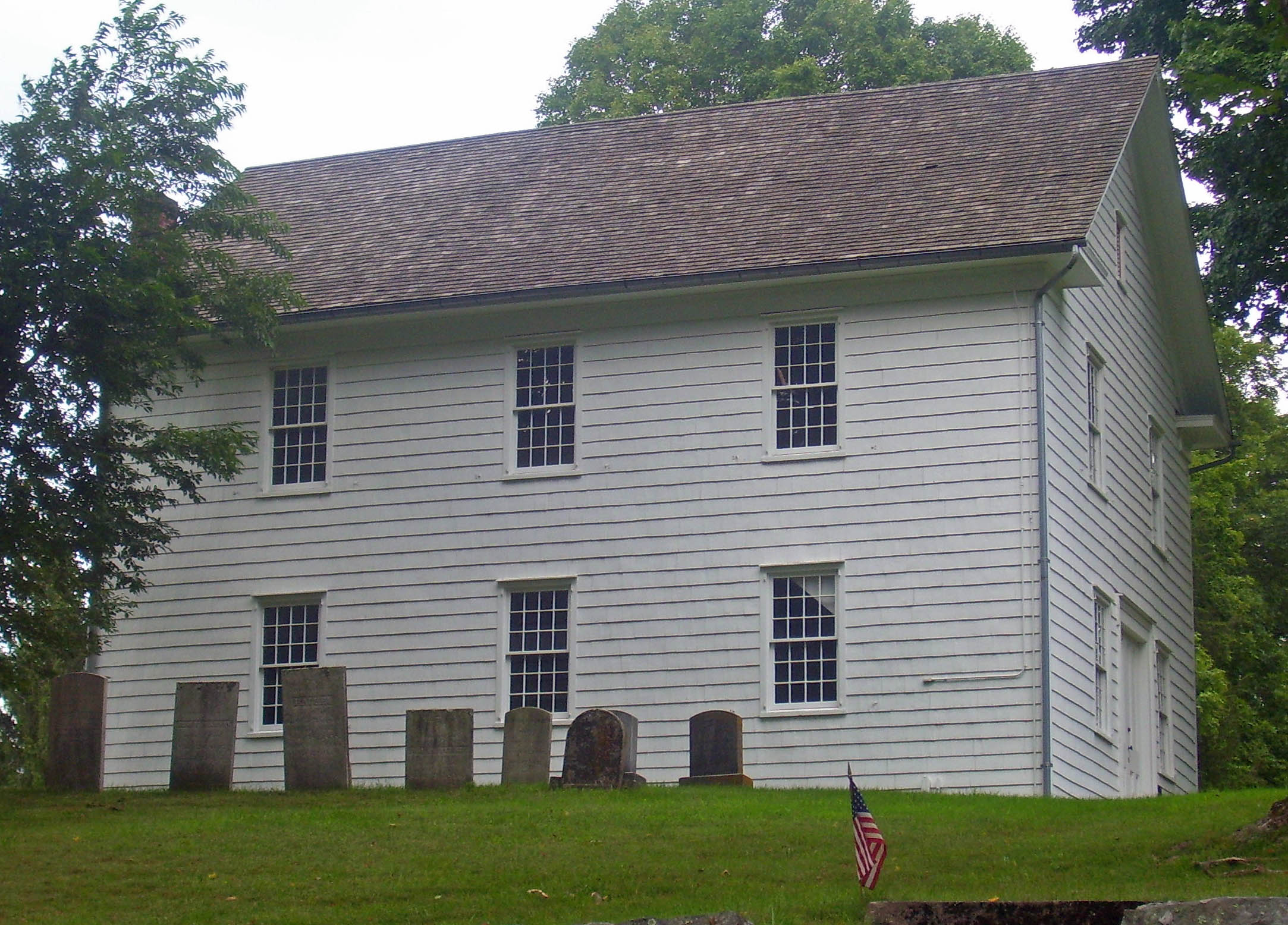
Mount Zion Methodist Church

Aesthetically the church reflects the exhortation of early Methodist bishop Francis Asbury, who frequently preached at Mount Zion, that the denomination's houses of worship should be "plain and decent, but no more expensive than absolutely unavoidable." Like the similarly austere Mount Zion, West Somers is an extremely restrained application of a contemporary neoclassical architectural style. At the time of its construction, it did not have the porch it presently does, although its roof was pierced by a single brick chimney that is no longer extant.

The small size of the church attracted some notice at the time. Due to its small size, and lack of a pastor, the church would later be locally known as the Tomahawk Chapel after the street it was on. Hachaliah Bailey, the Somers resident who pioneered the American circus by exhibiting an elephant at what is now known as the Elephant Hotel, observed that "Tom Miller is building a church no bigger than a tiger's cage."

There is no record that the church was ever assigned a pastor. Services were held by the many itinerant ministers in the area. Greater matters were handled through the more established churches in the area, such as the Yorktown-Croton Lake church in Pines Bridge.

In 1844, a further schism, this one over slavery, divided the Methodist Episcopal Church. The abolitionist Northern branch began to implement some of the same reforms in church governance that had caused the split with the Methodist Protestants 16 years earlier, and relations between the two began to thaw. In 1863, during the Civil War, West Somers changed its denomination to affiliate with the Northern Methodist Episcopal Church. The same year, it purchased the one-acre (4,000 m^{2}) lot next to the church with the intention of building a new church on it.

=== 1864–1910: Decline of congregation ===
After the war ended, the church went into decline. Older members died and were buried in the cemetery; younger ones left the area. They were not so easily replaced. Somers' early economic advantages had been offset when the railroads, which had begun extending themselves into Westchester during the 1840s, grew out having bypassed the town, and newcomers to the region settled where the tracks were. The planned new church was never built.

Shortly after the war the original West Somers Methodist Protestant Society, no longer sustainable due to its diminished numbers, turned the church property over to the Methodist Episcopal Society of the Cortlandt Circuit. They had the property surveyed for conversion into a cemetery in 1874, but never followed through with that project, and in 1877 gave it up. The Mount Zion Circuit took over.

In the last decades of the 19th century further changes in northern Westchester negatively affected the West Somers church. The railroads began to spur suburbanization, as city residents who originally spent their summers and weekends in the area began to realize that they could live there full-time and commute to their jobs in the city via train. The growing city, in need of water, began acquiring large tracts of land, sometimes including whole communities, in the area through eminent domain, reducing the total amount of land available for development and thus driving up the value of what remained. This induced many of the area's farmers, the population from which West Somers had grown, to sell their farms for subdivision and development.

Despite these developments, sometime around 1910 the porch was added to the church building. It did not have any effect on the building's use, as services already held sporadically at that time appear to have ceased completely afterwards, except for burials of descendants of members who wished to be buried with their families. Nevertheless, a 1930 photo shows the church still in relatively good condition and the surrounding property maintained.

=== 1910–present: Preservation and restoration ===
By 1953, however, the property had become neglected and fallen into serious disrepair. Some of the local families got together and restored it, raising money through a Grange fair. They were able to repaint the interior and exterior and replace the roof. In the process of the latter work they removed the chimney completely; a pile of bricks was found in the nearby woods during a later renovation. A neighboring couple cleaned up the landscaping and gravestones. Six years after this restoration, Thomas Miller's granddaughter Ruth was married to Ernest Pinckney, another descendant of an old West Somers family, in the church. It was the last ceremony held in the building; the last burial in the graveyard took place in 1977.

Local interest in the church did not wane. The Town of Somers acquired the building and surrounding cemetery in the 1970's. A local Eagle Scout did an inventory of the graves and markers for his project. The Somers Historical Society replaced the roof again; another Eagle Scout redid the interior walls as his project. These efforts culminated in 1984 with research into the church's history and ownership. As a result, the United Methodist Church formally transferred the church to the town two years later; its remaining records and some of its other artifacts were removed to the custody of the historical society, which has had responsibility for the site ever since.

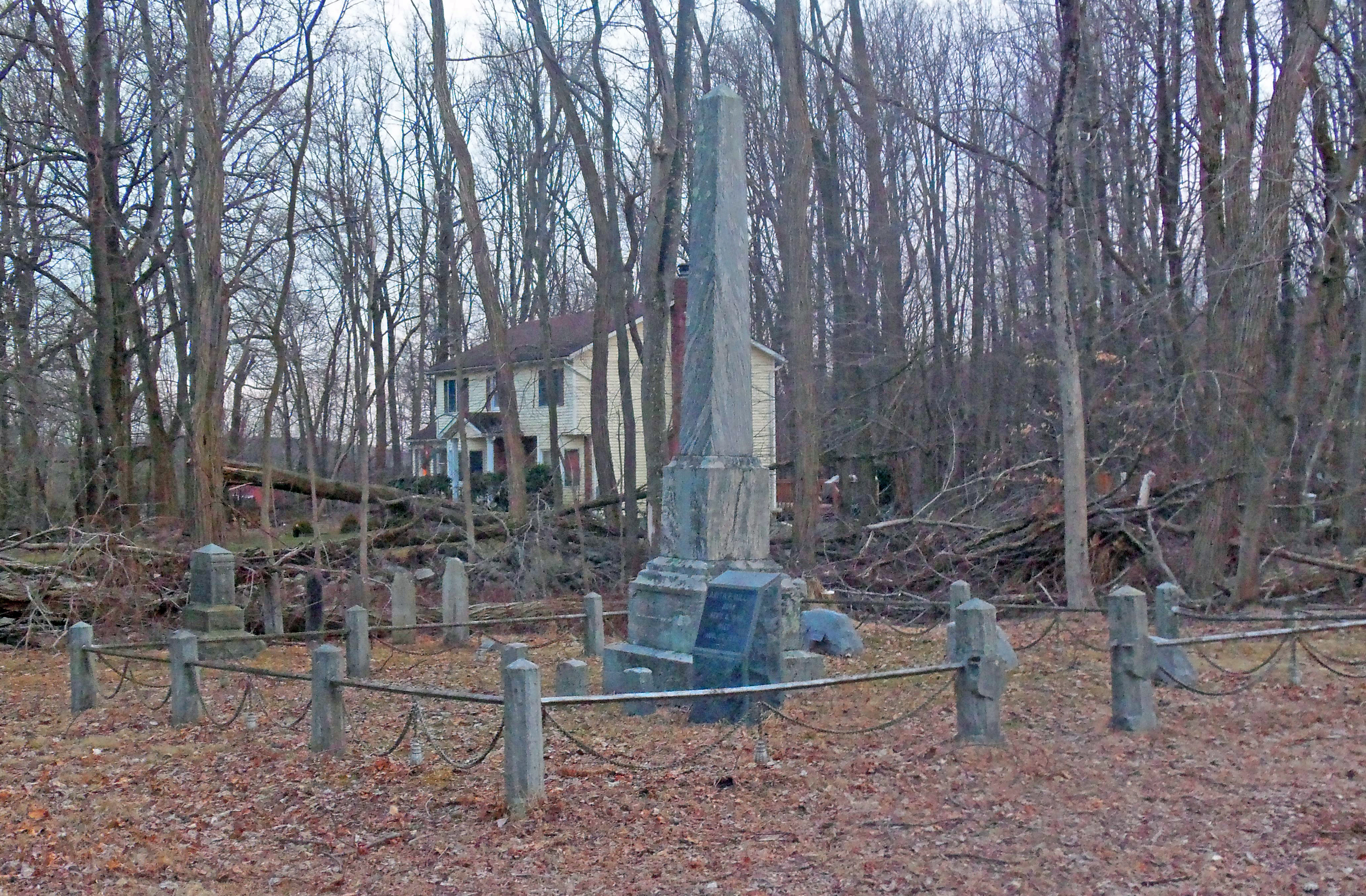
Miller family plot, with monument to Thomas Miller centrally located

Concern for the building did not end there and then. In 1989 another local architect who evaluated the church's condition recommended moving it off its foundation, as the existing one had seriously deteriorated, threatening the building's structural integrity. Two years later the building was moved to its current site, 22 feet (6.7 m) to the south of its original location. Its new foundation was made of concrete blocks faced in stone to maintain the building's historic appearance. Another Eagle Scout repainted the exterior walls again in 1995. Two years afterward, when Ruth Miller Pinckney died, her estate left a bequest for the maintenance of the family plot.

The following year, the porch columns were replaced. In 1999, a local couple who had just moved to Somers began exploring the town's historic sites. They found the West Somers church and cemetery heavily overgrown and "took pity on it." They once again cleared the overgrowth and did some work on the building, repainting the exterior walls and restoring its porch in 2006. Their research led to its listing on the National Register of Historic Places in 2011. The church and cemetery are owned by the Town of Somers, NY and maintained by the town's Historic Properties Board.

== See also ==
- National Register of Historic Places listings in northern Westchester County, New York
