= Seeing the elephant =

American figure of speech

The phrase "seeing the elephant" is an Americanism which refers to gaining experience of the world. It was a popular expression throughout the United States in the mid-to-late 19th century, notably during the Texan Santa Fe Expedition, Mexican–American War, California gold rush, and American Civil War, and on the westward expansion trails (the Oregon Trail, California Trail, Mormon Trail, etc.).

During the 20th century the phrase faded from popularity, but when historians first started taking note of its recurrence in historical newspapers, journals, and literature, they often incorrectly assumed it described a negative experience. Though negative emotions may have been prevalent among some people going to "see the elephant", more often it was initially paired with feelings of excitement: American pioneers of the Overland Trail wrote of the anticipation of heading west to "see the elephant". Elephant "sightings" often began with excitement and high ideals, only to ultimately prove disappointing or disenchanting. The high excitement followed by frustration epitomizes the "elephant" as something most wanted to "see" once, but few would have wanted to "see" again. Furthermore, early explorers used the phrase as a way to describe the experience of seeing something new.

== Origins ==
As early as 1590, the English used the idiom "seeing the lions", which is likely an ancestor to "seeing the elephant". This referred to the Tower of London, thought to have been one of the world's oldest zoos. English monarchs kept a menagerie of animals inside the Tower including several types of cats. Travelers and visitors were hopeful for a glimpse of the animals, especially the lion, which was considered the living emblem of the King of England.

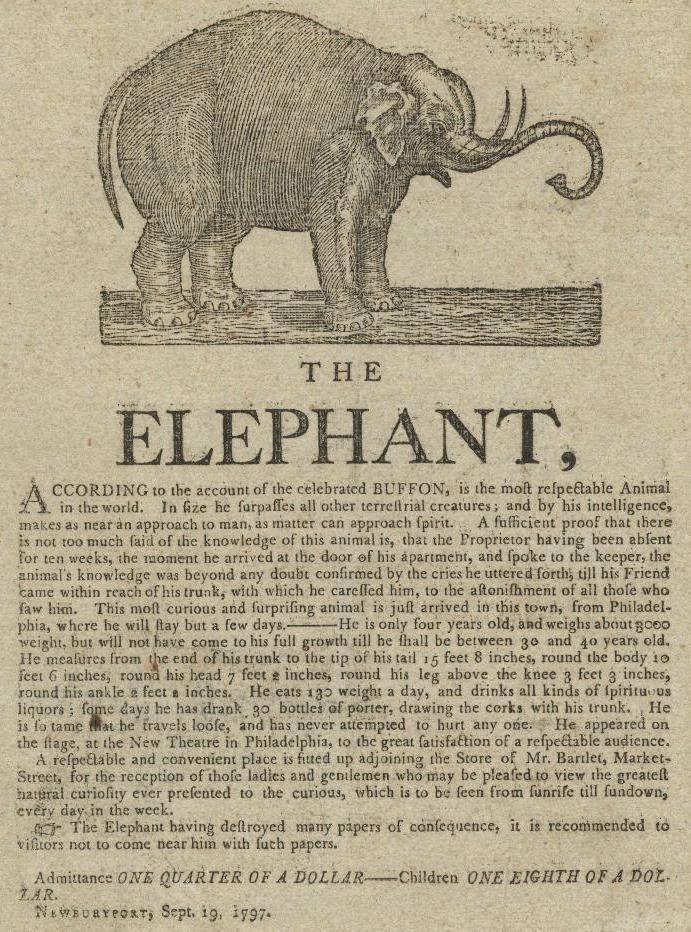
1797 advertisement for an elephant show touring the United States

The phrase may have taken on its American form in 1796 with exhibitor Jacob Crowninshield's Asian elephant display in New York City, at the corner of Beaver and Broadway. A young, eight-foot-tall animal was shipped from India to become the first live elephant exhibition in America. It drew visitors from as far as Pennsylvania and Virginia, making "I saw the elephant" into a famous claim of worldly experience.

The fixed exhibition gained such renown that, in 1808, Hachaliah Bailey purchased the first circus elephant, "Old Bet", from Jacob Crowninshield for one thousand dollars; and while this was a steep price tag, the hefty returns on his purchase allowed him to later invest in more animals. Old Bet traveled extensively with Bailey, who charged 25 cents to those curious to "see" the elephant.

The phrase was shown to have possibly gained widespread usage by the 1830s from the book Georgia Scenes, published in 1835 by regional author Augustus Baldwin Longstreet, which included the dialogue "That's sufficient, as Tom Haynes said when he saw the Elephant." Longstreet's book about rural Georgia (during a gold rush) had little to do with the more western venues for later "elephant sightings".

A Washington, D.C. newspaper article from 1848 mistakenly gives an alternate origin for "seeing the elephant". This article, entitled "Seeing the Elephant", says the phrase came from a Philadelphia theatre "a few years" earlier. A play their theater was putting on was in need of an elephant but the few circulating circus elephants were not available and so they made a makeshift elephant and put a man inside to control the few movements the animal had to make. The audiences loved it and were extremely responsive. Unfortunately, the man they put inside was fond of his spirits, and one night he became so drunk he walked the elephant off the stage and into the music pit. The audience left laughing and joking, "Have you seen the elephant?"

Gerald Conti, in his 1984 article "Seeing the Elephant", notes that the origin may date back much further. He writes:

It is likely, however, that the expression dates from well before this time. In the 3rd Century B.C., Alexander the Great's Macedonian warriors defeated the elephant-mounted army of King Porus in the Indus valley. Surely these men brought memories of the strange beasts back to their hearthsides to thrill and excite their families. Considering the remarkable distance traveled by this army and its exotic exploits, it may be that "seeing the elephant" became synonymous with journeys and experiences in strange and far-off places.

Another colloquial origin story many online sources cite is that of the optimistic farmer:

[There is an] old tale of the farmer who upon hearing that a circus had come to town excitedly set out in his wagon. Along the way he met up with the circus parade, led by an elephant, which so terrified his horses that they bolted and pitched the wagon over on its side, scattering vegetables and eggs across the roadway. "I don't give a hang," exulted the jubilant farmer as he picked himself up. "I have seen the elephant."

== Military ==
In some military quarters, having "seen the elephant" has been used as shorthand for having experienced combat.

== Elephants on the Overland Trails ==
The first references to elephants in trail narratives and letters are positive allusions. Such references appear primarily in the writings of emigrants on the Oregon Trail, California Trail, and Mormon Trail. Hopes at the beginning of the trail tended to be high and the "elephant" excitement directly linked to this level of anticipation. John Clark's quote from 1852 is a perfect example of the eager emigrant: "All hands early up anxious to see the path that leads to the Elephant." Not everyone was as eager to head west. If wives began the trail unwillingly and were tense about the trail to come, the "elephant" often reflected these concerns unconsciously. Amelia Hadley wrote in early June 1851, "Some of our company did not lay by and have gone on they are anxious to see the elephant I suppose." While her entry is not necessarily pessimistic, it definitely lacks the enthusiasm others had at the same point in their journey. In May 1852, Lucy Rutledge Cooke exuded zest: "Oh the pleasures of going to see the Elephant!!" These types of exuberant elephant entries are more common for the early months of trail life. In reading through dozens of trail diaries, not a single author was found who wrote of dreading to "see the elephant" in this beginning stage of the trail.

Even entries from the second or third month on the trail were perhaps anxious but rarely glum. In a letter back to his wife, a doctor wrote: "We are now advanced on our trip about 200 miles and in all this trip I have not seen the 'Elephant.' I am told, however, that he is ahead, and if I live, I am determined to see him." This man actually wanted to see the elephant. As the trip westward progressed pioneers began to write in their journals that they were beginning to see glimpses of the elusive animal. Joseph Wood wrote: "Now methinks I see the elephant with unclouded eyes."

As travelers became tired and hungry and saw family members and travel companions die of disease and accidents, reality began to set in. The elephant was not everything they hoped it would be. On June 3, 1852, Polly Coon wrote:

Found our mess very much dejected with their nights watching and drenching but consoled themselves that they had seen some of the Elephant. Everything being wet we concluded to tarry 2 days & dry & repair & wash.

Although the tone is dismal, Coon is still writing of the elephant not as a consequence but as a consolation or benefit of an unfortunate happenstance; in her case it was bad weather. Merrill Mattes, the Great Platte River Road historian, found that bad weather was often a catalyst for pioneers to put the elephant in their journals. A hailstorm induced Walter Pigman (1850) to write: "The boys concluded the elephant was somewhere in the neighborhood." During a storm in 1849, Niles Searls "had a peep at his proboscis." Neither of these references paint the pachyderm in either a good or bad light, but the fact that its usage comes during vicious storms might allude to something more. Storms on the prairie can be dangerous but also tremendous and breathtaking. They probably wrought havoc on wagons and stock, but the pioneers likely could not help but be impressed by the unmatched forces of nature at play on the open plains. This mixture of fear, misfortune, and overwhelming new experiences is at the center of the elephant emergence.

One bad day was not often treated to elephant status in a pioneer's journal, but successive unfortunate days or occurrences were not only notable themselves but also noteworthy of an elephant reference. George Bonniwell (1850) described incident after incident, including bad roads, no water or grass, and then wrote, "This is a trying time to the men and horses. I have just been to get grass, and got up to my 'tother end' in mud ... First glimpse of the Elephant." In 1853, Helen Stewart described in her journal a botched river crossing and then not even a day later her mother's leg was run over by the wagon. "Pa said we were beginning to see the elephant." Bonniwell and Stewart's first glimpses of the elephant were common situations. Bad roads, no water or grass, and distressing river crossings were common issues dealt with on the trail. Even emigrants getting run over by their wagons were surprisingly common. First glimpses of the elephant were the most common journal entry. However, sometimes the first peek was not as remarkable as later more epic appearances that finally led pioneers like Abigail Scott Duniway (1852) to acknowledge its presence, "We had seen the "Elephant" before we got there but it is the cream of the whole route, we slipped through, the Cascade Mountains between two storms."

As the miles rolled on and the pioneers continued dealing with hardships, their optimistic attitudes plummeted and the elephant was used as a kind of scapegoat for their troubles. The elephant that had demonstrated their excitement was now portraying their concerns. The mythical animal that had imbedded hopefulness in travelers was starting to present a different side. For many, this side was something they did not wish to view again. Lucius Fairchild, a Wisconsinite on his way to California in 1849, wrote: "that desert is truly the great Elephant of the route and God knows I never want to see it again." In just a few months and several hundred miles, the elephant had transformed from a pursued celebrity to an infamous icon. It was at these later stages of the trail that pioneers were finally elephant-weary and showed anger or frustration towards the colossus that had at first given them such high hopes.

The elephant was "seen" at river crossings, during bad weather, after wagons ran over family members, after deaths, and especially at a pioneer's first glimpse of one of many roadblocks in the trail ahead. The emigrants discussed the elephant in terms of their excitement for the outcome of their upcoming journey. They had their eyes on the destination and not always the 2,000 miles that lay between them and their dreamland. The elephant is in many ways a pachyderm of psychological proportions. How the pioneers described him was directly related to how they were feeling. The elephant phrase was early on meant as a good thing, but because it was used in conjunction with an experience that did not turn out as most hoped, the term evolved to have a slightly more negative connotation after the Overland Trail period was over. This downbeat view of the elephant due to its connections with the trails' more grievous moments is likely what has given 20th-century historians the opinion that the elephant was mostly a bad experience. The pessimism of the phrase retained this trait throughout much of its historiography.

All narratives reveal trials, but not all trials are written in conjunction with the elephant. The mythic animal was more than just a term for an ordeal. It was an expression for a tribulation that was ironic or directly followed excitement of some kind. John Lewis' journal entry in 1852 may be the clearest use of the elephant and clearly summarizes everything the elephant symbolizes: excitement followed by troubles, which leads to disenchantment. After Lewis' sightseeing trip to Courthouse Rock he wrote:

We didn't suppose it to be more than one or two miles from the road we went on foot but as we found it to be at least four miles our trip was not so easy as we supposed ... but like all the rest we must see the Elephant & some of the party did see his back before they got to camp as some of them was out till 9 o'clock.

Courthouse Rock was a popular visual attraction on the landscape. These large monoliths were trail markers that were not always accessible for up-close perusal. Independence Rock has etchings all over its expansive base from travelers leaving their names, but Courthouse Rock was not as close to the main vein of the trail. As a result, if pioneers wanted to see it, they had to take side trips. Merril Mattes attributes the lack of depth perception to altitude; this misled many sightseers to think it was much closer than it was. John Lewis was one of these disillusioned tourists that in many ways can be universally compared to the average pioneer on the trail. He wanted to see the butte, but the distance to see it and the extra work this entailed was more than he was expecting. Hence while Courthouse Rock was massive and breathtaking, Lewis' overall experience of going so far out of his way was unexpected and disenchanting.

== Brothel and saloon elephants ==
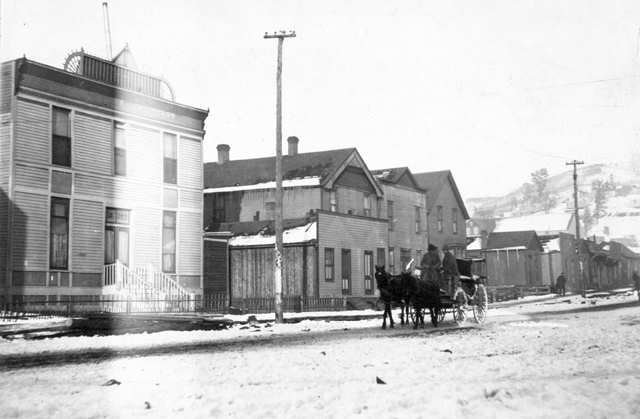
"The Row, Cripple Creek: a part of town where everybody goes to see the elephant."

The ambiguity of the colloquial phrase "seeing the elephant" is likely what led to it being used as a euphemism or slang for western saloons and brothels throughout the end of the nineteenth century. A picture of a red light district in 1890s Colorado has the caption: "The Row, Cripple Creek: a part of town where everybody goes to see the elephant." This use of the elephant in regards to brothels was not a one-time use of the term. Coney Island, New York, also shows signs of the elephant referring to brothels or the prostitution trade. The Coney Island Elephant, built in 1884, was used as a brothel after its prime hotel business wore off. In his book about pleasure resorts, Jon Sterngrass writes that the popularity of the phrase came from Coney Island, which used the elephant as a mascot throughout the Gilded Age. "So famous was this massive monument [the Elephant Hotel] that for a generation, "seeing the elephant" signified a quest for satisfactions in disreputable quarters." Earthly delights are not the only reason the elephant craze existed, considering its many earlier origins. More likely the elephant Americanism gained popularity and then was consequently used as a catchy draw for brothels, saloons, or businesses. There were several old west saloons that had "elephant" in the title, including the famous White Elephant Saloons.

The brothel elephant can also be seen in the movie Moulin Rouge! as courtesan Satine's business and living quarters.

== Media ==
Originally put on in New York in 1848, a popular burlesque about the Gold Rush called Seeing the Elephant made it to San Francisco for a performance in the summer of 1850. This show included a song of the same name that went on to become popular in its own right. James McMurtry's song "See the Elephant" from his 2005 album "Childish Things" uses the phrase as a Virginia teenager's chance to go to Richmond for some adult experience before heading off to military service.

The Civil War Museum in Kenosha, Wisconsin, produced and plays a 360° short film (in the style of a cyclorama) titled "Seeing The Elephant", telling the story of Civil War soldiers, named after the phrase as used by soldiers of the time. The museum director said "These guys were excited and expecting glory, but when they got to battle they found chaos and mayhem, and they weren't too anxious to 'see the elephant' again."

== See also ==
- Blind men and an elephant (concerning the concept of whether a person perceives an elephant, but in a different way)
- Cultural depictions of elephants
- Elephant Hotel
- Elephant test
- Folklore of the United States
- List of fictional elephants
- Preved
- Seeing pink elephants (concerning the concept of whether a person perceives an elephant, but in a different way)
- Wagon Train
- Western saloon
- Baptism of fire (a soldier's first experience of combat)
