= Gerard Crane House =

Historic house in New York, United States

- U.S. National Register of Historic Places
- U.S. Historic district
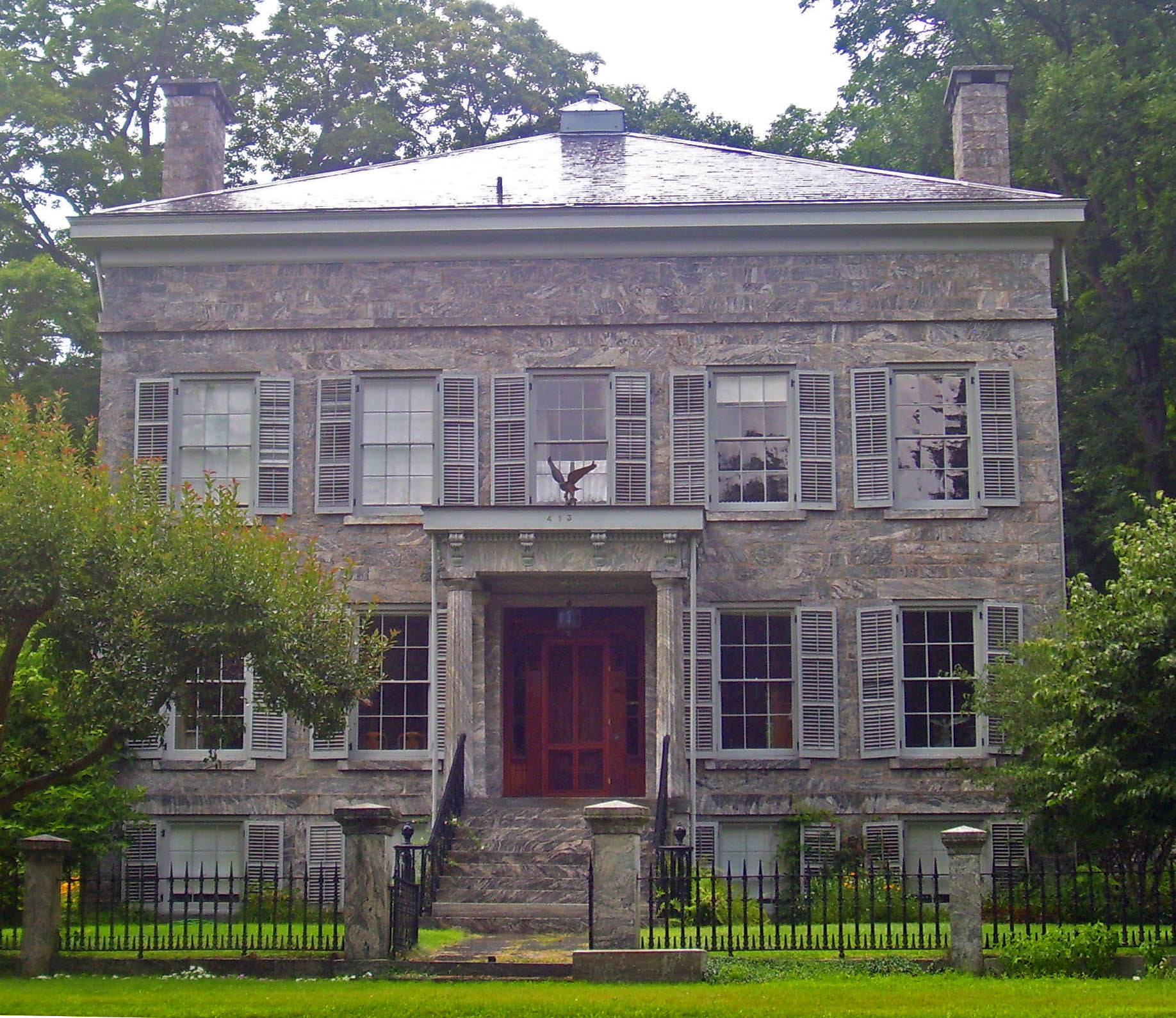
- East elevation, 2008

- Location within New York Location within the United States
- Interactive map showing the location of Gerald Crane House
- Location: Somers, New York
- Nearest city: Peekskill, New York
- Coordinates: 41°20′22″N 73°40′23″W
- Area: 25 acres (10 ha)
- Built: 1849
- Architect: J.R. Dickenson, W.R. Waters
- Architectural style: Greek Revival
- NRHP reference No.: 85001954
- Added to NRHP: September 5, 1985

The Gerard Crane House is a private home located on Somerstown Turnpike (U.S. Route 202) opposite Old Croton Falls Road in Somers, New York, United States. It is a stone house dating to the mid-19th century, built by an early circus entrepreneur in his later years.

The house itself is an unusually sophisticated late application of the Greek Revival architectural style. The interior features a high level of decoration, particularly English Renaissance-style plaster moldings on the ceilings that are not commonly found in rural Greek Revival houses. It is the center of a 25-acre (10 ha) estate that includes not only the original outbuildings but an original section of Somerstown Turnpike and one of its mileposts.

It remains largely as it was originally built. In 1985 the area was designated a historic district and listed on the National Register of Historic Places. It is the northernmost such listing in Westchester County.

== Property ==
The estate is located on the west side of the road, about 1 mile (1.6 km) north of downtown Somers, just opposite Old Croton Falls Road. At the oblique intersection a grassy stretch of the old route of Somerstown Turnpike continues across the front yard and parallel to Route 202 for approximately 800 feet (240 m) north of the house until the road resumes that course. The house itself is located on a small rise, with outbuildings and a garden to the south. There are 10 other contributing properties to the listing on the parcel, five buildings and five structures. A portion of Rhinoceros Brook flows through the property on its way to East Branch Reservoir.

=== House ===
The house is a two-and-a-half-story five-bay stone building on a raised basement with a shallow hipped roof with small cupola and identical chimneys on the north and south. It is sided in a locally quarried granite with an unusual natural marbleized appearance in a smooth-faced ashlar pattern with quoins on the front (reverting to random ashlar on the rear and sides). The roofline has a plain frieze, simple cornice and is set off by a stringcourse.

The east (front) facade has a central entrance portico featuring classical ornamentation. Fluted Doric columns and consoles support an entablature with denticulated cornice. A transom, sidelights, and ornate frontispiece frame the slightly recessed four-inch–thick (10 cm), 500-pound (230 kg) mahogany door. In the rear is a similar portico with a less elaborate door, chamfered Doric columns and a molded entablature.

There is much decoration inside the house. On the north side of the central hall are library and parlor with high ceilings. Their plaster molding features a band with a talon motif over a cornice with an acanthus band and a broad ribbon of flowers and leaves. Below that is a frieze with meticulously detailed plaster heads of noteworthy literary figures encircled and connected by oak leaves and acorns. The doorways and windows are framed by fluted Corinthian pilasters with foliated entablatures atop. A chandelier hangs from an ornate plaster medallion in the library ceiling. Also in the library is an Italian marble fireplace with colonnettes, paneled spandrels and finely carved friezes and cartouches. It has a cast iron fireboard ornamented with a brass crane.

On the south side, the dining room has a similarly foliated band around the ceiling. The original music room has since been converted into a kitchen. There is a less ornate fireplace on the south side. The mahogany staircase has turned balusters, a chamfered newel post and a scroll motif on the risers.

The second floor has a similar layout although it is less ornate. All the bedrooms have cast-iron heat registers and brass hinges on the door with the manufacturer's name. The third story's garret was used as a ballroom. Four queen posts surround the area under the skylight in the middle of an L-shaped set of servants' quarters on the north and east.

In the basement is the original kitchen, with a large fireplace and bread ovens. Below it is a sub-basement with a datestone giving the names of the contractors and a built-in safe.

=== Outbuildings and landscape ===
Five original buildings remain on the property besides the house. Immediately to the rear is the original summer kitchen, now converted to a two-car garage. It is a one-story building cut into the hillside, sided in granite with a flat roof and stepped parapet. Farther to the rear, and also cut into the hill (steeper at this point), is the gambrel roofed barn with stone foundation and vertical wood siding. It has an elliptical fanlight in its east gable, among other varied fenestration, and a silo to the northwest. Also attached is a deep stone foundation that may be the remains of the original icehouse.

A frame springhouse is slightly to the south, and a one-story granite shop to the northwest, also now in use as a garage. Just off the house's southwest corner is the privy, made of dressed granite with a flat roof, overhanging wooden cornice, mahogany door and six-over-six double-hung sash window.

Contributing structures include the iron fence along the original front lot line of the house, a stone wall between the summer kitchen and barn and a stone bridge over the brook. The original alignment of Somerstown Turnpike, which now serves in part as a driveway for the property, is included, as is one of its stone mileposts.

== History ==
Crane and his brother Thaddeus, descendants of a colonel in the Revolutionary War, moved to Somers from their hometown, nearby North Salem, in 1823. They had become active in the new business of exhibiting exotic animals, and records show that they had taken a lion to the Carolinas three years earlier. They bought land from Hachaliah Bailey, whose exhibition of Old Bet at the building now known as the Elephant Hotel is considered the beginning of the circus in America, that they would later build on.

They added to their menagerie, got partners, and exhibited as far as west as the Mississippi River. They were among the founders of an early trade organization called the Zoological Institute, which collapsed in the Panic of 1837. Crane himself was more fortunate; he served as a director, and later president of a local bank, and had just concluded four years as town supervisor at the outset of the panic.

In 1849, having married Roxana Purdy, he had the house built. Its extensive detailing and finely crafted stonework are features of a country manor house in the highest Greek Revival tradition. The English Renaissance-style molded plasterwork on the first floor ceilings, common in urban homes of this type but rare in rural variants, reflects Crane's cosmopolitan tastes.

The next year's census shows the Cranes at that address, with their six children and one other woman. He died in 1872. The house and estate have remained a private residence since then. Other than the barn's gambrel roof and the conversion of the main house's music room into a kitchen in 1964, there have been no significant alterations to the property.

== See also ==
- National Register of Historic Places listings in northern Westchester County, New York
