= John L. Sullivan (elephant) =

Boxing elephant of the Adam Forepaugh Circus

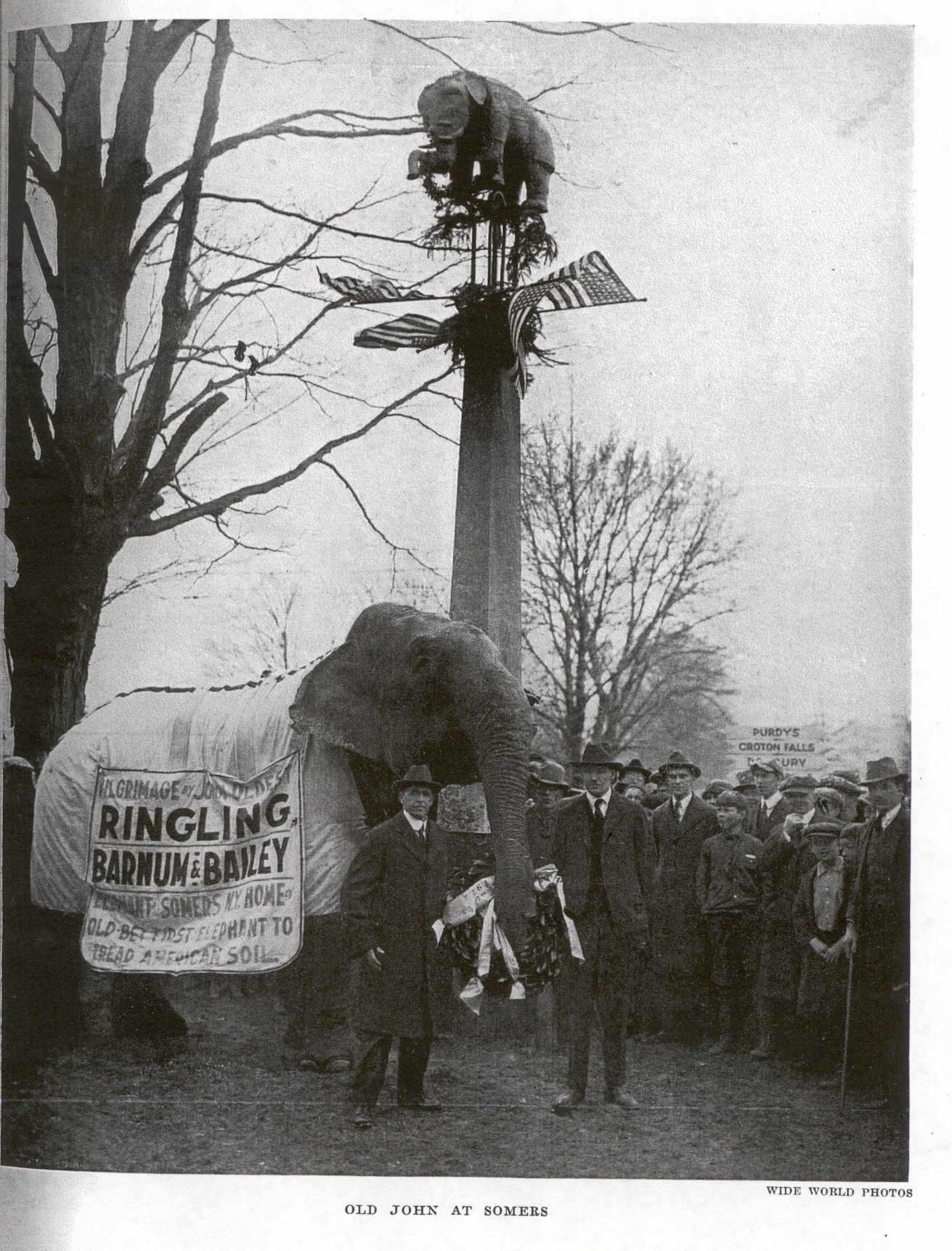
Old John laying a wreath at the monument to Old Bet in Somers, New York

John L. Sullivan (circa 1860 - April 1932), was a tuskless male Asian elephant that performed in the Adam Forepaugh circus and, later, in the Ringling Brothers Barnum and Bailey Circus.

== Biography ==
In the early days of its career, John L. (who was named after the boxer John L. Sullivan) performed a boxing act with his trainer, Ephraim Thompson. John would have a boxing glove placed at the end of his trunk to spar with Thompson. John stayed with the circus as the Forepaugh show joined with the Sells Brothers Circus, which then joined with the Ringling Brothers Circus.

Old John, as he came to be known, stayed on with the circus after he retired from performing. He babysat for the performers' children, did heavy lifting, and led the elephant herd to and from the show grounds and train.

On 9 April 1922, John, with Dexter Fellows, began a 53-mile pilgrimage from Madison Square Garden to the Elephant Hotel in Somers, New York, to pay tribute to Old Bet, the first elephant in America. John arrived on 13 April 1922. He laid a wreath on the monument to Old Bet.

He died of old age or of heart failure in Sarasota, Florida in 1932.

== See also ==
- List of individual elephants
