= Jeffrey Sanzel =

American dramatist

Jeffrey Sanzel is a theater director, stage actor, and playwright. He is best known for playing Scrooge over 1,000 times. He is also the author/director of From the Fires: Voices of the Holocaust, that has been touring since 1996.

== Background ==
Sanzel was born in 1966, in Rochester, New York. He is a graduate of Brighton High School and received his BFA from SUNY College at Purchase.

He taught at John F. Kennedy Catholic High School in Somers, New York, from 1989 to 1991. He came to Theatre Three, Port Jefferson, Long Island, in 1989, as Children's Theatre Coordinator. He was named Artistic Director in 1993, a position he currently holds.

In 2008 he was honored by the Port Times Record in 2008 when they named him "Man of the Years in Arts 2008".

He is also the recipient of several BroadwayWorld.com awards as well as Encore Awards for his work as a director and as an actor.

== Theater ==
Sanzel has directed over three hundred productions, including the world premiere of Treasure Island: A Musical Adventure (Yellen-Friedman-Holt). Other credits include the Long Island premieres of next to normal; M Butterfly; Jewtopia; Playdates; Ruthless-The Musical!; Dream a Little Dream: The Mamas and Papas; The Compleat Works of Wllm Shakespeare (Abridged); The Boy from Oz; Dracula: The Musical; Streakin’: A Musical Flashback to the 1970’s’; and Bingo: The Winning Musical.

Among his many other credits are The Laramie Project; Big River: The Adventures of Huckleberry Finn; The Children’s Hour; Doubt; Master Class; The Diary of Anne Frank; Eleemosynary; etc.

With Ellen Michelmore, he co-authored 1968: Rock the World, an original musical that played out its story against songs of the 1960s.

He founded Theatre Three's Annual Festival of One-Act Plays for which he has directed over one hundred world premieres, selected from thousands of submissions across the world. The Festival plays at the Ronald F. Peierls Theatre, on Theatre Three's intimate Second Stage.

He has written children's theatre works and educational programs. These include plays and musicals based on stories such as The Three Little Pigs, Goldilocks, Is That You?, Beauty and the Beast, and Aladdin and the Lamp, as well as stories such as The Littlest Pirate, The Fairy Princess, and Pumpkin Patch Magic.

He collaborated with Brent Erlanson, providing book and lyrics to Erlanson's music. Other collaborators include Douglas J. Quattrock, Timothy Peierls, Kevin F. Story, and Jules Cohen.

His first major educational program was the anti-DWI play And These, Our Friends, which toured for twenty years and was made into a film by the AAA Foundation. He followed this with From the Fires: Voices of the Holocaust. Following this, with Douglas Quattrock, he co-created two original musicals: Class Dismissed: The Bullying Project and Stand Up! Stand Out! The Bullying Project

=== From the Fires: Voices of the Holocaust ===
The story follows a fictional Berlin teenager, Rachel Gold, from the 1937 to 1945, from the Nuremberg Laws to deportation to Auschwitz to the liberation of Mauthausen. The play is performed by a cast of six, with several actors playing multiple roles. It has been performed over 700 times for well over 150,000. It has been seen all across Long Island, New York City and the Five Burroughs, Connecticut, Pennsylvania, New Jersey, Washington, Virginia, Massachusetts, and in Richmond Hill, outside of Toronto.

The narrator of the piece, an unnamed American Soldier, is based on Mauthausen liberator, John D’Aquila, a friend of Sanzel's who was a board member at Theatre Three during the time Sanzel was creating the piece.

=== A Christmas Carol ===
Sanzel has a long history with Charles Dickens’ classic A Christmas Carol. He first adapted, directed, and appeared as Scrooge in 1988, at Kennedy High School when he was employed as a theatre teacher. In 1989, he came to Theatre Three, where he co-adapted and directed the Mainstage production. From 1990 on, Sanzel as appeared as Scrooge every holiday season. He has continued to re-adapt and direct the production each season.

The New York Times praised the newer versions by writing "Sanzel looks at "A Christmas Carol" as a multifaceted literary jewel in which each plane is another angle from which to view the story. This year he has woven holiday carols throughout the show like multicolored ribbons tying the package together." And of Sanzel's own work acting within the play, they wrote he "does an excellent job as a Scrooge haunted by the shadows of his own life and its many lost opportunities and misdeeds". They offered of the overall production, "This is a forceful production that again brings home the necessity to look around and offer a helping hand to the less fortunate. It helps visualize the Christmas spirit of human kindness that can live throughout the year, and it ends with a blessing from an old English carol, "Love and joy come to you . . . " What is unusual about the Theater Three vision is that it all seems so possible.

=== Where There’$ a Will ===
In 1985, Sanzel wrote and directed an original play, Where There’s a Will, for the Teen Drama Group of the Jewish Community Center of Greater Rochester. The premise of this original comedy is a group of down-and-out show folk are given the change to each inherit half a million dollars if the perform a play exactly as written—typos and all.

A revised version of the play was presented at the Mandel JCC (Beachwood, Ohio), in the fall of 2015.

A newly revised version—Where There’$ a Will—will appear on Theatre Three's Mainstage in April 2017.

== Awards and nominations ==
- 2008, Man of the Years in Arts, awarded by Port Times Record
