= Mount Zion Methodist Church (Somers, New York) =

Historic church in New York, United States

- Mt. Zion Methodist Church
- U.S. National Register of Historic Places
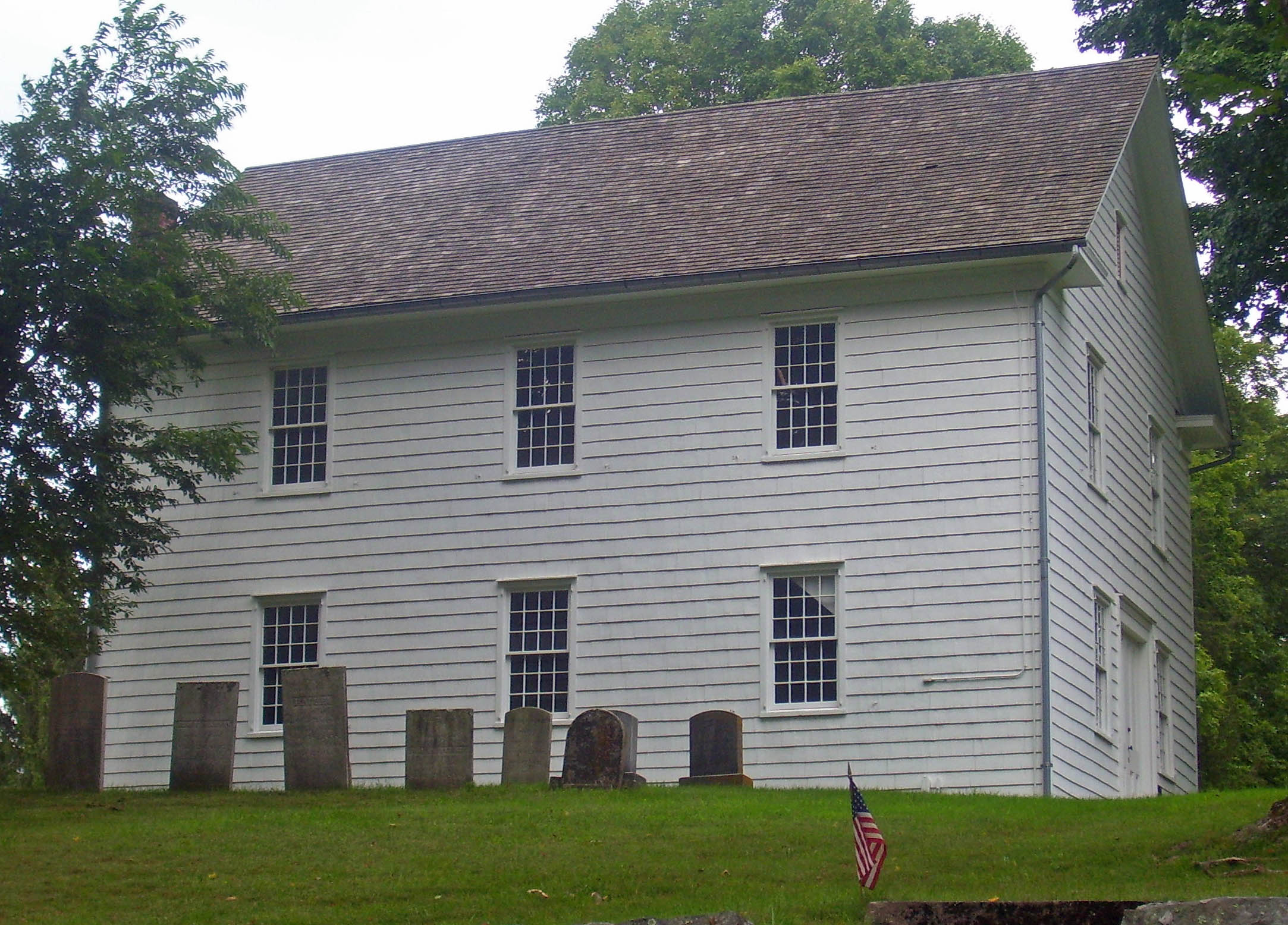
- West profile and south elevation, 2008
- Location: Somers, New York
- Nearest city: Danbury, Connecticut
- Coordinates: 41°18′08″N 73°42′52″W
- Area: 1.4 acres (5,700 m^{2})
- Built: 1794
- Architect: Micajah Wright
- Architectural style: Federal, Greek Revival
- NRHP reference No.: 90000692
- Added to NRHP: May 10, 1990

Mount Zion Methodist Church is located on Primrose Avenue (NY 139) in Somers, New York, United States. It is a white clapboard-sided church built in 1794 and expanded in1860. A century later, in 1970, it was severely vandalized.

It is the oldest church in Somers, and important to the establishment of Methodism in New York as the dominant church in northern Westchester County for much of its history. The congregation has been defunct since the late 19th century, and the building and its cemetery are now town property. In 1990 it was listed on the National Register of Historic Places.

== Property ==
The church building is located on a small 1.4-acre (5,700 m^{2}) lot along the east side of Primrose just south of Reis Park. It is on a small rise, elevating it above the roadway which slopes south at that point, with the cemetery on three sides. All lot lines save the front are marked by stone walls.

=== Church ===
It is a two-and-half-story post-and-beam frame gabled church 30 by 40 feet (9.1 by 12.2 m) on a slightly exposed fieldstone foundation. There is no decoration or steeple, but a small brick chimney rises from the north end. The roof is shingled in asphalt and has an overhanging eave, complemented by plain frieze and cornerboard.

All three bays on both stories on the east and west have 12-over-12 double-hung sash windows. There are only two windows on the north and south sides of either story, and one small one in the gable ends. The main entrance, in the middle of the south (front) facade, is a pair of doors with a shouldered architrave surround.

From the entrance a narrow vestibule leads inside to a central hall where two small stairways on either side go up to the gallery, supported by four plain columns chamfered above the gallery level. Outside of the vestibule, the plain pine flooring is unpainted. The walls are wainscoted with vertical beaded tongue-and-groove boards on the first story, and plain white plaster above.

There are three sets of benches on the first story, all facing the pulpit except for those on either side of it, which face the center. The pulpit itself is a raised wooden platform supporting a lectern flanked by pedestals. A mahogany and horsehair settee is against the wall. A balustered wooden communion railing along the front also curves to slightly cover the sides. Cast iron heating stoves with detached pipes are located near the south end.

The gallery is floored in overlapping wide pine. Its three rows of benches all face the pulpit. A four-lamped kerosene-fueled chandelier hangs from the ceiling.

=== Cemetery ===
The cemetery's graves are all closely spaced and well-maintained. They date from 1793 to 1959, reflecting design trends of their eras. The oldest 11 graves, up to 1816, are of brown sandstone and shaped like arches with flanking finials. There is little funerary art save an urn on one.

Marble headstones account for the largest group, from 1812 to 1908. These can be divided into three groups. The most numerous, from 1812–1929, are plain stones with block lettering. A small group from 1819–1863 are more neoclassical, with urn and willow motifs including not only urns as well as italic lettering. A small group from the Civil War period are the most ornate in the cemetery, adding books and chain-and-tassel designs to the earlier flourishes. One grave of a Union Army soldier includes a cannon.

Granite takes over for the majority of later graves. Most are more massive, taking the form of pyramids and pedestals. There are three family plots within the cemetery, one of which is only set off by its original fence posts.

== History ==
Methodism had arrived in the American colonies before the Revolution, and continued developing through it and afterwards. Prior to the establishment of churches, the denomination's preachers traveled in "circuits", groups of towns where they had gained followings. These were eventually adopted by the church as its formal organizational structure.

In 1787, the New Rochelle Circuit was formally established by Freeborn Garrettson at the direction of Bishop Francis Asbury. It was the third Methodist Society in the state and the first in Westchester. When the Somers church was built in 1794, it was the first church of any kind in that town and the fifth of seven on the New Rochelle Circuit.

All of these were intentionally built as austere as possible. This saved money and was in keeping with the Methodist philosophy as it broke from England. Asbury had declared that all Methodist houses of worship were to be "plain and decent, but no more expensive than absolutely unavoidable." Many were simple white frame buildings like Mt. Zion, resembling houses or barns more than churches, with only their large windows suggesting that use and the influence of the Federal style. Of the original seven, only Mt. Zion and the Bethel Chapel in what is now Croton retain most of their original form and finish.

As Methodism grew in popularity, so did the churches. The circuits continued to be redefined. Mt. Zion became part of the Croton Circuit in 1803, and then the Cortlandt Circuit six years later. In this position it was the central church for the surrounding communities. One of its mission churches, the West Somers Methodist Episcopal Church, has itself had its former building listed on the National Register.

This lasted until the 1840s, when the churches in Shrub Oak and Peekskill to the west received their own circuit. In 1860 the church received a major rehabilitation, adding some decoration in the Greek Revival, reducing the size of the pulpit and adding the gallery.

Mt. Zion's regional influence continued on churches in the rural communities to the north and east until 1861, when the circuit was effectively disestablished. At that time the Lewisboro church became separate, and Mt. Zion's influence was purely local.

Because of this, and the growth in communities encouraged by the New York and Harlem Railroad (today the Metro-North Harlem Line), the congregation began to dwindle. It enjoyed a renaissance in the 1880s under several committed new pastors, with a hundred new members. The construction of the New York City water supply system in northern Westchester ended that resurgence, as the land acquired for its reservoirs displaced many of the local farmers who had made up the bulk of the congregation since its earliest days. The last regular services were held by The Rev. N.S. Tuthill in 1897.

The church building went under the care of the Methodist congregation in nearby Katonah, which maintained it for a while in the early 20th century and held anniversary services there once a year. Those ceased after 1930, and the building began to decay. In 1970 it was severely vandalized, with its original mahogany pump organ destroyed as well as the original balusters around the pulpit. The original windowpanes were smashed at that time as well.

Three years later, in 1973, the town bought it from the Methodists to prevent further incidents and preserve it as a historic site. It is today under the care of the Somers Historical Society. In the late 1980s its site was further buffered when a developer donated the adjacent 16 acres (6.5 ha), former farmland which had been zoned for single-family residential use, to the town as open space in return for clustering houses in another development.

== See also ==
- National Register of Historic Places listings in northern Westchester County, New York
