= IBM Somers Office Complex =

- The complex in 2006

General information
- Type: Corporate Offices
- Architectural style: Modernist
- Location: Somers, NY
- Coordinates: 41.32072°N 73.67855°W
- Construction started: July 1984
- Completed: October 1989
- Cost: $55 million
- Owner: Sebastian Capital

Dimensions
- Other dimensions: 750 acres (3.0 km^{2}; 1.17 sq mi)

Technical details
- Floor area: 1,200,000 square feet (110,000 m^{2})

Design and construction
- Architect: I. M. Pei
- Architecture firm: Pei Cobb Freed & Partners

The IBM Somers Office Complex is a complex of five office buildings formerly owned and occupied by IBM in Somers, New York, United States. Situated on a 730-acre (3.0 km^{2}) campus, the I. M. Pei-designed, glass pyramid-topped structures formerly housed the Global Services, Software, and the Systems and Technology Group.

Begun in 1984, the modernist 1,200,000-square-foot (110,000 m^{2}) complex has been described as a "futuristic fortress".

== History ==
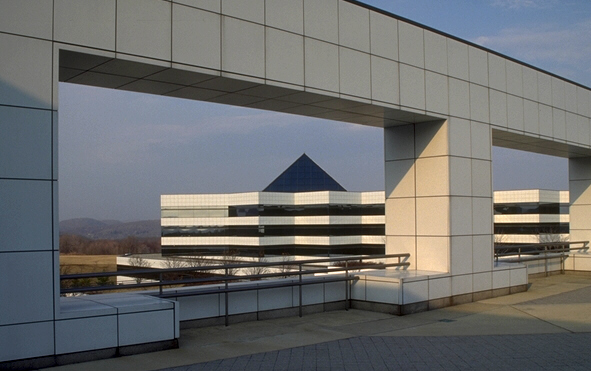
View from plaza

The complex was originally conceived in 1983 following the successful approval of a PepsiCo corporate campus nearby. Constructed between 1984 and 1989, the $200 million complex allowed consolidation of 3,000 employees previously spread among several facilities in the surrounding area. The complex has overcome initial complaints over excessive water usage and light pollution to become a business fixture in the Somers area.

On September 29, 2016, IBM sold the property to a company called 294 Route 100, LLC (the address of the property) for $31.75M. The transaction was recorded on October 18, 2016. At the time of sale, the property was assessed with a full value of $122,150,943 and taxable value of $16,185,000.

On March 30, 2026, a fire caused damage to the central services receiving building.

By July 2026 the property had become a hot spot for urban explorers, with 48 people having been arrested for trespassing, between February 2026 and July 2026, 30 of whom were teenagers and one of whom was facing felony charges.

== Layout ==
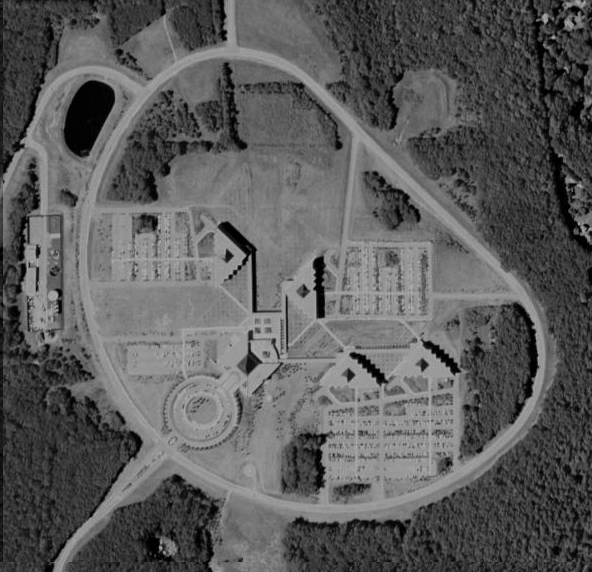
USGS satellite view

Approximately 2,000 IBM employees in Global Services, Software, and the Systems and Technology Group once occupied 1,200,000 square feet (110,000 m^{2}) of office space in the 730-acre (3.0 km^{2}) hilltop campus consisting of four triangle-shaped main buildings and a central service building, each topped with a glass pyramid.

== Awards ==
In 1990 the Somers complex staff was given IEEE Corporate Innovation Recognition "For the development of the multilayer ceramic thermal conduction module for high performance computers."

== See also ==
- Thomas J. Watson Research Center
