= Somers Hamlet Historic District =

Historic district in New York, United States

- U.S. National Register of Historic Places
- U.S. Historic district
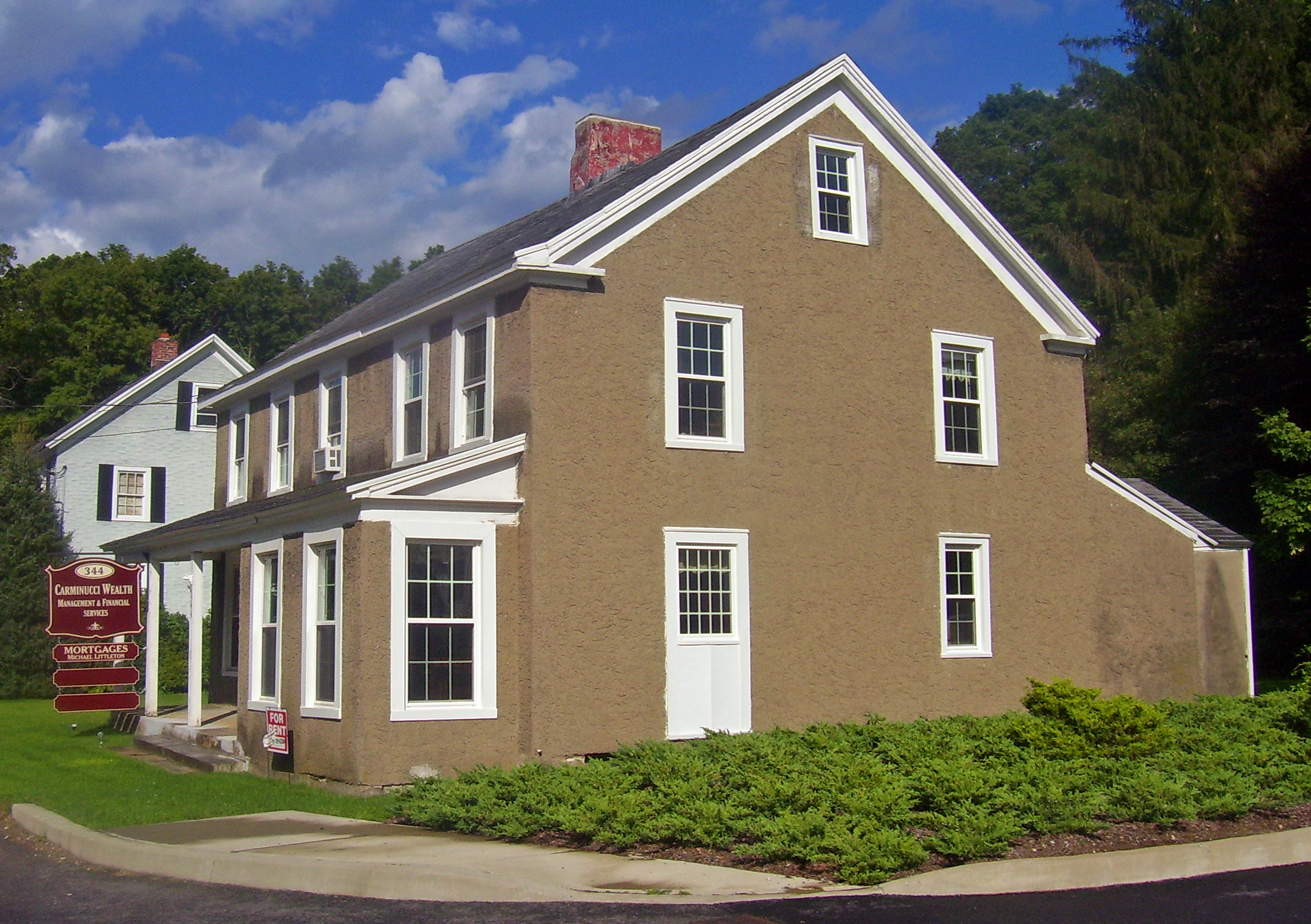
- Houses along Route 202, 2008

- Location within New York Location within the United States
- Location: Somers, NY
- Nearest city: Danbury, CT
- Coordinates: 41°19′49″N 73°40′59″W
- Area: 56 acres (23 ha)
- Built: early, mid-19th century
- Architectural style: Federal, later Revival styles
- NRHP reference No.: 04000349
- Added to NRHP: April 21, 2004

The Somers Hamlet Historic District is a historic district located along US 202 in Somers Hamlet in Westchester County, New York, United States. It is the stretch of highway between the junctions with NY 100 and NY 116, including small portions of both highways. Two side streets, Deans Bridge Road and The Lane, are also included, bringing its total area to 56 acres (22.4 ha).

Forty-six of the 57 buildings, sites and structures within the district are considered contributing properties. Many of them date to the early 19th century, when the hamlet was at the junction of the Croton Turnpike (now NY 100) and the Peekskill-Danbury Turnpike (now US 202). Despite the increasing suburbanization and development in northern Westchester, particularly due to the nearby presence of the corporate headquarters of IBM and PepsiCo, the area has retained its historic integrity as a relic of the area's rural origins and a fine example of the migration of New England vernacular architectural styles into New York.

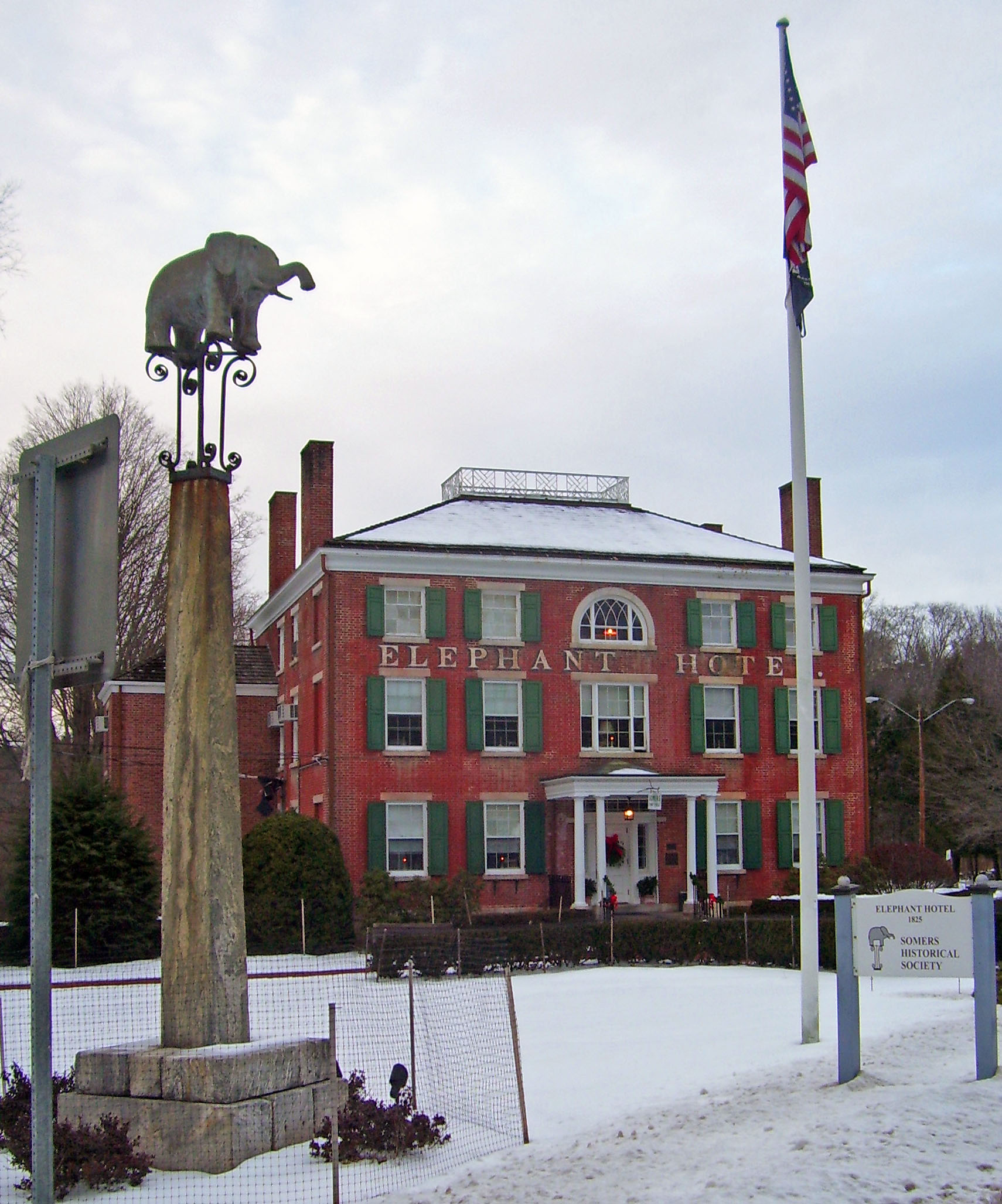
The Elephant Hotel

The most significant contributing property, the Elephant Hotel at the junction of NY 100 and US 202, currently serves three functions. It is Somers' Town Hall, the offices of its historical society and the American Circus Historical Society. The latter agency reflects the building's historical importance as the birthplace of the circus in the United States. The brick Federal style structure, one of the finest examples of a hotel in that style in the state, was built by Hachaliah Bailey in 1825. A decade earlier he had brought an African elephant, Old Bet, to the U.S. Originally he had intended to use the animal in his fields, but he found he could make more money charging visitors to see Old Bet. He later organized a traveling menagerie that began to include other animal acts and human performers as well; this grew into what became part of the Ringling Bros. and Barnum & Bailey Circus.

Other historic buildings in the area are primarily wood-frame structures built as dwellings, with barns and other outbuildings supporting businesses such as blacksmithies which did a thriving business on turnpike through traffic. The presence of two Shingle style houses on NY 116 near the district's eastern end signifies the time when suburbanization began in the late 19th century, as the homeowners were wealthy enough to afford to hire an architect rather than just use vernacular stylings. Two cemeteries are also included.

The Elephant Hotel, first added to the National Register of Historic Places in 1974. The district was created and added to the Register thirty years later. The following year, 2005, the Elephant Hotel was designated a National Historic Landmark.

== See also ==
- National Register of Historic Places listings in northern Westchester County, New York
