= Angle Fly Preserve =

Land Trust in New York

- Location: New York, United States
- Nearest city: Somers, New York
- Coordinates: 41°17′28″N 73°43′09″W
- Area: 654 acres (2.65 km^{2})
- Established: 2006

Angle Fly Preserve is a 654-acre (2.65 km^{2}) land trust in Somers, New York, USA, administered by the Somers Land Trust. The preserve derives its name from the last naturally spawning Brook trout stream in Westchester County. The preserve hosts a large wildlife population and is "...particularly noteworthy for its turtle and bird life, particularly wood turtle,...". The preserve was officially opened on October 3, 2009 with the "1.3 mile Yellow Trail" being opened for public hiking use. By 2017, there were more than 10 miles (16 km) of trails.

== Land acquisition ==
The land was purchased from a real estate developer in May 2006 for $20.5m, with New York City contributing $9.44, the town of Somers and Westchester each contributing $4m, and the State of New York providing the last $3.22m. This housing project was discontinued, and most of the intended residential houses are now in dilapidated conditions.
