= Muscoot Farm =

Farm museum in Katonah, New York, United States

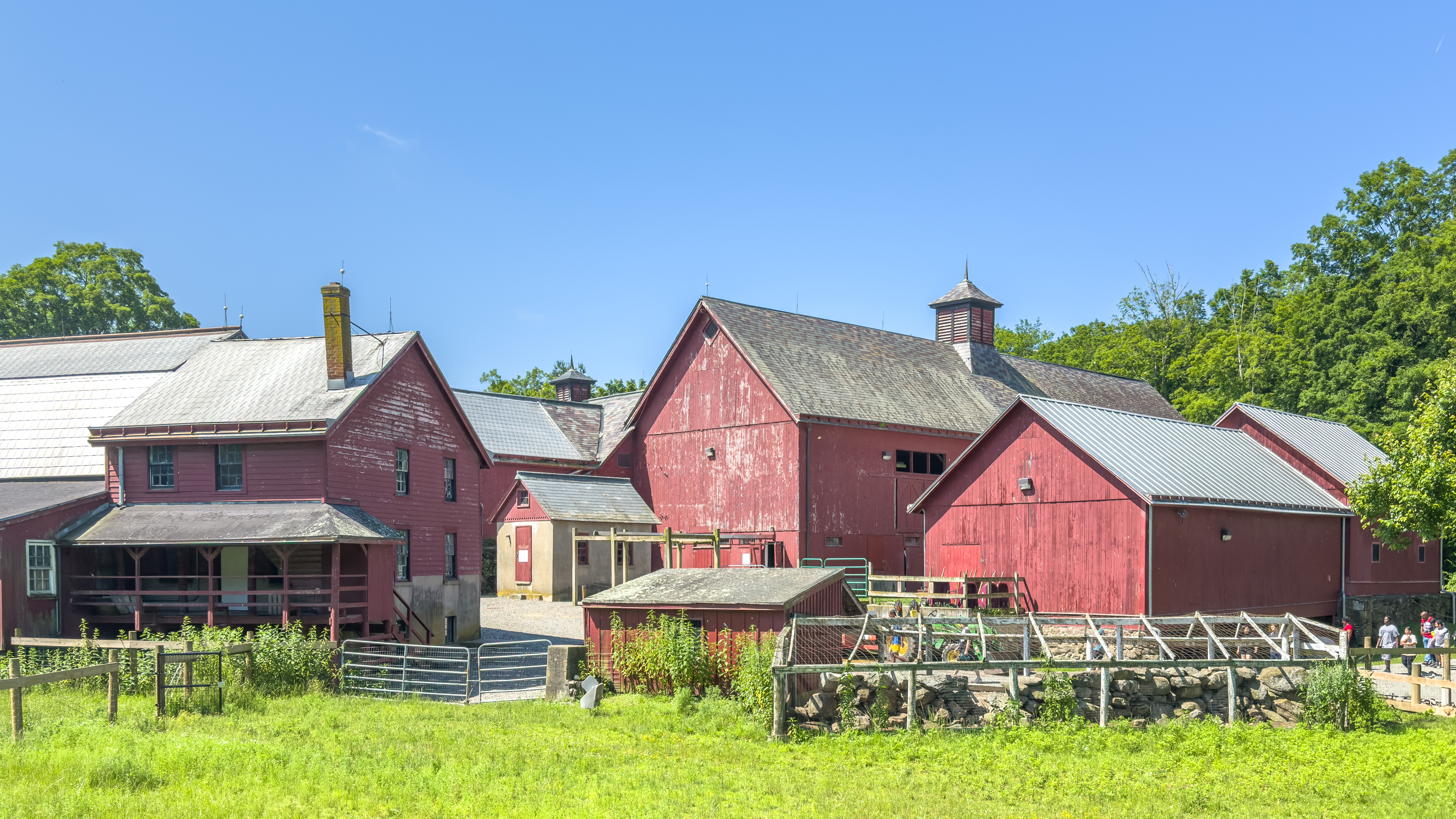
- (2025)
- Town/City: 51 Route 100; Katonah, NY 10536
- Coordinates: 41.265094°N 73.728743°W
- Established: 1974
- Website: http://www.muscootfarm.org/

Muscoot Farm is an early 20th-century interpretative farm museum in Katonah, New York in the United States. The farm is owned and operated by the Westchester County Department of Parks, Recreation and Conservation.

== History ==
The land on which Muscoot Farm is situated was part of the 86,000 acres (350 km^{2}) Van Cortlandt Manor chartered in 1697. After the death of Stephanus Van Cortlandt in 1700 and his wife Gertrude in 1734, the manor was surveyed and divided into twenty large lots and twenty small lots. The Muscoot lands are located in “Great South Lot #6” which was inherited by Stephen Van Cortlandt. At that time, this region was very remote, inaccessible by roads, and probably uninhabited.

In 1802, the Great South Lot No. 6 was resurveyed by Ebenezer Purdy, Jr. and was subdivided into smaller lots proposed as tenant farms. Most of today's Muscoot Farm lies within the Purdy's lot number 3 and 5. The boundary separating lot 5 to the north and lot 3 on the south is still evident as the long straight stone wall that runs east and west across the park just north of the gazebo.

The part of Muscoot Farm that lies north of the stone wall (lot 5) was sold by Stephen Van Cortlandt in 1803 to Absalom Nelson, and it remained in the Nelson family for over 100 years.

The part of Muscoot Farm south of the stone wall (lot 3) was being leased by Joseph Montross at the time of the 1802 survey. A road ran through the property roughly coinciding with today's Rt. 100, and Montross had a house on the west side of the road apparently near the site of the present Muscoot farmhouse. By the mid-19th century, after several land transactions, the Montross farm ended up in the hands of Ezra VanTassel at 157 acres (0.64 km^{2}) in size. Peter Carpenter owned a 100-acre (0.40 km^{2}) farm to the north; William Vail owned a 140-acre (0.57 km^{2}) farm across the road to the east; and Lewis Ferris owned a small farm, about 30 acres (120,000 m^{2}), to the south.

During the 1870s, at a time when farmland in Westchester was being sold off fairly cheaply, the three main farms (VanTassel, Carpenter and Vail) were purchased by Benjamin Brandeth, a pharmaceutical magnate from Ossining who had been dabbling in real estate ventures. During the 1880s this land was bought up by Ferdinand T. Hopkins another pharmaceutical executive from New York City.

Hopkins took these subsistence farms and developed them into a “Gentleman’s Farm”, a term applied to hobby farms owned by wealthy businessman who wished to maintain a connection with nature or with the farm life of their youth. Since profit was not the motive, Muscoot Farm, like most gentleman farms of that era, operated at a loss. It remained in the Hopkins family for almost 90 years and was finally sold to Westchester County in 1968.

The site was officially renamed to the Alfred B. DelBello Muscoot Farm Park in 2016 for former Yonkers mayor, Westchester County Executive, and Lieutenant Governor Alfred DelBello.

=== The Hopkins Family ===
Ferdinand Travis Hopkins was 46 years old when he decided to acquire a summer home in Westchester County. Born on his father's farm in Lake Mahopac in 1834, he spent his first twenty years working alongside his father Nathanial Hopkins on the family farm. He then went to New York City where he made a considerable fortune both in real estate transactions and the pharmaceutical business. Through his second marriage to Martha Bishop Gourand he acquired a profitable business which produced a variety of medicated soaps, skin creams, and other cosmetic preparations.

In 1879, Martha gave birth to Ferdinand T. Hopkins Jr. Hopkins already had a son and daughter by his first wife, and a stepson, Claude L. Gourand, by his second. The appearance of a new baby may have played a significant role in Mr. Hopkins decision to purchase a summer home in Westchester County in 1880.

As purchased, the Ezra Van Tassel farm obviously was not an appropriate summer retreat for an important New York City businessman and his family. It was a working farm with few amenities. The Hopkins decided to build their new house on a knoll slightly north and east of the original farmhouse. They built a late Victorian clapboard farmhouse, with both Gothic Revival and Italianate features. The simple gable roof included a small cross-gable at the front. The house featured Venetian style shuttered windows on the second floor which were covered with brightly striped awnings. It was surrounded by porches and the porches were bedecked with hanging and potted plants, helping to merge the indoors with the outdoors. Painted with contrasting trim on windows, and doors, it was a striking example of the Victorian farmhouse as impressive country home.

It soon became evident that Mr. Hopkins did not intend to limit himself to the Van Tassel farm. He had much more ambitious plans for his summer home. In 1881 he bought a small, 6-acre (24,000 m^{2}) lot on the east side of the Somertown turnpike from Lewis Ferris. In 1889, Ferris sold him an additional 25 acres (100,000 m^{2}) between the turnpike and Croton Lake. With the Ferris purchases he owned the land fronting the turnpike opposite his original Van Tassel farm. He was also interested in the land north and east of his farm. By 1885 Ferdinand Hopkins had leased an additional 220 acres (0.89 km^{2}) of land from Mrs. Virginia Brandreth. It included three additional farmhouses, the David Chadeayne House, the A. Putney house and the Peter R. Carpenter House. In 1892 he purchased this land from Katherine B. Green.

As Ferdinand Sr. spent increasing amounts of time in Somers, his sons concentrated on the family drug business. The Felis T. Gouraud Company had now become Ferd. T. Hopkins & Sons. They continued to produce a line of “Gourand’s Toilet preparations” but expanded the business in the 1920s by purchasing the Landon firm “Mother Sill’s Seasick Remedy.” The popularity of the transoceanic liners in search of a touch of European sophistication made the “Mothersill’s” acquisition a lucrative expansion.

Ferdinand Sr. died in 1920, leaving Muscoot to Ferdinand Jr. Ferdinand Jr. and his second wife, Myrtle Rose Kennedy, moved into the family home. With their two children, Jean born 1920 and Ferdinand III, born 1925, they spent their summers on the farm, even living in the house during the 1925 - 1927 remodeling when the main house was converted into a 20th-century Colonial Revival mansion. Myrtle's parents William and Mary, moved into their former home across the road from the mansion. William Kennedy may have acted as farm superintendent for a short time during the mid-1920s.

It was probably during the 1920s and early 1930s that farming activity peaked at Muscoot, with all of the activity focused on New York City dairy market. During this time, Muscoot Farm included approximately 610 acres (2.5 km^{2}) of land. On this land the Hopkins kept a herd of 90 to 100 head of dairy cattle, primary Holstein-Friesians. The large dairy barn accommodated 60 head but there were seldom that many cows milking at any one time.

The work of agriculture was undergoing a whirl of changes and the farm that Ferdinand Jr. encountered in the 1920s differed dramatically from the 1880s when Ferdinand Sr. first bought the Muscoot lands. Some changes were straight forward, like the advances in technology and farm equipment, the increase in government regulation, and the new discoveries in medical science and genetics. Other changes were more subtle, like the shifting perception of farming and agriculture in America. As the nation entered the 20th century, farmers were consigned to supporting roles in the new industrial society. Farmers had to adapt to these changes and many Westchester farmers found themselves less and less able to compete in the world agricultural market. Rapid transportation brought competing goods to New York market area at considerably lower costs than those of the local farmer. Competing industries in the area readily absorbed all available labor, leaving the local farmer with high labor costs. Farming was being transformed from a way of life into a business.

=== Muscoot on the Move ===
A shadow lurked on the horizon as Ferdinand Hopkins began enlarging his farm and modernizing his dairy operation. In 1883, the state legislature passed “An Act to provide new Reservoirs, Dams and a new Aqueduct with appurtenances thereof, for the purpose of supplying the City of New York with increased supply of pure and wholesome water”. This act allowed the city's engineers to begin assessing possible sites in Westchester for future dams.

It was clear from the beginning that northern Westchester County would be greatly affected by the new reservoirs. Ultimately the entire village of Katonah had to be moved, while significant portions of Goldens Bridge, Purdys, and Croton Falls would vanish. The farms which fronted the Croton and Muscoot Rivers also faced probable losses to rising flood water.

On January 5, 1897 the city of New York notified Ferdinand T. Hopkins that it was taking 160 acres (0.65 km^{2}) of land on Muscoot farm. This included land actually flooded once the Cornell Dam (New Croton Dam) was completed in 1906, plus adjacent acreage needed to protect the watershed of the reservoirs. This also included the parcels on which the house and all the farm buildings were located. Like most of the Westchester farmers he immediately set out to lease back the lands and buildings. Once he had regained the use of his summer home, he could concentrate on planning his next move.

New York City did not want to pay demolition expenses before its lands were flooded and preferred to offer the buildings to the public with the proviso that the buyer remove them at his own expense. In April 1899, the city put the buildings up for public action. Hopkins made an offer to the Aqueduct Commission which the city accepted.

The buildings acquired at auction had to be moved from the city property. Moving the various buildings required patience and ingenuity in an era when horses provided the motive power. Each building was moved without being dismantled. It would be gently moved off it foundation onto a bed of logs which served as rollers. A team of horses worked a large windlass which was set up in front of the building in the direction it was to be moved. Ropes from the building were attached to the windlass and as the horses turned it, the building was pulled forward off its foundation and across the log rollers. Once the edge of the bed of logs was reached, the logs from behind the house were moved to the front, the windlass advanced further.

There were many large buildings on the Hopkins property that had to be moved, plus a plethora of smaller structures. The main house, carriage house, carriage barns, and the horse barn at the southern end of the dairy barn each required weeks of preparatory work. Each building had to be carefully examined and reinforced to withstand the move. New foundations had to be prepared at the new site. The path between the old and new sites had to be leveled and smoothed, to make the move as easy as possible. In addition to these large buildings, the hen house, ice house, outhouse, old milk house, and corn crib made the journey northward toward the large dairy barn.

== Farm museum ==
Westchester County opened Muscoot Farm as an open-air interpretive museum and park in 1975. It features year round displays of various farm animals, hiking trails, farm implements and buildings, as well as maple syrup and sugar harvesting in late winter.

== See also ==
- Muscoot Reservoir
- Open-air museum
