= Hachaliah Bailey =

Founder of one of America's earliest circuses (1775–1845)

- Born: July 31, 1775; North Salem, New York
- Died: September 2, 1845 (aged 70); Somers, New York, United States
- Occupation: Circus proprietor
- Spouse(s): Mary Purdy (m. 1798) Ruth Ferris

Hachaliah Lyman Bailey (pronounced heck-a-LIE-uh; July 31, 1775 – September 2, 1845) was the founder of one of America's earliest circuses. In 1808, he purchased an Indian elephant which he named "Old Bet" and which was one of the first such animals to reach America. With "Old Bet" as its main attraction, he formed the Bailey Circus, which also included a trained dog, several pigs, a horse and four wagons. This was the impetus for what in time evolved into the Bailey component of what became the Ringling Bros. and Barnum & Bailey Circus.

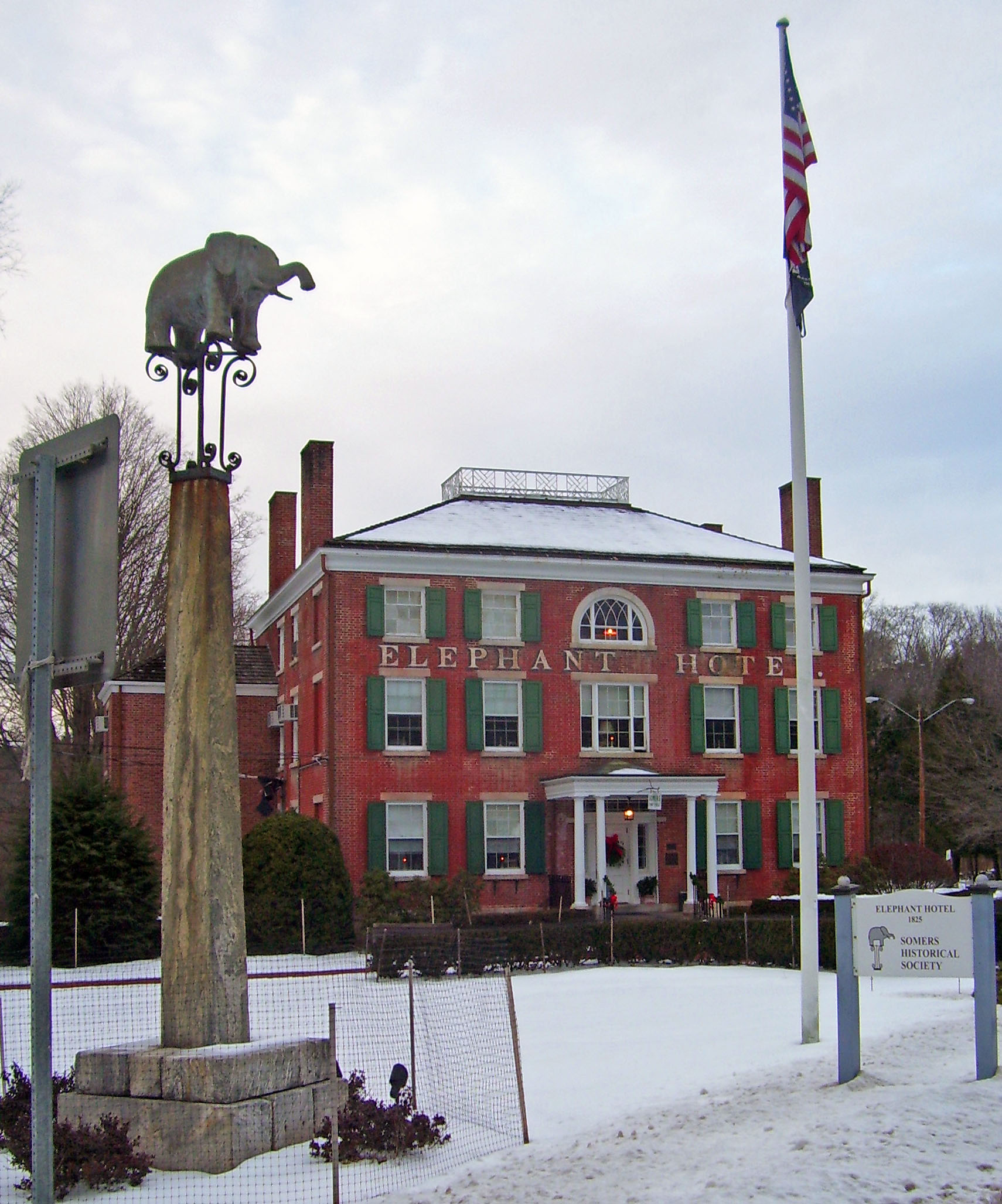
The Elephant Hotel in Somers, New York (2007)

Between 1820 and 1825, Bailey built the Elephant Hotel in Somers, New York. The hotel was designated a National Historic Landmark in 2005. Bailey also served two terms in the New York State legislature.

In 1837, Bailey sold the hotel and moved to Northern Virginia, bought the land surrounding the intersection of Leesburg Pike and Columbia Pike in Fairfax County, Virginia near Falls Church, Virginia, and gave Bailey's Crossroads his name. The Crossroads then became the winter quarters for his circus.

In 1845 Hachaliah returned to Somers for a visit and died from the kick of a horse while there. He is buried in Somers' Ivandell Cemetery.

Several of the next generation of Baileys performed in circuses. Hachaliah Bailey served as a role model to a young P.T. Barnum, who wrote of meeting him when Hachaliah visited Barnum's store in Bethel, Connecticut. In 1888, Barnum lent his name to a partnership with James Anthony Bailey, who had adopted the surname of Frederick Bailey, a nephew of Hachaliah's, to form the Barnum and Bailey Circus.

== Early career ==
Hachaliah Bailey was born in the small village of Somers, New York on July 31, 1775. His parents were James Bailey and Anne Brown Bailey. Hachaliah was one of six children, Mary Bailey, Stephen Bailey, Lewis Bailey, Jane Bailey and Anna Bailey Owens.

Like his father, Hachaliah became a farmer where he farmed land and raised cattle. Hachaliah married Mary Purdy and they had five children. Hachaliah Bailey was also known for finding other ways to make an income. He became one of the directors of the Croton Turnpike Company, this eventually turned into a toll road through the middle of Somers where it became a major route. This route was used to transport cattle to the Hudson. Another way Hachaliah made a profit was by becoming a part-owner of a sloop which was used to transport farm animals.

Hachaliah and many locals frequented a bar called the Bull Head Tavern. This is where Hachaliah bought his elephant Old Bet for only $1,000. Old Bet's name drew from Hachaliah's daughter Elizabeth whose nickname was Young Beth. Old Bet was the second elephant ever to be brought to the United States. Hachaliah brought the elephant to Hudson Valley in 1805 and then New York City in 1806. Old Bet was originally supposed to be used as a draft animal, however, it didn't take long for Hachaliah to realize the rising interest that Americans had for exotic animals. Hachaliah then used this intrigue and began traveling at night so no one could get a glimpse of the animal and he would charge 25 cents per person to see Old Bet.

Hachaliah then decided to showcase Old Bet in a small circus. After Hachaliah's neighbors saw the booming success the exotic creature brought to Hachaliah, most of his neighbors started buying and showcasing exotic animals. Soon after Somers became known for its intriguing animals. By 1808 Hachaliah took on two partners Benjamin Lent and Andrew Brunn each paying $1200 for one/third of the interest on Old Bet. Hachaliah also owned two more elephants after Old Bet was shot on tour by a local farmer who was angry with the amount of money and attention that was being spent on an elephant. Hachaliah then memorialized Old Bet by creating the Elephant Hotel and building a statue in her honor.

== Marriages and children ==
Hachaliah Bailey married his wife Mary Purdy when she was fourteen years old and he was twenty-three years old. Together they had five children:

- Calista Bailey (1800–1879)
- Lewis Bailey (1803–1870)
- Jane Bailey (1808–1882)
- Joseph Turk Bailey (1810–1881)
- Stephen Bailey (1814–1863)

Hachaliah Bailey then would split with Mary and later marry his wife Ruth Ferris Bailey where they had no children.
