= Elephant Hotel =

Town hall of Somers, New York

- U.S. National Register of Historic Places
- U.S. National Historic Landmark
- U.S. Historic district – Contributing property
- New York State Register of Historic Places
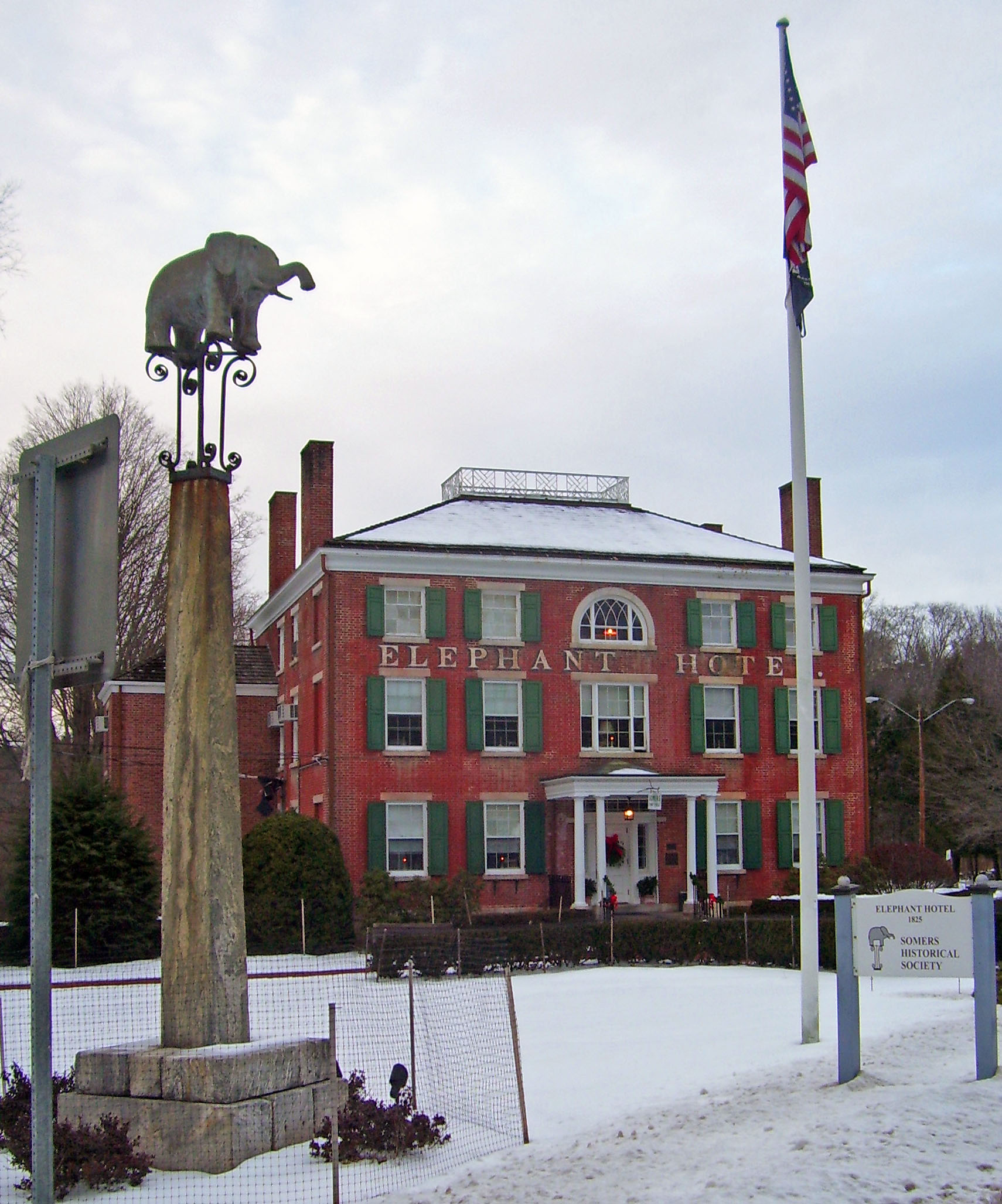
- Elephant Hotel in 2007

- Location within New York
- Interactive map showing the location for Elephant Hotel
- Location: 335 Route 202, Somers, NY
- Nearest city: Peekskill
- Coordinates: 41°19′41″N 73°41′8″W
- Area: 1.67 acres (0.68 ha)
- Built: 1820-1825
- Architect: Hachaliah Bailey
- Part of: Somers Hamlet Historic District (ID04000349)
- NRHP reference No.: 74001323 and 05000462
- NYSRHP No.: 11917.000002

Significant dates
- Added to NRHP: August 7, 1974
- Designated NHL: April 5, 2005
- Designated NYSRHP: June 23, 1980

The Elephant Hotel is a historic former hotel which today serves as the town hall in Somers, in Westchester County, New York, United States. It was listed on the National Register of Historic Places (NRHP) on August 7, 1974 as Somers Town House and designated a National Historic Landmark in 2005 as Elephant Hotel. It is also a contributing property in the NRHP-listed Somers Hamlet Historic District. It is located at 335 US 202, across from the northern end of NY 100.

== History ==
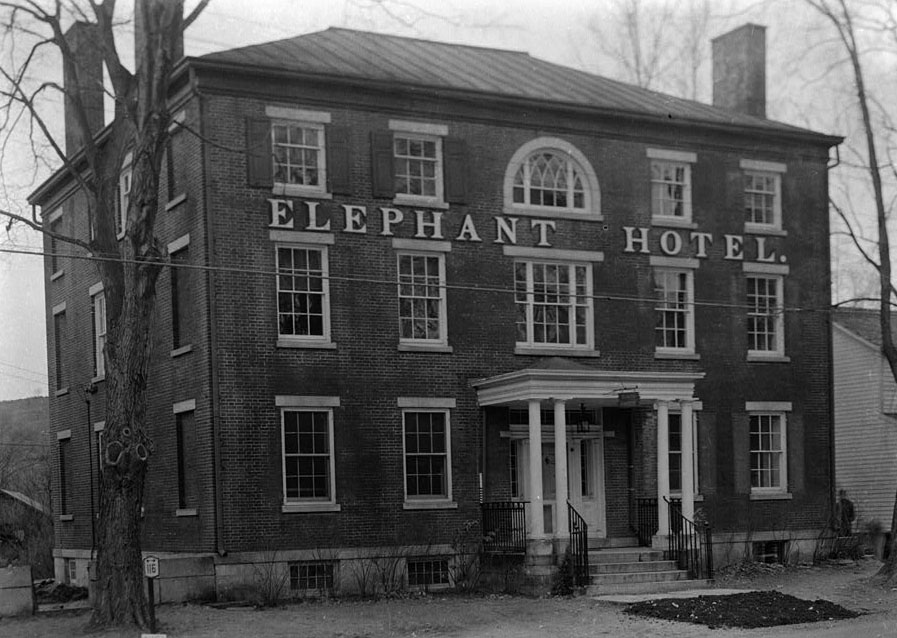
The Elephant Hotel photographed for the Historic American Buildings Survey in the 1930s.

Hachaliah Bailey (known as the creator of Bailey Circus) built the Elephant Hotel in Somers, NY, after buying an African elephant, which he named "Old Bet". Bailey intended to use the elephant for farm work, but the number of people it attracted caused Bailey to tour her throughout the northeast. Old Bet was killed on tour in 1816, when she was shot by a local farmer. Bailey's tours were the first of their type in the nation, and inspired numerous others to tour with exotic animals, and during the 1830s the old style circus and Bailey's attractions merged to form the modern circus. Due to this, Somers is known as the "Cradle of the American Circus".

Bailey had purchased this land in 1805, and began construction of the hotel in 1821, as a memorial to the animals he displayed. It is said Old Bet was buried in front of the building. The monument to Old Bet that stands in front of the hotel was placed in 1827. In 1835, the hotel was incorporated by the Zoological Institute.

The Elephant Hotel was purchased by the town of Somers in 1927. It is a town landmark and was dedicated a National Historic Landmark in 2005.

== Museum of the Early American Circus ==
The Somers Historical Society occupies the third floor of the building. The Society operates the Museum of the Early American Circus, which is open on Thursday afternoons and for special holidays.

== Popular culture ==
- Monumental Mysteries featured an episode about Old Bet in 2013
- Japanese singer-songwriter Akiko Yano released an album titled Elephant Hotel in 1994; the cover features a photograph of Yano standing in front of the hotel.

== See also ==
- List of National Historic Landmarks in New York
- National Register of Historic Places listings in northern Westchester County, New York
