= Old Bet =

First circus elephant

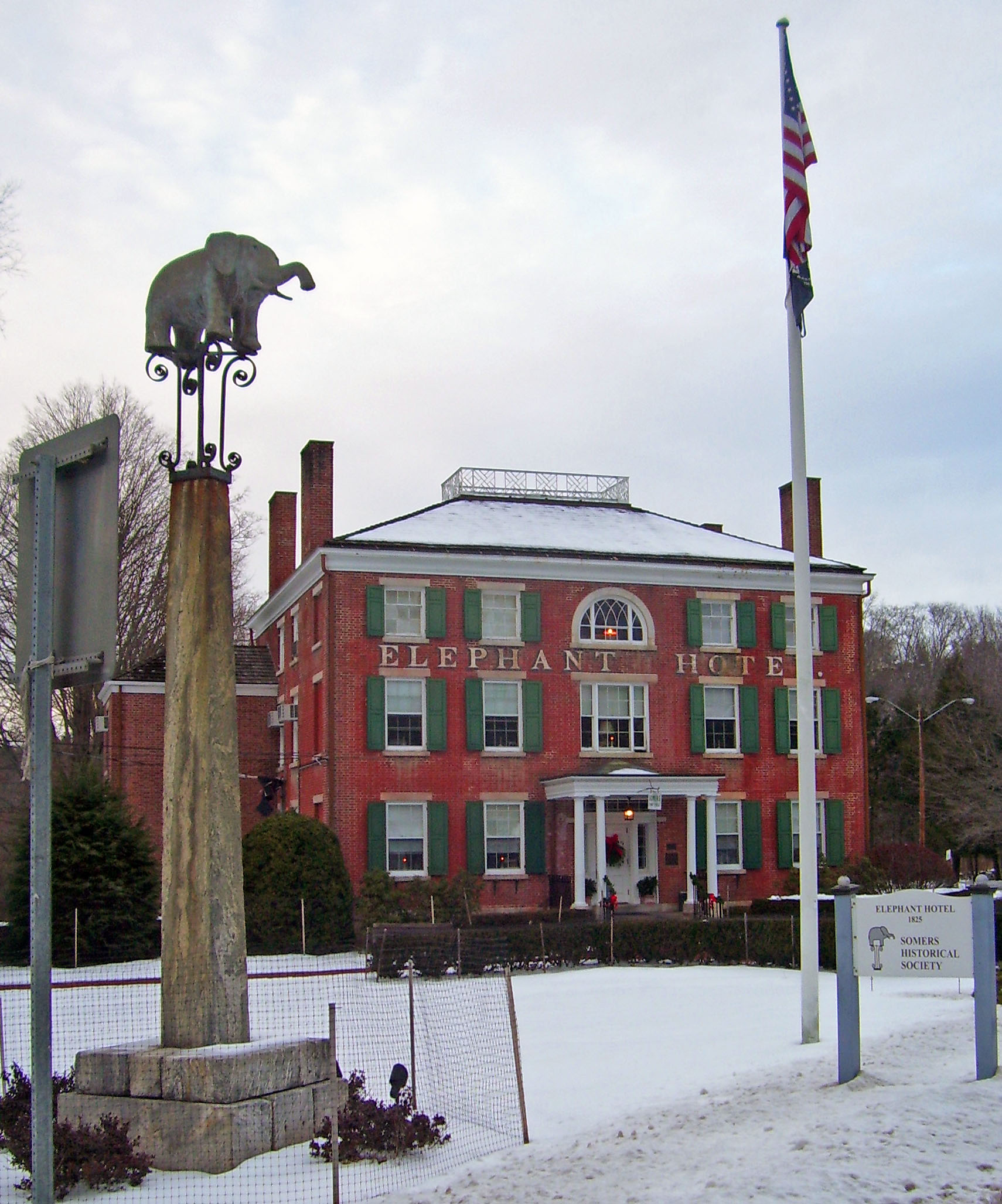
Memorial of Old Bet in front of the Elephant Hotel, in Somers, New York.

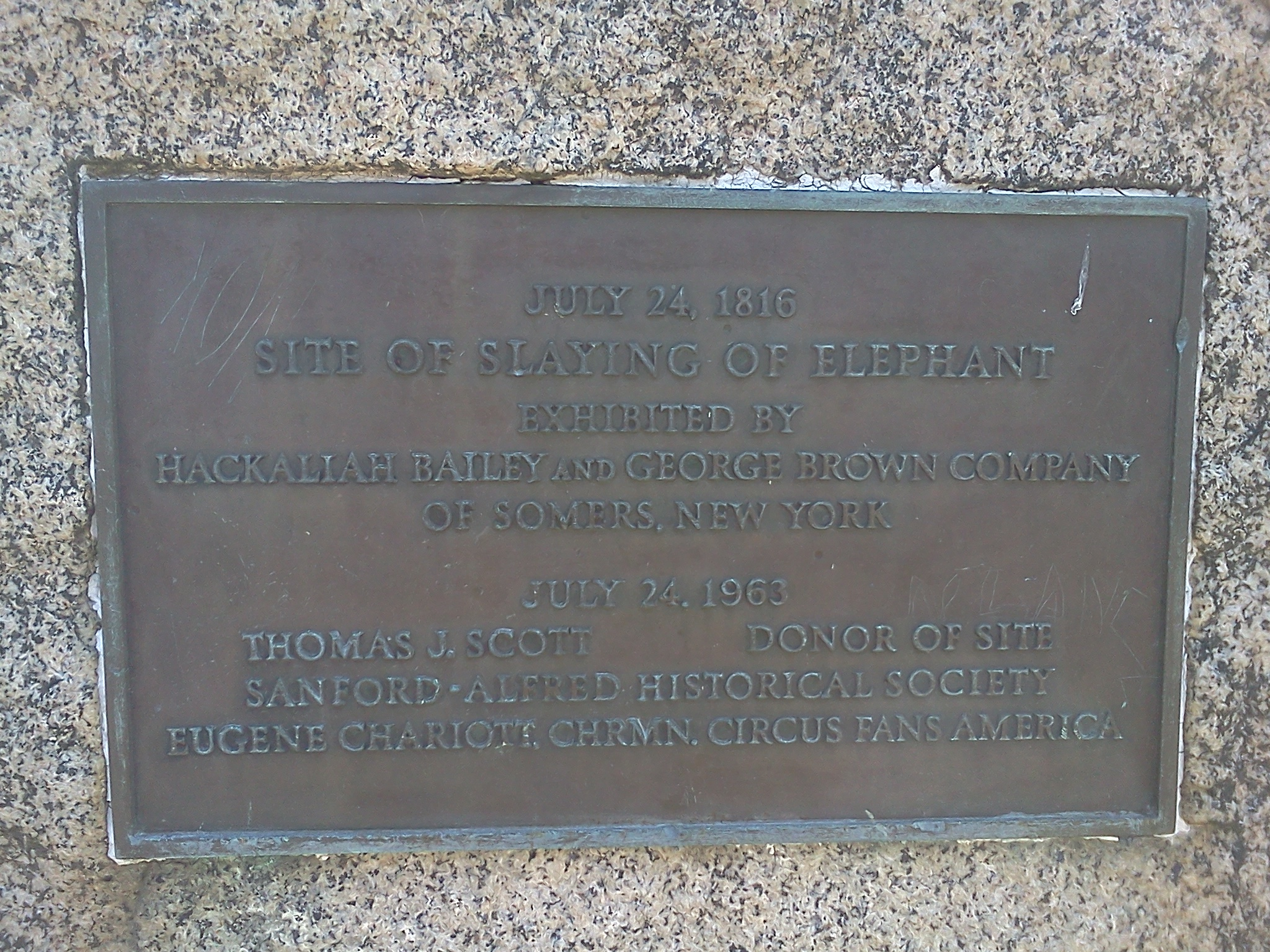
Marker of site in Alfred, Maine, where Old Bet was shot dead

Old Bet (died July 24, 1816) was the first circus elephant and the second elephant brought to the United States. There are reports of an elephant brought to the United States in 1796, but it is not known for certain that this was the elephant that was later named Old Bet.

== Biography ==
The first elephant brought to the United States was in 1796, an Indian elephant aboard the America which set sail from Calcutta for New York on December 3, 1795. However, it is not certain that this was Old Bet. Historical mentions of Old Bet begin in 1804, in Boston, as part of a menagerie. In 1808, while residing in Somers, New York, circus owner Hachaliah Bailey purchased the elephant for $1,000 and named her "Old Bet".

On July 24, 1816, Old Bet was shot and killed while on tour near Alfred, Maine, by local farmer Daniel Davis, who was later convicted of the crime. His motives were believed to be either jealousy or being against the animal cruelty of the circus, with the latter being for religious reasons.

== Legacy ==
In 1821, the Scudder's American Museum in New York announced that they had bought the hide and bones of Old Bet, and would mount the remains at the museum. The elephant was memorialized in 1825 with a statue and the Elephant Hotel in Somers, New York, which is now a historic site. In 1922, the elephant John L. Sullivan walked 53 miles to lay a wreath for the memory of Old Bet at her memorial statue.

In the 1960s, a monument was approved and laid outside of the York County Emergency Management Agency on Route 4, where she was killed.

== See also ==
- List of individual elephants
