= Connecticut Route 123 =

State highway in Fairfield County, Connecticut, US

Route 123
- Map of Fairfield County in southwestern Connecticut with Route 123 highlighted in red

Route information
- Maintained by CTDOT
- Length: 8.37 mi (13.47 km)
- Existed: 1932 (realigned 1934)–present

Major junctions
- South end: US 1 in Norwalk
- US 7 in Norwalk; Route 15 / Merritt Parkway in Norwalk
- North end: NY 123 at the New York state line in Vista, NY

Location
- Country: United States
- State: Connecticut
- Counties: Fairfield

Highway system
- Connecticut State Highway System; Interstate; US; State; SSR; SR; Scenic
← Route 122	→ Route 124

Route 123 is a secondary state highway in southwestern Connecticut from Norwalk to the New York state line near the town of Lewisboro.

== Route description ==
Route 123 begins at an intersection with US 1 in Norwalk and heads northwest, intersecting with US 7 and continuing across the Norwalk River. It then runs through the Silvermine neighborhood near an interchange with Route 15 (Merritt Parkway) at the Norwalk-New Canaan town line. It continues north through New Canaan, ending at the New York state line and continuing as NY 123. Into the Vista neighborhood of Lewisboro, New York.

== History ==
The road from Central Norwalk via New Canaan center to the New York state line was designated as State Highway 184 in 1922. Route 123 was commissioned in 1932 from the southern half of old Highway 184 (Norwalk to New Canaan) and a previously unnumbered road from there to the state line. It originally began at US 1 and ran along Riverside Avenue on the west bank of the Norwalk River to New Canaan Avenue, then from there to the state line along modern Route 123. The northern half of old Highway 184 became part of Route 29 (now Route 124). However, the portion between Norwalk and New Canaan was originally shown as Route 29 in the 1932 official highway map, with Route 123 shown along modern Route 124 between Darien and New Canaan. In 1934, the Routes 123 and 29 south of New Canaan were exchanged for each other.

The New Canaan Avenue bridge over the Norwalk River was a state road known as SR 404. In 1962, this was extended to connect to Main Street and renumbered to SR 739. In 1967, this segment was again renumbered to SR 802. In 1970, US 7 was moved to its modern expressway alignment. The southern end of Route 123 was relocated to use SR 802 and Main Street (former surface alignment of US 7) to end at US 1 east of the river. The Riverside Avenue section became SR 809.

The Route 123 bridge over the Norwalk River, which was undergoing repairs as of August 2007, was one of 12 bridges in the southwestern part of the state (including New Haven) with safety inspection ratings so low they are considered to be in critical condition. The ratings for these bridges were worse than the Interstate 35W bridge in Minneapolis, which collapsed during rush hour on August 1, 2007.

== Junction list ==
The entire route is in Fairfield County.

Location	mi	km	Destinations	Notes
Norwalk	0.00	0.00	US 1 (Cross Street / North Avenue)	Southern terminus
Norwalk	0.59	0.95	To Route 15 north / Merritt Parkway north – New Haven	Access via SR 719
Norwalk	0.83	1.34	US 7 to I-95 / Route 15 south / Merritt Parkway south – New York City, Danbury	Exit 2 on US 7
Norwalk	1.00	1.61	Riverside Avenue (SR 809 south)	
Norwalk	2.51	4.04	Route 15 / Merritt Parkway – New Haven, New York City	Exit 16 on Merritt Parkway
New Canaan	4.30	6.92	Route 106 – New Canaan, Wilton	
New Canaan	8.37	13.47	NY 123 north – Ridgefield	Continuation into New York
1.000 mi = 1.609 km; 1.000 km = 0.621 mi
