= History of Westchester County =

History of a county in New York state

Coordinates: 41.15°N 73.85°W

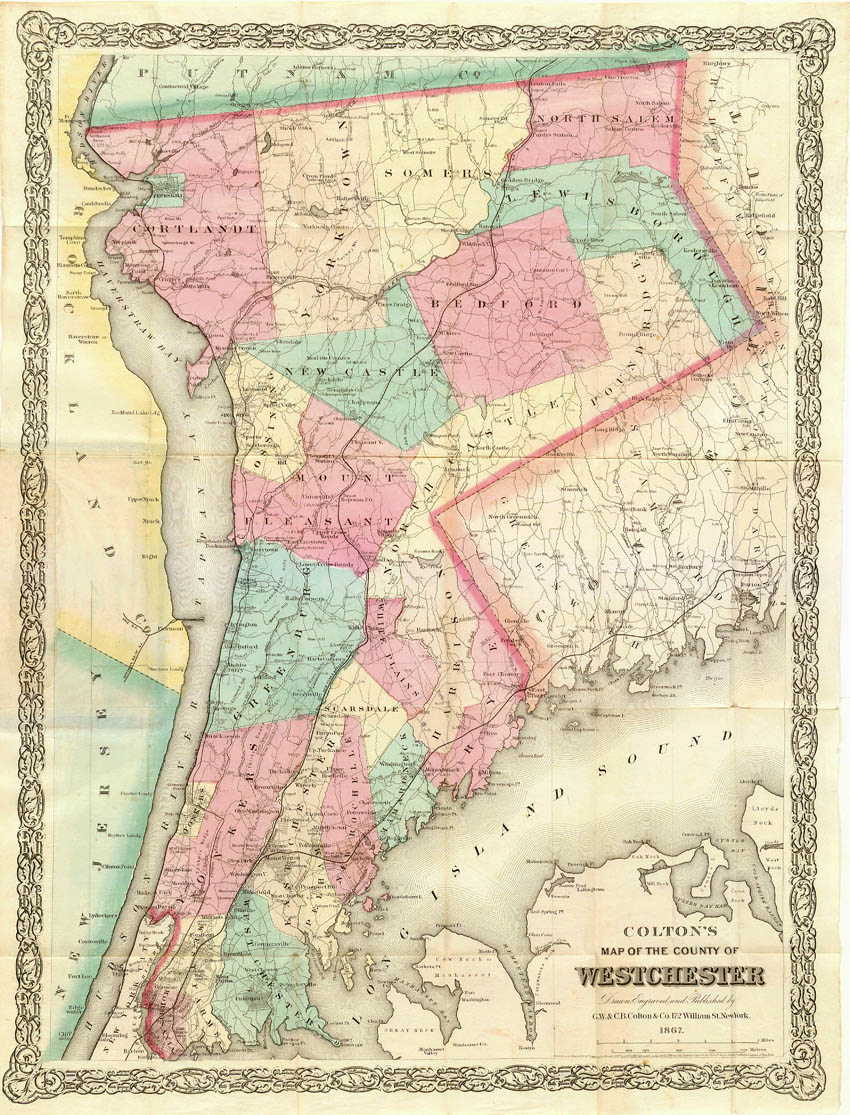
1867 map of Westchester County

The history of Westchester County, a county in the state of New York, can be traced back to the founding of a settlement between the Hudson River and Long Island Sound in the 17th century. The area now known as Westchester County had seen human occupation since at least the Archaic period, but significant growth in the settlements that are now incorporated into the county did not occur until the Industrial Revolution.

== Prehistory ==
At the time of European contact in the 16th and 17th centuries, the Native American inhabitants of present Westchester County were part of the Algonquian peoples, whose name for themselves was Lenape, meaning the people. They called the region Lenapehoking, which consisted of the area around and between the Delaware and Hudson Rivers. Two related languages, collectively known as the Delaware languages, were spoken throughout the region: Unami and Munsee. They were part of the larger Algonquian language family and related to Mahican. Munsee was spoken by the inhabitants of present-day Westchester County as well as on Manhattan Island. Some ethnographers, lacking valid contemporary sources, simply referred to the various tribes of the area as Munsee speakers, or, even more generally, as Lenni Lenape.

Title deeds given to European settlers supply considerable information on the sub-tribes in the region and their locations. The Manhattans occupied the island known by that name today, as well as the part of southern Westchester now covered by Yonkers. The Wecquaesgeek band of the Wappinger lived along the Hudson River and near the modern settlements of Dobbs Ferry, Tarrytown and White Plains. The Siwanoy lived along the coast of the Long Island Sound near present-day Pelham, New Rochelle, Larchmont, Mamaroneck and Rye. The northern portions of the county were occupied by smaller bands of Wappinger such as the Tankiteke, Kitchawank, and Sintsink.

== Colonial era ==
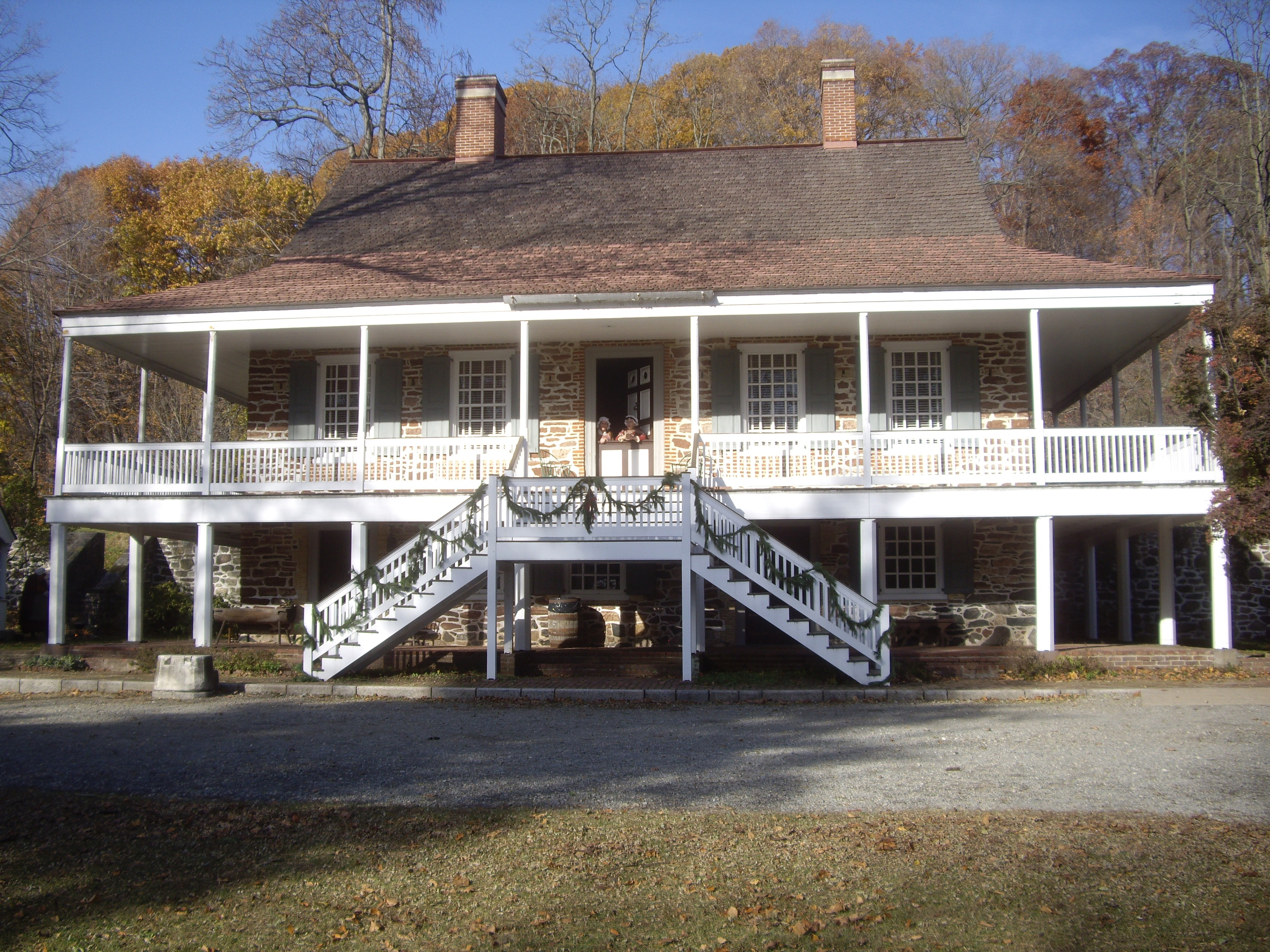
Van Cortlandt Manor

The first European explorers to visit the Westchester area were Giovanni da Verrazzano in 1524 and Henry Hudson in 1609. European settlers were initially sponsored by the Dutch West India Company in the 1620s and 1630s, while English settlers arrived from New England in the 1640s. The Timothy Knapp House in Rye is considered Westchester's oldest residential property, having been built in the 1660s. (At the time, however, Rye was still part of Connecticut Colony).

By 1664, the Dutch lost control of the area to the English and large tracts of Westchester were established as manors (held by a single owner) or patents (held by partners). The manor and patent owners leased land to tenant farmers and provided them with many essential services.

Westchester County was one of the original twelve counties of the Province of New York, created by an act of the New York General Assembly in 1683. At the time it also included present-day Bronx County, which included the original Town of Westchester and portions of Yonkers, Eastchester, and Pelham. Rye was originally part of Fairfield County, Connecticut, when that county was established in 1666. In 1683, a border agreement between the two colonies ceded Rye to Westchester County. Residents of Rye briefly revolted and "defected" back to Connecticut in the late 1690s, but the town was permanently returned to New York (and Westchester) by a royal decree in 1700.

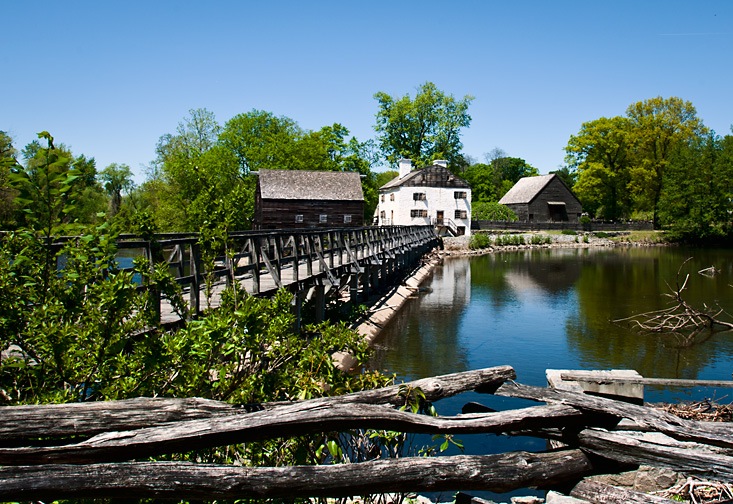
Philipsburg Manor House

During the colonial period, life in Westchester was quite primitive. The only incorporated community was the Town of Westchester. Roads were few and in poor condition, and transportation was heavily dependent on water. Nearly everything settlers consumed was raised or made on their farms. Wood, cattle and food were bartered for the items the settlers couldn't grow or make themselves. Over time cottage industries, such as shoe and furniture making, sprang up. This led to heavier use of local roads, which encouraged improvements, which in turn spurred increased travel. Taverns catering to travelers were established and ferries were launched.

By the mid-18th century, Westchester was the richest and most populous county in the colony of New York. Much of Westchester County's land was occupied by several large manorial estates, including Philipsburg Manor and Van Cortlandt Manor. By 1789, one-third of the entire population of the county lived on these two manors. Frederick Philipse, the first lord of Philipsburg Manor, was New York's richest man. While he was also Westchester's biggest slave trader, the Census of slaves, conducted in the Province of New York in 1755, lists numerous enslaved individuals throughout Westchester's manors, other landholdings, and individual households.

== American Revolutionary War: The Neutral Ground ==
Westchester County was the location of many pivotal events of the American Revolutionary War. From late 1776 to the end of the War in 1783 it was a notorious no-man's land, known as the Neutral Ground, between the British and the American Patriot forces. George Washington's primary Continental Army headquarters was located at Continental Village, north of Peekskill, while the British were headquartered in Manhattan, New York City. The roughly 15-by-30-mile, heavily contested, 150-square-mile "neutral" zone spanned from the Croton River down to the present-day Bronx neighborhoods of Kingsbridge and Morrisania, encompassing all of central and southern Westchester.

The 1776 Battle of White Plains was a significant Revolutionary War battle fought in Westchester. Other, smaller-scale notable military engagements in Westchester included the Action at Tarrytown and the battles of Pell's Point, Mamaroneck, Edgar's Lane, Pound Ridge, Young's House, and Pine's Bridge. Philipse Manor Hall (in what is now Yonkers) served as a temporary headquarters for British General Sir Henry Clinton in the summer of 1779. There, he wrote the Philipsburg Proclamation, which declared all Patriot-owned slaves to be free and that blacks taken prisoner while serving in Patriot forces would be sold into slavery.

In July-August 1781, both the Continental Army under the command of George Washington and the Expédition Particulière under the command of Jean-Baptiste de Rochambeau marched through Westchester before joining forces at Dobbs Ferry. The combined Philipsburg Encampment of the two armies was a key strategic point for launching the Yorktown campaign. The two armies would reunite again in Westchester, at Verplanck's Point, in September 1782, during their return from Yorktown.

The county was devastated by the war. Westchester families were often divided between Patriot and Loyalist sympathies. Loyalist military units sprang into being. Local historian Henry Steiner writes: "The character of the fighting in Westchester County was as much that of a civil war as it was a war for independence." The Neutral Ground was pillaged by both sides. Loyalist factions such as Queen's Rangers, Cortlandt Skinner's Greens (nicknamed the "Skinners," a term applied to marauders at the time) and De Lancey's Cowboys were engaged in cattle theft and looting. Members of these groups often employed guerrilla warfare to settle old scores against their own enemies. Bands of irregular cavalry provisioning American troops and gathering military intelligence for the Continental Army also operated in the Neutral Ground. Warfare and looting caused many residents to abandon their homes and flee the area. Many others joined Westchester County Militia regiments or served as crucial scouts, guides, and foragers for the Continental Army, knowing the terrain well. James Fenimore Cooper's novel The Spy is set in the Neutral Ground.

Although the Revolutionary War devastated the county, the post-war recovery was rapid. Large estates belonging to Loyalists were confiscated by the state and sold by the Commissioners of Forfeiture to former tenant farmers, Revolutionary War veterans, and industrious newcomers. In total, fifty-four Westchester Loyalist estates were confiscated and sold, with the massive Philipsburg Manor being the largest. The nearby–and now booming–New York City offered a ready market for Westchester's agricultural products and emerging industries. In 1788, five years after the war ended, the county was divided into 20 towns. In 1798, the first federal census recorded a population of 24,000 for the county.

== 19th century ==
In 1800, the first commercial toll road, the Westchester Turnpike, which ran through Pelham and New Rochelle, was chartered. Other toll roads, including the Croton (Somerstown) Turnpike, were later established. During this same period, steamboats began to be used on the Hudson River. The expansion of transportation options encouraged economic growth. Larger industries were established, such as iron foundries in Peekskill and Port Chester, brickyards in Verplank and Croton, and marble quarries in Ossining and Tuckahoe.

Two developments in the first half of the 19th century – the construction of the first Croton Dam and Aqueduct, and the coming of the railroad – had enormous impact on the growth of both Westchester and New York City. The Croton Dam and Aqueduct was begun in 1837 and completed in 1842. The aqueduct carried water 41 miles (66 km) from Croton to two reservoirs in Manhattan to be distributed to the city. Now a National Historic Landmark, the Croton Aqueduct is considered one of the great engineering achievements of the 19th century.

In the 1840s, the first railroads were built in Westchester. In 1844, the New York and Harlem Railroad reached White Plains. The Hudson River Railroad (Note: The Hudson River Railroad later became part of the New York Central Railroad and is currently the Hudson Line of the Metro-North Railroad.) was completed to Peekskill in 1849, as was the New York and New Haven Railroad's route through eastern Westchester. The railroads often determined whether a town grew or declined, and they contributed to a population shift from Northern to Southern Westchester. By 1860, the total county population was 99,000, with the largest city being Yonkers. Many small downtowns, centered on railroad stations, flourished.

Before and during the American Civil War, the Underground Railroad ran through Westchester, with vital stops in Hastings-on-Hudson and Tarrytown. The 17th New York Infantry Regiment ("Westchester Chasseurs"), an infantry regiment in the Union Army during the Civil War, was recruited heavily from Westchester County and nicknamed "Chasseurs" (French for hunters/riflemen) to reflect their specialized light infantry role. Westchester Chasseurs fought in the Peninsula campaign, the Second Battle of Bull Run, and the Battles of Antietam, Fredericksburg, and Chancellorsville.

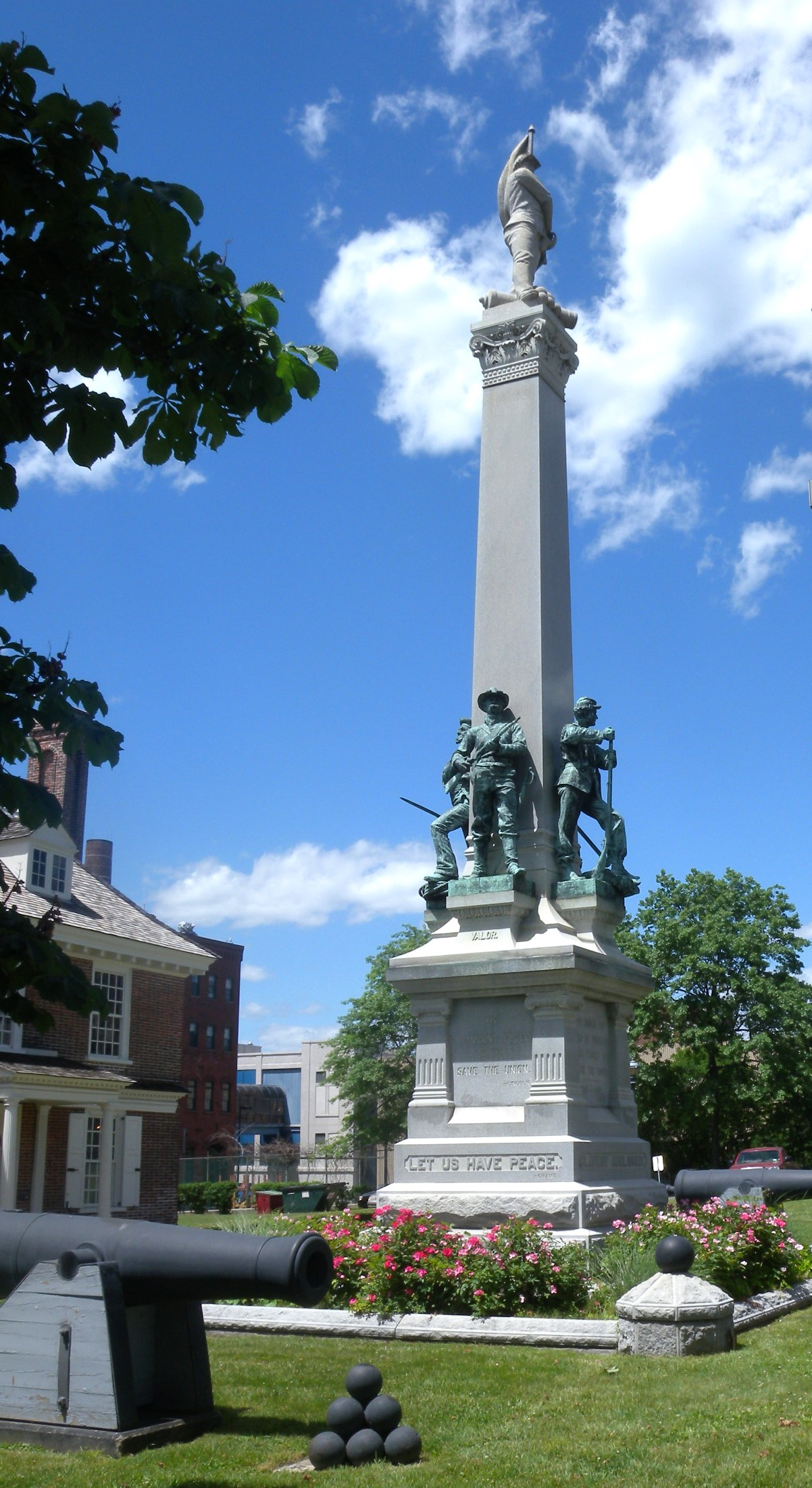
Civil War monument at Philipse Manor Hall in Getty Square, Yonkers

The period following the American Civil War enabled entrepreneurs in the New York area to create fortunes, and many built large estates in Westchester. Several mansions of this era are preserved and open to the public, including: Lyndhurst in Tarrytown, Kykuit in Pocantico Hills, the Jay Heritage Center in Rye, Caramoor in Katonah and Glenview in Yonkers.

Expansion of the New York City water supply system also impacted local development, as new dams, bridges and roads were built. The flooding of thousands of acres for reservoirs created considerable dislocations in many towns north of White Plains. The building of the New Croton Dam and its reservoir, for instance, resulted in the relocation of the hamlet of Katonah to higher ground. In North Salem, the hamlet of Purdys was moved when five percent of the town was inundated.

During the latter half of the 19th century, Westchester's transportation system and labor force attracted a manufacturing base, particularly along the Hudson River and Nepperhan Creek. Pills and patent medicines were manufactured in Ossining; greenhouses in Irvington; beer in Dobbs Ferry; sugar, paving materials and conduit in Hastings; and in Yonkers, elevators and carpets.

In 1874, the western portion of the present Bronx County, consisting of the towns of Kingsbridge, West Farms, and Morrisania, was transferred to the City & County of New York; and in 1895 the remainder of present-day Bronx County, consisting of the Town of Westchester (centered on the present-day Westchester Square) and portions of the towns of Eastchester and Pelham, was also transferred to the City & County of New York. Prior to that, a portion of the town of Eastchester had seceded, to become the city of Mount Vernon. In 1898, these annexed portions were formed into the Borough of the Bronx. In January 1914, The Bronx was split off from New York County and Bronx County was created, thus making the Borough of Manhattan & the County of New York coterminous with each other.

== 20th century ==
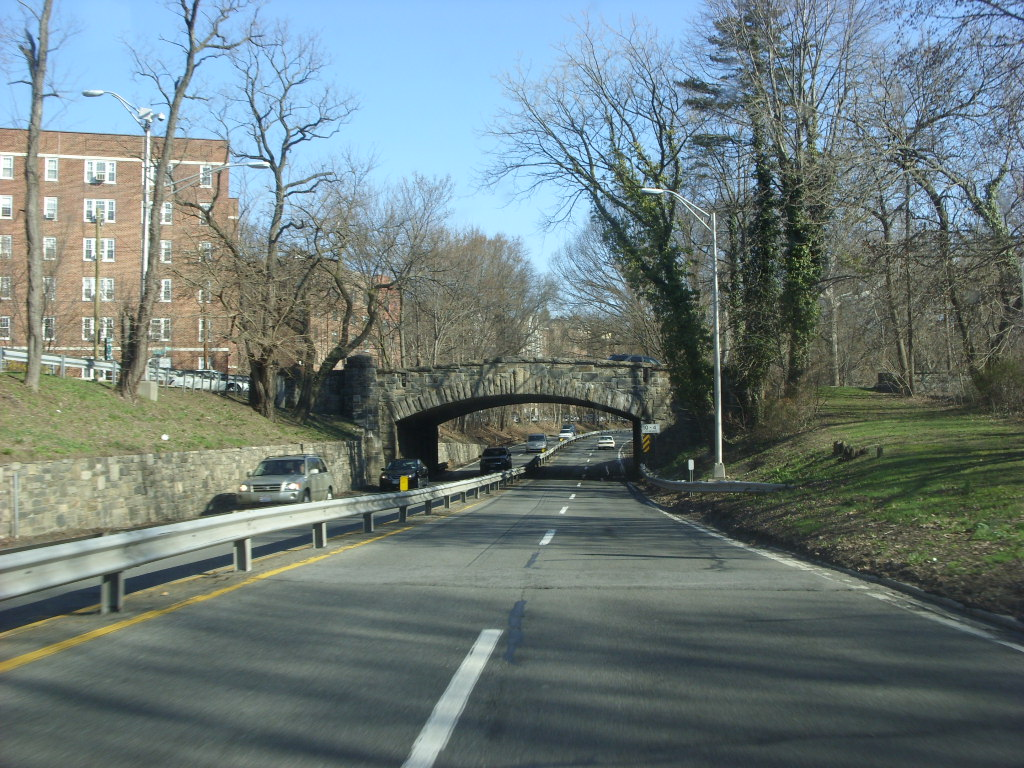
Bronx River Parkway in 2009

During the 20th century, the rural character of Westchester would transform into that of a suburban county known today. Between the county's railroad network and the proliferation of the automobile in the early 20th century, working in New York City and living in the country became possible for the middle class. In 1907, the Bronx River Commission, a joint venture between New York City and Westchester County, was established to improve the river's water quality. The commission's efforts led to the creation of the Bronx River Parkway Reservation, completed in 1925, and the first modern, multi-lane limited-access roadway in North America. The success of the Bronx River Parkway encouraged the county government to develop its park system, preserving great tracts of open space. Several other of America's first, and most scentic, parkways were built in Westchester County. These parkways—named Hutchinson River, Saw Mill River, and Cross County—were considered far ahead of their time and the forerunners of many highways to follow.

Playland in Rye, a National Historic Landmark, opened to the public in 1928, the first planned amusement park in the country, and is operated by Westchester County to this day. The development of Westchester's parks and parkway systems supported existing communities and encouraged the establishment of new ones, transforming the development pattern for Westchester. Homes were constructed on former estates and farms. New businesses appeared in response to expanded markets; White Plains, with branches of many New York City stores, became the county's central shopping district. With the need for homes expanding after World War II, multistory apartment houses appeared in the urbanized areas of the county, while the market for single-family houses continued to expand. By 1950, the total County population was 625,816.

Major interstate highways were constructed in Westchester during the 1950s and 1960s. The establishment of these roadways, along with the construction of the Tappan Zee Bridge, encouraged many major corporations, such as PepsiCo, General Foods, Ciba-Geigy and IBM to establish headquarters in Westchester.

== 21st century ==
Since the mid-20th century suburban boom, Westchester has ranked among the ten richest of the nation's more than 3,000 counties in terms of the average household income. In the 21st century, it consistently sits within the top tiers, with towns like Scarsdale and Rye frequently ranking as the wealthiest in the U.S.

At the same time, Westchester has long been facing a housing affordability crisis. As in other wealthy suburban counties nationwide, it is largely caused by local zoning laws that restrict housing development and keep homes out of reach for low-to-moderate-income residents, thus hindering economic and social mobility. These laws include strict bans on multi-family housing and requirements for large, single-family lots, which effectively bar entry to lower-income families of color. As a result, some of Westchester communities and school districts have remained deeply segregated. In 2021, five of the county’s 46 school districts had student populations that were over 90% non-white. Although nearly 15% of the county's residents are Black, they owned only 3% of the county's businesses in 2025.

Advocates for restrictive zoning regulations have maintained that these rules were essential for preventing urban overcrowding and mitigating fiscal strain—a stance reinforced by public referendums that repeatedly defeated multifamily housing proposals. Urban planning and housing reform have become the most pressing issues on the county's political docket of the 2020s.

Politically, Westchester has moved from a "swing" county to a Democratic Party stronghold; the 2020 and 2024 presidential elections saw record-high Democratic margins in the region. This shift mirrored a nationwide trend (started in the 1990s) in which affluent, highly educated suburbs were moving toward the Democratic Party.

Since the late 20th century, population growth in Westchester has been driven by significant international migration and, notably, an increase in the Hispanic population (between 1990 and 2010, it grew by 22%). By 2020, the county population exceeded 1,000,000, with the growth in the Hispanic population once again accounting for the majority of the overall population increase during that decade. According to the July 2024 census, 27.5% of Westchester residents identified as Hispanic or Latino. The migration of Hispanic and Latino populations to Westchester County has been driven by growing economic opportunities in the hospitality, domestic services, and construction sectors, as well as a desire for a safer quality of life compared to more urbanized areas.

== See also ==
- List of counties in New York
- National Register of Historic Places listings in Westchester County, New York
- USS Westchester County (LST-1167)
- Downstate New York
- List of U.S. counties by GDP
