= Truesdale =

Truesdale may refer to:

== Place in the United States ==
- Truesdale, Iowa, a city
- Truesdale, Missouri, a city
- Truesdale Lake, New York

== People ==
- Truesdale (surname), a list of people with the surname

== Fictional characters ==
- Truesdale, in the 1935 motion picture Shanghai
- Roy Truesdale, protagonist of the second half of Protector, a science fiction novel by Larry Niven
- Syrus Truesdale, in the Yu-Gi-Oh! GX anime series
- Will Truesdale, in the novel The Piano Teacher by Janice Y. K. Lee
- Zane Truesdale, in the Yu-Gi-Oh! GX anime series

== Other uses ==
- Truesdale Hospital, Fall River, Massachusetts, United States, a former hospital on the National Register of Historic Places
