= New York State Route 123 =

State highway in Westchester County, New York, US

New York State Route 123
- Smith Ridge Road
- Map of Westchester County in southeastern New York with NY 123 highlighted in red

Route information
- Maintained by NYSDOT
- Length: 4.68 mi (7.53 km)
- Existed: 1930–present

Major junctions
- South end: Route 123 at the Connecticut state line in Vista
- North end: NY 35 in South Salem

Location
- Country: United States
- State: New York
- Counties: Westchester

Highway system
- New York Highways; Interstate; US; State; Reference; Parkways
← NY 122	→ NY 124

New York State Route 123 (NY 123) is a 4.68-mile (7.53 km) north–south state highway in the northern part of Westchester County, New York, in the United States. The route, named Smith Ridge Road, is a northward continuation of Route 123 from New Canaan, Connecticut.

== Route description ==
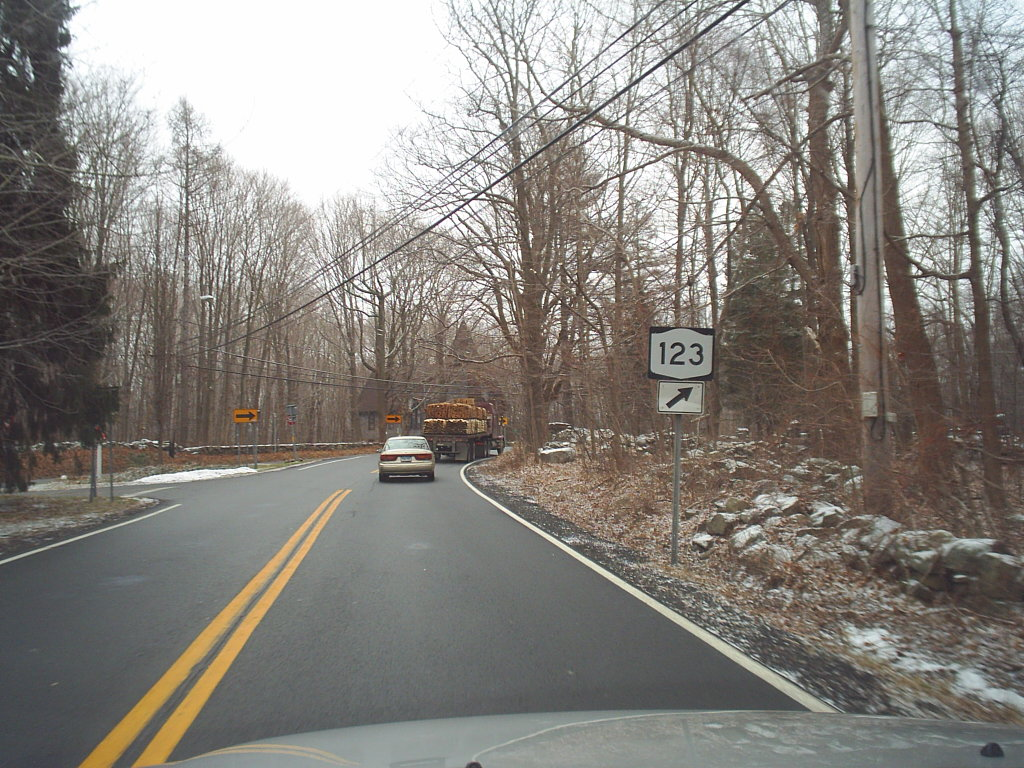
NY 123 through Lewisboro

NY 123 begins at the New York–Connecticut state line in the town of Lewisboro, as a continuation of CT 123 (Smith Ridge Road). After crossing the state line, NY 123 is immediately within the hamlet of Vista, passing a couple businesses and residences as Smith Ridge Road. By the intersection with Kingswood Lane, NY 123 is now entirely residential, bending northwest as a two-lane highway through Lewisboro. A short distance later, NY 123 intersects with West Road, where it turns northward into a large commercial district before returning to the wooded residential backdrop. Near Conant Valley Road, the route bends northeast before the junction with Elmwood Road, where it turns north once again.

After Elmwood Road, NY 123 continues north through Lewisboro, running as a two-lane wooded road into the hamlet of Lewisboro. The hamlet is residential, with NY 123 passing several residential streets on its way north. This continues as the route proceeds northward, intersecting with West Lane, which connects NY 123 to Spring Hill Lane. After making a dart to the northwest, the route intersects with the western terminus of Spring Hill Lane, which connects to the former alignment of CT 35A after crossing the state line. At that junction, NY 123 darts north, northwest then north once more before intersecting with NY 35 (Cross River Road) just east of South Salem and west of the Connecticut state line.

== History ==
NY 123 was first designated in the 1930 renumbering of state highways in New York as a continuation of the road leading north from Norwalk, Connecticut. The original route began in Vista, as it does today, but extended past its current northern end, heading west along modern NY 35 to NY 121 in the hamlet of Cross River. It was extended further westward over current NY 35 to NY 22 in Katonah c. 1940. Modern NY 35 in Westchester County was created in the early 1940s, at which time NY 123 was cut back to its current northern terminus.

== Major intersections ==
The entire route is in Lewisboro, Westchester County.

mi	km	Destinations	Notes
0.00	0.00	Route 123 south – New Canaan	Continuation into Connecticut
4.68	7.53	NY 35 – Cross River, Ridgefield, CT	Northern terminus
1.000 mi = 1.609 km; 1.000 km = 0.621 mi
