= Truesdale Lake (New York) =

- Location within New York
- Location: Northern Westchester, New York
- Coordinates: 41°17′01″N 73°33′34″W
- Type: lake
- Max. length: 1 mile (1.6 km)
- Max. width: 3/8 mile (0.60 km)
- Surface area: 83.3-acre (337,000 m^{2})

Lake Truesdale is located in the hamlet of South Salem, part of the Town of Lewisboro, in northern Westchester County, New York. The 83.3-acre (337,000 m^{2}) lake is just under 1 mile (1.6 km) long and about 3/8 mile (0.60 km) across at its widest point. The primary water flow into the lake comes from the swamp on Pumping Station Road in Ridgefield, Connecticut.

The lake was created in 1927 by damming a stream and flooding Hoyt's pond and surrounding swamp. Two homeowners' associations (Truesdale Lake Property Owners' Association - TLPOA, and Truesdale Estates Association - TEA) manage the lake and maintain two beaches available to their members.
