= Joy Masoff =

American writer

Joy Masoff (born 1951) is an American children's book and textbook author.

== Career ==
The Virginia public schools have approved 14 of her books, all of which are published by Five Ponds Press. Her children's books include Fire!, Emergency, Oh Yuck! The Encyclopedia of Everything Nasty, and Oh Yikes! History's Grossest Moments.

Some of her works grew out of her work as a Cub Scout den leader and with Brownies.

=== Criticism of Our Virginia: Past and Present ===
In October 2010, a historian Carol Sheriff, who is a professor at the College of William and Mary, called into question Masoff's scholarship in writing a fourth grade textbook entitled, Our Virginia: Past and Present. Masoff wrote that thousands of slaves fought in the American Civil War on the side of the South, which is rejected by most historians. Masoff explained that Virginia state curriculum requires that the role of African Americans in the war be covered, so she used the internet to research the topic and found three sources. However, all three sources traced back to the Sons of Confederate Veterans, who do not believe that slavery caused the Civil War. Masoff said, "It's just one sentence. I don't want to ruffle any feathers, If the historians had contacted me and asked me to take it out, I would have."

On October 21, the publisher of Our Virginia: Our Past and Present announced that it would distribute sticker labels that could be used to cover the disputed paragraph. Subsequently, another error was spotted regarding a claim that brown bears live in the Blue Ridge Mountains, when in fact only black bears inhabit that area. The publisher announced that both statements would be removed from the second edition of the book.

School system reactions to the controversy varied. Loudoun County, public schools pulled Our Virginia: Past and Present from its classrooms, while neighboring Prince William County, although not using the book at the time, put it and five other Five Pond Press books under consideration.

== Personal life ==
Masoff is the mother of two and lives with her family in Waccabuc, New York.

== Bibliography ==
=== Textbooks ===
- Masoff, Joy (2000). American Revolution, 1700-1800. New York: Scholastic Reference. ISBN 0-439-05109-6. LCCN 99053695.
- Masoff, Joy (2000). Colonial times, 1600-1700. New York: Scholastic Reference. ISBN 978-0-439-05107-1. LCCN 99056243.
- Masoff, Joy (2002). Mali : land of gold & glory. Waccabuc, NY: Five Ponds Press. ISBN 0-9727156-0-6. LCCN 2003271444.

=== Children's books ===
- Masoff, Joy (1999). Emergency!. New York: Scholastic. ISBN 0-590-97898-5. LCCN 97026995.
- Masoff, Joy (1998). Fire!. principal photography by Jack Resnicki and Barry D. Smith. New York: Scholastic Reference. ISBN 0-590-97872-1. LCCN 97010928.
- Masoff, Joy (2000). Oh, yuck! : the encyclopedia of everything nasty. illustrated by Terry Sirrell. New York: Workman Pub. ISBN 0-7611-0771-1. LCCN 99043603.
- Masoff, Joy (2002). Everest : reaching for the sky. New York: Scholastic Reference. ISBN 0-439-26707-2. LCCN 2001020757.
- Masoff, Joy (2002). Snowboard! : your guide to freeriding, pipe & park, jibbing, backcountry, alpine, boardercross, and more. illustrations by Jack Dickason. Washington, D. C.: National Geographic Society. ISBN 0-7922-6740-0. LCCN 2001044392.
- Masoff, Joy (2006). Oh, yikes! : history's grossest, wackiest moments. illustrated by Terry Sirrell. New York: Workman. ISBN 978-0-7611-3684-2. LCCN 2006045243.
- Masoff, Joy (2007). The all better now book. illustrated by Jack Dickason. New York: Lark Books. ISBN 978-1-60059-128-0. LCCN 2007021908.
