= The Homestead (Waccabuc, New York) =

Historic house in New York, United States

- U.S. National Register of Historic Places
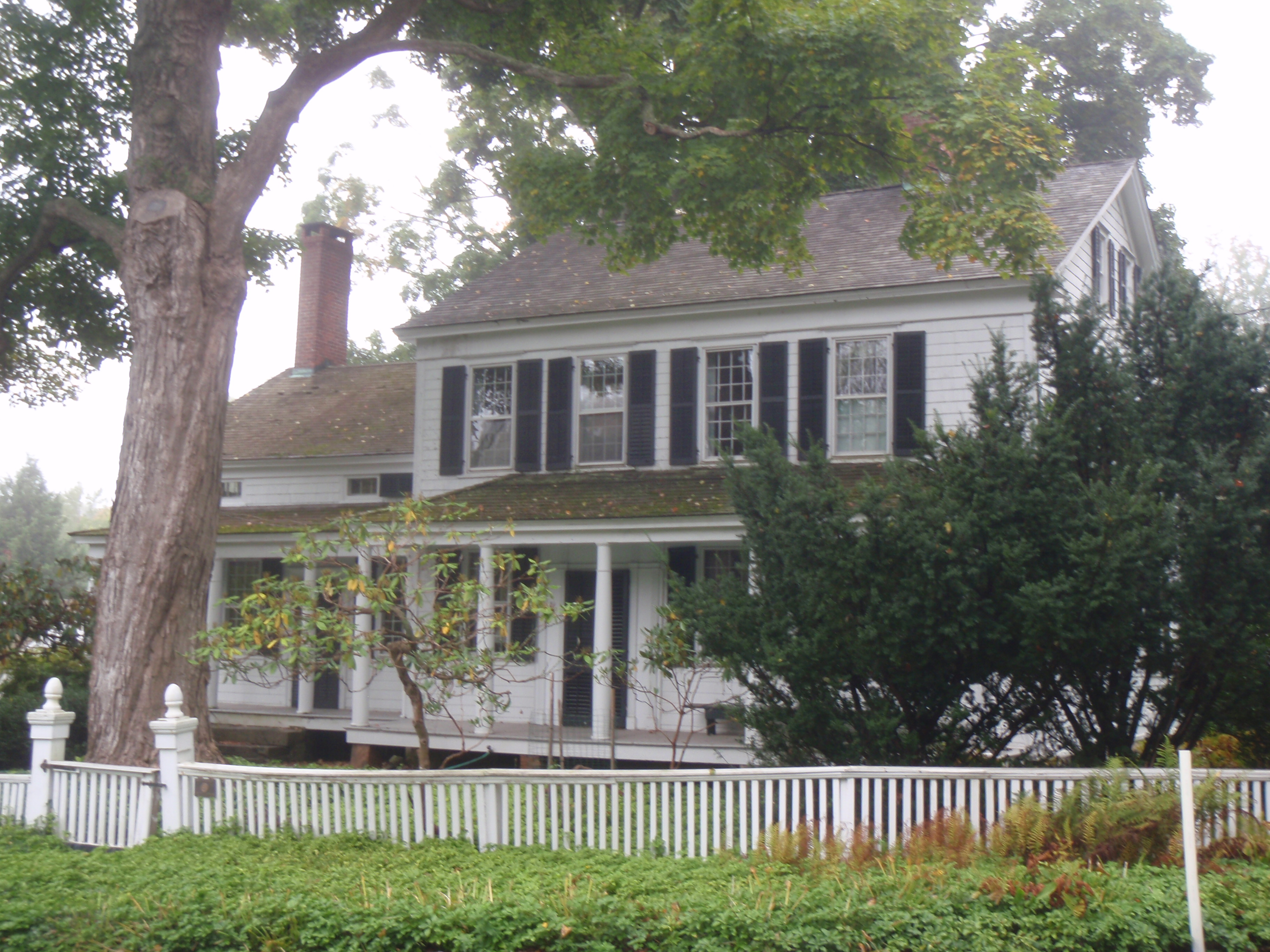
- The Mead Homestead as seen from the street named after the family it was built for.

- Location within New York Location within the United States
- Location: 36 Mead St., Waccabuc, New York
- Coordinates: 41°16′59″N 73°35′44″W
- Area: 6 acres (2.4 ha)
- Built: 1820
- Architectural style: Federal
- NRHP reference No.: 01000294
- Added to NRHP: March 29, 2001

The Homestead is a historic home located at Waccabuc, Westchester County, New York. It has five contributing buildings and one contributing structure. The main house, known as The Homestead, was built between 1820 and 1822 in the Federal style by the locally prominent Mead family. It has a four bay wide main block with a three bay ell. The frame building sits on a cut stone foundation. Also on the property is a 19th-century barn, four room cottage, tool shed (c. 1900), chicken house (c. 1900), and well house. The Mead family built the separately listed Mead Memorial Chapel.

It was added to the National Register of Historic Places in 2001.

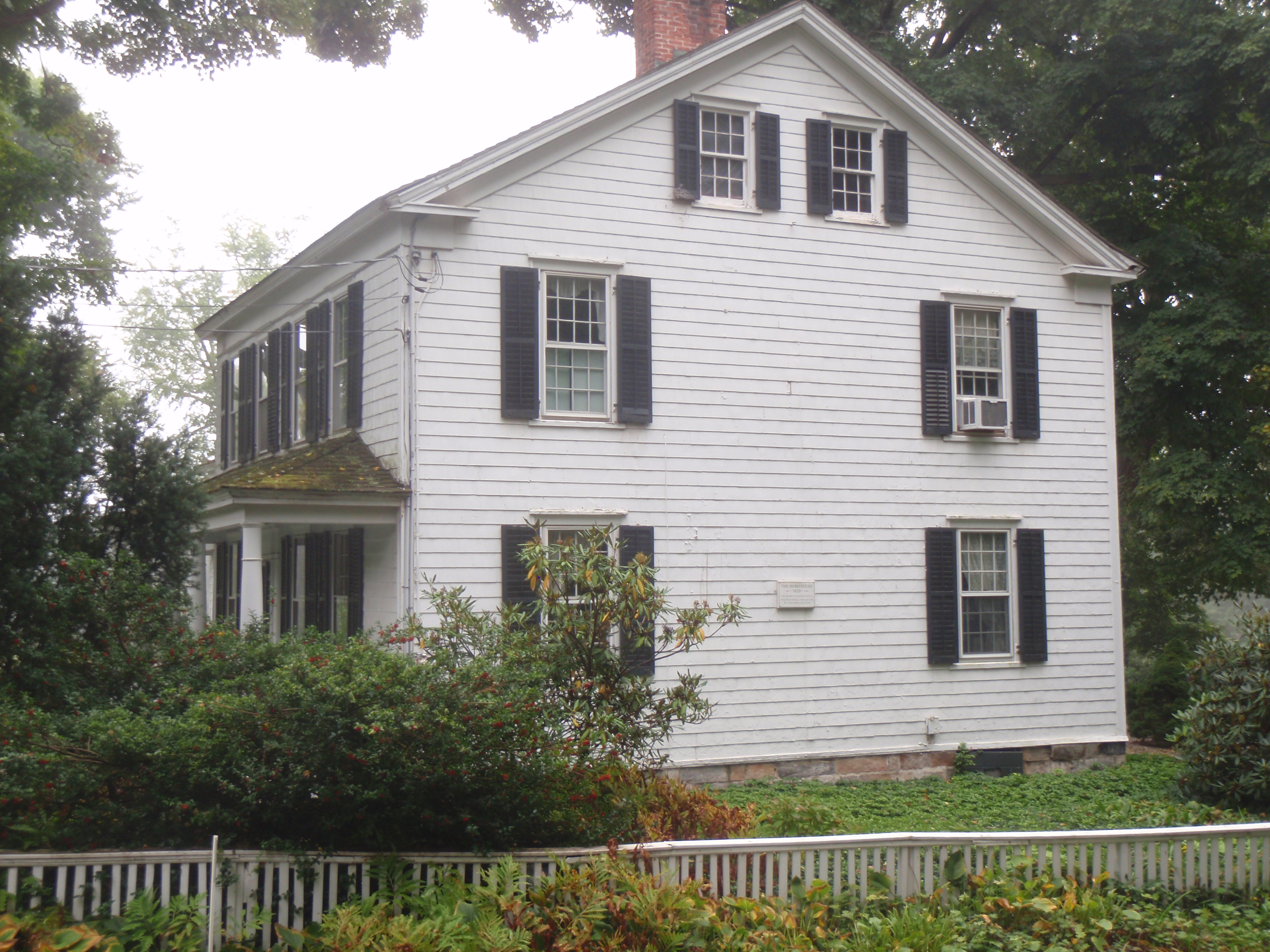
The Homestead as seen from Schoolhouse Road.

== See also ==
- National Register of Historic Places listings in northern Westchester County, New York
