= Mat Hennek =

German photographer (born 1969)

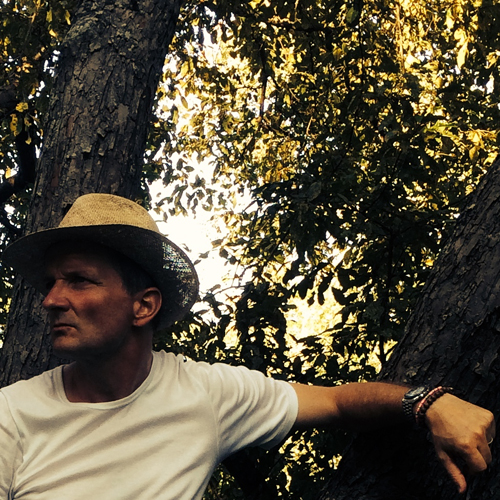
Mat Hennek

Mat Hennek (born 1969 in Freiburg im Breisgau) is a German fine art photographer.

== Career ==
Mat Hennek worked for newspapers and radio stations before starting his artistic training at Europäische Akademie für Bildende Kunst in Trier and at Lette-Verein in Berlin. In 1995 Hennek became assistant to Hermann Stamm the photographer Uwe Arens.

His photographs were published in magazines worldwide: Cosmopolitan, Frankfurter Allgemeine Zeitung, GQ, Marie Claire, Max, Playboy, Süddeutsche Zeitung Magazin, Vogue, ZEITmagazin.

In 1998 Hennek was founding the agency "Kasskara" in Berlin. Beyond others Mat Hennek worked for big record companies and music labels such as Deutsche Grammophon, Four Music, EMI, Sony BMG, Universal Music Group and Virgin Records.

Since then Mat Hennek took numerous portrait photographs of classical Musicians and artists: soloists such as Hilary Hahn, Krystian Zimerman, Hélène Grimaud, Lang Lang, Nelson Freire, Alison Balsom, conductors such as Simon Rattle, Kent Nagano, Claudio Abbado, Valery Gergiev and opera singers such as Rolando Villazón, Anna Netrebko, Thomas Quasthoff, Bryn Terfel and in another musical repertoire artists such as David Byrne, Lizz Wright, Rammstein, Seeed, Sting, Tracy Chapman, Rufus Wainwright, Daniel Libeskind, Alex Katz and Giora Feidman.

Furthermore, Hennek photographed advertising campaigns for well-known brands like Montblanc, Lufthansa, Rolex and Volkswagen.

In 2006 Hennek shifted the focus of his work to art photography. His fine art photography has been featured in solo exhibits in galleries, museums and art fairs in Europe, Asia and in the USA.

In 2017 the art book "Woodlands – Mat Hennek" was published by Steidl. In 2020, Steidl published Hennek's second book "Silent Cities".

== Personal life ==
Hennek lives with his partner, the French pianist Hélène Grimaud in Upstate New York, United States.

== Works ==
- The Soul of Music (Die Seele der Musik)
- Woodlands
- Ancient Writings
- Trees of Tel Aviv
- Waves of Tel Aviv
- Sounds of Spheres
- Mirages
- Dream Catchers
- Palmen im Sturm
- Sacred Spirits
- Cityscapes
- Blue Range

== Publications ==
- "Woodlands", published 2017 by Steidl
- "Silent Cities", published 2020 by Steidl
- "Sounds of Spheres", published 2023 by Steidl

== Exhibitions ==
=== Individual exhibitions ===
2009

- "Woodlands", Dramaturgie von Fotos und Musik (in Zusammenarbeit mit der Pianistin Hélène Grimaud), Mecklenburg-Vorpommern Music Festival – Germany
- "The Soul of Music | Die Seele der Musik", Villa Wahnfried, Bayreuth – Germany
- "The Soul of Music | Die Seele der Musik", Ocean Sun Festival – MS Europa / Hapag-Lloyd musikalische Kreuzfahrten
- "Woodlands", Hotel Grand Hyatt Berlin – Germany

2010

- "Woodlands and beyond...", Flo Peters Gallery, Hamburg – Germany
- "Woodlands and beyond...", Private Sammlung Roosen-Trinks, Berlin – Germany

2011

- "The2Circles" Galerie 64bis, Paris – France
- "The2Circles" Bernheimer Fine Art Photography, Munich – Germany
- "The2Circles" Leica Galerie Salzburg – Austria
- "The2Circles" Hammer Gallery, Zürich – Switzerland
- "Die Seele der Music | The Soul of Music" Leica Gallery Tokyo – Japan

2012

- "Woodlands and beyond..." 1839 Contemporary Gallery Taipei – Taiwan

2014

- "The Soul of Music | Die Seele der Musik" Galerie Bernheimer Luzern – Switzerland

2015

- "Woodlands" Stadtmuseum Bad Hersfeld, Germany
- "WOODLANDS and beyond…” Flo Peters Gallery Hamburg, Germany

=== Group exhibitions ===
2009

- "Landscapes", Bernheimer Fine Art Photography, Munich – Germany
- "Let's Party für ein Kunstwerk", Pinakothek der Moderne, Munich – Germany

2010

- "Inner Landscapes, Contemporary Israeli Photography", Bernheimer Fine Art Photography, Munich – Germany
- "Schauplätze", Villa Erlengut, Erlenbach am Zürichsee – Switzerland
- Paris Photo 2010 – Carrousel du Louvre – Bernheimer Fine Art Photography – France

2011

- "Janvier sous la neige", Galerie Baudoin Lebon, Paris – France
- Montblanc International Exhibit, Genf – Switzerland

2012

- Ærena Galleries & Gardens, California – USA

2015

- "Summertime" Galerie Bernheimer, Munich – Germany
- Paris Photo 2015 – Grand Palais Paris – Bernheimer Fine Art Photography – France

2016

- artgenève 2016 – Palexpo SA Genf – Bernheimer Fine Art – Geneva, Switzerland
- "Booth D9 – Sélection Paris Photo – Bernheimer Fine Art, Lucerne – Switzerland
- Pictorial Recital: "WOODLANDS and beyond…" Elbphilharmonie Hamburg, Germany
- artgenève 2017 – Palexpo SA Genf – Bernheimer Fine Art – Geneva, Switzerland
- "THE WORLD IS A BOOK AND THOSE WHO DO NOT TRAVEL READ ONLY ONE PAGE." Bernheimer Fine Art, Lucerne, Switzerland
- "C.A.R. – Contemporary Art Ruhr" – Immagis Fine Art Photography – Essen, Germany
- "Highlights" Intern. Art Fair – Bernheimer Fine Art – Munich, Germany

2017

- Paris Photo 2017 | Grand Palais – Bernheimer Fine Art Photography | Paris, France | 09.11 – 12 November 2017
- Pictorial Recital: "WOODLANDS and beyond…" | Photo Installation: Mat Hennek / Piano: Hélène Grimaud | Philharmonie Paris | Paris, France | 25 October 2017
- Pictorial Recital: "WOODLANDS and beyond…" | Photo Installation: Mat Hennek / Piano: Hélène Grimaud | BASF Feierabendhaus | Ludwigshafen, Germany | 23 October 2017
- Pictorial Recital: "WOODLANDS and beyond…" | Photo Installation: Mat Hennek / Piano: Hélène Grimaud | KKL Lucerne | Lucerne, Switzerland | 21 October 2017
- Pictorial Recital: "WOODLANDS and beyond…" | Photo Installation: Mat Hennek / Piano: Hélène Grimaud | Elbphilharmonie | Hamburg, Germany | 26 June 2017
- Pictorial Recital: "WOODLANDS and beyond…" | Photo Installation: Mat Hennek / Piano: Hélène Grimaud | Elbphilharmonie | Hamburg, Germany | 8 April 2017
- Launch of the book "Woodlands – Mat Hennek", published by Steidl | Flo Peters Gallery | Hamburg, Germany | 7 April 2017
- artgenève | palexpo SA – Bernheimer Fine Art | Genève – Switzerland | 26.01. – 29 January 2017
- "THE WORLD IS A BOOK AND THOSE WHO DO NOT TRAVEL READ ONLY ONE PAGE." Group exhibition | Bernheimer Fine Art | Lucerne – Switzerland | 20 October 2016 – 21 January 2017

2018

- Pictorial Recital: "WOODLANDS and beyond…" | Photo Installation: Mat Hennek / Piano: Hélène Grimaud | Kulturpalast, Dresden, Germany | 8 June 2018
- Pictorial Recital: "WOODLANDS and beyond…" | Photo Installation: Mat Hennek / Piano: Hélène Grimaud | Klavier-Festival Ruhr, Wuppertal, Germany | 6 June 2018
- Pictorial Recital: "WOODLANDS and beyond…" | Photo Installation: Mat Hennek / Piano: Hélène Grimaud | Philharmonie, Gasteig, Munich, Germany | 3 March 2018

2019

- MAESTRI – MUSIK UND LEIDENSCHAFT | Group Exhibit | CAMERA WORK | Berlin | 15 June 2019 – 10 August 2019
