= Mead Memorial Chapel =

- U.S. National Register of Historic Places
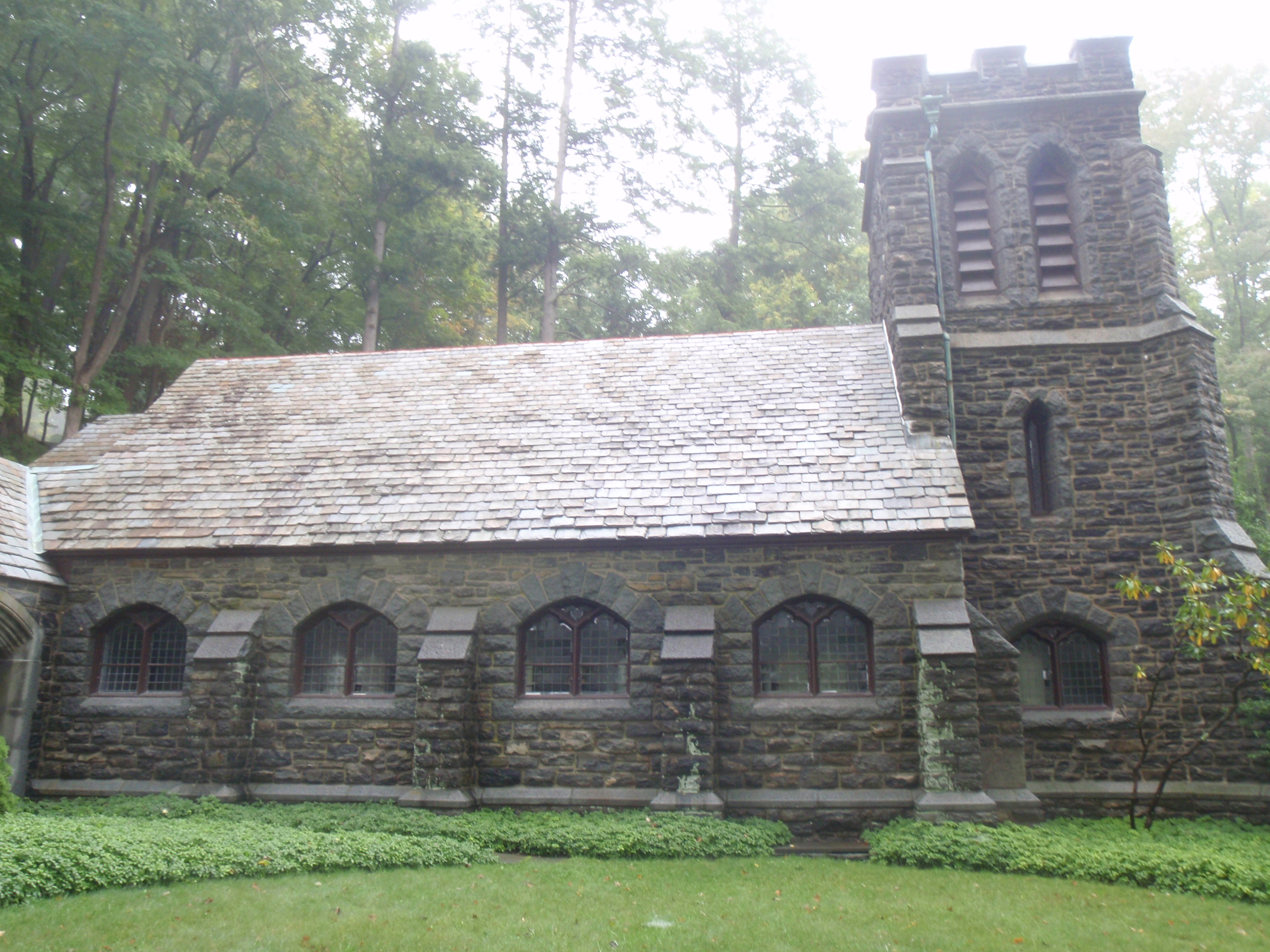

- Location within New York Location within the United States
- Location: 2 Chapel Rd., Lewisboro, New York
- Coordinates: 41°17′47″N 73°35′59″W
- Area: 1.1 acres (0.45 ha)
- Built: 1905
- Architect: Hobart B. Upjohn
- Architectural style: Late Gothic Revival
- NRHP reference No.: 99001443
- Added to NRHP: November 30, 1999

Mead Memorial Chapel is a historic Episcopal chapel at 2 Chapel Road in the hamlet of Waccabuc, town of Lewisboro, Westchester County, New York. It was designed by Hobart B. Upjohn (1876-1949) and built in 1905–1906 in a late Gothic Revival style. It is a rectangular stone building with a steep slate roof. A wing was added in 1929, known as Mead Memorial Hall, and it houses the Mead family archives. It features a bell tower pierced by Gothic arch shaped louvered windows. It was built by Sarah Frances Studwell Mead as a memorial to her husband, George Washington Mead (1827-1899). The Mead family also owned the separately listed The Homestead.

It was added to the National Register of Historic Places in 1999.

== See also ==
- National Register of Historic Places listings in northern Westchester County, New York
