= Marion Pritchard =

Dutch social worker, hero of the resistance

- Van Binsbergen (Pritchard) in 1944 with Erica Polak, a Jewish baby that she was hiding
- Born: Marion Philippina van Binsbergen; 7 November 1920; Amsterdam, Netherlands
- Died: 11 December 2016 (aged 96); Washington, D.C., United States
- Known for: Rescuing Dutch Jews during World War II

Marion Philippina Pritchard (née van Binsbergen; 7 November 1920 – 11 December 2016) was a Dutch-American social worker and psychoanalyst, who distinguished herself as a savior of Jews in the Netherlands during the Second World War. Pritchard helped save approximately 150 Dutch Jews, most of them children, throughout the German occupation of the Netherlands. In addition to protecting these people’s lives, she was imprisoned by Nazis, worked in collaboration with the Dutch resistance, and shot dead a known Dutch informer to the Nazis to save Dutch Jewish children.

== Early life ==
Pritchard was born Marion Philippina van Binsbergen on 7 November 1920 in Amsterdam and grew up in the Netherlands. She was the daughter of liberal judge Jacob van Binsbergen, who was on the board of regents for the prisons of Amsterdam. Her parents encouraged her to express her feelings and to expect honest answers from them. She recalled going to school with Jews in every class and reported that they were "considered Dutch like everyone else". At age 19, she enrolled in a school for social work in Amsterdam.

== German occupation of the Netherlands ==
The German Army invaded and occupied the Netherlands in May 1940. During her social work studies, Pritchard (then van Binsbergen) was arrested while staying overnight during curfew with friends, who—unbeknownst to her—had been distributing transcripts of Allied radio broadcasts, and was imprisoned for seven months.

In the spring of 1942, Pritchard witnessed a round-up of Jewish children's home occupants, including babies and eight-year-olds, being picked up by their limbs or hair and thrown into trucks to be taken away by Nazis, along with two women who tried to intervene. The two other women attacked the soldiers and were also taken away in a truck. She described her reaction to witnessing this event: "I was shocked and in tears, and after that I knew my rescue work was more important than anything else I might be doing".

Pritchard first began her work as part of the Dutch underground, bringing food, clothing and papers to those in hiding from the Nazis. As part of her rescue plan, Pritchard registered Jewish infants as her own children and then placed them in safe, non-Jewish homes. She secured false identification papers and ration cards for Jewish adults. She then took on more dangerous activities when she was tasked with delivering a package to a home in the northern part of the country. Along the journey, she was given a baby girl by a stranger. Upon reaching her destination, she found out that the people she was supposed to deliver the package to had been arrested. She then took shelter with a man and his wife, originally not part of the operation, who agreed to take care of her and the baby.

Her most-noted rescue occurred in late 1942 when she sheltered Fred Polak and his three children in the servants' quarters of a friend's villa in Huizen, 24 kilometres (15 mi) outside Amsterdam. There the Polaks established a rapid process for hiding from the German inspections of the premises, which worked until in 1944 a Dutch collaborator, who had learned to return to hiding places in hopes of discovering Jews emerging from hiding after a half-hour interval, discovered the family. Pritchard saw no recourse but to reach for a revolver and shoot the man. He was secreted to a funeral home and buried in the same coffin with another person without his fate being discovered by the authorities.

She never discussed her activities with her parents or younger brother, lest they be endangered.

== Postwar life ==
After the war, Pritchard worked for the United Nations Relief and Rehabilitation Administration in Germany at displaced-persons camps. Consequently, she met and married Anton "Tony" Pritchard, the head of such a camp in Bavaria and a recently discharged United States Army officer. The Pritchards then moved to the United States in 1947 and settled in Waccabuc, New York, where she worked as a child social worker, aiding refugee families. The Pritchards had three sons, Arnold, Ivor and Brian. In 1976, she and her husband moved to Vershire, Vermont and she commenced her studies to become a psychoanalyst at the Boston Graduate School of Psychoanalysis. She then practiced as a psychoanalyst.

Pritchard died at age 96 in December 2016 from cerebral arteriosclerosis, survived by her three sons, and their progeny.

== Recognition ==
Pritchard received the following recognition for her rescue work:

- Righteous Among the Nations by Yad Vashem in 1981
- Wallenberg Medal in 1996
- A 2004 honorary Doctor of Laws degree from the University of Vermont and commemorative book from the university's Center for Holocaust Studies
- Medal of Valor at the Simon Wiesenthal Center's annual national tribute dinner in 2009
- Display at the United States Holocaust Memorial Museum
