= Waccabuc, New York =

Hamlet and lake in New York, United States

- hamlet
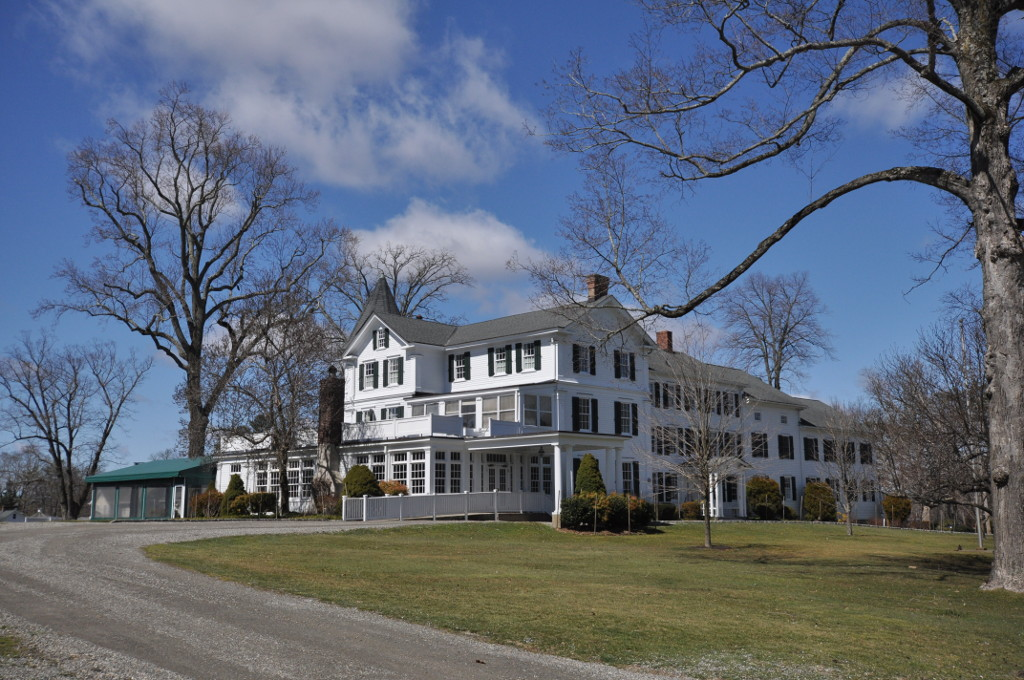
- Waccabuc Country Club

- Location within New York Location within the United States
- Coordinates: 41°17′26″N 73°35′43″W
- Country: United States
- State: New York
- County: Westchester
- Town: Lewisboro

Area
  - Total: 3.34 sq mi (8.66 km^{2})
  - Land: 3.34 sq mi (8.66 km^{2})
  - Water: 0 sq mi (0.00 km^{2})

Population
  - Total: 851
  - Density: 254.5/sq mi (98.27/km^{2})
- Time zone: UTC-5 (Eastern (EST))
  - Summer (DST): UTC-4 (EDT)
- ZIP Code: 10597
- Area code: 914
- GNIS feature ID: 968618

Waccabuc is a hamlet and lake in the town of Lewisboro, Westchester County, New York, United States. Waccabuc is considered "New York's Secret Suburb" and is home to a "collection of privacy-loving C.E.O.s and bright stars in other firmaments," according to an Upstart Business Journal article about the tremendous number of notable residents in a hamlet of just a few hundred people. Waccabuc is known by many outside the town for its Castle Rock.

Before becoming its own hamlet, Waccabuc was originally a vacation retreat established by the Mead family, who are considered one of the First Families of Westchester. The retreat prided itself for having no "tramps, bars, or malaria." A couple of the hamlet's handful of roads, such as "Tarry-a-Bit," are named after the vacation house they originally served. Waccabuc Country Club's main clubhouse sits at the site of one of the original vacation houses.

On July 1, 1956, Marilyn Monroe wed Arthur Miller in a Jewish ceremony at a private house in Waccabuc. Their nuptials were celebrated at the home of Miller's literary agent, Kay Brown. Some 30 friends and relatives attended the hastily arranged party.

The Mead Memorial Chapel and The Homestead are listed on the National Register of Historic Places. The Waccabuc Historic District was listed on July 28, 2015.

== Demographics ==
The total population of Waccabuc is just 851 people. Waccabuc is by far the smallest of Lewisboro's four hamlets, and the hamlet's strict zoning laws ensure that Waccabuc maintains a low population density not seen in any of the other hamlets. These factors combine to separate Waccabuc from the other hamlets of Lewisboro and project an image of exclusivity.

The median household income, as of 2010, was $186,554 and the average household income was $240,258. Waccabuc has a per capita income of $79,819.

The median home value was $1,243,423, earning Waccabuc a place on Forbes magazine's annual list of "America's Most Expensive ZIP Codes" and is listed above more recognizable towns in Westchester such as Scarsdale, Pound Ridge, and Chappaqua. Real estate brokers note that listings in Waccabuc priced at $600,000 could be teardown projects, despite being more than $100,000 above the median home value of the country overall.

== Residential property and conservation ==
Waccabuc is set apart from the other hamlets of Lewisboro, as well as most other towns in Westchester, in that all property must be on a minimum of two acres of land and, on most streets, the property minimum increases to four acres of land, the exception being the Hunt Farm development on hamlet's outskirts. To further maintain the beauty of Waccabuc, a 100-acre piece of land was bought by all residents of Waccabuc through the Waccabuc Land Owner's Association for conservation purposes as well as to provide hiking trails.

The Mead Memorial Chapel and The Homestead are listed on the National Register of Historic Places and the hamlet itself is a designated historic district.

A 2005 NYT story on the hamlet captured the social function of the Post Office and the locals' efforts to preserve and maintain it.

== Notable people ==
- Kay Brown, Hollywood talent scout
- Elliott Carter, composer
- Blythe Danner, actress
- Alfred DelBello, former Lieutenant Governor of New York
- William H. Donaldson, former chairman of the SEC
- Hélène Grimaud, pianist
- Bryant Gumbel, television journalist and sportscaster
- Charles S. Haight, Jr., federal judge
- Allen Hershkowitz, president and co-founder of the Green Sports Alliance, co-founder of Broadway Green Alliance, former Senior Scientist at the Natural Resources Defense Council
- William P. Lauder, CEO and President of Estee Lauder
- O. Winston Link, photographer
- David Marks, Original member of the Beach Boys
- Stanley O'Neal, former CEO and President of Merrill Lynch
- Bruce Paltrow, director and producer
- Gwyneth Paltrow, actress and singer
- Jake Paltrow, director
- Marion Pritchard, rescuer of Dutch Jews during World War II
- Ogden R. Reid, United States Representative and Ambassador to Israel
- Roger Stone, Republican Party strategist and pollster
- Christine Tucci, actress
- Stanley Tucci, actor
- Jeffrey Tambor, American actor, voice artist, and comedian
- Jean-Georges Vongerichten, French chef and culinary author
- Susi Kenna, art collector and former Director of Social Media at David Zwirner gallery, Global Social Media Director at Art Basel.
