= Northern Westchester =

Upper portion of Westchester County, New York

Northern Westchester refers to the upper portion of Westchester County, New York, a suburban area north of New York City. Lying north of Interstate 287/Cross Westchester Expressway, these communities are distinguished by distance from New York City and their more rural character from those of Southern Westchester. The area is notable for its general affluence and high degree of watershed for New York City, being home to two major collection reservoirs supplying drinking water to it, the New Croton and Kensico.

== Municipalities ==
Map showing the different areas of Northern (blue) & Southern (red) Westchester

In New York, there are three types of political subdivisions (i.e. municipalities) of counties: cities, towns, and villages. While cities are incorporated entities, towns are not. However, areas within a town can incorporate; when this occurs, the resulting area is called a "village". Villages have their own additional level of government along with the government of the town the village lies within. Some towns contain a village with the same name, which is usually also the town's center.

Certain areas of a town often develop their own identity, based around perhaps a school district or historic feature; the term for such areas which lack any other municipal designation is a hamlet, which may or may not be acknowledged by the United States Census for statistical purposes.

Villages and hamlets in Northern Westchester include:

- Armonk
- Bedford
- Briarcliff Manor
- Chappaqua
- Cortlandt
- Croton
- Katonah
- Lewisboro
- Millwood
- Mohegan Lake
- Mount Kisco
- North Castle
- North Salem
- Ossining
- Peekskill
- Pleasantville
- Pocantico Hills
- Pound Ridge
- Sleepy Hollow
- Somers
- Tarrytown
- Thornwood
- Yorktown

== Notable residents ==
- Bill and Hillary Clinton (Chappaqua)
- DMX (Mount Kisco)
- Mike Myers (Pound Ridge)
- Richard Gere (Pound Ridge)
- Audra McDonald
- Alan Menken
- Kelli O'Hara
- Nick DiPaolo
- Martha Stewart (Bedford)
- Susan Sarandon and Tim Robbins (Pound Ridge)
- George Soros (Bedford)
- Vanessa Williams (Chappaqua) (and Rick Fox, during his marriage to Williams)
- Glenn Close (Bedford)
- Bernie Williams (Armonk)

== See also ==
- Southern Westchester
