= Southern Westchester =

Southern portion of Westchester County, New York

Southern Westchester refers to the southern portion of Westchester County, New York, a dense inner-ring suburban area north of New York City.

The Westchester County Department of Planning divides the county into North, Central and South geographical sub-regions. Municipalities in Westchester are often referenced in connection to the geographical half of the county they are in; either northern or southern.

== Municipalities ==
Map showing the different areas of Northern (blue) & Southern (red) Westchester

Map showing the different areas of Northern (blue) & Southern (red) Westchester

In New York State, there are three types of political subdivisions (i.e. municipalities) of counties: cities, towns, and villages. While cities are incorporated entities, towns are not. However, areas within a town can incorporate; when this occurs, the said area is called a "village". Villages have their own additional level of government along with the government of the town the village lies within. Sometimes a town contains a village with the same name; this village usually contains the town's center.

Furthermore, certain areas of the incorporated (non-village) part of a town often develop their own identity, based around perhaps a school district or zip code; this unofficial formation is known as a hamlet and may or may not be acknowledged by the United States Census for statistical purposes. No matter how closely its residents may identify with their hamlet, a hamlet is not technically a town and has no political meaning. Rather, it could be described as a "mock village". A hamlet can incorporate into a village if a charter is drawn up and the state government approves.

- Ardsley
- Bronxville
- Dobbs Ferry
- Eastchester
- Hartsdale
- Harrison
- Hastings-on-Hudson
- Irvington
- Larchmont
- Mamaroneck Town
- Mamaroneck Village
- Mount Vernon
- New Rochelle
- Pelham Town
- Pelham Village
- Pelham Manor
- Port Chester
- Purchase
- Rye Town
- Rye Brook
- Rye City
- Scarsdale
- Tuckahoe
- White Plains
- Valhalla
- Yonkers

The Bronx was part of Westchester County until the late 19th century (the West Bronx being given to New York County in 1874 and East Bronx given to it in 1895); as such, it was considered "Southern Westchester" for much of its history.

== Notable residents ==
- Mary J.Blige Grammy Award winner R&B singer (Yonkers)
- Kenneth Chenault, CEO of American Express (New Rochelle)
- DMX, Grammy-nominated hip hop artist (Yonkers)
- Kate Douglass, 2020 Tokyo Olympics swimmer (Pelham)
- Jadakiss, rapper (Yonkers)
- M. Farooq Kathwari, chairman & owner of Ethan Allen (New Rochelle)
- Ang Lee, Oscar-winning director (Larchmont)
- Sheek Louch (or simply Sheek), rapper (Yonkers)
- Styles P (also known mononymously as Styles), rapper (Yonkers)
- The Lox, platinum-selling hip hop group composed Jadakiss, Styles P, and Sheek Louch (Yonkers)
- Tyler James Williams, actor and rapper (Yonkers)

== See also ==
- Northern Westchester
