= Osborn–Bouton–Mead House =

Historic house in New York, United States

- U.S. National Register of Historic Places
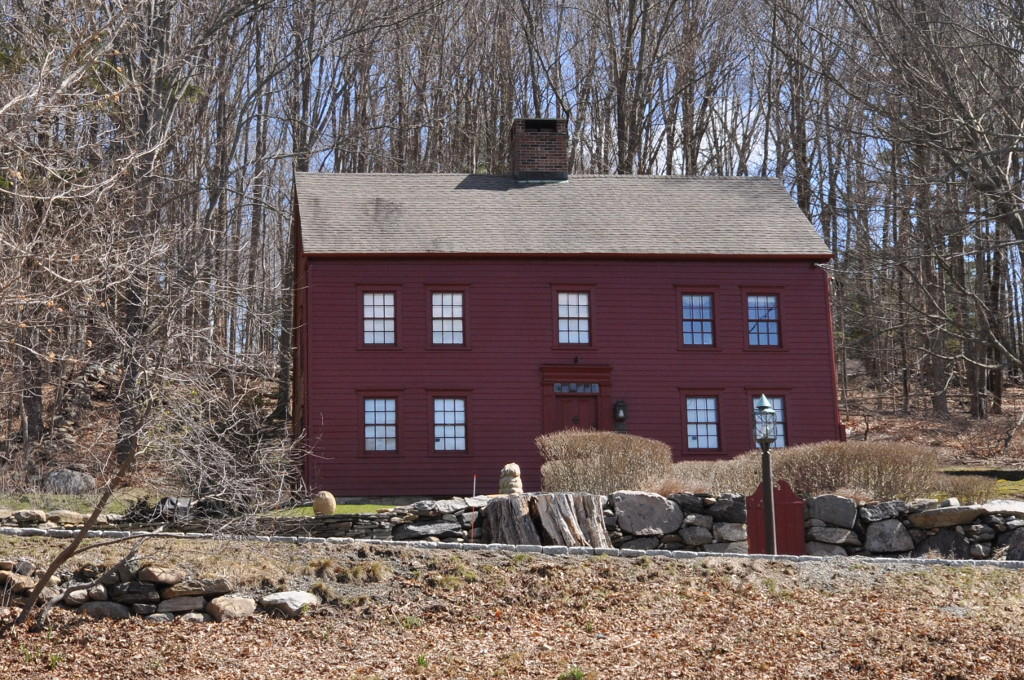

- Location within New York Location within the United States
- Location: 399 Pound Ridge Rd., South Salem, New York
- Coordinates: 41°15′57″N 73°33′59″W
- Area: 2.6 acres (1.1 ha)
- Built: 1734
- Architectural style: Colonial
- NRHP reference No.: 04000990
- Added to NRHP: September 15, 2004

Osborn–Bouton–Mead House is a historic home located at South Salem, Westchester County, New York.

It was added to the National Register of Historic Places in 2004.

== See also ==
- National Register of Historic Places listings in northern Westchester County, New York
