= Truesdale (surname) =

Truesdale is a surname. Notable people with the surname include:

- Amy Truesdale (born 1989), English taekwondo practitioner
- Dave Truesdale (born 1950), American science fiction editor and literary critic
- Donald Leroy Truesdale (1906–1993), American Marine Corps soldier awarded the Medal of Honor
- Frank Truesdale (1884–1943), American baseball player
- Hiram Truesdale (1860–1897), American jurist from Arizona
- John C. Truesdale (1921–2011), American lawyer and civil servant
- Regan Truesdale (born 1963), American basketball player
- William Truesdale (1851–1935), American railroad executive
- William Gene Truesdale (c. 1934–1981), American deputy sheriff murdered by Wilbert Lee Evans
- Yanic Truesdale (born 1970), Canadian actor
