= Hélène Grimaud =

French pianist (born 1969)

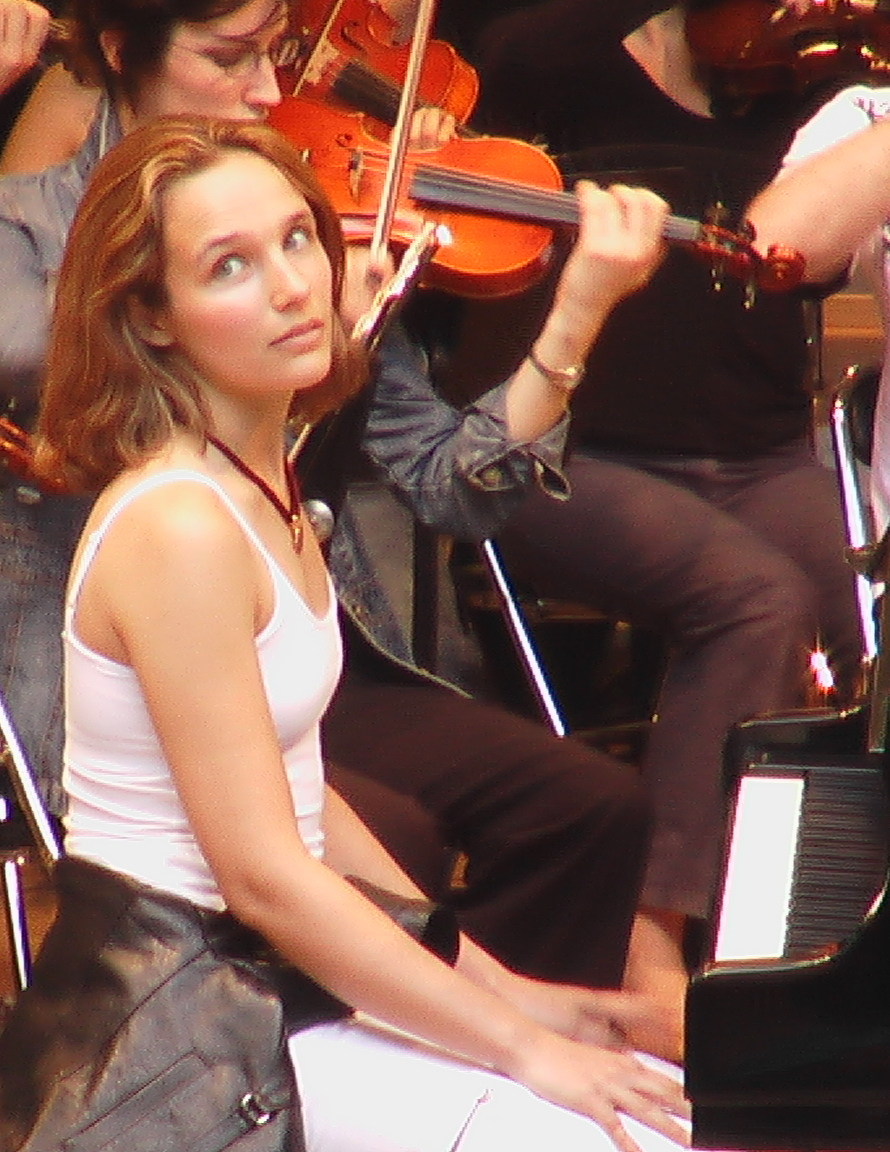
- Grimaud at a rehearsal at La Roque-d'Anthéron Festival, 2004
- Born: Hélène Rose Paule Grimaud; 7 November 1969 (age 57); Aix-en-Provence, France
- Education: Conservatoire de Paris
- Occupation: Classical pianist
- Years active: 1987-present
- Parent(s): Claude Grimaud, Josette (Cirelli) Grimaud
- Website: helenegrimaud.com

Hélène Rose Paule Grimaud (born 7 November 1969) is a French classical pianist and the founder of the Wolf Conservation Center in South Salem, New York.

== Early life and education ==
Grimaud was born in Aix-en-Provence, France, the daughter of teachers Claude and Josette Grimaud (née Cirelli). She described family nationalities in a New York Times interview with John Rockwell: "My father came from a background of Sephardi Jews in Africa, and my mother's ancestors were Jewish Berbers from Corsica." Her father was adopted as a child by a French family, and he became a university tutor teaching languages. According to Luc Antonini the name Grimaud is typical of the region of Trets in Provence. She discovered the piano at seven. In 1982, she entered the Conservatoire de Paris, where she studied with Jacques Rouvier. In 1985, she won 1st Prize at the Conservatory and the Grand Prix du Disque of the Académie Charles Cros for her recording of the Rachmaninoff Piano Sonata No. 2.

She experiences synesthesia, where one physical sense adds to another, in her case seeing music as colour, which helps her with memorising music scores.

== Career ==
Grimaud has been celebrated by her peers as a virtuoso pianist. She has also gained attention for her work as a wildlife conservationist, a human rights activist, and as a writer.

She began her piano studies at the local conservatory with Jacqueline Courtin before going on to work with Pierre Barbizet in Marseille. She was accepted into the Paris Conservatoire at 13 and won first prize in piano performance three years later. She continued to study with György Sándor and Leon Fleisher until, in 1987, she gave a well-received debut recital in Tokyo. That same year, renowned conductor Daniel Barenboim invited her to perform with the Orchestre de Paris.

She debuted in 1995 with the Berliner Philharmoniker under Claudio Abbado and with the New York Philharmonic under Kurt Masur in 1999. It was around this time that Grimaud established the Wolf Conservation Center in South Salem, New York.

Her love for the endangered species was sparked by a chance encounter with a wolf in northern Florida; this led to her determination to open an environmental education centre. "When you look at a wolf in the eye, you establish a connection," Grimaud said. "Hearing about wolves and seeing a wolf are two very different things. It's about accomplishing the goals of outreach — building a bridge of understanding to our counterparts in the wild — and environmental conservation. If you call me an activist, I'm happy." In addition, she is also a member of the organisation Musicians for Human Rights, a worldwide network of musicians and people working in the field of music to promote a culture of human rights and social change.

Grimaud has also published four books that have appeared in various languages. Her first, Variations Sauvages, appeared in 2003. It was followed in 2005 by Leçons particulières, and in 2013 by Retour à Salem, both semi-autobiographical novels. In 2023 she published Renaître.

She tours extensively as a soloist and recitalist. As a chamber musician, she has performed with a wide range of musical collaborators, including Sol Gabetta, Rolando Villazón, Jan Vogler, Truls Mørk, Clemens Hagen, Gidon Kremer, Gil Shaham and the Capuçon brothers. Her contribution to and impact on the world of classical music were recognised by the French government when she was admitted into the Légion d'Honneur at the rank of Chevalier.^{when? source requested}

Grimaud has been an exclusive Deutsche Grammophon artist since 2002. Her recordings have been critically acclaimed and awarded numerous accolades, among them the Cannes Classical Recording of the Year, Choc du Monde de la musique, Diapason d'or, Grand Prix du disque, Record Academy Prize (Tokyo), Midem Classic Award and the Echo Klassik Award.

Her early recordings include Credo and Reflection (both of which feature a number of thematically linked works); a Chopin and Rachmaninov Sonatas disc; a Bartók CD on which she plays the Third Piano Concerto with the London Symphony Orchestra and Pierre Boulez; a Beethoven disc with the Staatskapelle Dresden and Vladimir Jurowski which was chosen as one of history's greatest classical music albums in the iTunes "Classical Essentials" series; a selection of Bach's solo and concerto works, in which she directed the Deutsche Kammerphilharmonie Bremen from the piano; and a DVD release of Rachmaninov's Second Piano Concerto with the Lucerne Festival Orchestra and Claudio Abbado.

In 2010 Grimaud recorded the solo recital album Resonances, showcasing music by Mozart, Berg, Liszt and Bartók. This was followed in 2011 by a disc featuring her readings of Mozart's Piano Concertos Nos. 19 and 23 as well as a collaboration with singer Mojca Erdmann in the same composer's Ch'io mi scordi di te?. Her next release, Duo, recorded with cellist Sol Gabetta, won the 2013 Echo Klassik Award for "chamber recording of the year", and her album of the two Brahms piano concertos, the First recorded with Andris Nelsons and the Bavarian Radio Symphony Orchestra, the Second with Nelsons and the Vienna Philharmonic, appeared in September 2013.

This was followed by Water (January 2016), a live recording of performances from tears become… streams become…, the critically-acclaimed large-scale immersive installation at New York's Park Avenue Armory created by Turner Prize-winning artist Douglas Gordon in collaboration with Grimaud. Water features works by nine composers: Berio, Takemitsu, Fauré, Ravel, Albéniz, Liszt, Janáček, Debussy and Nitin Sawhney, who wrote seven short Water Transitions for the album as well as producing it. April 2017 then saw the release of Perspectives, a two-disc personal selection of highlights from her DG catalogue, including two "encores" – Brahms's Waltz in A flat and Sgambati's arrangement of Gluck's "Dance of the Blessed Spirits" – previously unreleased on CD/via streaming.

Grimaud's next album, Memory, was released in September 2018. Exploring music's ability to bring the past back to life, it comprises a selection of evanescent miniatures by Chopin, Debussy, Satie and Valentin Silvestrov which, in the pianist's own words, "conjure atmospheres of fragile reflection, a mirage of what was – or what could have been".

For her 2020 recording, The Messenger, Grimaud aimed to create a dialogue between Silvestrov and Mozart. She was joined by the Camerata Salzburg in Mozart's Piano Concerto K466 and Silvestrov's Two Dialogues with Postscript and The Messenger – 1996, of which she also performed a solo version. The record was finished with Mozart's Fantasias K397 and K475.

In 2023 Grimaud released Silent Songs, an homage to Valentin Silvestrov. For poetic settings, she was by the young baritone Konstantin Krimmel.

After Silent Songs, she released For Clara, which features Robert Schumann's Kreisleriana paired with music by his protégé, Johannes Brahms. Lieder on the record also feature Konstantin Krimmel.

In 2024, film director David Serero released on Amazon Prime Video his film "Between The Notes" about Hélène Grimaud through a series of personal interviews and archives. The film, featuring Yannick Nézet-Seguin, Bryn Terfel, Alain Duault, Jacques Rouvier and more, was screened in movie theaters. The film was produced in partnership with Deutsche Grammophon and was awarded at several film festivals worldwide.

=== Critical reception ===
Critics have praised Grimaud's willingness to reinterpret works and take chances, and compared her to Glenn Gould:

Grimaud doesn't sound like most pianists: she is a rubato artist, a reinventor of phrasings, a taker of chances. "A wrong note that is played out of élan, you hear it differently than one that is played out of fear," she says. She admires the "more extreme players . . . people who wouldn't be afraid to play their conception to the end." Her two overriding characteristics are independence and drive, and her performances attempt, whenever possible, to shake up conventional pianistic wisdom. Brian Levine, the executive director of the Glenn Gould Foundation, sees in Grimaud a resemblance to Gould: "She has this willingness to take a piece of music apart and free herself from the general body of practice that has grown up around it."

== Personal life ==
In 1991, at age 21, Grimaud moved to Tallahassee, Florida. In 1997, she settled in Westchester County, north of New York City. After some time spent in Berlin, she took up residence in Weggis, near Luzern, Switzerland.

She has a passion for wolves and wolf conservation. She now divides her time between her musical career and the Wolf Conservation Center in South Salem, New York.

Grimaud lives with her partner, the German photographer Mat Hennek, in California and Upstate New York.

== Honours ==
- Ordre des Arts et des Lettres (2002).
- National Order of Merit (France) (16 May 2008).
- Legion of Honour (3 April 2015).

== Discography ==
On Denon

- Rachmaninoff Piano Sonata No. 2, Études-Tableaux, Op. 33 (1986)
- Chopin Ballade No. 1, Liszt Après une Lecture de Dante, Schumann Sonata for Piano (1987)
- Schumann Kreisleriana, Brahms Piano Sonata No. 2 (1989)
- Brahms Piano Sonata No. 3, Klavierstücke (1992)
- Rachmaninoff Piano Concerto No. 2, Ravel Piano Concerto (1993)

On Erato

- Schumann Piano Concerto, Richard Strauss Burleske (1995)
- Brahms Piano Pieces Op. 116–119 (1996)
- Gershwin Piano Concerto, Ravel Piano Concerto in G (1997)
- Brahms Piano Concerto No. 1 (1998)

On Teldec

- Beethoven Piano Concerto No. 4, Piano Sonata No. 30, Piano Sonata No. 31 (1999)
- Rachmaninoff Piano Concerto No. 2, Prelude Op. 32/12, Études-Tableaux Op. 33/1, 2 and 9, Variations on a Theme of Corelli (2001)

On Deutsche Grammophon

- Credo John Corigliano Fantasia on an Ostinato, Beethoven Piano Sonata No. 17 "Tempest", Choral Fantasy, Arvo Pärt Credo (2003)
- Chopin | Rachmaninoff (2005)
- Bartók Piano Concerto No. 3, with Pierre Boulez and the London Symphony Orchestra (2005)
- Reflection Schumann Piano Concerto, Various by Brahms and Clara Schumann (2006)
- Beethoven Piano Concerto No. 5 "Emperor", Piano Sonata No. 28 (2007)
- Bach Various (2008)
- Resonances Mozart: Sonata No. 8, Berg: Sonata op.1, Liszt: Sonata in B minor, Bartok: Romanian Folk Dances (2010)
- Mozart Piano Concerto No. 19, Piano Concerto No. 23, Ch'io mi scordi di te? (with Mojca Erdmann, soprano) (2011)
- Duo (with Sol Gabetta, cello) Works by Schumann, Brahms, Debussy, and Shostakovich (2012)
- Brahms Piano Concertos Nos. 1 & 2 with the Bavarian Radio SO and Vienna PO, conducted by Andris Nelsons (2013)
- Water Various (with Nitin Sawhney) (2016)
- Memory Debussy (including "Clair de Lune"), Satie, Chopin, Silvestrov, Sawhney (2018)
- The Messenger Mozart, Silvestrov with Camerata Salzburg (2020)
- Silent Songs Valentin Silvestrov, with Konstantin Krimmel (2023)
- For Clara Valentin Silvestrov, with Konstantin Krimmel, Schumann Kreisleriana, Op. 16, Brahms 3 Intermezzi, Op. 117, 9 Lieder und Gesänge, Op. 32 (2023)

On Philips

- Schumann Sonata for Violin and Piano in A minor, Op. 105, Gidon Kremer violin and Helene Grimaud piano. Recording date: 7/1989. Release: Lockenhaus Festival 1982–1992 A Decade of Music-Making (1997)

On ACA Digital Recording, Inc

- Bassoon Music Of The Americas, Composers on Bassoon Music Of The Americas: Alvin Etler, Valdir Azevedo, Jose Siqueira, Magda Santos/Pó, Pixinguinha, Heitor Villa-Lobos, Willson Osborne. Jeff Keesecker – bassoon and Hélène Grimaud – piano (2002)

== Bibliography ==
- Variations sauvages (2003, published in English as Wild Harmonies)
- Leçons particulières, Robert Laffont (2005)
- Retour à Salem, Albin Michel (2013)
- Renaître, Albin Michel (2023)

== See also ==
- List of Corsican people

== Notes ==
1. The complete Denon recordings have been released in a box by Brilliant Classics.
