= List of U.S. counties by GDP =

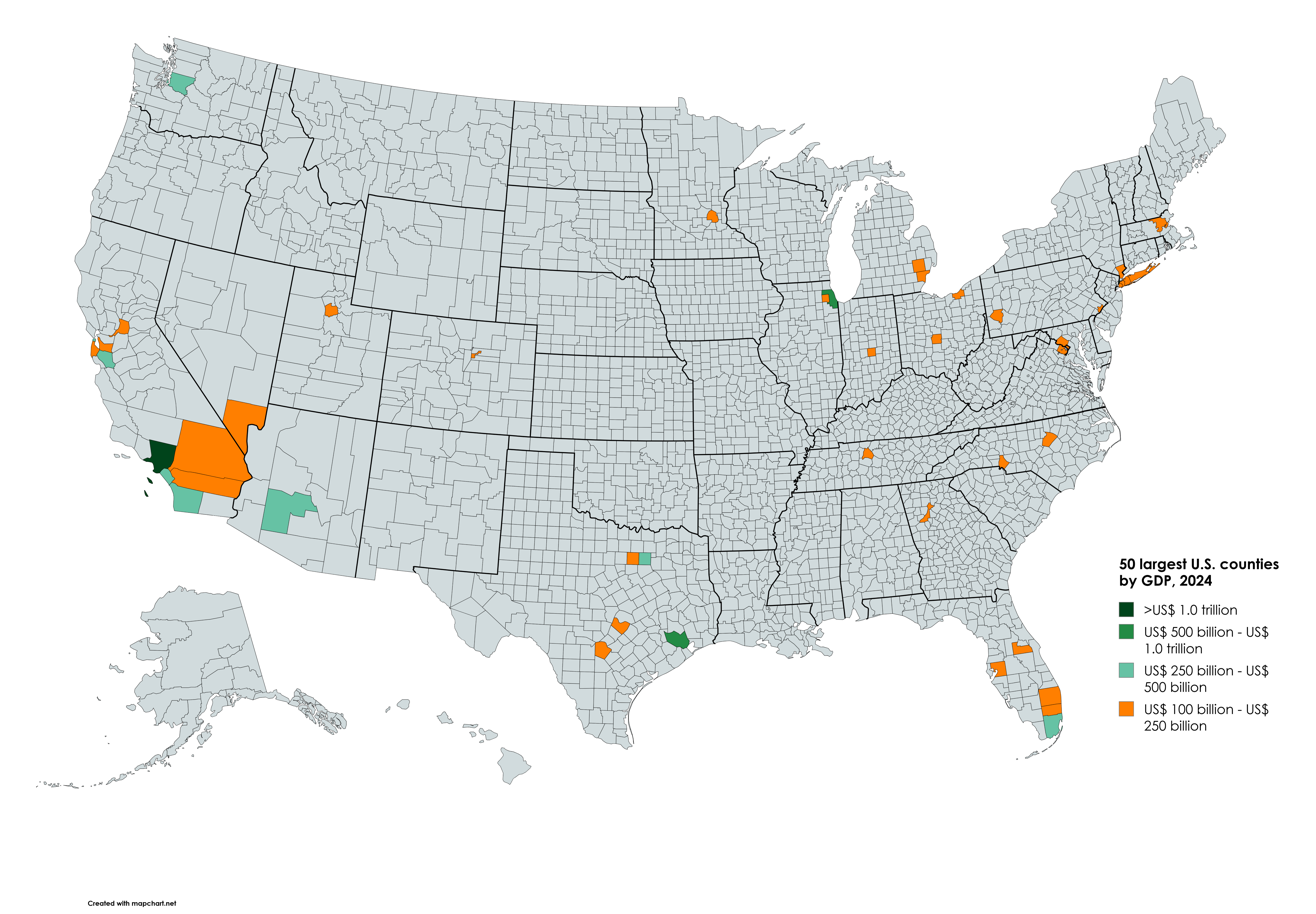
50 largest U.S. counties by GDP, 2024

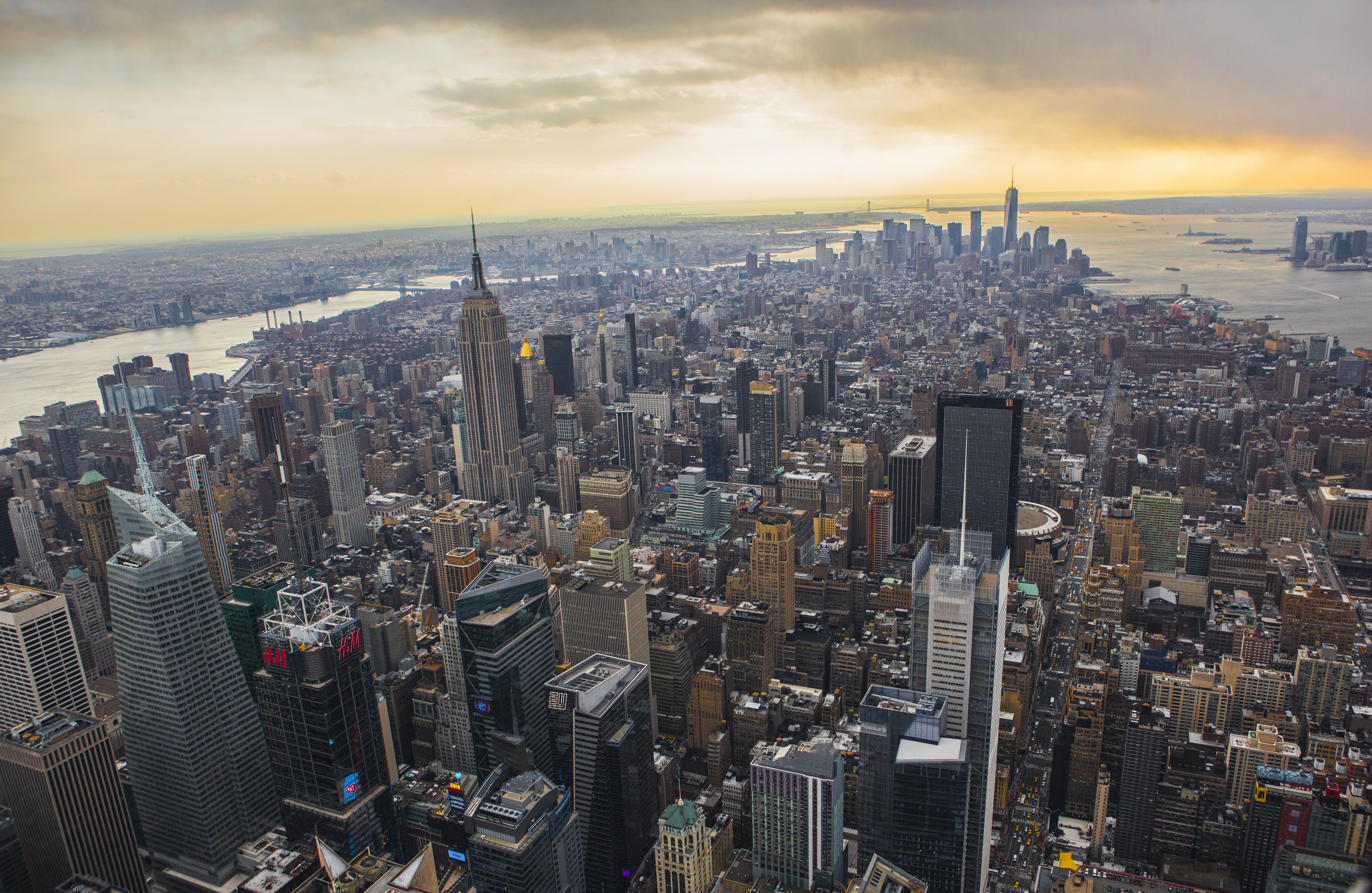
New York county (Manhattan) has the highest GDP (US$1.0 trillion) and GDP per capita (US$606,000) in the U.S.

This is a list of the 50 largest U.S. counties and county equivalents by gross domestic product in US$, representing the year at the top of the column, unless otherwise specified.

== 2024 ==
Rank	County	Largest city	State	GDP (billion, US$)	GDP per capita (US$)^{d}	Population (2024)
1	New York County (Manhattan)	New York^{a}	New York	1,006.673	606,387	1,660,644
2	Los Angeles	Los Angeles	California	1,002.965	102,899	9,757,179
3	Harris	Houston	Texas	592.751	118,330	5,009,302
4	Cook	Chicago	Illinois	546.441	105,437	5,182,617
5	King	Seattle	Washington	477.154	182,285	2,617,631
6	Santa Clara	San Jose	California	438.483	227,627	1,926,325
7	Maricopa	Phoenix	Arizona	419.250	89,716	4,673,096
8	Dallas County, Texas	Dallas	Texas	389.402	146,611	2,656,028
9	Orange	Anaheim	California	351.753	110,948	3,170,435
10	San Diego	San Diego	California	331.868	100,603	3,298,799
11	San Francisco^{b}		California	268.322	324,246	827,526
12	Miami-Dade	Miami	Florida	260.837	91,894	2,838,461
13	Fulton	Atlanta	Georgia	243.563	223,380	1,090,354
14	Middlesex	Cambridge	Massachusetts	240.665	144,201	1,668,956
15	San Mateo	Daly City	California	217.018	292,126	742,893
16	Travis	Austin	Texas	202.653	148,598	1,363,767
17	Clark	Las Vegas	Nevada	195.936	81,678	2,398,871
18	Hennepin	Minneapolis	Minnesota	193.617	152,055	1,273,334
19	Suffolk	Boston	Massachusetts	190.778	240,534	793,144
20	Mecklenburg	Charlotte	North Carolina	186.114	154,287	1,206,285
21	District of Columbia^{c}			184.298	262,439	702,250
22	Alameda	Oakland	California	182.539	110,692	1,649,060
23	Tarrant	Fort Worth	Texas	178.003	79,797	2,230,708
24	Fairfax	Herndon	Virginia	177.534	152,925	1,160,925
25	Broward	Fort Lauderdale	Florida	173.651	85,223	2,037,472
26	Orange	Orlando	Florida	160.400	104,587	1,533,646
27	Bexar	San Antonio	Texas	159.589	75,004	2,127,737
28	Salt Lake	Salt Lake City	Utah	153.846	126,490	1,216,274
29	Hillsborough	Tampa	Florida	152.010	96,122	1,581,426
30	Kings County (Brooklyn)	New York^{a}	New York	145.934	55,750	2,617,631
31	Oakland	Troy	Michigan	143.144	110,375	1,296,888
32	Queens	New York^{a}	New York	143.131	61,779	2,316,841
33	Franklin	Columbus	Ohio	141.972	104,676	1,356,303
34	Palm Beach	West Palm Beach	Florida	140.506	88,812	1,582,055
35	Suffolk	Brookhaven	New York	139.014	90,568	1,535,909
36	San Bernardino	San Bernardino	California	137.914	62,284	2,214,281
37	Cuyahoga	Cleveland	Ohio	135.914	109,556	1,240,594
38	Marion	Indianapolis	Indiana	135.593	138,131	981,628
39	Sacramento	Sacramento	California	135.538	84,121	1,611,231
40	Philadelphia^{b}		Pennsylvania	134.989	85,766	1,573,916
41	Riverside	Riverside	California	134.757	53,265	2,529,933
42	Allegheny	Pittsburgh	Pennsylvania	132.982	107,956	1,231,814
43	Nassau	Hempstead	New York	130.222	93,521	1,392,438
44	Wayne	Detroit	Michigan	129.920	73,357	1,771,063
45	DuPage	Aurora	Illinois	129.734	138,436	937,142
46	Denver^{b}		Colorado	128.544	176,325	729,019
47	Wake	Raleigh	North Carolina	128.428	104,206	1,232,444
48	Westchester	Yonkers	New York	120.154	119,621	1,004,457
49	Montgomery	Germantown	Maryland	117.390	108,466	1,082,273
50	Davidson	Nashville	Tennessee	116.879	160,217	729,505

^aNew York County is coterminous with the Borough of Manhattan, and is part of the City of New York, along with Kings County (Brooklyn), Queens County (Queens), Bronx County (The Bronx), and Richmond County (Staten Island). The figure shown here is for New York County/Manhattan, and does not include the other four boroughs' GDP.

^bDenver, Philadelphia, and San Francisco are consolidated city-counties.

^cThe District of Columbia is a federal district, meaning it is not under any traditional city, county, or state government.

^dGDP divided by county population

^eList of the most populous counties in the United States

== See also ==
- List of U.S. states and territories by GDP
