= Lewisboro, New York =

- Town
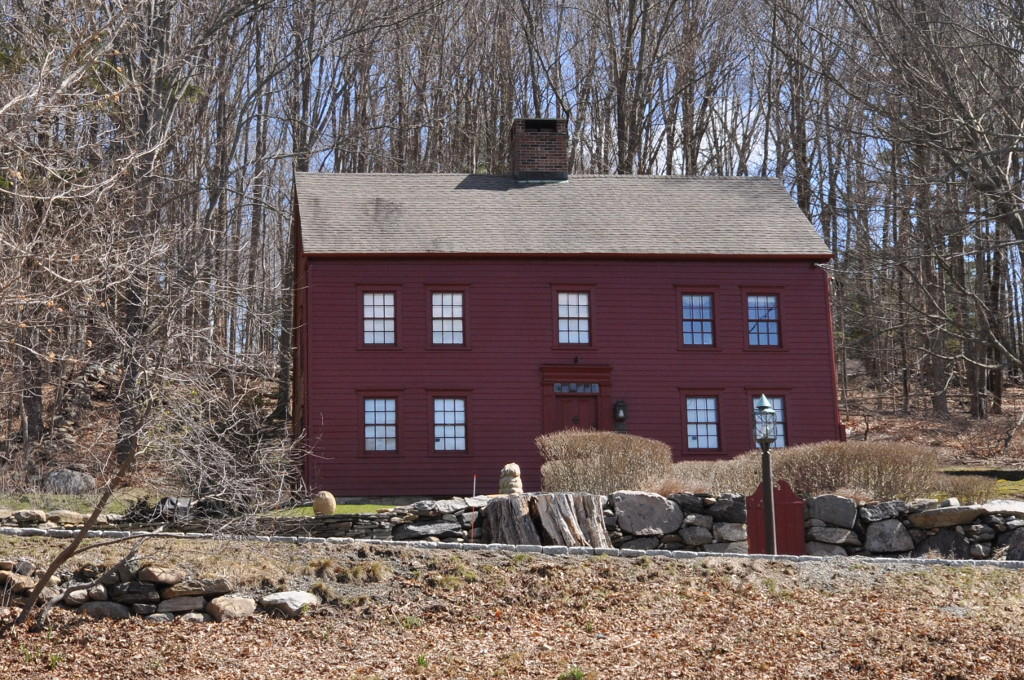
- Osborn–Bouton–Mead House

- Flag

- Location in Westchester County and the state of New York.
- Coordinates: 41°16′1″N 73°35′19″W
- Country: United States
- State: New York
- County: Westchester

Government
  - Type: Manager-Council
  - Town Supervisor: Tony J. Gonçalves (D)
  - Town Board: Members: • Daniel X. Welsh (D); • Richard S. Sklarin (D); • Andrea C. Rendo (R); • Mary E. Shah (D)

Area
  - Total: 29.16 sq mi (75.53 km^{2})
  - Land: 27.75 sq mi (71.86 km^{2})
  - Water: 1.42 sq mi (3.67 km^{2})
- Elevation: 440 ft (134 m)

Population (2020)
  - Total: 12,265
  - Density: 442.1/sq mi (170.7/km^{2})
- Time zone: UTC-5 (Eastern (EST))
  - Summer (DST): UTC-4 (EDT)
- ZIP code: 10590, 10536, 10526, 10597, 10518
- Area code: 914
- FIPS code: 36-42136
- GNIS feature ID: 0979145
- Website: Town Website

Lewisboro is a town in Westchester County, New York, United States. The population was 12,265 at the 2020 census. The town is named after John Lewis, an early settler. Lewisboro is a suburb of New York City.

== History ==
After purchasing land from the local natives, the first settlers established themselves around South Salem. The town was formed as "Salem" in 1747. By 1790 the town assumed its current dimensions as lands were removed for other towns. The name changed to South Salem in 1806. John Lewis, a financier, requested that the town be given his name and established a fund for the town, though he did not follow through on his promise of a railroad link. An abundance of natural open space, Dry-stone walls and elegant Colonial mansions are dominant features.

Lewisboro has had two noteworthy historical characters. Sarah Bishop was the hermit of West Mountain. Apparently mistreated by British soldiers at the time of the Revolutionary War, she retreated to a solitary life in the Lewisboro area. A spot known as "Sarah Bishop's Cave" is on the hill on the north side of Lake Rippowam, near Mountain Lakes Camp. The second historical character appeared around the time of the Civil War. The Leatherman was a wanderer who got his name from homemade leather garments. He is frequently mentioned as being in Lewisboro in the middle of the 19th century. He followed a route past homes that would offer him a meal and reappeared at the same doorsteps for 25 years. One of the hiking destinations in Ward Pound Ridge is to the Leatherman's cave, reportedly one of his more frequent homes. In 1987, a 10k trail race called "The Leatherman's Loop" was started to honor his legacy and continues every spring at the Ward Pound Ridge Reservation.

The Mead Memorial Chapel was listed on the National Register of Historic Places in 1999.

== Geography ==
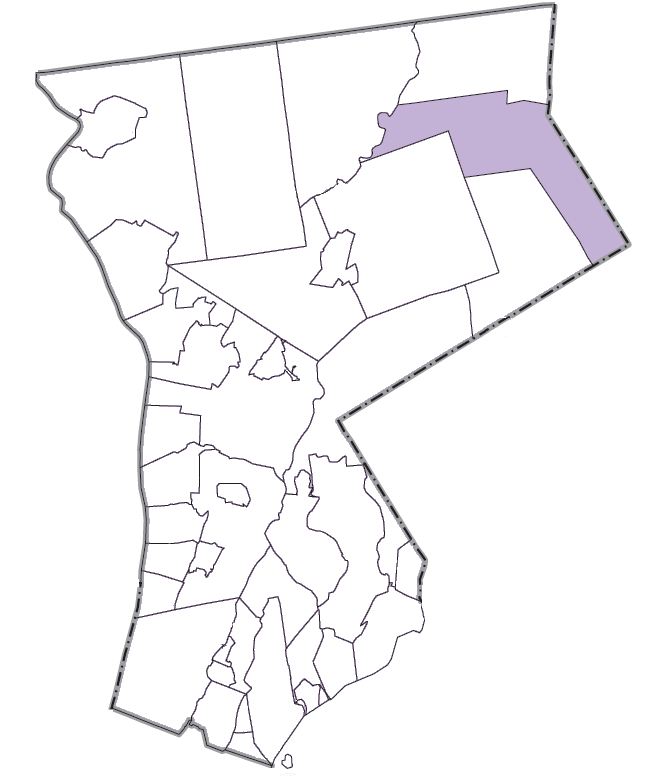
Map of Westchester highlighting Lewisboro

The east town line is the border of Ridgefield, Connecticut and Wilton, Connecticut, while the southern border is the town of New Canaan, Connecticut. Interstate 684 passes near the west side of the town. The town's unusual chevron shape is partly the result of The Oblong, created during the resolution of the boundary dispute between Connecticut and New York.

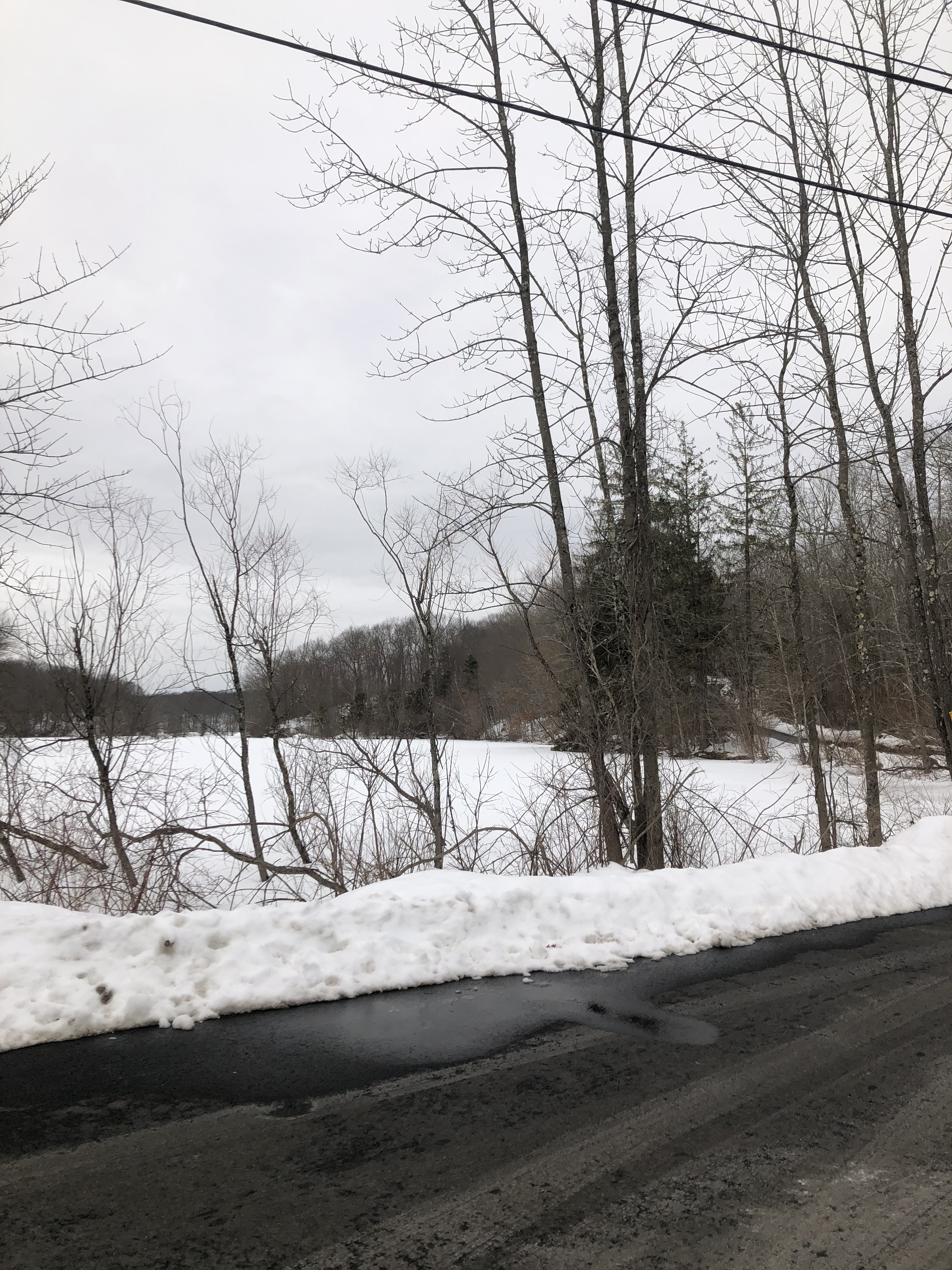
Eastwoods Reservoir in Lewisboro

According to the United States Census Bureau, the town has a total area of 29.1 square miles (75 km^{2}), of which 27.9 square miles (72 km^{2}) is land and 1.3 square miles (3.4 km^{2}), or 4.36%, is water.

== Demographics ==
Historical population
Census	Pop.	Note	%±
1790	1,453		—
1820	1,429		—
1830	1,537		7.6%
1840	1,619		5.3%
1850	1,608		−0.7%
1860	1,885		17.2%
1870	1,601		−15.1%
1880	1,612		0.7%
1890	1,417		−12.1%
1900	1,311		−7.5%
1910	1,127		−14.0%
1920	1,069		−5.1%
1930	1,427		33.5%
1940	1,929		35.2%
1950	2,352		21.9%
1960	4,165		77.1%
1970	6,610		58.7%
1980	8,871		34.2%
1990	11,313		27.5%
2000	12,324		8.9%
2010	12,411		0.7%
2020	12,265		−1.2%
U.S. Decennial Census

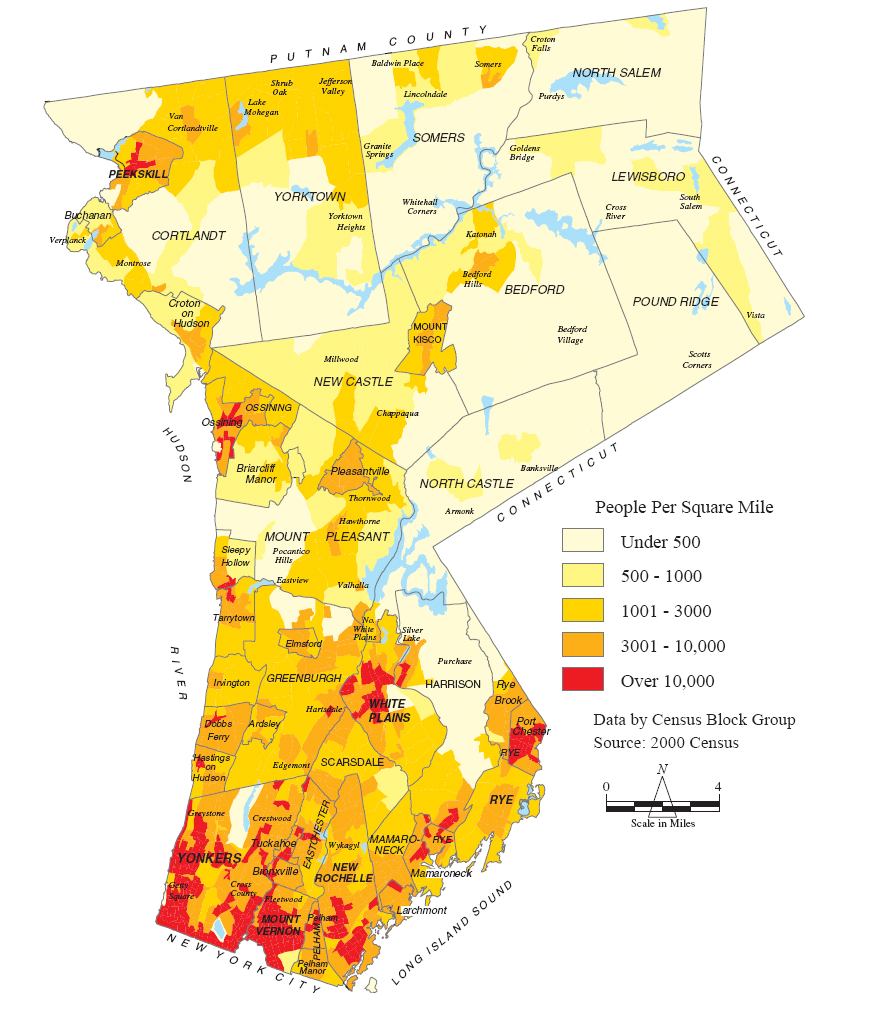
Map of Westchester County showing population density

The census of 2000 counted 12,324 people living in the town, living in 4,218 households, of which 3,425 were families. The population density was 442.5 inhabitants per square mile (170.9/km^{2}). There were 4,465 housing units at an average density of 160.3 units per square mile (61.9 units/km^{2}). The racial makeup of the town was 95.18% White, 1.19% African American, 0.06% Native American, 2.09% Asian, 0.49% from other races, and 0.99% from two or more races. Hispanic or Latino of any race were 2.48% of the population.

There were 4,218 households, of which 47.4% had children under the age of 18 living with them, 72.9% were married couples living together, 6.7% had a female householder with no husband present, and 18.8% were non-families. 15.2% of all households were made up of individuals, and 4.1% had someone living alone who was 65 years of age or older. The average household size was 2.91 and the average family size was 3.26.

In the town, the population was spread out, with 31.6% under the age of 18, 3.8% from 18 to 24, 28.5% from 25 to 44, 29.0% from 45 to 64, and 7.1% who were 65 years of age or older. The median age was 39 years. For every 100 females, there were 95.8 males. For every 100 females age 18 and over, there were 92.3 males.

The median income for a household in the town was $112,462, and the median income for a family was $157,412. Males had a median income of $84,616 versus $48,900 for females. The per capita income for the town was $54,795. About 1.4% of families and 1.9% of the population were below the poverty line, including 1.3% of those under age 18 and 2.7% of those age 65 or over.

== Town life ==
Unlike the neighboring communities of Katonah and Ridgefield, Lewisboro does not have a downtown business district. Most residents in town do their shopping at plazas in Golden's Bridge, Cross River, Vista, or Ridgefield, CT.

== Communities and locations in Lewisboro ==
- Cross River
- Goldens Bridge
- South Salem
- Vista
- Waccabuc

== Parks and preserves ==
Lewisboro is rich in natural areas and is a component of the biotic corridor. Two Westchester County Parks are on Lewisboro's borders, and there are six town parks and several community preserves.

- Ward Pound Ridge Reservation is Westchester County's largest (4,700-acre (19 km^{2})) park. In addition to many trails, there are camping facilities and a Trailside Museum. The main entrance is on Route 121 in Cross River.
- Mountain Lakes Camp is a county park on the northern border of Lewisboro, with beautiful ponds and trails in the forest. The most popular trail leads to "Look Out Point", which is perched on top of a cliff overlooking Lake Waccabuc, Lake Oscaleta and Lake Rippowam.
- Onatru Farm on Elmwood Road is one of Lewisboro's preëminent parks and includes tennis facilities and playing fields as well as some town offices. This area also includes some walking trails.
- The Lewisboro Town Park on Route 35 contains tennis courts, the town pool, ball fields, and outdoor basketball courts. When ice skating is available in winter, a sign is posted. There are also some walking trails in this park that connect to the adjacent Ward Pound Ridge Reservation. From the late 1960s to early 1980s there was a ski tow with two beginner trails, funded and given to the town by the local Lion's Club.
- The Leon Levy Preserve was acquired by the town in 2006 as open space. While some trails exist in this 370-acre (1.5 km^{2}) parcel, as of 2008 additional horse and hiking trails are under development and parking is still limited.
- The Brownell Preserve is 118 acres (0.48 km^{2}) of forested land given to the town. It has a 2-mile (3.2 km) trail that loops past an overlook of Lake Katonah.
- The Old Field Preserve was obtained in 2003, and contains about 100 acres (0.40 km^{2}) of woods, wetlands, and sizable old fields (thus, the name). The meadows will be preserved to support the birds and animals that are dependent upon this increasingly rare habitat.
- Fox Valley Park has a variety of sports facilities for the town, including very busy soccer fields, ball fields, and tennis courts.

== Lakes and reservoirs ==
There are 7 lakes in the town of Lewisboro. Lake Waccabuc, Lake Oscaleta, and Lake Rippowam are interconnected and are collectively known as the Three Lakes, and are natural (not man-made) lakes. Lake Waccabuc is the largest and most well-known of these, and the area of town named after it has a separate post office. Lake Oscaleta and Lake Rippowam are also called the Twin Lakes, probably because of Twin Lakes Village, a development which runs between them. The other lakes in town are Lake Truesdale, Lake Katonah, Lake Kitchawan, and Timber Lake. Recognizing the importance of the lake communities in the town, in 2007 a Lakes Committee was formed by the Town of Lewisboro.

Additionally, there are a number of reservoirs in the town of Lewisboro, utilized by cities such as Norwalk, Connecticut.

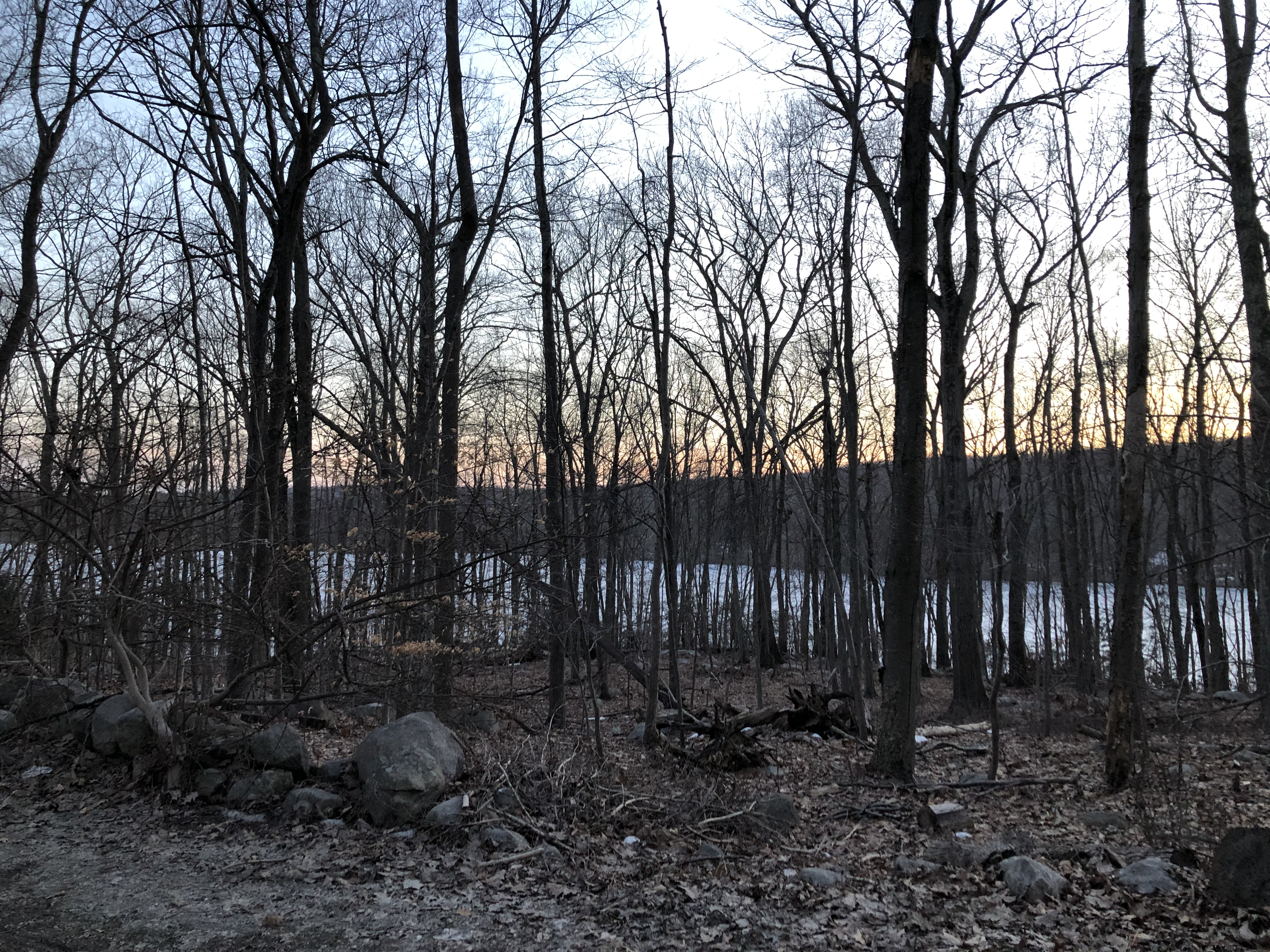
Browns Reservoir seen from Silver Spring Road in the hamlet of Vista

== Schools in Lewisboro ==
The public schools in Lewisboro are part of the Katonah-Lewisboro School District. John Jay High School, located in Cross River, is the only high school in the Katonah-Lewisboro School District. It has been ranked as one of the top 200 high-schools in the nation by Newsweek magazine. John Jay Middle School is also in Cross River on the same campus as John Jay High School.

== Transportation ==
Lewisboro is crossed by New York State Route 123, which is a continuation of the Connecticut state route of the same name. The road runs through Lewisboro until intersecting with New York State Route 35. Housatonic Area Regional Transit (HART) operates a weekday commuter shuttle between Katonah station and the South Salem Municipal park and ride lot at 606 Old Post Rd.

== Notable people ==
A list of notable Waccabuc residents can be found on the hamlet's page.

- John Callahan, Wisconsin Superintendent of Public Instruction
- Richard B. Handler, Chairman & CEO Jeffries
- Robert Castelli, State Assemblyman
- Andy Milonakis, comedian
- Chris Jasper, musician, composer, member of the Isley Brothers
- Roger Stone (b. 1952), Republican Party strategist and pollster
- Jeffrey Tambor, actor
- Stanley Tucci, actor
- Henry A. Wallace, Vice President - 1941–1945, Secretary of Agriculture - 1933–1940
