= New Canaan (CDP), Connecticut =

Census-designated place in Connecticut, United States

New Canaan, Connecticut
- Census-designated place
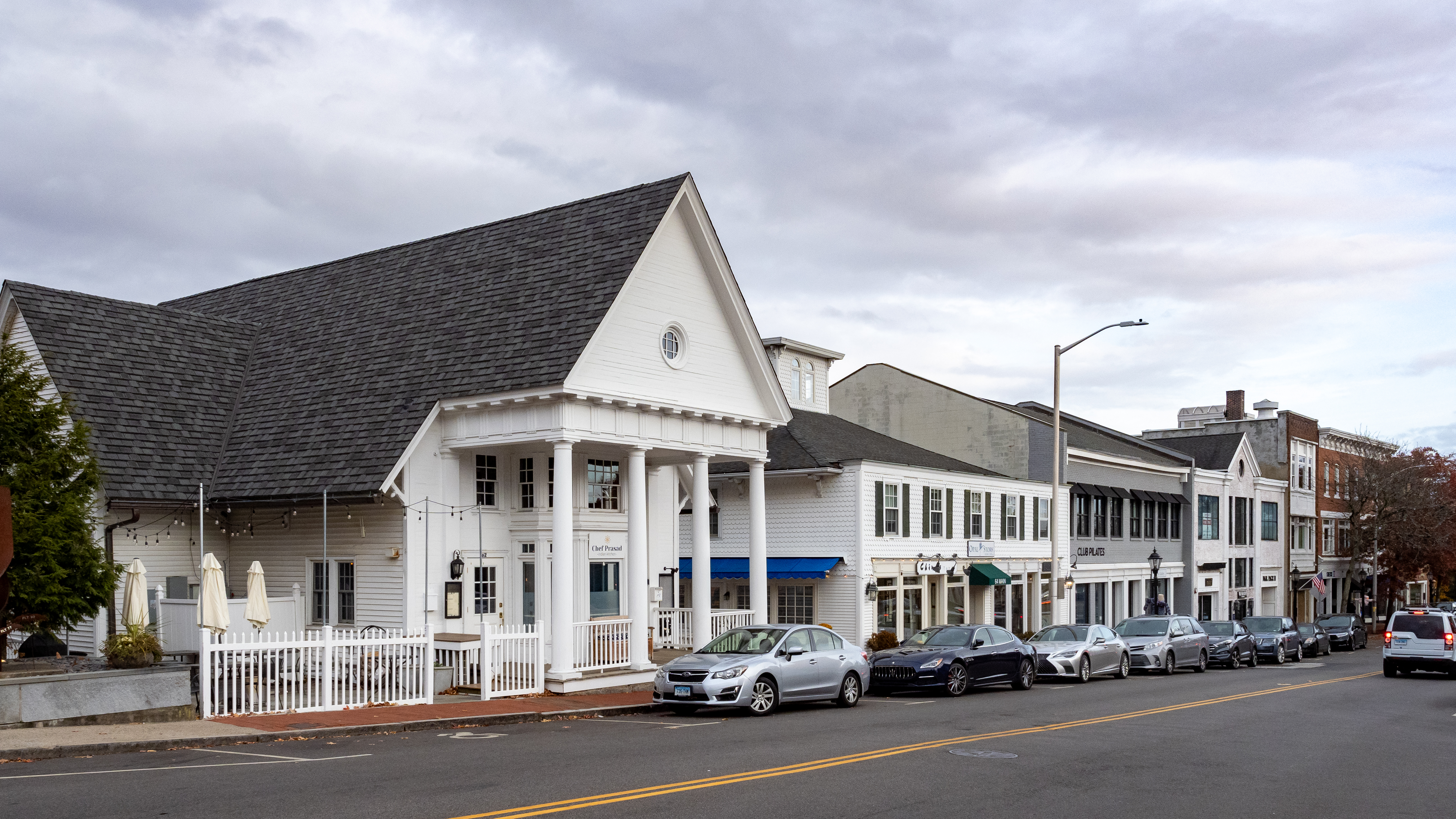
- Downtown New Canaan (2024)

- Location within Connecticut Location within the United States
- Coordinates: 41°8′47″N 73°29′41″W
- Country: United States
- State: Connecticut
- County: Fairfield
- Town: New Canaan

Area
  - Total: 1.56 sq mi (4.03 km^{2})
  - Land: 1.55 sq mi (4.01 km^{2})
  - Water: 0.0039 sq mi (0.01 km^{2})
- Elevation: 302 ft (92 m)
- Time zone: UTC-5 (Eastern (EST))
  - Summer (DST): UTC-4 (EDT)
- ZIP Code: 06840
- Area codes: 203/475
- FIPS code: 09-50576
- GNIS feature ID: 2805958

New Canaan is a census-designated place (CDP) in the town of New Canaan, Fairfield County, Connecticut, United States. It represents the built-up center of town around the intersections of Main Street, East Street, Elm Street, and South Avenue. It was first listed as a CDP prior to the 2020 census.
