= South Salem, New York =

- hamlet
- Location within New York
- Coordinates: 41°16′20″N 73°33′10″W
- Country: United States
- State: New York
- County: Westchester
- Town: Lewisboro
- Elevation: 541 ft (165 m)
- Time zone: UTC-5 (Eastern (EST))
  - Summer (DST): UTC-4 (EDT)
- Area code: 914
- GNIS feature ID: 965860

South Salem is a hamlet in the Town of Lewisboro, Westchester County, in the U.S. state of New York. Part of the New York metropolitan area, the town center has a post office, town hall, library, and recycling center.

Notable residents have included the 33rd Vice President of the United States Henry A. Wallace, Major John Andre (British spy held captive), Rolling Stones guitarist Keith Richards, photographer O. Winston Link, artist Charles Sheeler (American, 1883–1965), pianist Hélène Grimaud, composer and arranger Clare Grundman, singer and musical stage headliner Sally Ann Howes, actress Colleen Dewhurst, bond salesman Joseph Schembri, musician Chris Jasper, and notorious real estate scion and convicted murderer Robert Durst.

The Osborn–Bouton–Mead House was added to the National Register of Historic Places in 2004.

== Education ==
Katonah–Lewisboro School District serves South Salem.

Meadow Pond Elementary School is in South Salem.
