= Vista, New York =

Coordinates: 41.202318°N 73.5101236°W

Vista is a hamlet located within the town of Lewisboro, New York, United States, on the border with New Canaan and Wilton, Connecticut. Vista contains a small commercial center home to multiple stores and restaurants. Vista is one of six hamlets within the town of Lewisboro. Vista is also served by its own volunteer fire department.

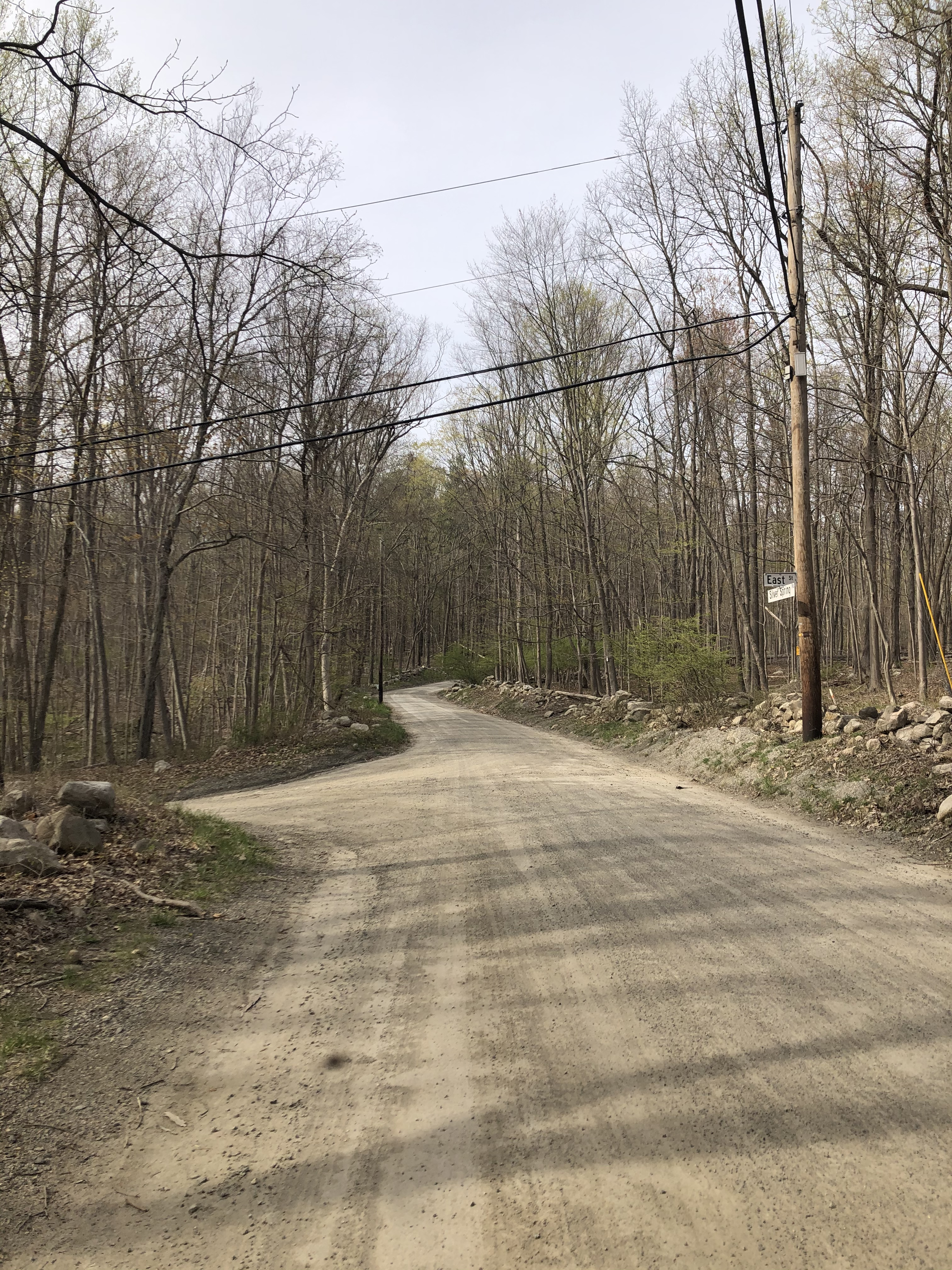
Dirt road in Vista
