= Westchester =

Westchester most commonly refers to Westchester County, New York, immediately north of New York City.

It may also refer to:

== Geography ==
=== Canada ===
- Westchester Station, Nova Scotia, Canada

=== United States ===
- Town of Westchester, the original seat of Westchester County and now called Westchester Square, Bronx, in New York City
- Westchester Creek, an inlet of the East River formerly a running creek that traversed Westchester Square
- Westchester, Connecticut
- Westchester, Florida
- Westchester, Illinois
- Westchester, Indiana
- Westchester, Los Angeles, California
- Westchester Township, Porter County, Indiana

== Other uses ==
- Westchester Magazine, covering Westchester County
- Black Westchester Magazine, African-American magazine in Westchester County
- The Westchester, a shopping mall in White Plains, Westchester County
- Westchester Films, see Shout Factory

== See also ==
- Westchester Stakes (disambiguation)
- West Chester (disambiguation)
