= Lake Shenorock =

Lake in Somers, New York

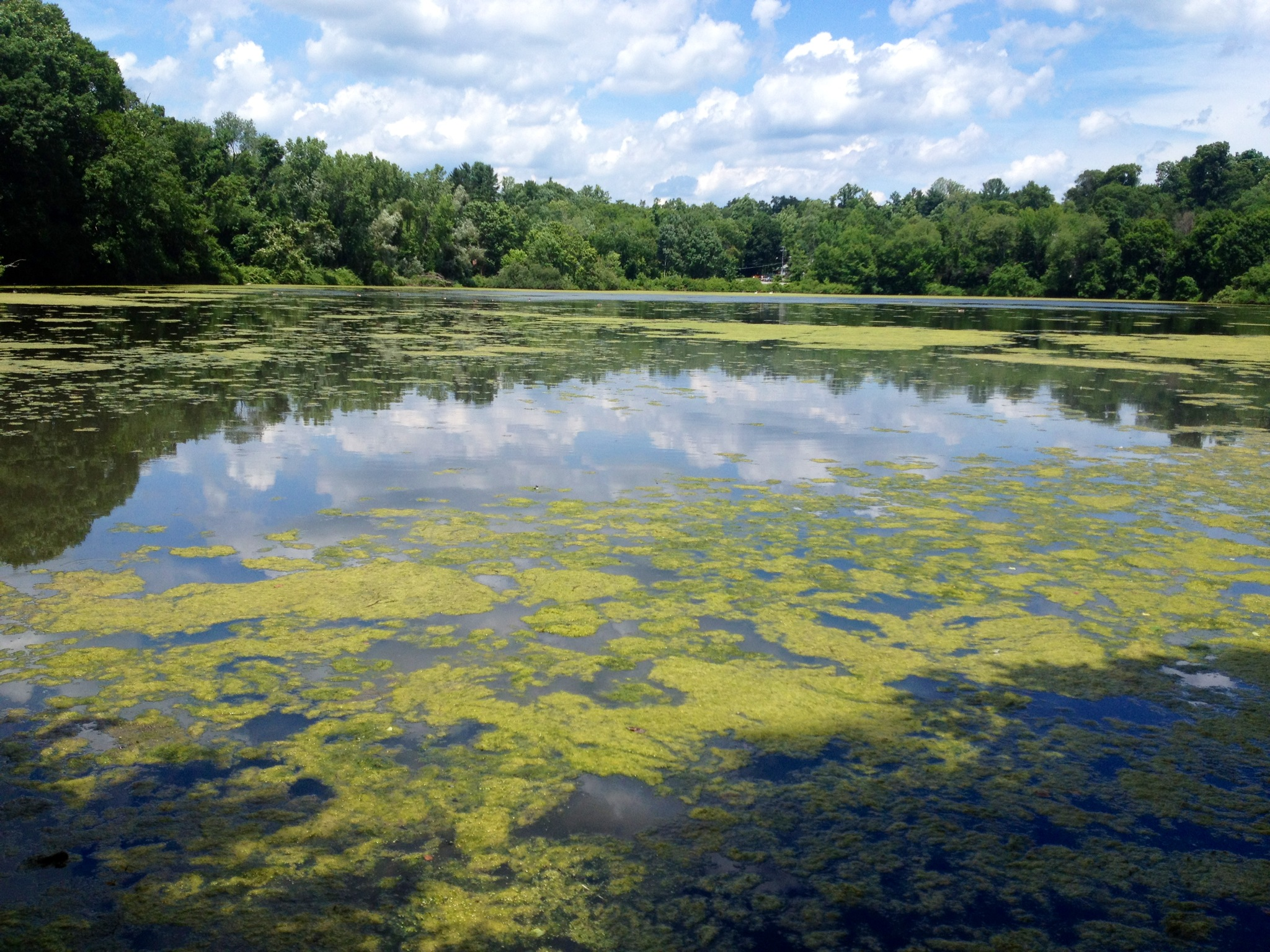
- View of Lake Shenorock from "Bass Rock" (July 2013)

- Location within New York
- Location: Westchester County, New York
- Coordinates: 41°19′41″N 73°44′25″W
- Type: lake
- Basin countries: United States
- Surface area: 13 acres (5.2 ha)
- Average depth: 3 ft 7 in (1.1 m)
- Max. depth: 7 ft 7 in (2.3 m)
- Surface elevation: 456 ft (139 m)

Lake Shenorock is a class B lake located in the hamlet of Shenorock in the town of Somers, New York. It was used for fishing and recreational swimming until the Clean Water Act was passed in 1972 and the lake became a source of drinking water, ending swimming in 1977. The outfall of the lake drains into the Amawalk Reservoir, a part of the New York City water supply system. There are no major tributaries to the lake.

Like the hamlet, the lake is named after Shawanórõckquot, a Wiechquaeskeck sachem of the Wappinger people.

== Geography ==
Lake Shenorock town is located at 41°19′55″N 73°44′22″W (41.331850, -73.739323) with the lake southeast of the town centre. Lake Shenorock is located north of the Amawalk Reservoir.

- Basin: Lower Hudson River
- Size: 5.2 hectares (13 acres)
- Lake Origins: Augmented by Dam
- Watershed Area: 400 hectares (990 acres)
- Mean Depth: 1.1 metres (3 ft 7 in)
- Sounding Depth: 2.3 metres (7 ft 7 in)

== Use ==
Lake Shenorock shore

Lake Shenorock, a tributary to the Amawalk Reservoir, once supported two beaches, which were closed in 1977 following the Clean Water Act of 1972 as the lake is a backup drinking water supply for the Amawalk and Shenorock water district.

The lake is in a significant eutrophic state of high levels of algal growth, low levels of oxygen, and poor water transparency due to the run off of fertilizers that contain chemicals such as phosphorus. As a result, the lake is undergoing the natural process of transitioning into a swamp.

The United Owners Association of Shenorock, submitted a proposal to the Somers Town Board to create a Park District where recreational swimming would be able to return to the lake following renditions such as dredging and installment of aeration devices.

== Outflow ==
Lake Shenorock has no named tributaries, but water released from it flows into the Amawalk Reservoir. Water released from the Amawalk flows south in the Muscoot River and eventually enters the Muscoot Reservoir, which flows into the New Croton Reservoir. Water there either enters the New Croton Aqueduct to travel to the Jerome Park Reservoir in the Bronx, where it is distributed to the Bronx and to northern Manhattan, or flows over the spillway back into the river and ultimately drains into the Hudson River at Croton Point.

On average, the New Croton Aqueduct delivers 10% of New York City's drinking water.
