= West Chester station =

West Chester station may refer to:

- West Chester station (West Chester Railroad), a West Chester Railroad train station in West Chester, Pennsylvania, USA
- West Chester Transit Center, a bus terminal and parking garage in West Chester, Pennsylvania, USA
- Westchester Station, a community in Nova Scotia, Canada
- West Chester University station, a former railroad station in West Chester, Pennsylvania, USA
- Westchester/Veterans station, a light rail station in Inglewood, California, USA

== See also ==
- West Chester (disambiguation)
- Westchester (disambiguation)
