= Nick Gargiulo =

American football player (born 2000)

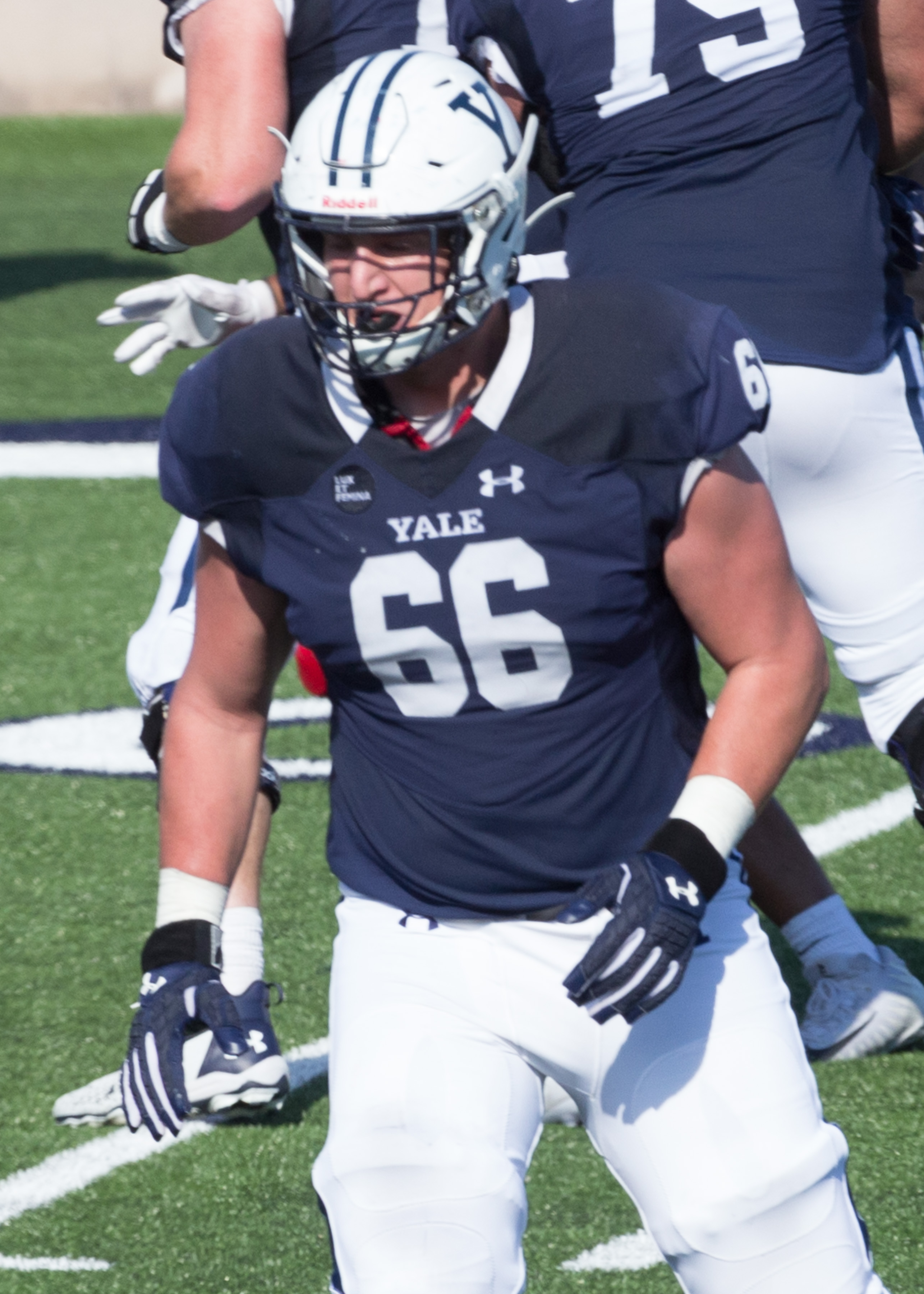
- Gargiulo with the Yale Bulldogs in 2019

No. 66 – Denver Broncos
- Position: Guard
- Roster status: Physically unable to perform

Personal information
- Born: July 19, 2000 (age 26); Yorktown Heights, New York, U.S.
- Listed height: 6 ft 5 in (1.96 m)
- Listed weight: 310 lb (141 kg)

Career information
- High school: Somers (Lincolndale, New York)
- College: Yale (2018–2022); South Carolina (2023)
- NFL draft: 2024: 7th round, 256th overall pick

Career history
- Denver Broncos (2024–present)

Awards and highlights
- First-team All-Ivy League (2022)

Career NFL statistics as of Week 7, 2026
- Games played: 1
- Games started: 1
- Stats at Pro Football Reference

Nicholas J. Gargiulo (/ɡɑːrˈdʒuːloʊ/ gar-JOO-loh; born July 19, 2000) is an American professional football guard for the Denver Broncos of the National Football League (NFL). He played college football for the Yale Bulldogs and South Carolina Gamecocks and was selected by the Denver Broncos in the seventh round of the 2024 NFL draft.

== Early life ==
Gargiulo was born on July 19, 2000, in Yorktown Heights, New York. He first played football in third grade and later was a standout at Somers High School, where he was a two-way lineman and also played basketball. At Somers, he won a starting job as a sophomore and helped them win the state championship the next year, being named All-League and All-Section. He received All-State honors as a senior and was chosen the league's most valuable player. He was named to the state's Super 11 and Golden Dozen teams but was a zero-star recruit for college, ultimately committing to play for the FCS Yale Bulldogs.

== College career ==
Gargiulo redshirted his freshman year at Yale in 2018, playing one game, and then won the starting job at left tackle in the 2019 season. He started all 10 games in the 2019 season, and then missed the 2020 season as it was canceled due to the COVID-19 pandemic. He broke his fibula and right ankle early on in the 2021 season and missed the rest of the year. He then returned for the 2022 season and was selected team captain, ultimately winning first-team All-Ivy League honors as well as being selected All-New England by the New England Football Writers Association.

Gargiulo opted to play a final season of college football in 2023 and transferred to the South Carolina Gamecocks. He started all 12 games in his lone year with the Gamecocks, the first five at left guard before shifting to center for the rest of the year. Gargiulo was the team captain for South Carolina and received third-team All-Southeastern Conference (SEC) honors at the end of the year. He finished his collegiate career having started 36 games, totaling 17 at center, 14 at left tackle and five at left guard. He played at the 2024 Hula Bowl and was invited to the NFL Scouting Combine.

== Professional career ==
Pre-draft measurables
Height	Weight	Arm length	Hand span	Wingspan	40-yard dash	10-yard split	20-yard split	20-yard shuttle	Three-cone drill	Vertical jump	Broad jump	Bench press
6 ft 5 3/8 in (1.97 m)	318 lb (144 kg)	33 7/8 in (0.86 m)	10 3/8 in (0.26 m)	6 ft 9 1/4 in (2.06 m)	5.25 s	1.78 s	3.00 s	4.65 s	7.33 s	32.5 in (0.83 m)	8 ft 5 in (2.57 m)	28 reps
All values from NFL Scouting Combine/Pro Day

Gargiulo was selected by the Denver Broncos in the seventh round of the 2024 NFL draft with the second-to-last pick (256th overall), becoming the first athlete from Somers High School ever to be drafted by an NFL team.

On August 27, 2024, Gargiulo was waived by the Broncos during their final roster cuts. The next day, he was re-signed to the practice squad. He signed a reserve/future contract on January 13, 2025.

After suffering a major injury to his ACL during Week 2 of the 2025 preseason, Gargiulo was placed on season-ending injured reserve on August 17.

On July 26, 2026, Gargiulo was placed on the active/physically unable to perform list prior to training camp while rehabbing from the injury he suffered the previous year. He then reverted to the reserve/PUP list to start the season.
