= Somers High School (New York) =

Coordinates: 41°18′43″N 73°42′54″W

Location
- 120 Primrose Street; Lincolndale, New York 10540; United States

Information
- Type: Public high school
- Established: 1962
- Oversight: Somers Central School District
- Principal: Pete Rodrigues
- Asst. Principals: Brian Carroll, Tara Kearns
- Teaching staff: 91.25 (on an FTE basis)
- Grades: 9-12
- Enrollment: 910 (2023–2024)
- Student to teacher ratio: 9.97
- Colors: Red, white and black
- Mascot: Tusker
- Rival: Yorktown High School
- Newspaper: Tusker Times
- Website: shs.somersschools.org

Somers High School is a public high school in Lincolndale, New York, United States.

== Academics ==
Somers High School offers a New York State regents curriculum augmented by Advanced Placement courses and a variety of electives. The school has local chapters of the National Honor Society and National Foreign Language Honor Society.

For the 2006–2007 school year, Somers had a graduation rate of 100%, with 97% receiving a regents diploma and 61% receiving a regents diploma with advanced designation. Of graduating students 77% enrolled in a four-year college, 18% enrolled in a two-year college, 5% became employed full-time, and fewer than 1% joined the military.

In 2008 Alexander Saeboe won second place in the team competition at the prestigious Siemens Competition in Math, Science & Technology.

== Athletics ==
Somers High School's mascot is an elephant, and teams' nickname is the Tuskers, both in honor of the town being known for hosting the first American circus.

=== Baseball ===
The baseball team had won league titles in 1972, 2000, and 2001. In 2007 the team won the Class A title. The team followed up with another Sectional title in 2008. In 2009 they won the Section 1 Class A crown.

In 2007, Rob Sanzillo, a Somers High School graduate (class of 2003), was drafted by the St. Louis Cardinals.

=== Football ===
==== Tony DeMatteo Era (2000-2020) ====
Despite being a respected program throughout the 20th century, Somers had never won a Section championship. That drought ended in 2000 with the hiring of longtime head coach Tony DeMatteo, who previously led Roosevelt High School (Yonkers, New York), to a Class AA State Championship in 1996. In his first season, DeMatteo guided Somers to its first-ever Section title. That team also featured sophomore Anthony DeMatteo, who would later join the program's coaching staff.

Somers waited 12 years for its next Section championship, which came in 2012 with a 42-13 home victory over Sleepy Hollow High School in a season impacted by Hurricane Sandy. The program quickly built on that success, capturing another title in 2013 by defeating undefeated Rye High School 20-7, avenging a regular-season loss. During that season, DeMatteo surpassed the 300-win milestone in his head coaching career.

Although Somers had consistent success in Section 1 play, it struggled to carry that momentum into the state playoffs. That changed in 2016. The team began its postseason run by defeating previously unbeaten Yorktown High School—who had beaten Somers earlier that season—42-6 in the Section championship. Somers then defeated Cornwall High School 28-7 in the regional round, avenging losses from the 2012 and 2013 playoffs and securing the program’s first Regional title.

Somers advanced to its first state championship game at the Carrier Dome at Syracuse University, where it faced undefeated Greece Athena High School. In a competitive matchup, Somers won 25-17 to claim its first state football championship. The season also marked the first time a Somers player earned New York State Player of the Year honors, as senior wide receiver Matt Pires—who went on to play at the University of Rhode Island—received the award. The roster also included Nick Gargiulo, a future captain at Yale and South Carolina and a 2024 NFL Draft pick by the Denver Broncos.

Somers added its fifth Section championship in the shortened 2020 season, defeating John Jay Cross River High School 17-14 on the road. Due to the COVID-19 pandemic, no state playoffs were held that year.

DeMatteo retired following the conclusion of the 2020 season, citing a desire to spend more time with his family. He finished with the most victories of any head coach in Section 1 history and ranked second all-time in wins among New York State high school football coaches. He was also recognized by the NFL for his motivational impact on high school football. His successor was his son and assistant coach, Anthony DeMatteo.

==== Anthony DeMatteo Era (2021-present) ====
In the first year under head coach Anthony DeMatteo, Somers won its sixth Section championship, defeating Rye High School 26-23. It was the program's first Section title since 2016. Somers then defeated Burnt Hills-Ballston Lake High School 48-14 to capture its second Regional championship. Due to efforts to avoid a bye in the state playoffs, Rye received an at-large berth. As a result, Somers and Rye met again three weeks later, this time with a trip to the state championship game at stake. In a closely contested game, Somers prevailed 14-7 to advance to its second state championship appearance. In the state final, Somers faced Christian Brothers Academy of Syracuse, New York at the JMA Wireless Dome at Syracuse University. Despite a valiant effort, Somers was defeated 32-31.

=== Ice hockey ===
The Somers ice hockey team is merged with that of North Salem High School. In the 2007–08 season, Somers/North Salem had their winningest season in either school's history by finishing 16-9-1 and winning their first-ever sectional game against rival JFK/Putnam Valley.

=== Lacrosse ===
The boys' lacrosse team went to eight sectional title games from 2000 to 2010, winning in 2000, 2001, 2002, 2003, 2006, and 2009. The team was also defeated in the NY State semifinals in 2000–2002 and 2006 and in the state title game in 2003.

Since 2002, nine Tuskers have earned All-American honors.

By year: 2003, 2004, 2005, 2006, 2007, 2008, 2009, 2010, 2011, 2012, 2013, 2014, 2015, 2016.

In 2009, the Tuskers went to their last sectional championship.

=== Soccer ===
The girls' soccer team has won five sectional titles, and reached the NY State Class A State Semi-Finals in 2006 and 2011. They won the Class A New York State Public High School Athletic Association State Championship in 2014. The boys' soccer team won the Section 1 title in 1998 and finished the season ranked fifth in New York State. In 2016, they won the State Championships.

=== Track and field ===
The school's only track state championship came in cross country in 2004. The cross country team also won the sectional title in 2005, 2007, and 2016. The indoor track and field team won the section championship in 1984, 1998, 1999, 2001, 2005–2008, and 2010.

=== Wrestling ===
Somers won its first state championship in 2009 in the 103 pound weight class, and won another state championship in 2011 in the 135 lb weight class.

== Controversy ==
In 2022, Somers School District Superintendent Dr. Raymond Blanch removed an English teacher from the classroom mid-lesson after students' parents reported being upset at the content she presented as part of an optional activity on racial identity using excerpts from Me and White Supremacy by Layla Saad. On November 10, 2022, the Somers Central School District issued a letter from Blanch in which he admitted, "The English Department was not specifically prohibited from using this text after it had been removed from the summer reading list in June 2021."

== Notable alumni ==
- Nick Gargiulo, NFL player for the Denver Broncos
- Andrew Yang, candidate in the 2020 Democratic Party presidential primaries and 2021 New York City Democratic mayoral primary
