= Shawanórõckquot =

Wiechquaeskeck sachem

Shawanórõckquot (fl. 1636–1666), also referred to as Janorocket, Shenarock or Shenarockwell, and Sauwenare or Sawenaroque, was a Wiechquaeskeck sachem who negotiated land sales in Westchester County between 1636 and 1666, including the Pell Indian Deed with Thomas Pell. There are many written variations of his name due to different phonetic representations.

Shawanórõckquot was a leader in Kieft's War against the Dutch in the 1640s. In the 1660s, Shawanórõckquot was imprisoned by the Dutch at Fort Amsterdam. He was released after local chiefs refused to negotiate with Dutch officials until he was freed.

== Legacy ==
Lake Shenorock and Shenorock, New York, are named for him.
