= New Jersey Monthly =

American monthly magazine

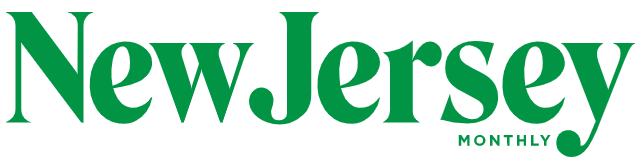

- Cover of the October 2015 issue
- Categories: Regional magazine
- Frequency: Monthly
- Total circulation: 91,381 (December 2011)
- Founded: 1976
- Company: Aylesworth Communications Corp.
- Country: United States
- Based in: Morristown, New Jersey
- Language: English
- Website: njmonthly.com
- ISSN: 0273-270X

New Jersey Monthly is an American monthly magazine featuring issues of possible interest to residents of New Jersey. The magazine was started in 1976. It is based in Morristown. In addition to articles of general interest, the publication features occasional special subject issues covering and ranking high schools, lawyers, doctors and municipalities. It is a member of the City and Regional Magazine Association (CRMA).
