= Milton Harbor (Long Island Sound) =

Bay in Westchester County, New York, United States

- Location within New York
- Location: Rye, New York
- Coordinates: 40.9483°N 73.6965°W
- Islands: none

Milton Harbor is the name of a bay located in the city of Rye on Long Island Sound, in Westchester County, New York. Historical names for the harbor include Apwonnah and Mill Creek

Milton Harbor's tidal wetlands and marshlands are home to a variety of plants and animals, especially birds, which come to feed, breed and build nests.
