= Heritage Hills, New York =

- Census-designated place
- Seal Logo

- Location of Heritage Hills, New York
- Coordinates: 41°20′18″N 73°41′50″W
- Country: United States
- State: New York
- County: Westchester
- Town: Somers

Area
  - Total: 1.90 sq mi (4.93 km^{2})
  - Land: 1.88 sq mi (4.86 km^{2})
  - Water: 0.027 sq mi (0.07 km^{2})
- Elevation: 587 ft (179 m)

Population (2020)
  - Total: 4,511
  - Density: 2,404.6/sq mi (928.44/km^{2})
- Time zone: UTC-5 (Eastern (EST))
  - Summer (DST): UTC-4 (EDT)
- FIPS code: 36-34118
- GNIS feature ID: 1852901
- Website: heritagehills.com

Heritage Hills is a hamlet (and census-designated place) within the town of Somers in Westchester County, New York, United States. As of the 2020 census, Heritage Hills had a population of 4,511.

== Geography ==
Heritage Hills is located at 41°20′18″N 73°41′50″W.

According to the United States Census Bureau, the CDP has a total area of 1.9 square miles (4.9 km^{2}), of which 1.9 square miles (4.8 km^{2}) is land and 0.039 square miles (0.1 km^{2}), or 2.03%, is water.

== Demographics ==
Historical population
Census	Pop.	Note	%±
2020	4,511		—
U.S. Decennial Census

=== 2020 census ===
As of the 2020 census, Heritage Hills had a population of 4,511. The median age was 71.7 years. 5.3% of residents were under the age of 18 and 64.2% of residents were 65 years of age or older. For every 100 females there were 62.2 males, and for every 100 females age 18 and over there were 60.6 males age 18 and over.

100.0% of residents lived in urban areas, while 0.0% lived in rural areas.

There were 2,811 households in Heritage Hills, of which 9.6% had children under the age of 18 living in them. Of all households, 40.1% were married-couple households, 11.7% were households with a male householder and no spouse or partner present, and 45.9% were households with a female householder and no spouse or partner present. About 47.6% of all households were made up of individuals and 39.5% had someone living alone who was 65 years of age or older.

There were 3,115 housing units, of which 9.8% were vacant. The homeowner vacancy rate was 2.6% and the rental vacancy rate was 5.8%.

Racial composition as of the 2020 census
Race	Number	Percent
White	4,179	92.6%
Black or African American	37	0.8%
American Indian and Alaska Native	2	0.0%
Asian	95	2.1%
Native Hawaiian and Other Pacific Islander	0	0.0%
Some other race	40	0.9%
Two or more races	158	3.5%
Hispanic or Latino (of any race)	178	3.9%

=== 2000 census ===
As of the 2000 census, there were 3,683 people, 2,119 households, and 1,146 families residing in the CDP. The population density was 1,591.0 inhabitants per square mile (614.3/km^{2}). There were 2,290 housing units at an average density of 989.2 per square mile (381.9/km^{2}). The racial makeup of the CDP was 96.99% White, 0.87% African American, 0.03% Native American, 1.47% Asian, 0.08% from other races, and 0.57% from two or more races. Hispanic or Latino of any race were 1.09% of the population.

There were 2,119 households, out of which 5.1% had children under the age of 18 living with them, 49.6% were married couples living together, 3.6% had a female householder with no husband present, and 45.9% were non-families. 43.0% of all households were made up of individuals, and 30.0% had someone living alone who was 65 years of age or older. The average household size was 1.72 and the average family size was 2.25.

In the CDP, the population was spread out, with 5.3% under the age of 18, 1.3% from 18 to 24, 11.7% from 25 to 44, 27.1% from 45 to 64, and 54.7% who were 65 years of age or older. The median age was 67 years. For every 100 females, there were 69.0 males. For every 100 females age 18 and over, there were 67.9 males.

The median income for a household in the CDP was $63,450, and the median income for a family was $90,904. Males had a median income of $89,866 versus $48,598 for females. The per capita income for the CDP was $46,523. About 0.6% of families and 3.3% of the population were below the poverty line, including none of those under age 18 and 2.5% of those age 65 or over.

=== Community history ===
Originally, at least one member of each household had to be at least 40 years old, with no one under 18 allowed to live in the development.

== Education ==
Somers Central School District is the area school district.
