= West Chester =

West Chester may refer to some places in the United States:

- West Chester, Iowa
- West Chester (Des Moines, Iowa), a historic house known as the Chamberlain Mansion
- West Chester, Tuscarawas County, Ohio
- West Chester Township, Ohio
- Olde West Chester, Ohio
- West Chester, Pennsylvania
  - West Chester University, Pennsylvania

== See also ==
- West Chester station (disambiguation), stations of the name
- Westchester (disambiguation)
