= Hudson Valley (magazine) =

Monthly magazine covering the Hudson Valley, New York, United States

- April 2010 issue of Hudson Valley
- Editor: Linda Fears
- Categories: Regional
- Frequency: Monthly
- Circulation: 150,000
- Publisher: Today Media
- First issue: 1971
- Country: United States
- Language: English
- Website: hvmag.com
- ISSN: 0191-9288

Hudson Valley is a regional-interest monthly magazine that covers the Hudson Valley. It began publishing in April, 1972, and works out of offices in Poughkeepsie, approximately in the center of its coverage area (Albany, Rensselaer, Columbia, Dutchess, Greene, Orange, Putnam, Rockland, Ulster and Westchester counties).

Articles in Hudson Valley are features and lifestyle pieces about residents, places, history, recreation, and dining opportunities in the region. They are accompanied by color photography and a lengthy event listing.

The magazine is a member of the City and Regional Magazine Association (CRMA).
