= Somers Central School District =

School district serving Somers, New York

Address
- 250 US-202, Somers, NY 10589 Somers, New York, 10589; United States
- Coordinates: 41.3260148°N 73.6944589°W

District information
- Grades: PK-12
- Superintendent: Adam Bronstein
- Schools: 4
- Budget: $106,228,824 (2023-24)
- NCES District ID: 3627180

Students and staff
- Students: 2,557 (2023-24)
- Teachers: 257.17 (FTE)
- Student–teacher ratio: 9.94

Other information
- Website: www.somersschools.org

The Somers Central School District is a school district headquartered in Somers, New York.

The district includes most of Somers town, and it has the census-designated places of Heritage Hills, Lincolndale, and Shenorock.

== History ==
The Somers Central School District was formally established in 1952 through the centralization of smaller local school districts in the town of Somers. Prior to this, education in Somers was provided by small, community-based schools, often one-room schoolhouses, typical of rural 19th- and early 20th-century New York. These schools served the agricultural community’s children under separate local boards. The push for centralization in the mid-20th century was part of a statewide movement in New York to consolidate smaller districts, improving educational standards, resource allocation, and administrative efficiency.

The district’s growth reflects Somers’ population increase and suburban development. In the 1950s–1960s, expanded rapidly, with schools like Primrose Elementary opening in 1956 . By the 1970s–1980s, the district added Somers Intermediate and Somers Middle School, serving around 2,500 students. The 1990s–2000s saw a peak enrollment of approximately 3,200, followed by stabilization in the 2010s–2020s at around 2,600–3,000 students, with 2,557 reported in 2023–2024 (NCES District Detail).

Today, SCSD operates four schools. Primrose Elementary, Somers Intermediate, Somers Middle, and Somers High School. Two teenagers in 2016 were charged with vandalizing 40 district school buses that amounted to $29,000. The school district was forced to close schools for a day due to all the slashed tires, shattered windows, and used fire extinguishers.

=== Controversies ===
In 2022, there was controversy in the school district over how racism should be addressed as part of classroom instruction. The superintendent ordered a teacher to halt a segment about racism after some parents sent communications arguing against the lesson.

=== Statistics over time ===
Currently, the Somers Central School District operates on a large budget totaling $106,228,824 for the 2023-2024 school year.

2018-2025 Data
Year	Proposed Budget ($)	Budget ±%	Votes In Support	Votes Against	Budget Pass or Fail (Support %)*	# of Enrolled Students
24-25	110,810,731	4.31	1,902	774	Pass (71.1)	N/A
23-24	106,228,824	5.20	2,126	1,322	Pass (61.7)	Not Released Yet
22-23	100,982,930	3.59	1,049	495	Pass (67.9)	2,600**
21-22	97,483,143	2.98	1,266	357	Pass (78.0)	2,709
20-21	94,658,222	1.05	3,126	1,080	Pass (74.3)	2,781
19-20	93,677,220	2.65	870	303	Pass (74.2)	2,862
18-19	91,257,500	3.31	751	220	Pass (77.3)	2,948

*Public School Districts in New York State need 60% of voters to support a budget in order for it to pass

**School Budget for 2023-2024 listed the Enrollment in 2022-2023 as 2,649. However, the New York State Department of Education has the number as 2,600.

== Schools ==
- Somers High School (9-12)
- Somers Middle School (6-8)
- Somers Intermediate School (3-5)
- Primrose Elementary School (K-2)
