= City and Regional Magazine Association =

American nonprofit organization

- City and Regional Magazine Association logo
- Abbreviation: CRMA
- Founded: 1978
- Type: 501(c)(7) nonprofit organization
- Tax ID no.: 22-2269813
- Location: Redondo Beach, California, U.S.
- Revenue: $748,193 (2014)
- Expenses: $655,943 (2014)
- Employees: 0 (2014)
- Volunteers: 2 (2014)
- Website: www.citymag.org

The City and Regional Magazine Association (CRMA) is an American nonprofit organization founded in 1978 that facilitates professional development and training for member magazines and methods for exchanging information and ideas.

== Activities ==
The Association organizes activities to encourage editorial and journalistic standards, and compile industry research and data for its members. CRMA also represents member magazines on major national and regional public policy issues. The organization's membership comprises publications from the United States, Canada and Mexico. Each year, the organization provides awards for excellence to qualified member organizations in designated categories. The awards are managed on CRMA’s behalf by the University of Missouri School of Journalism.

== Members ==
The Association's members are primarily publications focused on general interest topics covering a local or regional area and distributed through the mail or through newsstand sales. Members must have, or be in the process of completing, circulation audits.

Existing members include:

- 5280 (Denver, Colorado)
- Atlanta (Atlanta, Georgia)
- Baltimore (Baltimore, Maryland)
- Boston (Boston, Massachusetts)
- Chicago (Chicago, Illinois)
- Cincinnati Magazine (Cincinnati, Ohio)
- Cleveland Magazine (Cleveland, Ohio)
- Columbus Monthly (Columbus, Ohio)
- D Magazine (Dallas-Fort Worth, Texas)
- Honolulu (Honolulu, Hawaii)
- Hour Detroit (Detroit, Michigan)
- Houstonia (Houston, Texas)
- Hudson Valley (Hudson Valley, New York)
- Indianapolis Monthly (Indianapolis, Indiana)
- Los Angeles (Los Angeles, California)
- Milwaukee Magazine (Milwaukee, Wisconsin)
- Mpls.St.Paul Magazine (Minneapolis, Minnesota)
- New Hampshire (New Hampshire)
- New Jersey Monthly (New Jersey)
- Orange Coast (Orange County, California)
- Our State (North Carolina)
- Philadelphia (Philadelphia, Pennsylvania)
- Pittsburgh Magazine (Pittsburgh, Pennsylvania)
- Portland Monthly (Portland, Oregon)
- Rhode Island Monthly (Rhode Island)
- Sactown Magazine (Sacramento, California)
- San Diego Magazine (San Diego, California)
- St. Louis Magazine (St. Louis, Missouri)
- Texas Monthly (Texas)
- Washingtonian Magazine (Washington, DC)
- Westchester Magazine (Westchester County, New York)
- Yankee (New England)

== Services ==
Services offered by CRMA to its members include:

- Financial standards and performance surveys with customized comparisons
- An advertising sales network allowing members to market their advertising in multiple markets
- Email lists serving each of the major departments of their member's publications which allows colleagues to remain in contact
- A national conference for staff organized based on departments and tasks which generally spans 3 days and provides educational sessions on operations and an exhibit show for vendors
- Two publishers roundtable meetings each year where management topics and concerns are discussed by executive level participants
