= The Hudson Independent =

- Type: Monthly newspaper
- Format: Print Newspaper (monthly) and Website (updated daily)
- Owner: The Hudson Valley News Corporation
- Publisher: The Hudson Valley News Corporation
- Editor: Rick Pezzullo
- Founded: 2006
- Political alignment: Independent
- City: P.O. Box 336 Irvington, New York, 10533
- Circulation: 19,090
- Website: TheHudsonIndependent.com

The Hudson Independent is a monthly newspaper serving the Westchester communities of Tarrytown, Sleepy Hollow, Irvington, Dobbs Ferry, Ardsley-on-Hudson, Pocantico Hills, and Scarborough-on-Hudson. It is published by The Hudson Valley News Corporation and distributed to every home and business in the villages as well as subscribers outside the region.

== Mission ==
The paper strives to serve its readers by providing a variety of information and reporting without bias. Their audience is considered a diverse mix of people and organizations, and The Hudson Independent wishes to be attentive to all members of the communities. Whether they want to find out what's developing with the issues that affect their daily lives, what's happening in the schools, where to dine or shop, or a calendar of events for the month, The Hudson Independent attempts to provide all this kind of information.

The name of the newspaper is key—it is an independent and vigilant watchdog of the village governments and institutions without political partiality or spin. Editorials may express an opinion but the news will not.

The paper serves as a sounding board for all local residents, and welcomes any and all viewpoints in letters to the editor and in guest columns. The objective is to have as broad a public participation as possible.

== History ==
The paper launched in February 2006 and in 2015 it published its February 10 issue, marking the beginning of its tenth year of publication. The paper was started in response to a gap in objective news coverage within the Villages.

The paper which originally served Tarrytown and Sleepy Hollow now also serves the neighboring villages of Irvington and Dobbs Ferry.

== Awards ==
The New York Press Association in its “2006 Better Newspaper Contest” awarded The Hudson Independent third place for its education coverage written mainly by Andrea Kott. The award was presented at the organization's annual convention, attended by more than 300 newspapers, in Saratoga Springs. “From cafeteria fare to testing practices, good story telling is a key component of the paper,” the NYPA explained in presenting the award.

On November 12, 2008 Bob Kimmel the chairman of the editorial board and the newspaper were both honored by the Rotary Club as "Person of the Year" and "Organization of the Year" in recognition of the paper and Bob's contributions to the community. Bob and the newspaper were congratulated by all three villages, the Tarrytown school district, and Tarrytown Mayor Drew Fixell.

The newspaper, in 2014, earned the Laurance S. Rockefeller from the Family YMCA at Tarrytown for its community Service. The award was presented to the Founders and Board of the newspaper "...for their significant and lasting contributions to the Y and other community-based organizations that serve children and families; and for the paper's being a leader in the issues of public health, recreation, land preservation and ecology, areas of special concern to Mr. Rockefeller throughout his lifetime."
