= Westchester Magazine =

Local interest magazine

- 2010 issue of Best Of
- Editor: John Bruno Turiano
- Categories: Regional
- Frequency: Monthly
- Circulation: 67,000
- Publisher: Sam Wender
- Paid circulation: 47,000
- First issue: 2001
- Company: Today Media
- Country: United States
- Based in: Rye, NY
- Language: English
- Website: http://www.westchestermagazine.com
- ISSN: 1542-3409

Westchester Magazine, launched in 2001, is a magazine and website that covers news, culture, lifestyle, nightlife, shopping, and other local information within Westchester County, New York. It is published monthly by Today Media, LLC, a company located in Rye, NY. In 2023, its paid circulation was 47,000. Their annual sales are estimated to be between $5 and $10 million, and they have between 50 and 100 employees. It is a member of the City and Regional Magazine Association (CRMA).

The magazine publishes the "Best of Westchester" where it rates shops and restaurants in various categories. The magazine hosts an annual event and party called ‘Best of Westchester’ which highlights many of the winners of that year's issue. The website gives a breakdown of restaurants, nightlife, shopping & styles, and neighborhoods.

== Staff ==
- Angelo R. Martinelli - Chairman of the Board of Today Media, LLC
- Ralph A. Martinelli - Publisher & President Today Media, LLCC
- John Bruno Turiano - Editor

== See also ==
- Hudson Valley (magazine)
- New York (magazine)
- The New Yorker
- The New-York Magazine
- Black Westchester
