= Rhode Island Monthly =

Monthly magazine

- Categories: Regional magazine
- Frequency: Monthly
- Founder: Daniel J. Kaplan and Konrad L. Schultz
- Founded: 1987
- First issue: April 1988
- Company: Rhode Island Monthly Communications
- Country: USA
- Based in: Pawtucket, Rhode Island
- Language: English
- Website: www.rimonthly.com
- ISSN: 1041-1380
- OCLC: 18499849

Rhode Island Monthly is a glossy monthly magazine about life in Rhode Island and Southeastern Massachusetts.

== History and profile ==
Rhode Island Monthly was founded in 1987 by Daniel J. Kaplan and Konrad L. Schultz. The first issue was published in April 1988. From 1990 to 1992, Rhode Island Island Monthly was owned by Communications International, the parent of Connecticut magazine; it was then sold back to its founders. In 1997, the magazine was acquired by The Providence Journal. In 2009, it was sold to its publisher, John J. Palumbo. It is a member of the City and Regional Magazine Association (CRMA). The editorial offices are located in Pawtucket.

== Best of Rhode Island ==
The "Best of Rhode Island" is a group of awards given by Rhode Island Magazine in an annual issue. These awards are akin to the "Best of Boston" but are not nearly as numerous.

The awards are given in a wide range of categories that vary from year-to-year ad hoc. Recent awards include best restaurants, best local band, best hiking trail, best bars to people watch, best ice cream places, and best vintage store.

== Rhode Island Red Awards ==
A recent addition to the magazine, these now-yearly awards recognize "the weirdest, dumbest, most outrageous" moments of the preceding year.

== Ancillary publications ==
Rhode Island Monthly produces several ancillary publications:

- Engaged in Southern New England is an annual publication for wedding planners and brides-to-be.
- Your Ultimate Summer Guide is an annual publication targeting local residents and out-of-state visitors.
- Welcome to Rhode Island Newcomers' Guide is everything locals should know about the Ocean State.
- Nest is a guide to home construction, renovation and interior design.
