= Shenorock, New York =

- CDP
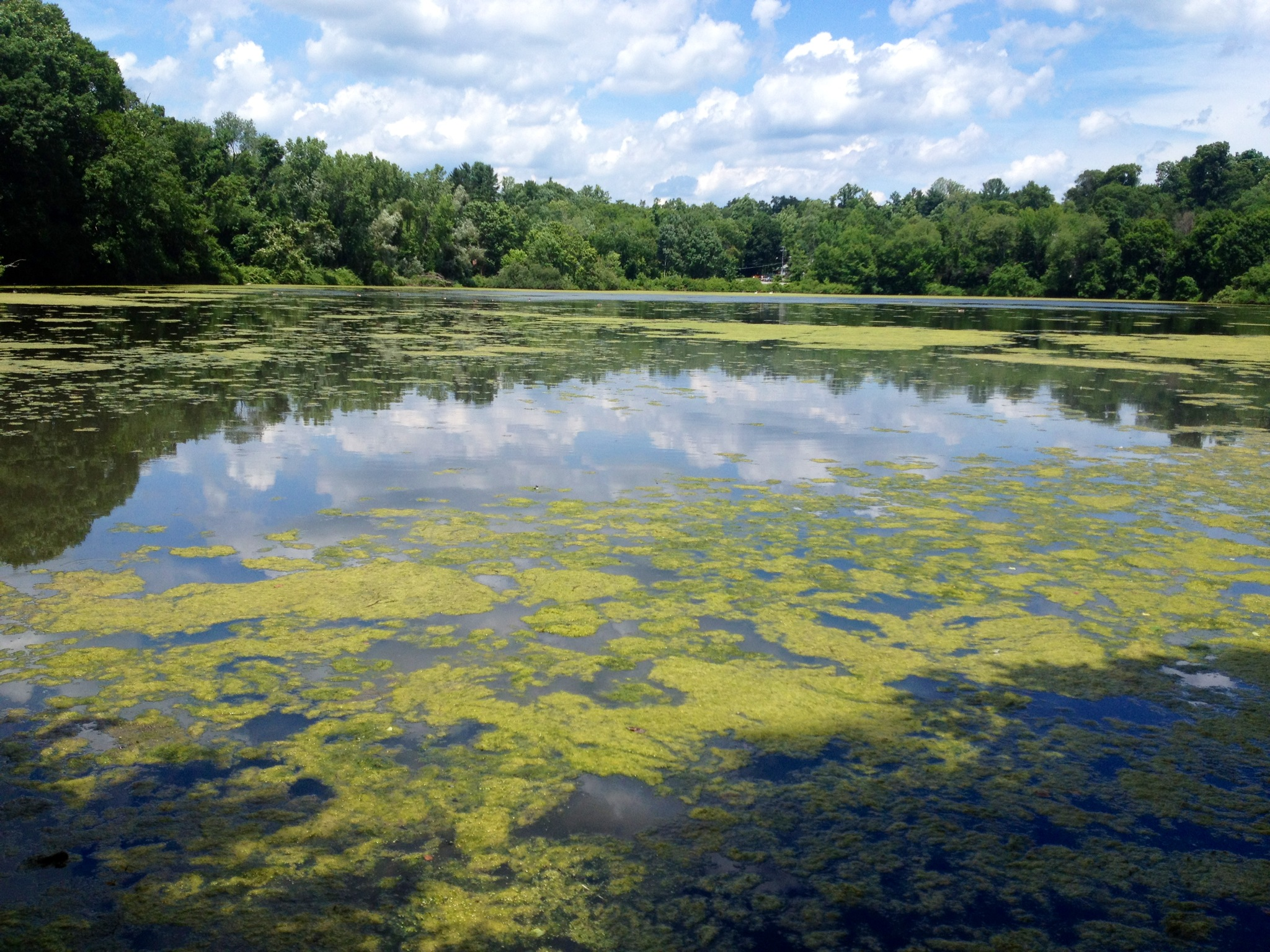
- Lake Shenorock

- Location of Shenorock, New York
- Coordinates: 41°19′55″N 73°44′22″W
- Country: United States
- State: New York
- County: Westchester
- Town: Somers

Area
  - Total: 0.73 sq mi (1.89 km^{2})
  - Land: 0.70 sq mi (1.81 km^{2})
  - Water: 0.031 sq mi (0.08 km^{2})
- Elevation: 509 ft (155 m)

Population (2020)
  - Total: 1,903
  - Density: 2,717.4/sq mi (1,049.21/km^{2})
- Time zone: UTC-5 (Eastern (EST))
  - Summer (DST): UTC-4 (EDT)
- ZIP code: 10587
- Area code: 914
- FIPS code: 36-66872
- GNIS feature ID: 0965049

Shenorock is a hamlet and census-designated place (CDP) located in the town of Somers in Westchester County, New York, United States. As of the 2020 census, Shenorock had a population of 1,903.

The community is named after Shawanórõckquot, a Wiechquaeskeck sachem.

== Geography ==
Shenorock is located at 41°19′55″N 73°44′22″W (41.331850, -73.739323).

According to the United States Census Bureau, the hamlet has a total area of 0.7 square miles (1.8 km^{2}), of which 0.04 square miles (0.10 km^{2}), or 4.17%, is water.

The community is bounded by U.S. Route 202 to the south and New York State Route 118 to the west. Shenorock is north of the Amawalk Reservoir.

== Demographics ==
Historical population
Census	Pop.	Note	%±
2020	1,903		—
U.S. Decennial Census

At the 2000 census there were 1,887 people, 650 households, and 505 families residing in the hamlet. The population density was 2,753.5 inhabitants per square mile (1,063.1/km^{2}). There were 676 housing units at an average density of 986.4 per square mile (380.9/km^{2}). The racial makeup of the hamlet was 95.97% White, 1.22% African American, 0.05% Native American, 0.95% Asian, 0.90% from other races, and 0.90% from two or more races. Hispanic or Latino of any race were 4.66%.

Of the 650 households, 42.5% had children under the age of 18 living with them, 66.9% were married couples living together, 8.5% had a female householder with no husband present, and 22.2% were non-families. 18.2% of households were one person, and 7.2% were one person aged 65 or older. The average household size was 2.90 and the average family size was 3.33.

In the hamlet the population was spread out, with 28.5% under the age of 18, 7.0% from 18 to 24, 33.0% from 25 to 44, 24.2% from 45 to 64, and 7.3% 65 or older. The median age was 36 years. For every 100 females, there were 93.1 males. For every 100 females age 18 and over, there were 92.9 males.

The median household income was $73,333 and the median family income was $79,534. Males had a median income of $50,909 versus $38,080 for females. The per capita income for the hamlet was $25,821. About 1.9% of families and 2.3% of the population were below the poverty line, including 0.7% of those under age 18 and 3.3% of those age 65 or over.

== Education ==
Somers Central School District is the area school district.
