= Black Westchester =

Local African-American newspaper

- June 2025 issue
- Editor: AJ Woodson, Damon Jones
- Frequency: Monthly
- Circulation: 25,000+
- Founder: AJ Woodson
- Founded: 2014
- Country: United States
- Based in: Mount Vernon, Westchester County, New York
- Website: blackwestchester.com

Black Westchester, also known as Black Westchester Magazine, is an African American newspaper and magazine founded in 2014 by journalist AJ Woodson, who currently serves as the outlet's editor-in-chief. Black Westchester is active in the city of Mount Vernon in Westchester County, it reports on local and sometimes national topics. Black Westchester is considered to be one of the largest black newspapers in the county.

== History ==
Black Westchester was founded in 2014 by AJ Woodson, rapper, journalist, author, radio personality and the outlet's editor-in-chief living in the city of Mount Vernon, New York. One of the motivations behind the outlet's founding was him thinking that the city was "in need of something" and lack of news outets for black people. Woodsoon shared his ideas to his friend, Damon Jones, who agreed with Woodsoon and became the outlet's writer. The duo began writing local stories about the city, covering topics they assumed were ignored by bigger outlets, and later started writing national stories. Woodson said Black Westchester was initially not taken seriously by people, with him not getting invited to press conferences and events and not informed of newsworthy incidents taking place. Some of the city's officials treated the outlet as a blog. Woodson said some people also accused the outlet of being racist due to its pro-African American stance.

In 2017, three years after the outlet's foundation, Black Westchester's monthly print magazine was created. In 2020, the magazine's print circulation reportedly reached 25,000. In 2022, Black Westchester celebrated its eight years of existence and five years of the outlet's print edition. Woodson was interviewed by Westchester Magazine and detailed the outlet's history. Black Westchester also reportedly increased in popularity. In February 2023, Woodson held a public meeting as part of Black History Month celebrations, he told attendees the origins of Black Westchester. In August 2023, it was reported that Black Westchester became one of the county's largest black-owned news outlets. In 2024, Black Westchester held its first "40 Under 40 Awards" event where it nominated a number individuals that significantly contributed to the city and featured the event's honorees in its special magazine issue.

== Reporting ==
Black Westchester is a local publication that covers cities of Westchester County, especially Mount Vernon. It likes to report in positive tone about educated black people, some of the newspaper's editors also engage in muckraking. The outlet is known to be critical of Mount Vernon's government, publishing articles like "Mount Vernon Furious Four: Corruption, collusion, obstruction and illegal payouts". Both of Black Westchester's main editors, AJ Woodson and Damon Jones, have openly endorsed politicians, Woodson advertised their campaigns on social media. In 2015, Black Westchester did an exclusive interview with Jamar Smythe, a man who was falsely arrested and imprisoned for four years on drug possession charge, he said it was the only news outlet that reported on him. Black Westchester criticizes police in its reporting, sometimes accusing it of being biased. Black Westchester covers sports, politics, economy and entertainment and holds weekly talk radio shows. Black Westchester said its purpose is to report news with a "black point of view".
