= Westchester Stakes =

Westchester Stakes may refer to:

- Westchester Stakes, former name of the defunct event Willard L. Proctor Memorial Stakes last held at Hollywood Park, California
- Westchester Stakes (NYRA), a New York Racing Association event held at Belmont Park on Long Island, New York
