= Lincolndale, New York =

- Census-designated place
- Location of Lincolndale, New York
- Coordinates: 41°20′20″N 73°43′33″W
- Country: United States
- State: New York
- County: Westchester
- Town: Somers

Area
  - Total: 1.00 sq mi (2.60 km^{2})
  - Land: 0.97 sq mi (2.50 km^{2})
  - Water: 0.042 sq mi (0.11 km^{2})
- Elevation: 338 ft (103 m)

Population (2020)
  - Total: 1,504
  - Density: 1,561.1/sq mi (602.75/km^{2})
- Time zone: UTC-5 (Eastern (EST))
  - Summer (DST): UTC-4 (EDT)
- ZIP code: 10540
- Area code: 914
- FIPS code: 36-42455
- GNIS feature ID: 0955394

Lincolndale is a hamlet and census-designated place (CDP) located in the town of Somers in Westchester County, New York, (along the Westchester County-Putnam County border) United States. As of the 2020 census, Lincolndale had a population of 1,504.

== Geography ==
Lincolndale is located at 41°20′20″N 73°43′33″W (41.338983, -73.725756).

According to the United States Census Bureau, the hamlet has a total area of 1.0 square mile (2.6 km^{2}), of which 0.97 square miles (2.5 km^{2}) is land and 0.039 square miles (0.1 km^{2}), or 4.15%, is water.

== Demographics ==
Historical population
Census	Pop.	Note	%±
2020	1,504		—
U.S. Decennial Census

At the 2000 census there were 2,018 people, 717 households, and 590 families residing in the hamlet. The population density was 1,441.2 inhabitants per square mile (556.5/km^{2}). There were 742 housing units at an average density of 529.9 per square mile (204.6/km^{2}). The racial makeup of the hamlet was 96.68% White, 0.74% African American, 0.05% Native American, 1.39% Asian, 0.15% from other races, and 0.99% from two or more races. Hispanic or Latino of any race were 2.58%.

Of the 717 households, 43.8% had children under the age of 18 living with them, 70.0% were married couples living together, 8.9% had a female householder with no husband present, and 17.6% were non-families. 14.6% of households were one person, and 5.4% were one person aged 65 or older. The average household size was 2.81 and the average family size was 3.12.

In the hamlet the population was spread out, with 27.8% under the age of 18, 4.7% from 18 to 24, 33.0% from 25 to 44, 24.9% from 45 to 64, and 9.6% 65 or older. The median age was 38 years. For every 100 females, there were 95.9 males. For every 100 females age 18 and over, there were 91.8 males.

The median household income was $89,087 and the median family income was $96,290. Males had a median income of $66,875 versus $50,938 for females. The per capita income for the hamlet was $36,024. About 1.4% of families and 0.8% of the population were below the poverty line, including none of those under the age of 18, or over 65.

== Education ==
Somers Central School District is the area school district.
