= Westchester Station =

Community in Nova Scotia, Canada

Coordinates: 45°35′6″N 63°39′52″W

Westchester Station in Nova Scotia

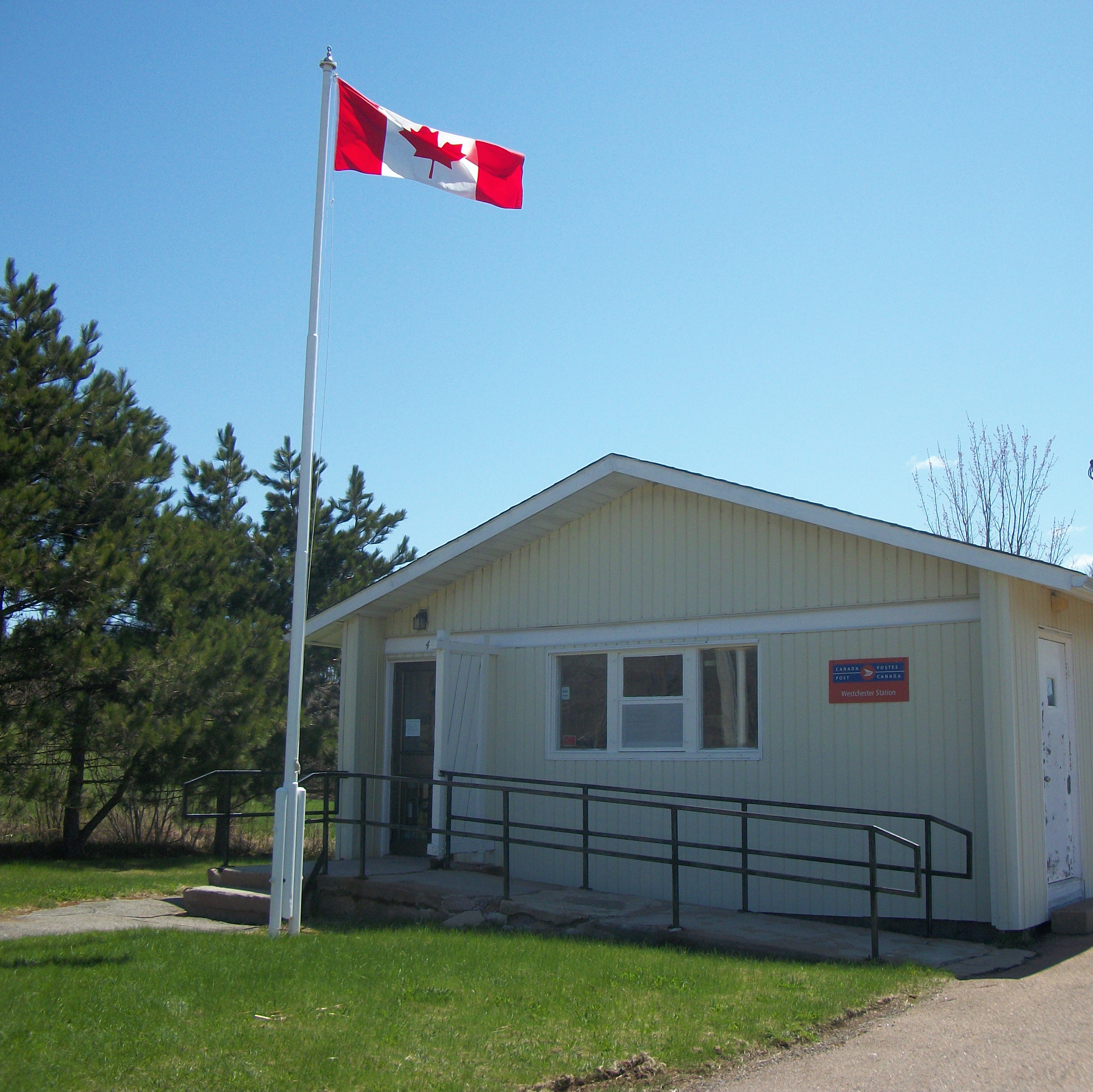
Rural post office in Westchester Station, 2014

Westchester Station is a community in the Canadian province of Nova Scotia, located in Cumberland County. Eagle Hill Cemetery is located in the community.

With town nearby called Westchester Station. With it being a small town it holds some history. The station part of the name comes from the old train station that used to be in the town. Which no longer exists after the teardown of it in the late 1970s. Mainly due to the lack of passengers for the service. The location of the town was a key link in World War II however, it had productions in lumber and timber. Also produced some man power to fight in the war effort. It was a hub of a place for soldiers to come into on the way to Halifax.
