= Westchester County, New York =

County in New York, United States

Westchester County
- County
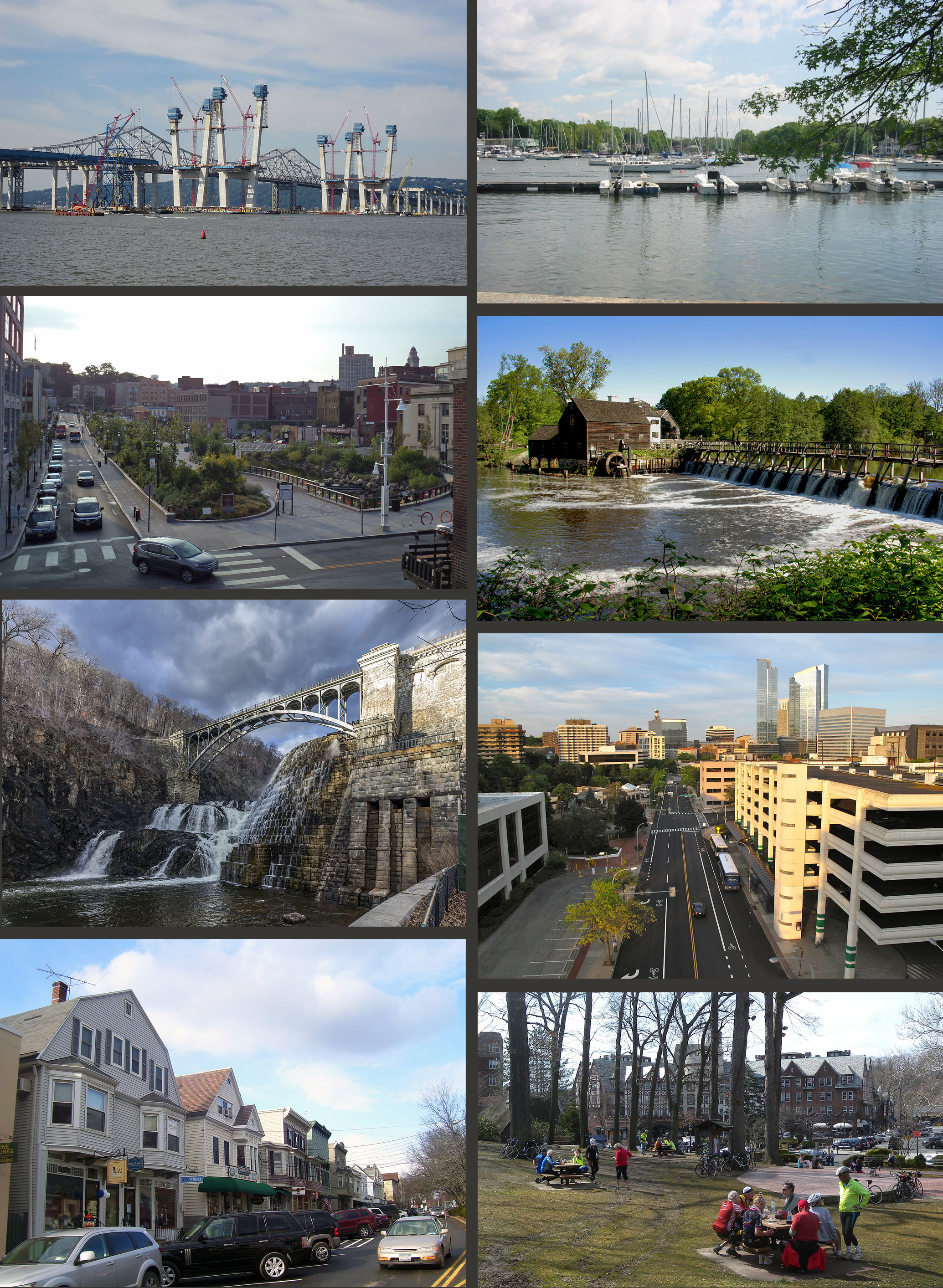
- Clockwise from top: the original Tappan Zee Bridge and replacement; Mamaroneck Harbor; Philipsburg Manor; downtown White Plains; downtown Scarsdale; shops in Katonah; the New Croton Dam; Larkin Plaza in Yonkers

- Flag Seal
- Interactive map of Westchester County
- Coordinates: 41°09′N 73°46′W
- Country: United States
- State: New York
- Founded: November 1, 1683; 343 years ago (Note: "As one of the original divisions of New York State, Westchester was organized November 1, 1683.")
- Named for: Chester, England
- County seat: White Plains
- Largest city: Yonkers

Government
  - Body: Westchester County Board of Legislators
  - Executive: Ken Jenkins (D)

Area
  - Total: 490 sq mi (1,280 km^{2})
  - Land: 430 sq mi (1,100 km^{2})
  - Water: 69 sq mi (180 km^{2})

Population (2020)
  - Total: 1,004,457
  - Estimate (2025): 1,015,743 ▲
  - Density: 2,000/sq mi (770/km^{2})
- Demonym: Westchesterite

Economics
  - Median income: $114,651 (2018-2022)

GDP
  - Total: $120.154 billion (2024)
- Time zone: UTC−5 (North American EST)
  - Summer (DST): UTC−4 (EDT)
- ZIP Codes: 105xx–108xx (Note: The full set is as follows: 10501–10507, 10509–10511, 10514, 10517–10523, 10526–10528, 10530, 10532–10533, 10535–10536, 10538, 10540, 10543, 10545–10550, 10552–10553, 10560, 10562, 10566–10567, 10570, 10573, 10576–10578, 10580, 10583, 10587–10591, 10594–10598, 10601, 10603–10607, 10701, 10703–10710, 10801, 10803–10805.)
- Area code: 914
- Congressional districts: 16th, 17th
- FIPS code: 36-119
- GNIS feature ID: 974157
- Website: westchestercountyny.gov

Westchester County is a county located in the southeastern portion of the U.S. state of New York, bordering the Long Island Sound and the Byram River to its east and the Hudson River on its west. The county is the seventh most populous county in the State of New York and the most populous north of New York City. According to the 2020 United States census, Westchester County's population had risen to 1,004,456, its highest decennial count ever and an increase of 55,344 (5.8%) from the 949,113 counted in 2010. Westchester covers an area of 450 square miles (1,200 km^{2}), consisting of six cities, 19 towns, and 23 villages. Established in 1683, Westchester was named after the city of Chester, England. The county seat is the city of White Plains, while the most populous municipality in the county is the city of Yonkers, with 211,569 residents per the 2020 census. The county is part of the Hudson Valley region of the state.

By 2024, the county's median household income had risen to US$118,976. Westchester County ranks second in the state after New York County (the New York City borough of Manhattan) for median income per person, with a higher concentration of incomes in smaller households. Simultaneously, Westchester County had the highest median annual residential property taxes of any U.S. county in 2023, at $15,373. Westchesterites hold a strong sense of county identity. Politically, Westchester is a blue wall.

Westchester County is one of the centrally located counties within the New York metropolitan area. The county is positioned with New York City, plus Nassau and Suffolk counties (on Long Island, across the Long Island Sound) to its south; Putnam County to its north; Fairfield County, Connecticut to its east (partially across the Byram River); and Rockland County and Bergen County, New Jersey across the Hudson River to its west. Westchester was the first suburban area of its scale in the world to develop, due mostly to the upper-middle-class development of entire communities in the late 19th century and the subsequent rapid population growth.

Westchester County has numerous road and mass transit connections to New York City, and the county is home to the headquarters of large multinational corporations including IBM, Mastercard, PepsiCo, and Regeneron Pharmaceuticals. Westchester County high school students often feature prominently as winners of the International Science and Engineering Fair and similar STEM-based academic awards.

== History ==
At the time of European contact in the 16th and 17th centuries, this region was a part of Lenape Country, properly called Lenapehoking. The Lenape, also known as the 'Delaware' Nation, are an Algonquian people, related to large nations like the Wampanoag, Anishinaabe, Abenaki, and the Powhatan of Tsenacommacah as well as neighboring communities like the Manhattans, Weckquaesgeek and Siwanoy bands of the Wappinger in the south, and Tankiteke, Sintsink and Kitchawank Wappinger in the north.

The first European explorers to visit the Westchester area were Giovanni da Verrazzano in 1524 and Henry Hudson in 1609. Dutch settlers began arriving in the 1620s, followed by settlers from England in the 1640s. Westchester County was one of the original twelve counties of the Province of New York, created by an act of the New York General Assembly in 1683. At the time it included present-day Bronx County, and abutted then-Dutchess County to the north. By 1775, Westchester was the richest and most populous county in the colony of New York. During the Revolutionary War, Westchester was a notorious no-man's land, known as the Neutral Ground, between the British and the American Patriot forces. Although the war devastated the county, recovery after the war was rapid. In 1788, five years after the end of the war, the county was divided into 20 towns. In 1790, the first federal census recorded a population of 24,000 for the county.

Two developments in the first half of the 19th century—the construction of the first Croton Dam and Aqueduct, and the coming of the railroad—had enormous impacts on the growth of Westchester. The Croton Dam and Aqueduct was begun in 1837 and completed in 1842; now a National Historic Landmark, the Croton Aqueduct is considered one of the great engineering achievements of the 19th century. In the 1840s, the first railroads were built in Westchester, and included the New York and Harlem Railroad, the Hudson River Railroad, (Note: The Hudson River Railroad later became part of the New York Central Railroad and is currently the Hudson Line of the Metro-North Railroad.) and the New York and New Haven Railroad. The railroads often determined the growth of a town, and the population shifted from Northern to Southern Westchester. By 1860, the total county population was 99,000, with the most populated city being Yonkers.

The period following the American Civil War enabled entrepreneurs in the New York area to create fortunes, and many built large estates, such as Lyndhurst, in Westchester. During the latter half of the 19th century, Westchester's transportation system and labor force attracted a manufacturing base, particularly along the Hudson River and Nepperhan Creek. In 1874, the western portion of the present Bronx County was transferred to New York County, and in 1895 the remainder of the present Bronx County was also transferred to New York County. These would later split from Manhattan to form a county.

During the 20th century, the rural character of Westchester transformed into the suburban county known today. The Bronx River Parkway, completed in 1925, was the first modern, multi-lane limited-access roadway in North America. The development of Westchester's parks and parkway systems supported existing communities and encouraged the establishment of new ones, transforming the development pattern for Westchester. With the need for homes expanding after World War II, multistory apartment houses appeared in the urbanized areas of the county, while the market for single-family houses continued to expand. By 1950, the total county population was 625,816. Major interstate highways were constructed in Westchester during the 1950s and 1960s. The establishment of these roadways, along with the construction of the Tappan Zee Bridge, led to further growth in the county.

== Geography ==
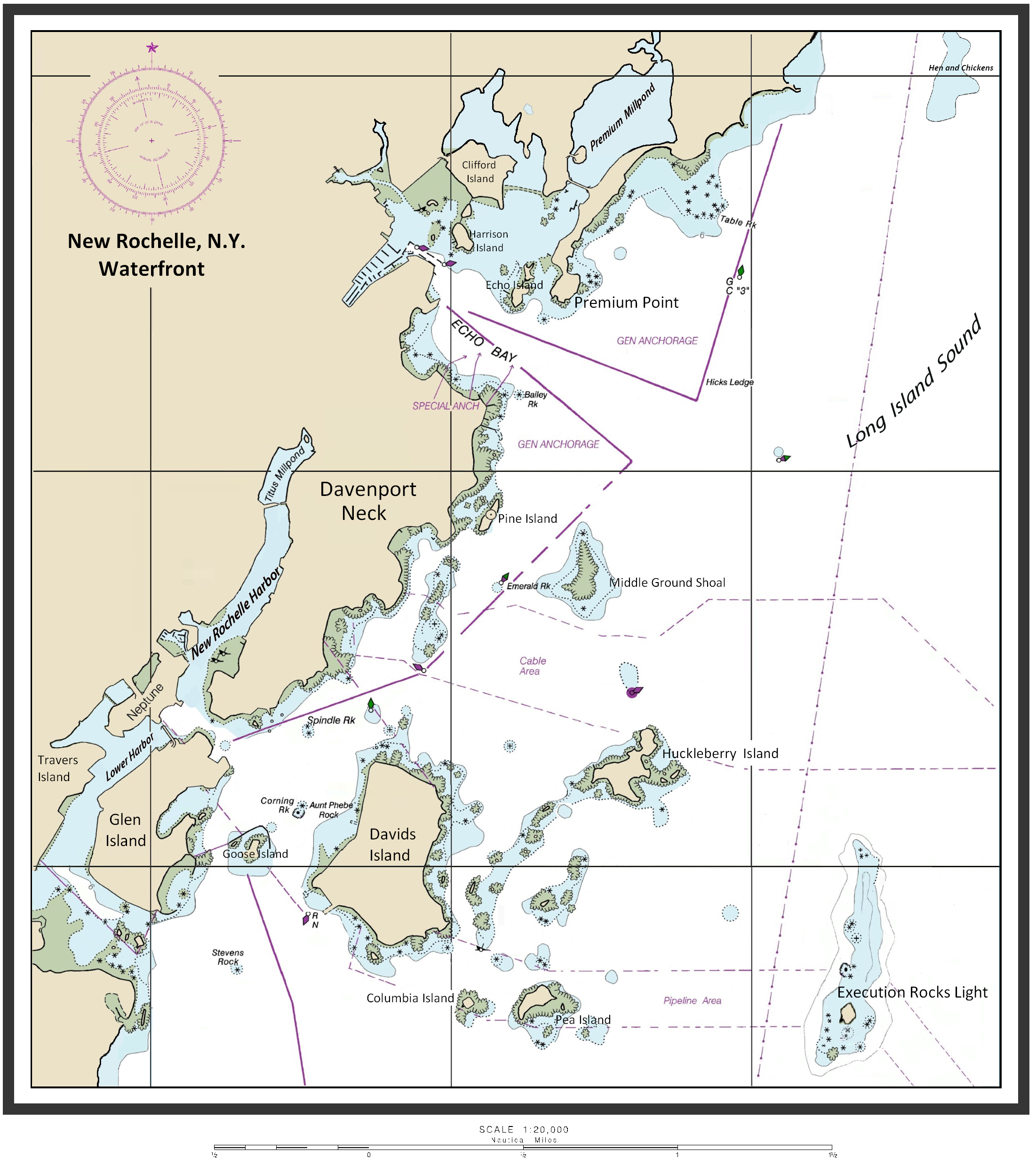
Harbors, islands and shoreline of New Rochelle

Westchester County is located in the New York metropolitan area and Downstate New York, north of New York City and south of Upstate New York. It shares its southern boundary with New York City and its northern border with Putnam County. It is bordered on the west side by the Hudson River and on the east side by the Long Island Sound and Fairfield County, Connecticut. According to the U.S. Census Bureau, the county has a total area of 500 square miles (1,300 km^{2}), of which 430 square miles (1,100 km^{2}) is land and 69 square miles (180 km^{2}) (14%) is water.

Where Pelham Manor meets Pelham Bay Park in the Bronx, the southern border of Westchester is just under 11 miles (18 km) from Columbus Circle in Manhattan. At over 2,700 acres (1,100 ha), Pelham Bay Park is the largest of New York City's parks, forming a substantial buffer between suburban Westchester and the urban Bronx, while Van Cortlandt Park to the west acts as a similar buffer.

=== Long Island Sound shore ===
Westchester's Long Island Sound shore is generally rocky, interspersed with tidal mud flats, marshes and wetlands, as well as several natural and artificially-maintained sand beaches. Municipal and county owned parks provide access to beaches, nature preserves and passive and active waterfront recreational facilities. Several large harbors lie along the shore including Milton Harbor in Rye, Mamaroneck Harbor, Larchmont Harbor, and Echo Bay, and the upper and lower harbors in southern New Rochelle.

A number of islands can be found off the Long Island Sound shore, most of which are located in New Rochelle. Davids Island, the former location of the U.S. Army's Fort Slocum, is currently unoccupied but is slated for use as passive parkland; Glen Island, currently a Westchester Parks Department run beach and park, was one of the first amusement parks in the country serving as a summer resort at the turn of the twentieth century; Huckleberry Island is largely undeveloped, and has one of the largest rookeries in western Long Island Sound; Echo Island is owned and used by a private yacht club; Execution Rocks is the site of a 19th-century lighthouse listed on the National Register of Historic Places; Columbia, Pea, and Goose Islands are undeveloped; Clifford, Harrison and Tank Islands are part of the Five Islands Park and nature preserve; while Oak and Pine Islands are used as private residences.

=== Hudson River ===
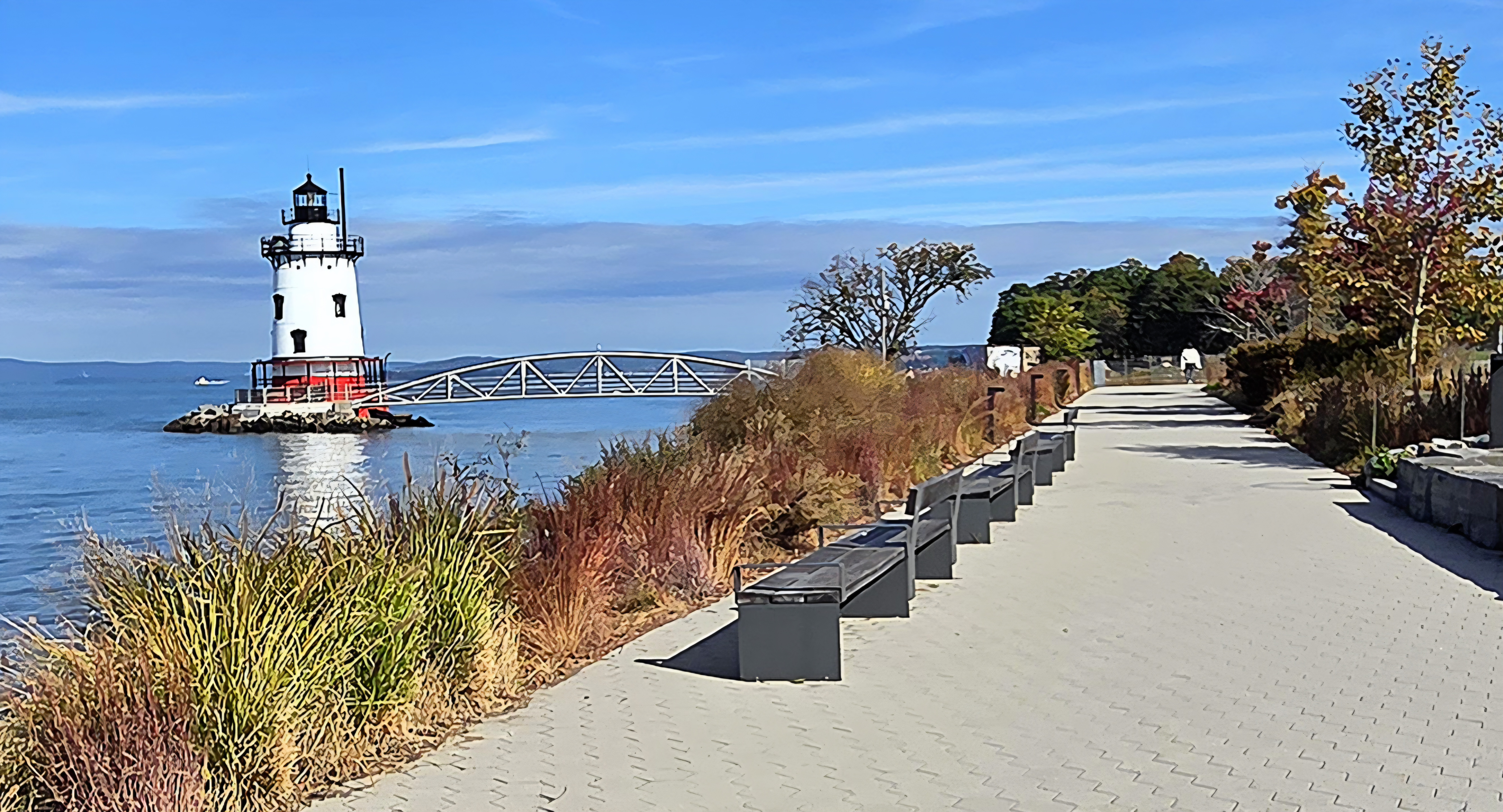
Sleepy Hollow section of Westchester RiverWalk, with Tarrytown Light on the left and Kingsland Point Park in the background

The widest section of the Hudson River, at 3.6 miles (6 km), is found between the Westchester and Rockland County shorelines immediately north of Croton Point. In Colonial times, this area was called the Tappan Zee or Sea. The Hudson River is tidal and brackish through Westchester and contains a small number of estuarine marshes. Two bridges span the Hudson in Westchester: the Bear Mountain Bridge crosses at Cortlandt and the Tappan Zee Bridge at Tarrytown. Municipal, county and state-owned parks provide access to waterfront landmarks and sites, including Croton Point in Croton, Kingsland Point in Sleepy Hollow and JFK Memorial Marina in Yonkers.

The Hudson River waterfront in Westchester is in a transitional period, converting from primarily industrial uses to mixed residential, commercial, retail, and recreational uses. This transformation is most notable in Yonkers, Hastings-on-Hudson, Dobbs Ferry, Irvington, Tarrytown, Sleepy Hollow, Ossining, and Peekskill, where redevelopment projects are in various stages of design and completion. In 2004, the county began a project to create Westchester RiverWalk, a walkway along the Hudson River of 51.5 miles (80 km) which will provide pedestrian access between New York City and Putnam County. 32.9 miles of the route are complete and accessible.

At 987 feet (301 m), the highest elevation in the county is a U.S. Coast and Geodetic Survey benchmark known as "Bailey" in Mountain Lakes Park near the Connecticut state line. The lowest elevation is sea level, along both the Hudson and Long Island Sound.

=== Watersheds ===
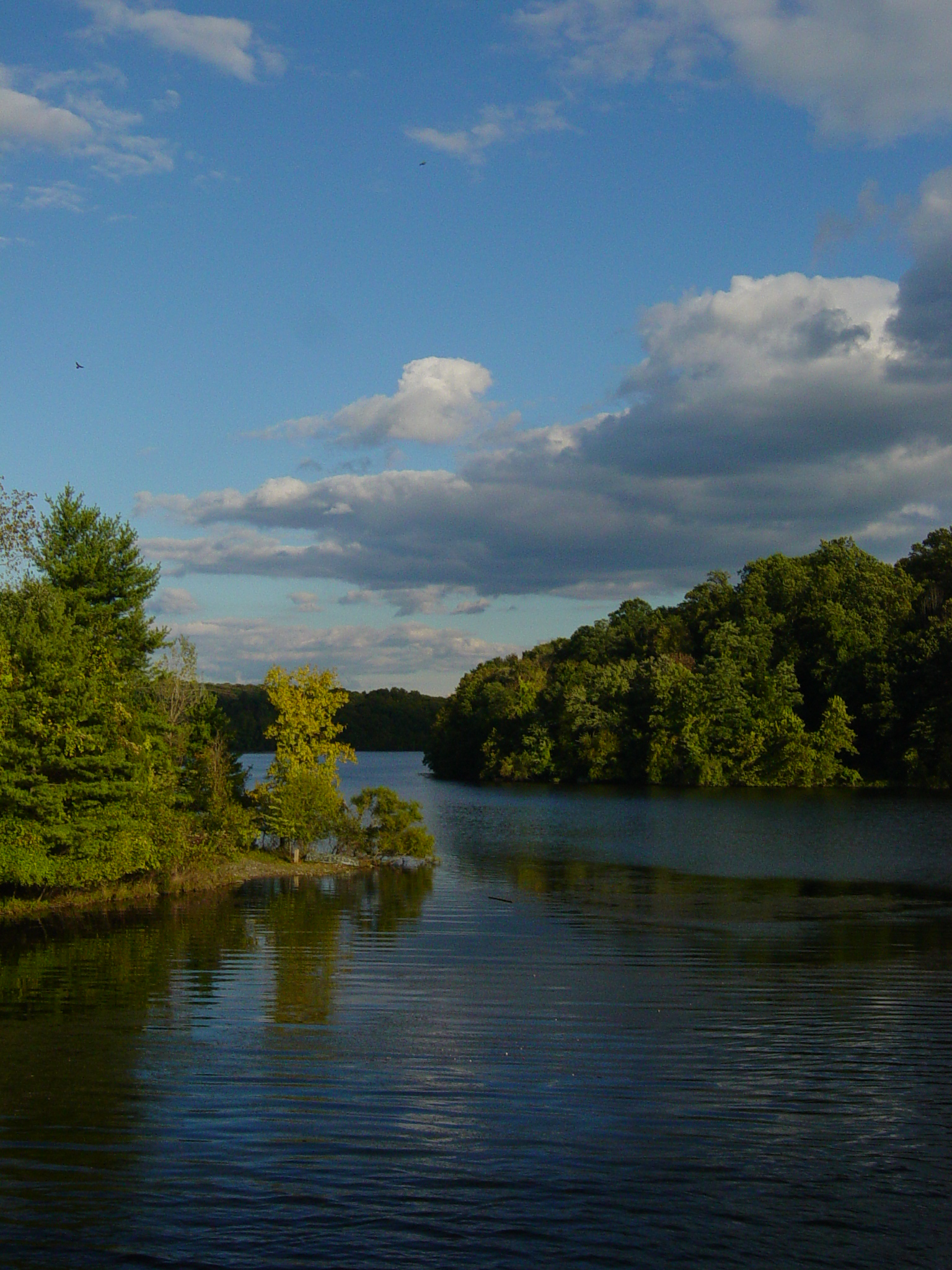
The New Croton Reservoir is the largest of many in the county.

Westchester County is divided into six primary drainage basins or watersheds: the Upper and Lower Long Island Sound; and the Bronx, Upper Hudson, Lower Hudson, and Croton River basins. Within these primary drainage basins are approximately 60 smaller basins, or subwatersheds. The principal streams draining the southern part of the county include Beaver Swamp Brook, Blind Brook, Bronx River, Hutchinson River, Mamaroneck River, Saw Mill River, Sheldrake River, Stephenson Brook and Tibbetts Brook. The primary streams draining the central part of the county include Byram River, Kisco River, Mianus River, Mill River, Pocantico River and Silvermine River. The principal streams draining the northern part of the county include Dickey Brook, Furnace Brook, Hallocks Mill Brook, Hunter Brook, Muscoot River, Peekskill Hollow Brook, and Titicus River. The county contains several major reservoirs; The Croton system and the Kensico Reservoir are important components of the New York City water supply system. The system is a series of interconnected reservoirs and lakes in northern Westchester and Putnam Counties that provide 10% of New York City's water under normal conditions and up to 30% in times of drought. The components of the system include the New Croton Reservoir, the Cross River Reservoir, the Titicus Reservoir, the Amawalk Reservoir, and the Muscoot Reservoir. Other major reservoirs are the Kensico and Byram Lake Reservoir, while there are a number of smaller reservoirs throughout the county.

The Westchester County Department of Planning divides the county into North, Central and South sub-regions.

=== Geology ===
The rock that underlies Manhattan and Westchester is chiefly gneiss and mica-schist, with layers of dolomitic marble and serpentine.

=== Climate ===
The climate of Westchester County is borderline humid subtropical and humid continental (Köppen: Cfa/Dfa). Winters are cold, wet, and occasionally snowy throughout the county, with more snow inland in higher elevations. Summers are hot inland but cooler towards the coast, with a relative dryness in the early summer. Precipitation is plentiful and in some elevated areas reaches over 50 inches. Snowfall is more common in Westchester than in New York City, with the exception of the southeast of the county where snowfall is often between 20 and 25 inches. In January, inland areas have a low of 21–26 °F and a high of 34–37 °F while coastal areas have a low of 27–30 °F and a high of 38–41 °F. In the summer, this effect is much milder. Coastal areas, including Mamaroneck, New Rochelle, Rye, and Port Chester have highs of 81–83 °F and lows of 68–73 °F, while inland highs will be 84–87 °F and lows will be 65–70 °F. Winds can be heavy, especially by the coast.

== Demographics ==
Historical population
Census	Pop.	Note	%±
1790	23,978		—
1800	27,428		14.4%
1810	30,272		10.4%
1820	32,638		7.8%
1830	36,456		11.7%
1840	48,686		33.5%
1850	58,263		19.7%
1860	99,497		70.8%
1870	131,348		32.0%
1880	108,988		−17.0%
1890	146,772		34.7%
1900	184,257		25.5%
1910	283,055		53.6%
1920	344,436		21.7%
1930	520,947		51.2%
1940	573,558		10.1%
1950	625,816		9.1%
1960	808,891		29.3%
1970	894,404		10.6%
1980	866,599		−3.1%
1990	874,866		1.0%
2000	923,459		5.6%
2010	949,113		2.8%
2020	1,004,457		5.8%
2025 (est.)	1,015,743	▲	1.1%
U.S. Decennial Census; 1790–1960 1900–1990; 1990–2000, 2010 and 2020

=== 2020 census ===
Westchester County, New York – Racial and ethnic composition Note: the US Census treats Hispanic/Latino as an ethnic category. This table excludes Latinos from the racial categories and assigns them to a separate category. Hispanics/Latinos may be of any race.
Race / Ethnicity (NH = Non-Hispanic)	Pop 1980	Pop 1990	Pop 2000	Pop 2010	Pop 2020	% 1980	% 1990	% 2000	% 2010	% 2020
White alone (NH)	698,463	640,558	591,776	544,563	497,684	80.60%	73.22%	64.08%	57.38%	49.55%
Black or African American alone (NH)	102,443	114,265	125,227	126,585	131,010	11.82%	13.06%	13.56%	13.34%	13.04%
Native American or Alaska Native alone (NH)	722	1,029	1,072	1,141	1,017	0.08%	0.12%	0.12%	0.12%	0.10%
Asian alone (NH)	15,126	31,611	40,941	51,123	64,907	1.75%	3.61%	4.43%	5.39%	6.46%
Native Hawaiian or Pacific Islander alone (NH)	x	x	232	218	150	x	x	0.03%	0.02%	0.01%
Other race alone (NH)	4,279	1,209	3,081	3,757	8,651	0.49%	0.14%	0.33%	0.40%	0.86%
Mixed race or Multiracial (NH)	x	x	17,006	14,694	31,704	x	x	1.84%	1.55%	3.16%
Hispanic or Latino (any race)	45,566	86,194	144,124	207,032	269,334	5.26%	9.85%	15.61%	21.81%	26.81%
Total	866,599	874,866	923,459	949,113	1,004,457	100.00%	100.00%	100.00%	100.00%	100.00%

According to the 2020 American Community Survey, the county's Latino population was: 5.12% Puerto Rican, 4.46% Dominican, 4.14% Mexican, 2.73% Ecuadorian, 1.73% Guatemalan, 1.26% Colombian.

Since the late 20th century, population growth in Westchester has been driven by significant international migration and, notably, an increase in the Hispanic population (between 1990 and 2010, it grew by 22%) and the Asian population. By 2020, the county population exceeded 1,000,000, with the growth in the Hispanic population once again accounting for the majority of the overall population increase during that decade. According to the July 2024 census, 27.5% of Westchester residents identified as Hispanic or Latino. A notable Japanese population has made its home in Westchester County as of 2026. Domestically, Westchester receives in-migration from Manhattan and the Bronx.

=== 2010 census ===
As of 2010, there were 949,113 residents at an average density of 807 per square mile (312/km^{2}). The racial makeup of the county was 57.4% non-Hispanic White, 15.6% African American, 0.4% Native American, 5.4% Asian, 0.1% Pacific Islander, 7.6% from other races, and 3.2% from two or more races. Hispanic or Latino of any race were 21.8% of the population. 71.7% spoke only English at home, while 14.4% spoke Spanish, 3.5% Italian, 1.1% Portuguese and 1.1% French at home.

There were 337,142 households, of which 34% had children under the age of 18 living with them, 53.9% were married couples living together, 12.2% had a female householder with no husband present, and 30.2% were non-families. Of all households 25.7% were made up of individuals, and 10.3% had someone living alone who was 65 years of age or older. The average household size was 2.67 and the average family size was 3.21.

Age distribution was 25% under the age of 18, 7.2% from 18 to 24, 30.4% from 25 to 44, 23.5% from 45 to 64, and 14% who were 65 years of age or older. The median age was 38 years. For every 100 females, there were 91.70 males. For every 100 females age 18 and over, there were 87.30 males.

According to census data, the per capita income for the county in 1999 was $36,726. The American Community Survey lists Westchester in 2011 with the median household income of $77,006, the 47th highest in the country. The U.S. Census Bureau reports that 6.4% of families and 8.7% (2003) of the population were below the poverty line, including 26.53% of those under age 18 and 7.60% of those age 65 or over.

=== 2018 ===
From 2014 to 2018 there were 375,852 housing units and 347,332 households. The owner-occupied housing rate was 61.3% and the median monthly owner costs of a house were $3,398 with a mortgage and $1,426 without. The median gross rent in 2018 was $1,493, up $517 from the monthly owner cost without a mortgage. The average persons per household in 2018 was 2.71 and 33.3% of residents spoke a language other than English at home. 21.9% of Westchester was under 18 and 17.1% were aged 65 and older.

Westchester County's median income was $92,758 and the per capita income was $54,572. The Census Bureau reported 65.4% of the county's residents aged 16 and older were employed in the civilian labor force, and 59.5% of women worked in the labor force. 8.3% of the county lived below the poverty line from 2014 to 2018.

=== Expatriates ===
As of 2000, several different expatriate populations lived in Westchester County. Notable French communities are located in Larchmont, Mamaroneck, and New Rochelle; while Scarsdale, Tarrytown and Bronxville are the preferred locations for Japanese immigrants and Japanese Americans.

== Health ==
In March 2020 during the COVID-19 pandemic in the United States, the state government ordered a one square mile "containment zone" in the northern part of the city of New Rochelle. Part of New Rochelle is adjacent to the Bronx, where the majority of New York State's COVID-19 positive cases were (as of May 8, 350,000 out of 20 million residents). As of April 22 there were a total of 25,276 cases, 838 deaths, and 9,371 recoveries. As of May 22, 2020, there were between 30 and 35,000 cases going both by COVID-19 testing and serological samples, constituting the highest number of highest per capita infections in the world: 3% out of 1 million residents. On May 26, 2020, the area started their first phase of reopening after being placed on lockdown for two months.

== Communities ==
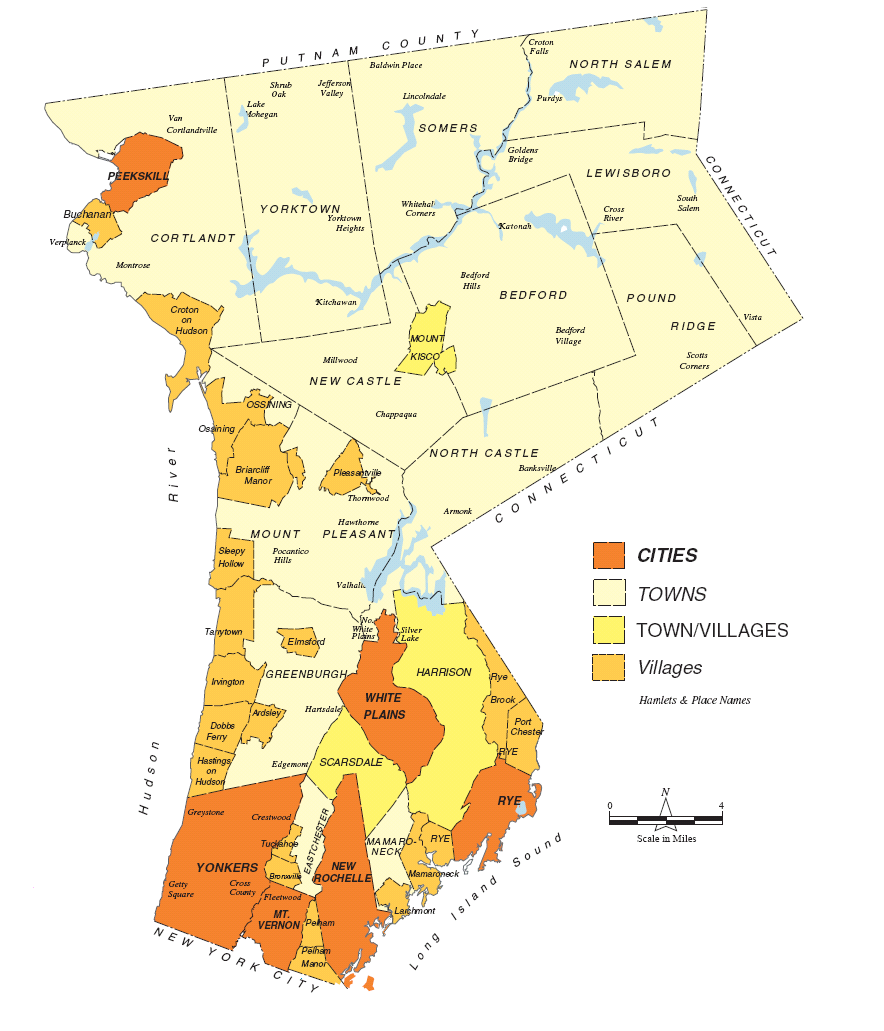
Municipalities in Westchester County, New York

Westchester County has six cities, 19 towns, and 23 villages.

Cities in Westchester have many well established sub-areas within the municipal boundaries. Many of these are similar to hamlets and date back to as early as the late 1600s such as Cooper's Corners in New Rochelle. These areas also include some of the first planned communities in the country such as New Rochelle's Residence Park, Rochelle Park and Heights and Sutton Manor.

The six cities in the county are:

City	Population	Area mi^{2})	Density (Pop. per mi^{2})	Founded/first incorporated	Notes
Yonkers	211,569	20.3	11,749.9	1646 / 1854	3rd most populated city in New York State
New Rochelle	79,726	13.2	7,750.9	1688 / 1899	7th most populated city in New York State
Mount Vernon	73,893	4.4	16,824.5	1664 / 1853	8th most populated city in New York State
White Plains	59,559	9.9	6,116.8	1721	11th most populated city in New York State, also Westchester county seat
Peekskill	25,431	5.5	5,854.3	1684 / 1816	29th most populated city in New York State
Rye	16,592	20.0	2,834.9	1660 / 1904	37th most populated city in New York State, also the name of a town

Any land area in the county that is not contained in one of the cities is in a town. A town may have from zero to multiple villages. The largest city in the county by population is Yonkers with over 211,000 residents. The city with the highest population density is Mount Vernon with a density of 16,824 individuals per square mile.

The towns of Harrison, Mount Kisco, and Scarsdale are coterminous with the villages of the same names. Two villages are split between two towns: Briarcliff Manor crosses the border between Ossining town and Mount Pleasant, and Mamaroneck village straddles the boundary between Mamaroneck town and Rye town.

With the exception of the towns of Rye, Pelham, Harrison, Mount Kisco, and Scarsdale, all the towns contain area and residents which do not belong to any village. These areas may contain communities referred to as hamlets, or "unincorporated areas". Hamlets have no legal status and depend upon the town for all municipal government and services. There are also areas called census-designated places (CDPs), which are defined by the U.S. Census Bureau for statistical purposes only. A CDP may or may not correspond to a hamlet.

Because some municipalities have the same name, it is often necessary to indicate whether one is referring to the city, town, village, or hamlet. For example, the town of Rye is completely separate from the city of Rye. Pelham is the name of a town and also of a village in the town. The village of Mamaroneck is located partially in the town of Mamaroneck and partially in the town of Rye, but has nothing to do with the city of Rye.

ZIP Codes in Westchester often are not coterminous with the actual municipality borders, causing mailing addresses to sometimes differ from the actual municipal location in which a property resides. For instance, the ZIP Codes for Bronxville, Larchmont, Rye, and Scarsdale contain large areas that lie outside of those municipalities.

All of the towns have justice courts, and some of the villages do as well.

The towns are listed as follows:

- Town
  - Villages (if any), one per bullet
  - CDPs (if any), all listed on a single bullet
  - Communities not in a village or CDP (if any), all listed on a single bullet

(The list of towns, villages, and CDPs is complete. The listing of additional communities should not be considered complete.)

- Bedford, containing no villages:
  - (contains the CDPs of Bedford, Bedford Hills and Katonah)
  - (plus additional area belonging to no CDP)
- Cortlandt, containing two villages:
  - Buchanan
  - Croton-on-Hudson
  - (contains the CDPs of Crugers, Montrose and Verplanck)
  - (plus additional area belonging to no village or CDP, including the community of Cortlandt Manor)
- Eastchester, containing two villages:
  - Bronxville
  - Tuckahoe
  - (contains the CDP of Eastchester, which encompasses all area outside the villages)
- Greenburgh, containing six villages:
  - Ardsley
  - Dobbs Ferry
  - Elmsford
  - Hastings-on-Hudson
  - Irvington
  - Tarrytown
  - (contains the CDPs of Fairview, Greenville and Hartsdale)
  - (plus additional area belonging to no village or CDP)
- Harrison, coterminous with the village of the same name (includes the communities of Purchase and West Harrison)
- Lewisboro, containing no villages:
  - (contains the CDP of Goldens Bridge)
  - (plus additional area belonging to no CDP, including the communities of Cross River, Lewisboro, South Salem, Vista and Waccabuc)
- Mamaroneck, containing two villages:
  - Larchmont
  - Mamaroneck (shared with the Town of Rye)
  - (plus additional area belonging to no village (or CDP))
- Mount Kisco, coterminous with village of same name
- Mount Pleasant, containing three villages:
  - Briarcliff Manor (This village is shared with the Town of Ossining.)
  - Pleasantville
  - Sleepy Hollow (formerly named North Tarrytown)
  - (contains the CDPs of Hawthorne, Thornwood and Valhalla)
  - (plus additional area belonging to no village or CDP, including the community of Pocantico Hills)
- New Castle, containing no villages:
  - (contains the CDPs of Chappaqua and Millwood)
  - (plus additional area belonging to no CDP)
- North Castle, containing no villages:
  - (contains the CDP of Armonk)
  - (plus additional area belonging to no CDP, including the communities of Banksville and North White Plains)
- North Salem, containing no villages:
  - (contains the portion of the CDP of Peach Lake that is not in Putnam County)
  - (plus additional area belonging to no CDP, including the communities of Croton Falls, Purdys and Salem Center)
- Ossining, containing two villages:
  - Briarcliff Manor (This village is shared with the Town of Mount Pleasant.)
  - Ossining (The village of Ossining is contained within the Town of Ossining.)
  - (plus additional area belonging to no village or CDP, including the community of Crotonville)
- Pelham, containing two villages:
  - Pelham (The Village of Pelham is contained within the Town of Pelham.)
  - Pelham Manor
  - (The villages cover the entire area of the town.)
  - (The village of North Pelham existed from 1896 to 1975, when it was merged into the village of Pelham.)
- Pound Ridge, containing no villages:
  - (contains the CDP of Scotts Corners)
  - (plus additional area belonging to no CDP, including the community of Pound Ridge)
- Town of Rye (Rye is also the name of a city.), containing three villages:
  - Mamaroneck (This village is shared with the Town of Mamaroneck. The portion in Rye is unofficially also called "Rye Neck". The city of Rye separates Mamaroneck from the rest of the town of Rye.)
  - Port Chester
  - Rye Brook (Prior to 1982, Rye Brook was the unincorporated area of the Town of Rye, and still shares the same ZIP Code as Port Chester.)
  - (The villages cover the entire area of the town.)
- Scarsdale, coterminous with village of same name
- Somers, containing no villages:
  - (contains the CDPs of Heritage Hills, Lincolndale and Shenorock)
  - (plus additional area belonging to no CDP, including the communities of Amawalk, Baldwin Place, Granite Springs, and Somers)
- Yorktown, containing no villages:
  - (contains the CDPs of Crompond, Jefferson Valley-Yorktown, Lake Mohegan, Shrub Oak and Yorktown Heights)
  - (plus additional area belonging to no CDP, including the community of Kitchawan)

== Economy ==
Due to its proximity to New York City, many Fortune 500 companies are headquartered in Westchester County, including:

- MasterCard in the hamlet of Purchase
- PepsiCo in the hamlet of Purchase
- IBM in the hamlet of Armonk
- ITT Corporation in the city of White Plains
- Jarden in the city of Rye
- Universal American in the city of White Plains
- Regeneron Pharmaceuticals in the village of Tarrytown

=== High technology ===
Tech Valley is a marketing name for the eastern part of New York State, including the Hudson Valley and the Capital District. The term originated in 1998 to promote the Greater Albany metropolitan area as a competitor to regions such as Silicon Valley and Boston. It has since grown to represent the counties in New York between IBM's Westchester County plants in the south and the Canada–U.S. border to the north.

=== Biotechnology ===
Westchester County has also developed a burgeoning biotechnology sector in the 21st century, with over $1 billion in planned private investment as of 2016, spurring Westchester Magazine to nickname the county Biochester. In April 2017, county officials unveiled plans for an 80-acre, 3 million square-foot biotechnology hub to be built with US$1.2 billion in private investment on vacant land adjacent to Westchester Medical Center in Valhalla; the bioscience center, a public-private partnership, is anticipated to create 12,000 new jobs and include over 2.25 million square feet of biotechnology research space.

== Education ==
Westchester County contains 48 public school districts, nearly 120 private college-preparatory and parochial schools, and 14 colleges and universities. Many public and private high schools are continuously ranked among the best in New York State and the United States. Public schools in the county are largely funded by local property taxes, and the median annual residential property tax bill for Westchester County residents was $15,373 in 2013, the highest of any U.S. county. According to the 2018 rankings provided by the education website Niche, taking into account public comments, 28 of the top 100 school districts in the state of New York were located in Westchester County.

== Culture and recreation ==
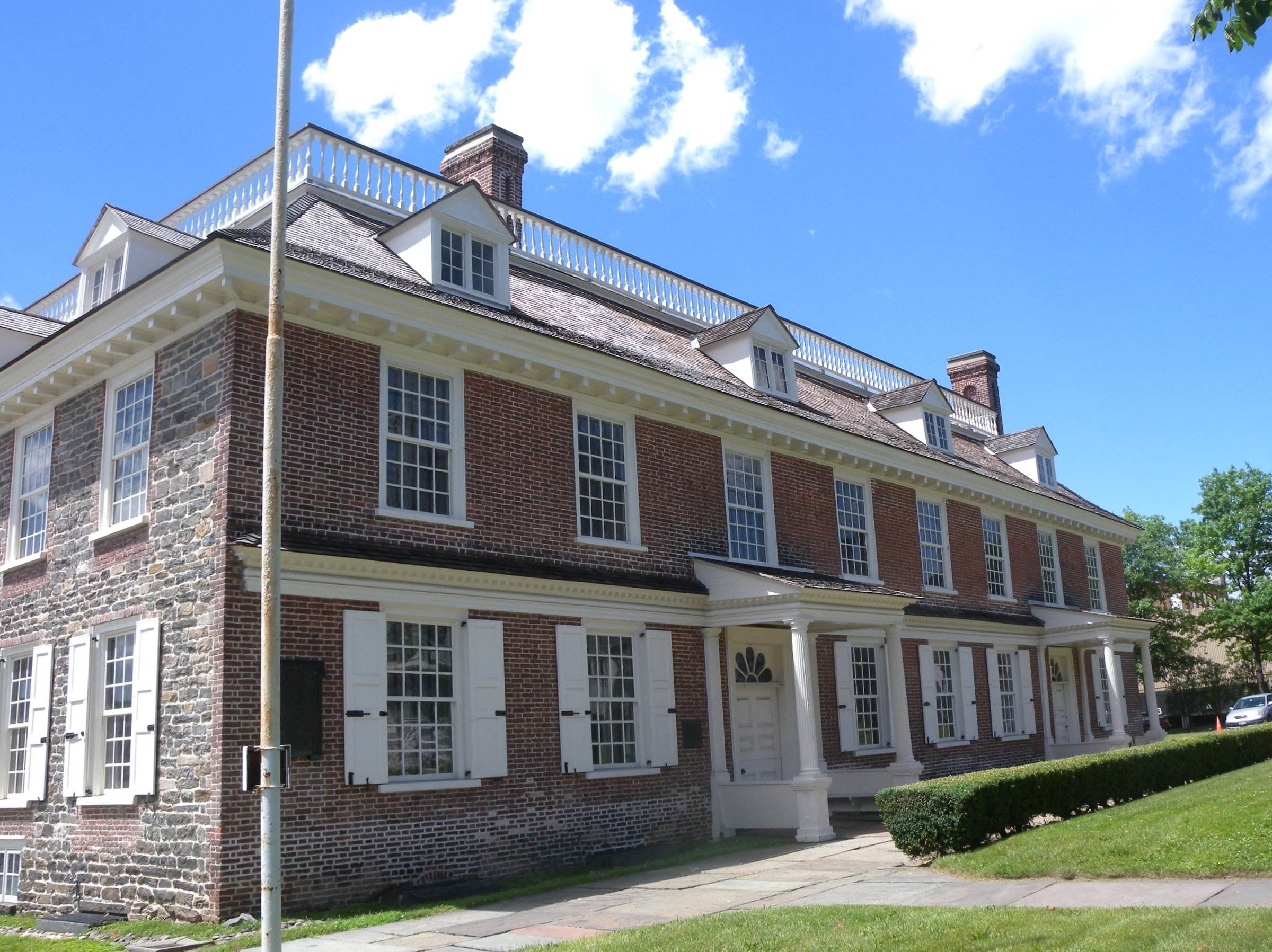
Philipse Manor Hall in Yonkers

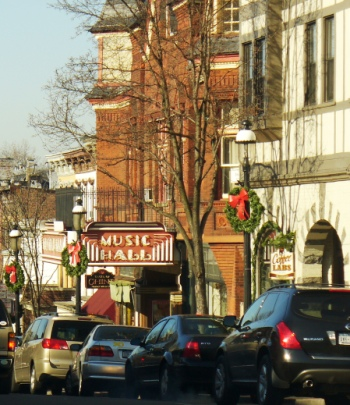
Tarrytown Music Hall on Main Street

Culturally, Westchesterites hold a strong sense of county identity.

=== Historic sites ===
The Timothy Knapp House, built around 1670, is the oldest standing building in Westchester. Philipse Manor Hall and the Old Dutch Church of Sleepy Hollow are also among the oldest, built around 1682 and 1685 respectively. Philipse Manor Hall is located in Getty Square, Yonkers, and is operated by the New York State Office of Parks, Recreation and Historic Preservation.

Current National Historic Landmarks in the county are:

- The Aaron Copland House
- The Armour-Stiner House
- The Boston Post Road Historic District which includes the Jay Estate and Rye Golf Club
- The Elephant Hotel
- The John Hartford House
- The John Jay Homestead
- The John William Draper House
- Kykuit
- Lyndhurst
- Old Croton Aqueduct
- Old Dutch Church of Sleepy Hollow
- Philipse Manor Hall
- Philipsburg Manor House
- Playland
- St. Paul's Church (Note: Was designated a National Historic Site in 1942. The original church, a wooden structure known as Church of Eastchester, was built in 1695. The present-day stone church was completed in 1764, and its name was changed to St. Paul's in 1795. The church property, which is operated by the National Park Service, includes a cemetery with burial stones dating to 1704 and the remnants of a village green that was the site of what came to be known as the "Great Election" of 1733. The publisher of the New York Journal, John Peter Zenger, wrote an account of the election and was arrested and tried for seditious libel. His acquittal established the legal precedent for freedom of the press, which was later incorporated as a basic freedom in the U.S. Bill of Rights.)
- Stepping Stones
- Sunnyside
- Thomas Paine Cottage
- Van Cortlandt Manor
- Villa Lewaro

The former Edwin H. Armstrong House is the only delisted National Historic Landmark in Westchester.

=== Libraries ===
Westchester County is served by the Westchester Library System, established in 1958. The system comprises 38 public libraries and 25 college and special libraries in the county. The Westchester Library Association is an organization which advocates on behalf of libraries and their personnel and support systems within Westchester County.

=== Other attractions ===
- Caramoor Center for Music and the Arts, Katonah
- Donald M. Kendall Sculpture Gardens, Purchase
- The Emelin Theatre, Mamaroneck
- The Hudson River Museum, Yonkers
- The Jacob Burns Film Center, Pleasantville
- Katonah Museum of Art, Katonah
- Neuberger Museum of Art, Purchase
- New Roc City, New Rochelle
- Teatown Lake Reservation, Ossining
- Westchester Jazz Orchestra, Chappaqua
- Westchester Philharmonic, White Plains
- Westchester County Center, White Plains
- Mianus River Gorge, Bedford

=== African American history ===
Westchester County's African American Heritage Trail was created in 2004; new sites are added to the Trail periodically.

== Government ==
The Westchester County Government is currently headed by the County Executive Ken Jenkins, who won a special election to finish the term of George Latimer who resigned on January 2, 2025 in order to be sworn in as U.S. representative of New York's 16th Congressional District. The district attorney is Miriam E. Rocah, and the County Clerk is Timothy C. Idoni. All three are Democrats.

=== Board of Legislators ===
The Westchester County Board of Legislators is the legislative branch of Westchester County. Currently, there are fifteen Democrats, one Republican, and one Conservative who caucuses with the Republicans. The current chair of the board is Vedat Gashi.

=== Politics ===
Since the 1990s, Westchester County has become a political blue wall. The Republican nominee for U.S. president last won a majority in 1988.

United States presidential election results for Westchester County, New York
Year	Republican		Democratic		Third party(ies)	
Year	No.	%	No.	%	No.	%
1884	11,286	46.08%	12,525	51.13%	683	2.79%
1888	13,799	46.81%	14,948	50.71%	732	2.48%
1892	13,456	43.21%	16,088	51.67%	1,595	5.12%
1896	19,337	59.62%	11,752	36.23%	1,345	4.15%
1900	21,256	54.89%	16,439	42.45%	1,032	2.66%
1904	25,101	55.93%	18,093	40.32%	1,685	3.75%
1908	29,438	58.38%	18,346	36.38%	2,638	5.23%
1912	15,843	29.50%	21,160	39.40%	16,708	31.11%
1916	34,693	59.43%	22,457	38.47%	1,230	2.11%
1920	76,020	68.28%	28,060	25.20%	7,255	6.52%
1924	85,029	63.91%	30,964	23.28%	17,042	12.81%
1928	109,939	56.22%	80,926	41.39%	4,679	2.39%
1932	112,747	51.07%	101,435	45.94%	6,606	2.99%
1936	133,670	51.10%	123,561	47.24%	4,338	1.66%
1940	182,883	62.27%	110,114	37.49%	694	0.24%
1944	174,635	61.71%	107,591	38.02%	756	0.27%
1948	177,077	60.93%	95,681	32.92%	17,853	6.14%
1952	237,105	67.38%	113,358	32.21%	1,454	0.41%
1956	271,906	72.17%	104,857	27.83%	0	0.00%
1960	224,562	56.61%	171,410	43.21%	691	0.17%
1964	149,052	37.90%	243,723	61.98%	460	0.12%
1968	201,652	50.31%	173,954	43.40%	25,201	6.29%
1972	262,901	62.83%	154,412	36.90%	1,122	0.27%
1976	208,527	54.26%	173,153	45.06%	2,616	0.68%
1980	198,552	54.38%	130,136	35.64%	36,461	9.99%
1984	229,005	58.67%	160,225	41.05%	1,078	0.28%
1988	197,956	53.36%	169,860	45.78%	3,192	0.86%
1992	151,990	40.12%	184,300	48.65%	42,550	11.23%
1996	123,719	35.87%	196,310	56.92%	24,834	7.20%
2000	139,278	37.46%	218,010	58.63%	14,525	3.91%
2004	159,628	40.33%	229,849	58.08%	6,293	1.59%
2008	147,824	35.79%	261,810	63.39%	3,410	0.83%
2012	143,122	36.84%	240,785	61.99%	4,540	1.17%
2016	131,238	31.20%	272,926	64.88%	16,491	3.92%
2020	144,731	31.30%	312,437	67.57%	5,196	1.12%
2024	167,795	36.65%	287,434	62.78%	2,609	0.57%

Historically, Westchester County had been a classic "Yankee Republican" county. It supported Republican presidential candidates in all but two elections from 1896 to 1988. The only exceptions were 1912, when the GOP was divided between William Howard Taft and Theodore Roosevelt, and 1964, when Lyndon B. Johnson won a national landslide and swept every county in New York. As a measure of how Republican the county was for years, it was one of the few counties where Franklin D. Roosevelt of neighboring Dutchess County was completely shut out in all four of his campaigns for president.

However, it swung Democratic in the early 1990s—much like other New York City suburbs. In the most recent national elections, Westchester voters tended to be far more Democratic than the national average. In fact, Westchester, after New York City and Albany County, has produced the biggest margins for statewide Democrats in recent years. Democratic voters are mainly concentrated in the more populated southern and central parts of the county. More than 63 percent of Westchester County voters voted for Barack Obama in the 2008 presidential race, the seventh-highest percentage of any New York county.

Currently, Westchester County is represented in the U.S. House by Republican Mike Lawler and Democrat George Latimer. Lawler's district covers most of the county's northern half. It also includes all of Rockland and Putnam Counties and a portion of Dutchess. Latimer's district includes most of the southern half of the county, including Yonkers, Mount Vernon, White Plains, New Rochelle and Rye along with a sliver of the Bronx.

Additionally, Republicans remain competitive with Democrats in state and local elections. For instance, it voted for Republican George Pataki, by a margin of 23.07% against Democratic candidate, Carl McCall in the gubernatorial race of 2002, and by 26.22% in 1998. Pataki hails from Westchester; he previously served as mayor of Peekskill and represented part of the county in the state Assembly and state Senate prior to being elected governor.

In 1998, County Executive Andrew Spano became just the second Democrat to hold the post in at least a half-century. In 2006, county legislator Andrea Stewart-Cousins defeated 20-year incumbent Nicholas Spano for a seat in the New York State Senate in a rematch of the 2004 race, which she had lost by only 18 votes. His brother, Assembly Member Mike Spano, switched parties in July 2007 to become a Democrat. District attorney Janet DiFiore also switched parties from Republican to Democratic in August 2007. In 2009, Republican Rob Astorino ousted three-term county executive Andy Spano, who had the endorsement of the New York Conservative Party, winning in a landslide. Astorino became the first Republican county executive since Andrew O'Rourke left the post in 1997. In 2011, the GOP broke the Democratic two-thirds majority in the county legislature by picking up two seats. However, two of the Democrats formed a coalition with the Republicans to control the board, with a Republican becoming vice-chair. In 2017 Democrats gained three seats to take outright control of the board. In 2019 Democrats gained two seats and in 2020 the last remaining Republican switched parties to become a Democrat. As of the 2021 elections the current composition is fifteen Democrats, one Republican and one Conservative.

Voter registration as of April 1, 2016
Party	Active voters	Inactive voters	Total voters	Percentage
Democratic	263,855	26,561	290,416	47.65%
Republican	128,152	12,200	140,352	23.02%
Unaffiliated	129,709	14,297	144,006	23.62%
Other (Note: Included are voters affiliated with the Conservative Party, Green Party, Working Families Party, Independence Party, Women's Equality Party, Reform Party, and other small parties.)	31,460	3,348	34,808	5.71%
Total	553,176	56,406	609,582	100%

Westchester County was the home of U.S. Vice President Nelson Rockefeller, who occupied the Kykuit mansion near the hamlet of Pocantico Hills.

The county is also home to 42nd U.S. President Bill Clinton and Secretary of State Hillary Clinton, who live in Chappaqua. Former First Lady Barbara Bush grew up in Rye.

U.S. President Donald Trump owns a home in Bedford. The 230-acre Seven Springs estate was acquired by Trump in 1996.

== Law enforcement and emergency services ==
There are currently 42 local police agencies located in Westchester County. These agencies frequently work with one another and with other agencies, including county, state, and federal law enforcement agencies responsible for protecting Westchester County.

Westchester County has a wide array of emergency services and is the home to 58 municipal fire departments, one federal fire department, 42 ambulance services, three Haz-Mat teams, a volunteer technical rescue team, a fire academy and a fire investigations unit. Each department has career, volunteer or a combination of personnel. Westchester County Department of Emergency Services operates the main dispatching system for EMS and fire departments, located in Valhalla. The department also provides numerous support services for the various agencies throughout the county.

The Career Chief's Association, a cooperative of career fire departments, also operates the Special Operations Task Force. The force consists of six squad companies that can be rapidly assembled for a major hazardous materials incident, CBRNE event, collapse or confined space rescue, or other incident requiring a large number of HazMat or rescue technicians. Over 700 firefighters, police officers and EMS providers were trained to be part of this effort and serve over half the population of Westchester County including Yonkers, Mount Vernon, New Rochelle, White Plains, Scarsdale, Eastchester, and the Fairview, Hartsdale, and Greenville Fire Departments in the Town of Greenburgh.

== Media ==
County-wide media outlets include:

=== Print ===
- The Daily Voice, a news website for Fairfield and Westchester Counties.
- El Sol, a Spanish news website covering Connecticut and Westchester.
- The Hudson Independent, a monthly newspaper serving Tarrytown, Sleepy Hollow and Irvington.
- The Journal News, a daily newspaper and news website for Westchester, Rockland, and Putnam.
- The Westchester County Press, a print newspaper produced in White Plains, part of the National Newspaper Publishers Association.
- The Westchester Guardian, a print and online newspaper, distributed three days a week.
- The Rivertowns Enterprise, a print and online newspaper covering Hastings-on-Hudson, Dobbs Ferry, Ardsley and Irvington.
- The Scarsdale Inquirer, a weekly newspaper that serves the residents of Scarsdale and Greenburgh.
- El Sentir Hispano Kaffury Latin Magazine, a magazine and website that covers news, culture, lifestyle, nightlife, shopping, and other local information within Westchester, New York. It is published monthly by Today Media
- Westchester Magazine, a magazine and website that covers news, culture, lifestyle, nightlife, shopping, and other local information within Westchester County, New York. It is published monthly by Today Media, LLC, a company located in Rye, NY. Its circulation in 2010 was over 800,000.
- Black Westchester, one of the biggest African-American newspapers in Westchester county.

=== Television and radio ===
- FiOS1 Lower Hudson Valley, a television news station available on Verizon FiOS.
- News 12 Westchester, a television news station.
- WHUD (100.7 FM), a Peekskill station that focuses on the Hudson Valley.
- WRNN-TV, a television news station in Rye Brook.
- WVBN (103.9 FM), a Hartsdale radio station focusing on Westchester.
- WVIP (93.5 FM, formerly known as WRTN), a Whitney Radio-owned New Rochelle radio station with varied programming.
- WVOX (1460 AM), a Whitney Radio-owned New Rochelle radio station with varied programming.
- WXPK (107.1 FM), a White Plains/Briarcliff Manor radio station for music.

== Transportation ==
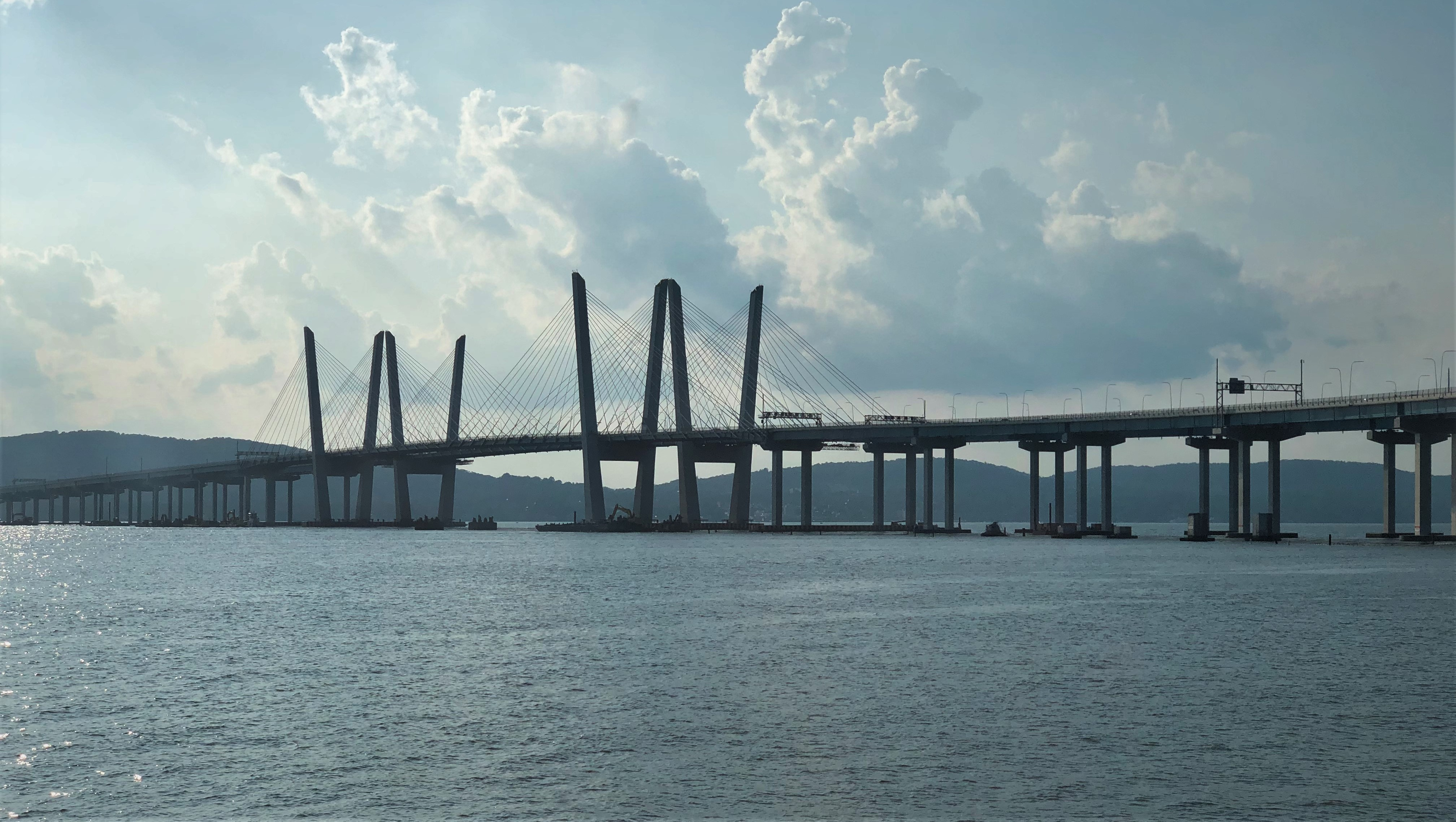
The Tappan Zee Bridge connecting Tarrytown to South Nyack

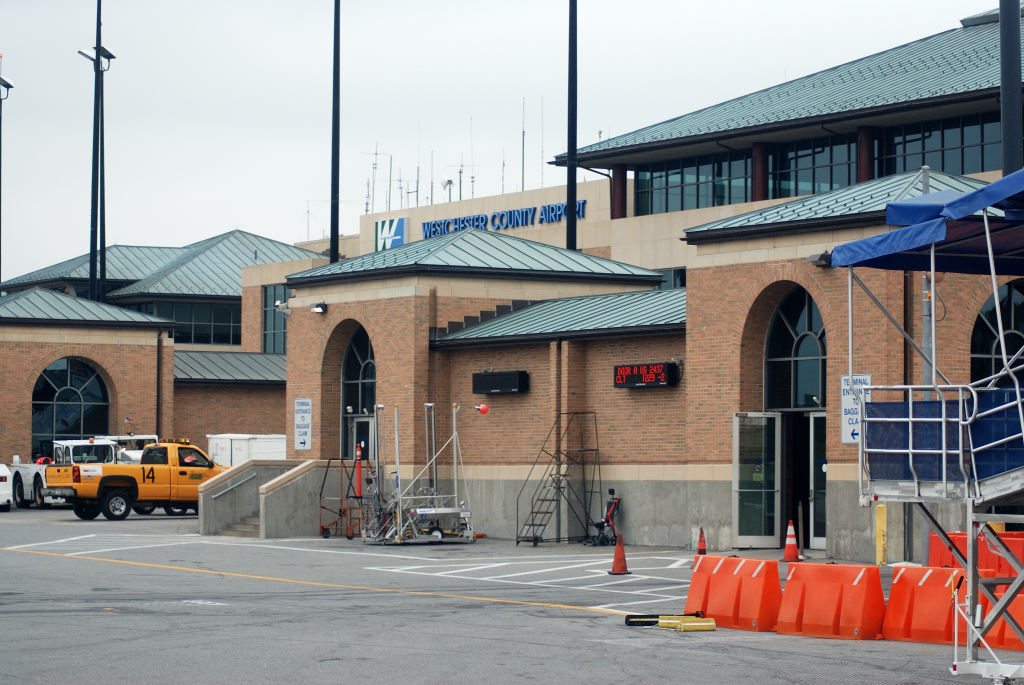
Westchester County Airport near White Plains

The combination of the county's numerous roadways and bridges, proximity to New York City, and the county's large population all lead to substantial traffic enforcement and busy local courts.

Transportation routes have been responsible for the county's development patterns, with city and town growth being most pronounced along these corridors. There are five mostly north–south corridors and three which traverse the county in the east–west direction. The north–south routes are (going from west to east): S. Route 9/Albany Post Rd/Broadway Corridor, the Saw Mill River Parkway Corridor, the Sprain Brook Parkway, the Hutchinson River Parkway, and the I-95/New England Thruway. The east–west corridors are, from south to north: the Cross County Parkway, the Cross Westchester Expressway/I-287, and the U.S. 202 corridor.

=== Major roadways ===
- I-87 / New York Thruway
- I-95
- I-287
- I-684
- US 1
- US 6
- US 9
- US 202
- NY 6N
- NY 9A
- NY 100
- NY 9D
- NY 127
- NY 22
- NY 35
- NY 120
- NY 120A
- NY 125
- Bronx River Parkway
- Cross County Parkway
- Hutchinson River Parkway
- Saw Mill River Parkway
- Sprain Brook Parkway
- Taconic State Parkway

=== Major bridges ===
The Tappan Zee Bridge bridges the Hudson River between Tarrytown in Westchester and South Nyack in Rockland County; costing $4 billion, it was constructed during 2013–2017 to replace an earlier bridge at the same location and was renamed the Governor Mario M. Cuomo Bridge upon its opening. About 20 mi (32 km) upstream, the Bear Mountain Bridge crosses the Hudson between Cortlandt and Orange County.

=== Public transit ===
Westchester County Airport serves the county, and is adjacent to White Plains. Bus service is provided by the Bee-Line Bus System (owned by the Westchester County Department of Public Works and Transportation) within Westchester and to/from the Bronx, Manhattan, and Putnam County. Additionally, the MTA Bus Company runs to and from Getty Square in Yonkers to Midtown Manhattan. The Hudson Link operates express bus routes from city centers and train stations in Tarrytown and White Plains to Nyack, Nanuet, Spring Valley in Rockland County on the opposite side of the Hudson River.

Additionally, NY Waterway operates a water ferry service between Ossining in Westchester and Haverstraw in Rockland County.

==== Railroads ====
Amtrak serves Croton-Harmon, New Rochelle, and Yonkers. Commuter rail service in Westchester is provided by Metro-North Railroad (operated by the Metropolitan Transportation Authority). Metro-North operates three lines in the county; west to east, they are the Hudson, the Harlem, and the New Haven lines. These are former operations of the New York Central and the New York, New Haven and Hartford railroads (and their successors, Penn Central and Conrail), each of which stops in the Bronx between Westchester and Manhattan.

== In popular culture ==
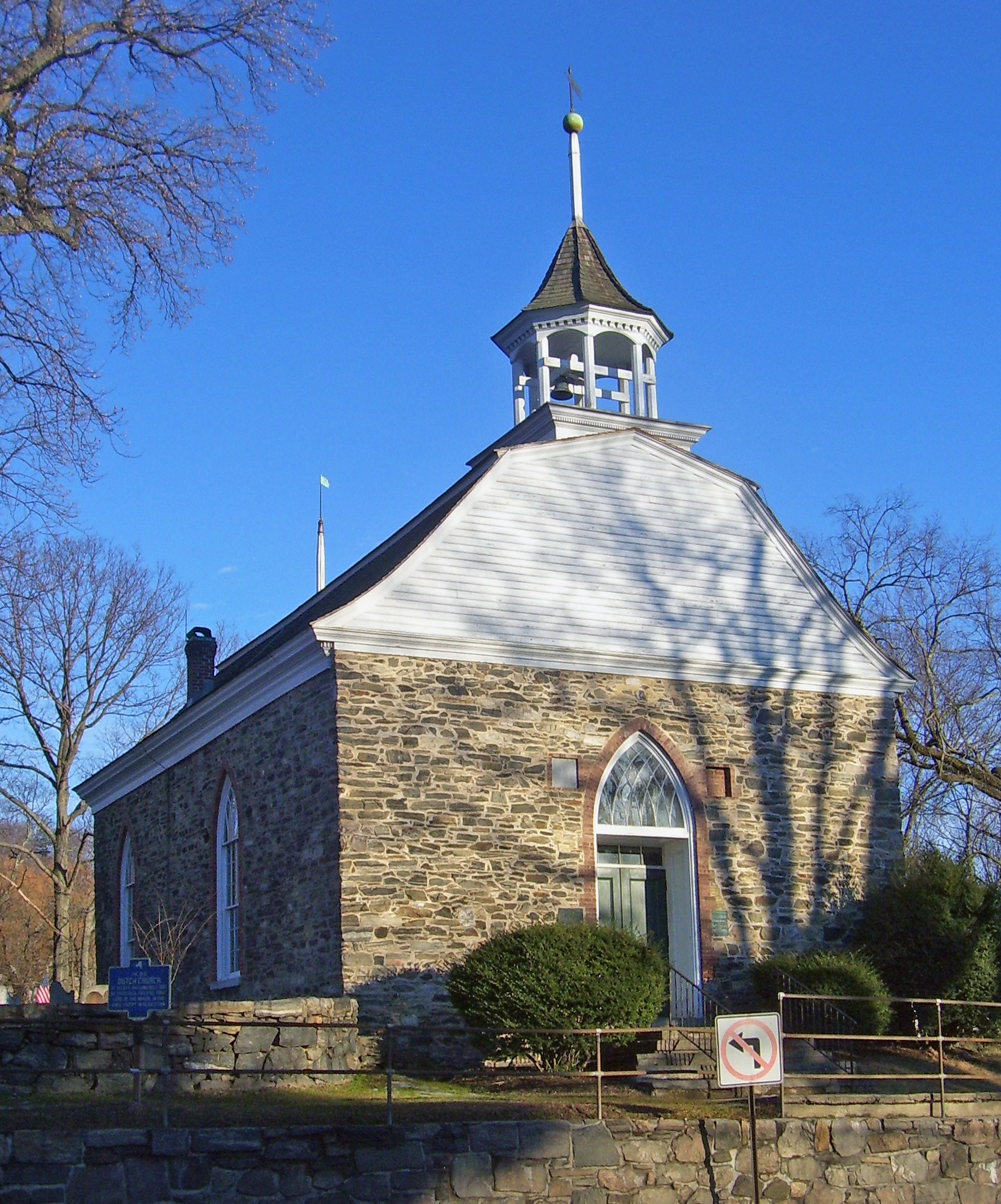
The Old Dutch Church in Sleepy Hollow

Westchester County has been the home of many novelists, including Washington Irving. His most famous work is "The Legend of Sleepy Hollow", which is set at the Old Dutch Church of Sleepy Hollow among other locations in Sleepy Hollow, New York. The story has inspired a variety of works, including the 2013 television series Sleepy Hollow, set in the modern village.

In the X-Men multimedia series, the X-Mansion is located on the Titicus Reservoir, on Graymalkin Lane, outside of Salem Center. At the mansion, Professor Charles Xavier runs the Xavier "School for Gifted Youngsters" to educate mutant children and keeps a headquarters for the X-Men. (Note: "Few heroes enjoy such elaborate bases of operations as Batman and Superman, although the X-Men headquarters is a site to be reckoned with. Marvel Comic's mutant band of superheroes spend most of their time at their mentor Professor X's mansion, located in Westchester County, New York. Xavier's estate houses the X-Men's training facility, which fronts as an Ivy League-like school.")

One of the most successful films shot in the county was the 1988 film Big. While the majority of the film takes place in New York City, the amusement park scenes were filmed in Rye Playland in Westchester.

In print media, the area is a frequent setting of the Nero Wolfe detective stories by Rex Stout, which ran from 1934 to 1975. An early documented mention of Westchester County is in the Trixie Belden series (which ran from 1948 to 1986). The series was set in Sleepyside-on-Hudson, a fictional village in the Hudson Valley. The original author, Julie Campbell Tatham, modeled the fictional Crabapple Farm in Sleepyside after her own home at Wolf Hollow on Glendale Road in Ossining. She also mentioned it in her last work in the series: Cherry Ames, Country Doctor's Nurse. Westchester is the primary setting and residence of the main characters in The Clique young adult novel series by Lisi Harrison. In Edward Lewis Wallant's novel The Pawnbroker, the main character Sol Nazerman lives in Mount Vernon.

In television, an early broadcast media presentation of Westchester County was on The Dick Van Dyke Show (1961–1966), whose main characters live in New Rochelle. Much was made of their suburban setting and Rob's separate world from New York City. The 1970s sitcom Maude was set in Tuckahoe. In the final season of the American sitcom Friends, the characters Monica and Chandler moved from New York City to live in Westchester. In the CBS sitcom How I Met Your Mother, Future Ted and his family live in Westchester. In the AMC show Mad Men, Ossining is home to main characters Don Draper and his family. From season 4, Don lives in Manhattan and Betty lives with Henry Francis and the children in Rye.

The Netflix animated series Big Mouth is set in Westchester County, where its creators Nick Kroll and Andrew Goldberg also grew up.

E. L. Doctorow's novel Ragtime and the subsequent musical adaptation Ragtime: The Musical are both partially set in New Rochelle. The town serves as a setting that represents the affluence of white suburbanites in the early stages of the 20th century.

== See also ==
- Biodiversity of Westchester County, New York
- Downstate New York
- List of counties in New York
- National Register of Historic Places listings in Westchester County, New York
- Southern Westchester
- USS Westchester County (LST-1167)
