= Pound Ridge, New York =

Town in New York state, United States

- Town
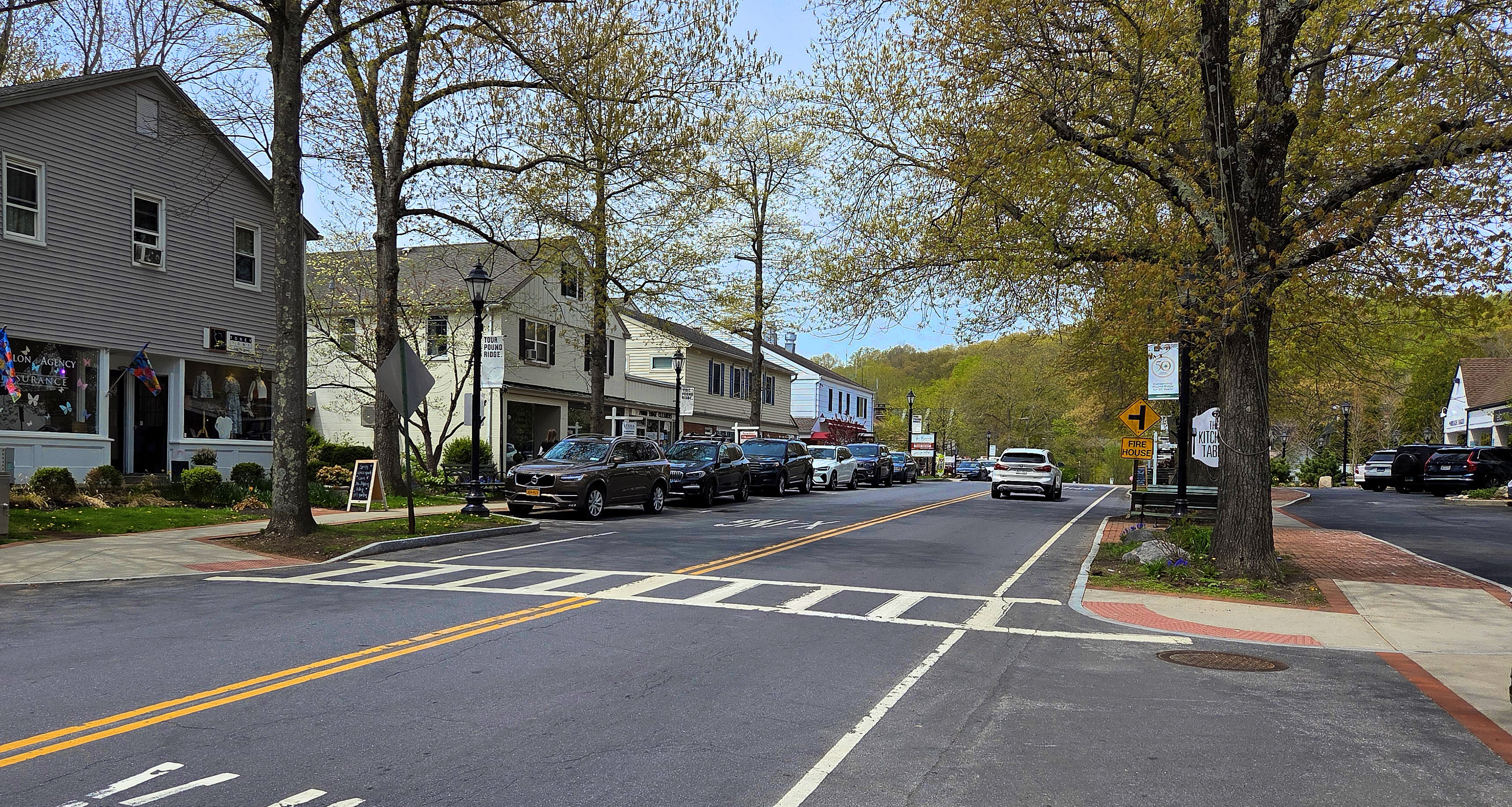
- Westchester Avenue in Scotts Corners, the downtown area of Pound Ridge

- Seal

- Location of Pound Ridge, New York
- Coordinates: 41°12′28″N 73°34′47″W
- Country: United States
- State: New York
- County: Westchester
- Founded: 1788

Government
  - Town supervisor: Kevin C. Hansan

Area
  - Total: 23.09 sq mi (59.80 km^{2})
  - Land: 22.31 sq mi (57.78 km^{2})
  - Water: 0.78 sq mi (2.02 km^{2})
- Elevation: 614 ft (187 m)

Population (2020)
  - Total: 5,082
  - Density: 227.8/sq mi (87.95/km^{2})
- Time zone: UTC−5 (Eastern (EST))
  - Summer (DST): UTC−4 (EDT)
- ZIP Code: 10576
- Area code: 914
- FIPS code: 36-59685
- GNIS feature ID: 0979394
- Website: www.townofpoundridge.gov

Pound Ridge is a town in Westchester County, New York, United States. The population was 5,082 at the 2020 census. The town is located toward the eastern end of the county, bordered clockwise to the north and east by Lewisboro, to the south by New Canaan, Connecticut and Stamford, Connecticut, and to the west by North Castle and Bedford.

While much of the town of Pound Ridge is characterized by sprawling estates and rural landscapes, the hamlet of Scotts Corners serves as the town's "downtown" area. It contains a quarter-mile stretch of businesses along Westchester Avenue, including boutiques, stores, and essential services.

The town’s name is a combination of its physical geography and its early history: the area is characterized by a rugged landscape featuring high ridges, and the "pound" part of the name is credited to the indigenous people who lived in the area and built a "pound"—an enclosure made of saplings driven into the ground—to keep game like deer alive until it was needed for food.

The town's name was commonly spelled as one word, Poundridge, for roughly 250 years before the Town Board officially mandated the two-word spelling in 1948.

== History ==
=== Native Americans ===
In the early 17th century, the Pound Ridge area was inhabited by Native Americans who spoke the Munsee language and were members of the Wappinger Confederacy. The geographical boundaries of the tribes within the Confederacy are unclear. Pound Ridge has been variously listed as within the territory of the Kitchawong, Siwanoy, and Tankiteke bands.

The Siwanoy are generally agreed to have lived along the north Long Island Sound Coast with a maximum range extending from Hell Gate to the Five Mile River separating today's Darien, Connecticut, from Rowayton to its east. The Tankiteke appear to have occupied easternmost Westchester County above the coast but extending further west in the northern part of the county and into southern and eastern Putnam County, and eastward in Fairfield County to the Saugatuck River in Westport. The territory of the Kitchawong is thought to have extended from the Croton River to Anthony's Nose along the Hudson and some distance east from the river.

The Wappinger Confederacy participated in Kieft's War which began in 1640 as a result of escalating tensions over land use, livestock control, trade and taxation between the Dutch West India Company colony of New Netherland and neighboring native peoples. In March 1644, a Wappinger Confederacy village in present-day Pound Ridge was attacked by a mixed force of 130 New Netherland soldiers under the command of John Underhill. This event is now known as the Pound Ridge Massacre. The soldiers surrounded and burnt the village in a night attack killing between 500 and 700 Indians. The dead included 25 members of the Wappinger tribe, with the remainder being either Tankiteke or Siwanoy or both. The New Netherland force lost one man killed and 15 wounded. More casualties were suffered in this attack than in any other single incident in the war. Shortly after the battle, four Wappinger Confederacy sachems arrived in the New England settlement of Stamford to sue for peace.

The territory of modern Pound Ridge was first permanently settled by Europeans in 1718 in the present-day Long Ridge Road area. Long Ridge Road was originally an Indian path and had been used by the first settlers of Bedford, New York, as they traveled to that destination from Stamford. Although the very first settlers were from Huntington on Long Island, most of the original settlers of Pound Ridge were from Stamford. A large portion of Pound Ridge was included in the town of North Castle when it was incorporated in 1721.

=== Grants and patroons ===
Three thousand acres in the northern part of present-day Pound Ridge were included within the more than 86,000-acre (35,000 ha) Cortlandt Manor grant which extended from the Hudson River in the west 20 miles (32 km) east to the Connecticut border. A member of the historically prominent Lockwood family first purchased land in Pound Ridge in 1737 and several members of the family settled in the town within the next six years. The Scofield family first settled in the area in 1745 and the first Fancher settled in the area in 1758. Roads in the modern town bear the name of each of these families. The first record of the term "Old Pound Ridge" to refer to the present-day town's territory is found in the North Castle records from 1737. "Old Pound Ridge" begins to appear in Stamford records in 1750. The name "Old Pound Ridge" is thought to have originated from the presence of an Indian game pound on a hill within the territory when the settlers first arrived.

During the 1700s, the Boutonville area of Pound Ridge found itself at the center of a 50-year land dispute concerning overlapping grants of the Van Cortlandt Manor grant to Stephanus Van Cortlandt and to the Stamford patentees. After a lengthy legal battle, clear title to the 3,000 acres (1,200 ha) was finally given to Van Cortlandt heirs in 1788. Most of this land is now part of the Ward Pound Ridge Reservation. Sometime after that, Pierre Van Cortlandt built a home there. In 1815, Samuel Piatt (Peatt) (1773–1850) purchased 7 acres (2.8 ha) and an existing house from Gen. Philip Van Cortlandt. This home, since demolished, was on what now is Honey Hollow Road. The farmland in the Pound Ridge and Lewisboro sections (Ward Pound Ridge Reservation) were part of the Van Cortlandt Manor lands that were divided into "great lots" of about 3,000 acres (1,200 ha) each. These lots were further divided into 300-acre (120 ha) farms.

=== American Revolutionary War: Battle of Pound Ridge ===
The hamlet was the site of a significant skirmish during the American Revolutionary War, which became known as the Raid on Poundridge or the Battle of Poundridge (in modern sources, Battle of Pound Ridge). On July 2, 1779, a force of 300 Continental Army troops and members of the local militia was attacked by 200 British soldiers under the command of Banastre Tarleton. The raid was the first independent command for the 24-year-old Tarleton. The attack was planned as one of a series of raids on rebel forces in the region, the purpose of which was to draw Washington's army away from the Hudson River.

The local Patriots had been warned of an impending raid on the night of June 30 by the spy Luther Kennicutt. However, the spy was not able to discover the date of the attack. The American force consisted of 100 Continental Army foot soldiers of the 6th Connecticut Regiment under Major Eli Leavenworth, 90 of Colonel Elisha Sheldon's 2nd Continental Light Dragoons, and about 100 local militia under Major Ebenezer Lockwood. The light horse detachment had been under the temporary command of Major Benjamin Tallmadge until the day before the attack when Colonel Sheldon arrived. Benjamin Tallmadge had organized the Culper Spy Ring, which operated in British-occupied New York. The British force consisted of 200 mounted light dragoons and infantry and included some Hessian Jägers.

Tarleton left his base on the Bronx River near Yonkers on the night of July 1 in a heavy rain storm and rode until he reached North Castle early on July 2. He then decided to attack Pound Ridge by an indirect northern route. In this way he managed to avoid the force of continentals located on the southern road. A lookout spotted the British as they approached the town and warned Colonel Sheldon. The commander dispatched Major Tallmadge with a small group to find out if the arriving force were British or expected reinforcements under the command of Colonel Moylan. The force under Tallmadge withdrew upon contact with the British. The force of light horse and militia under Sheldon and Lockwood were scattered and withdrew to the south. The British pursued them for a time before returning to the town. They were then fired upon by some militia from behind cover. Tarleton's troops burned the Presbyterian Church and the home of Major Lockwood before withdrawing with prisoners, cattle, arms, equipment and the battle standard of Sheldon's 2nd Regiment back along the northern road to Bedford. The British left the cattle in Bedford before returning to the Bronx River camp under pursuit by the Americans as far as North Castle. In the course of the raid the British had managed to capture the regimental standard of the 2nd Continental Light Dragoons as well as some of Benjamin Tallmadge's papers, including a letter from George Washington. These papers revealed information on the operations of the Culper Spy Ring.

Reports on battle casualties are contradictory. One secondary source provides a figure of 10 Americans wounded and eight captured along with two British killed and four captured. The nearby towns of Bedford and Norwalk were burned by the British on July 11. Throughout the Revolutionary War, the region, which was part of a notorious no man's land between the opposing armies known as the ''Neutral Ground," was witness to raids by both Patriots and Loyalists against opposing residents. A Loyalist raid in Pound Ridge in 1779 led to the death of a resident. Pound Ridge held a number of Loyalists as prisoners or under house arrest throughout the war. Later in the war Loyalists were denied freedom of speech, lost the use of the courts, were prevented from practicing their trades, and eventually had their property confiscated.

=== 19th century ===
Pound Ridge was officially incorporated in 1788. In 1782, the population was 707 which increased to 1,062 by 1790 and 1,256 by 1800. One slave is listed as a resident in the 1800 and 1820 federal censuses. In 1830, the population was 1,437. The population remained between 1,400 and 1,500 through the census of 1860, after which the census indicates population decline. During this period Pound Ridge was an agricultural community in which families raised a variety of crops for their own consumption. Commercial beef and dairy farming were also practiced. The town was a center for shoemaking with almost 150 families listed as shoemakers. Shoe parts were acquired from Connecticut factories in Long Ridge and New Canaan. Residents would then stitch, fit and attach the parts and return the completed shoes to the factories. This activity was greatest in the winter during which farmers had the time to pursue secondary occupations. This cottage industry declined as the shoemaking industry began to employ full-time workers around mid-century. As a result, a number of local shoemakers moved out of town to become factory workers. Pound Ridge became a center of basketmaking, with 80 families employed in the trade at its peak. Basketmaking was concentrated in the present-day hamlet of Scotts Corners which was known as Basket Town. Baskets were used for a variety of purposes but were particularly important for the oyster industry along the Long Island Sound. This local industry reached its height in the 1860s, with basket prices falling thereafter. The decline of basketmaking in Pound Ridge was caused by a combination of competition from foreign and machine-made products as well as the collapse of the oyster industry in the Sound due to environmental pollution.

Pound Ridge furnished 109 men to fight in the American Civil War. Of the 94 new recruits, 53 served in Connecticut regiments and 41 in New York regiments. Seven men were killed in action, 13 died of disease, three died in prison, seven were wounded, and 13 disabled. When conscription was enacted, the town began to raise money to give to conscripts for their personal use or so that they could purchase substitutes. The money was raised through taxes, bonds, and loans from the county. By the end of the war, the town had $35,000 in debts. A significant portion of the money was entrusted to Alsop Hunt Lockwood who served as the town supervisor from 1844 to 1853 and then county sheriff for three years before becoming supervisor again from 1856 to 1868. In the spring of 1868, the town attempted to audit the supervisor to determine how the war funds were disbursed. The supervisor resigned in the summer of 1868, and the town went to court against him to recover $9,155.77 in damages and costs. The case was apparently settled out of court. The former supervisor sold his Pound Ridge house in 1871 and moved to White Plains where he died three years later. Alsop was the sixth and last member of the Lockwood family to serve as town supervisor.

In 1869, the Stamford Water Company purchased land for the construction of a dam and the creation of a reservoir for the use of the city of Stamford, Connecticut. Three ponds were joined to create Trinity Lake which reached a capacity of 450 million gallons when the dam height was increased in 1895. In 1891, the Stamford Water Company purchased additional land and created Siscowit Reservoir with a capacity of 88 million gallons. Annual farmers' picnics were held on the eastern shore of Trinity Lake for about 20 years from 1886 onwards. Up to 2,000 people from the region would attend.

=== 20th century and beyond ===
The population of Pound Ridge declined from 1,417 in 1860 to a low of 515 in 1920. During this period general farming was replaced by dairy farming. Forest grew back over land cleared during the previous two centuries. The town had lost all three of its post offices by 1903. In May 1911, a series of fires broke out that burned hundreds of acres. George Irving Ruscoe served as town supervisor from 1894 to 1927. He also served as a justice of the peace for 62 years until his retirement in 1945. In 1916, the Northern Westchester District Nursing Association requested permission to open a Polio hospital in Pound Ridge. Sentiment in the town was strongly against the proposal and the hospital was not approved. The town board passed a resolution requiring all outside children under the age of 17 to be examined by health officials before they would be allowed to visit the town. In 1917, Pound Ridge was caught up in a Polio epidemic.

In 1925, Westchester County purchased over 4,000 acres (1,600 ha) of land in northern Pound Ridge and adjacent Lewisboro to create the Pound Ridge Reservation, the largest park in Westchester County. The park was renamed the Ward Pound Ridge Reservation in 1938 after the park planner and longtime Republican county leader William L. Ward. From 1933 to 1940, the Reservation was host to a Civilian Conservation Corp camp known variously as Camp SP-9, Camp No. 24 and Camp Merkel after the parks superintendent for Westchester County. The camp had about 200 enrollees at any one time. Workers improved roads and built bridges, planted trees and constructed shelters, picnic areas, walls, latrines and a museum.

In the 1930s, entrepreneur and philanthropist Hiram Halle purposefully revitalized the town to attract artists and "bohemian" residents, realizing the advantages of its unique combination of extreme isolation and proximity to Manhattan. Since then, Pound Ridge has become home to many prominent actors and other high-profile individuals who prefer to live unobtrusively.

== Geography ==
According to the United States Census Bureau, the town has a total area of 23.1 square miles (60 km^{2}), of which 22.3 square miles (58 km^{2}) is land and 0.8 square miles (2.1 km^{2}) (3.37%) is water.

The eastern and southern town lines are along the border with Connecticut.

Local topography is characterized by a rugged landscape featuring high ridges, steep cliffs, and rock outcroppings. Within the Ward Pound Ridge Reservation, the terrain includes ridges that reach up to 800 feet high.

Pound Ridge remains one of the most rural and physically isolated communities in Westchester County, largely because its rocky, uneven topography made it difficult to build major highways or railroads.

== Demographics ==
Historical population
| Census | Pop. | Note | %± |
|---|---|---|---|
| 1790 | 1,062 | | — |
| 1800 | 1,266 | | 19.2% |
| 1810 | 1,249 | | −1.3% |
| 1820 | 1,359 | | 8.8% |
| 1830 | 1,437 | | 5.7% |
| 1840 | 1,407 | | −2.1% |
| 1850 | 1,486 | | 5.6% |
| 1860 | 1,471 | | −1.0% |
| 1870 | 1,194 | | −18.8% |
| 1880 | 1,034 | | −13.4% |
| 1890 | 830 | | −19.7% |
| 1900 | 823 | | −0.8% |
| 1910 | 725 | | −11.9% |
| 1920 | 515 | | −29.0% |
| 1930 | 602 | | 16.9% |
| 1940 | 806 | | 33.9% |
| 1950 | 1,234 | | 53.1% |
| 1960 | 2,573 | | 108.5% |
| 1970 | 3,792 | | 47.4% |
| 1980 | 4,009 | | 5.7% |
| 1990 | 4,550 | | 13.5% |
| 2000 | 4,726 | | 3.9% |
| 2010 | 5,104 | | 8.0% |
| 2020 | 5,082 | | −0.4% |
U.S. Decennial Census

As of the census of 2000, there were 4,726 people, 1,699 households, and 1,406 families residing in the town. The population density was 207.3 inhabitants per square mile (80.0/km^{2}). There were 1,868 housing units at an average density of 81.9 units per square mile (31.6 units/km^{2}). The racial makeup of the town was 95.54% White, 1.21% African American, 0.06% Native American, 1.65% Asian, 0.02% Pacific Islander, 0.32% from other races, and 1.21% from two or more races. Hispanic or Latino people of any race were 2.45% of the population.

There were 1,699 households, out of which 38.0% had children under the age of 18 living with them, 76.4% were married couples living together, 4.8% had a female householder with no husband present, and 17.2% were non-families. Of all households 13.2% were made up of individuals, and 5.2% had someone living alone who was 65 years of age or older. The average household size was 2.77 and the average family size was 3.03.

In the town the population was spread out, with 26.1% under the age of 18, 3.4% from 18 to 24, 25.6% from 25 to 44, 32.6% from 45 to 64, and 12.2% who were 65 years of age or older. The median age was 42 years. For every 100 females, there were 96.1 males. For every 100 females aged 18 and over, there were 95.9 males.

The median income for a household in the town was $183,208, and the median income for a family was $191,439 (since 2008). Males had a median income of $100,000 versus $50,553 for females. The per capita income for the town was $74,914. About 0.9% of families and 1.7% of the population were below the poverty line, including 0.6% of those under aged 18 and 2.8% of those aged 65 or over.

== Government ==
- Kevin C. Hansan, town supervisor
- Diane Briggs, deputy supervisor
- Nicole Engel, chief of staff

Pound Ridge government offices are located in the Pound Ridge Town House at 179 Westchester Avenue.

== Schools ==
The local school is the Pound Ridge Elementary School, one of five K-5 schools in the Bedford Central School District. Older children take the bus to the Fox Lane Campus in Bedford, where the middle and high school are located.

== Communities and locations in Pound Ridge ==
- Pound Ridge – the historic hamlet of Pound Ridge in the center of the town, which contains the Pound Ridge Community Church, the Hiram Halle Memorial Library, the Pound Ridge Museum, and many privately owned Hiram Halle restorations in the Pound Ridge Historic District. It was added to the National Register of Historic Places in 1985.
- Sarles Corners – a hamlet west of Scotts Corners; originally named Taylor's Corner.
- Scotts Corners – a hamlet in the southern part of the town which serves as the business district. This is where the post office and firehouse are located.

== Gallery ==
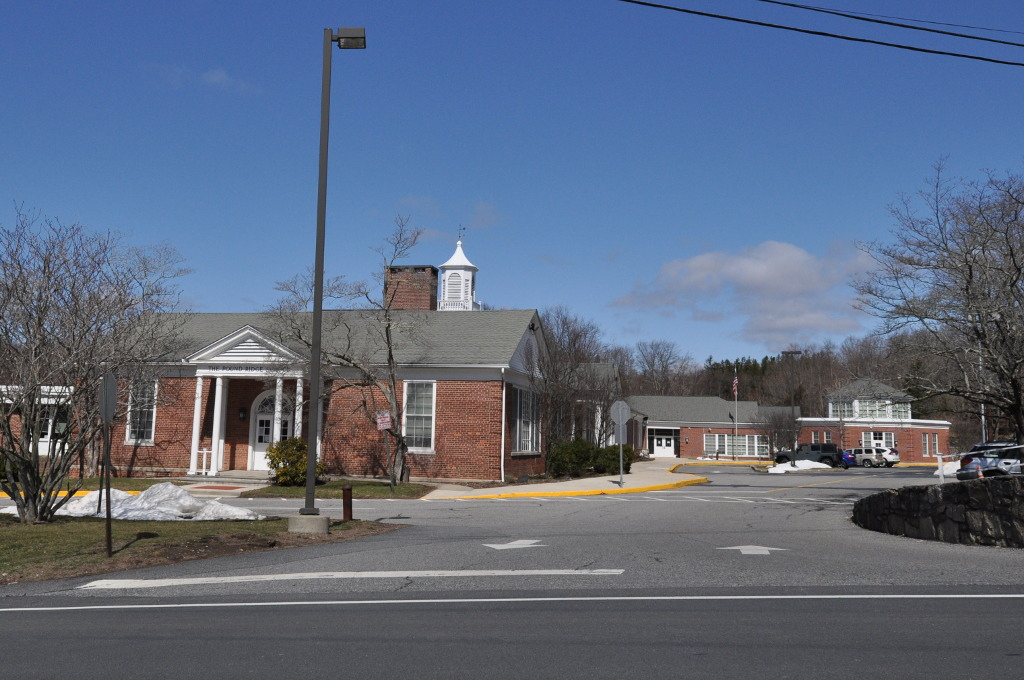
Pound Ridge Historic District

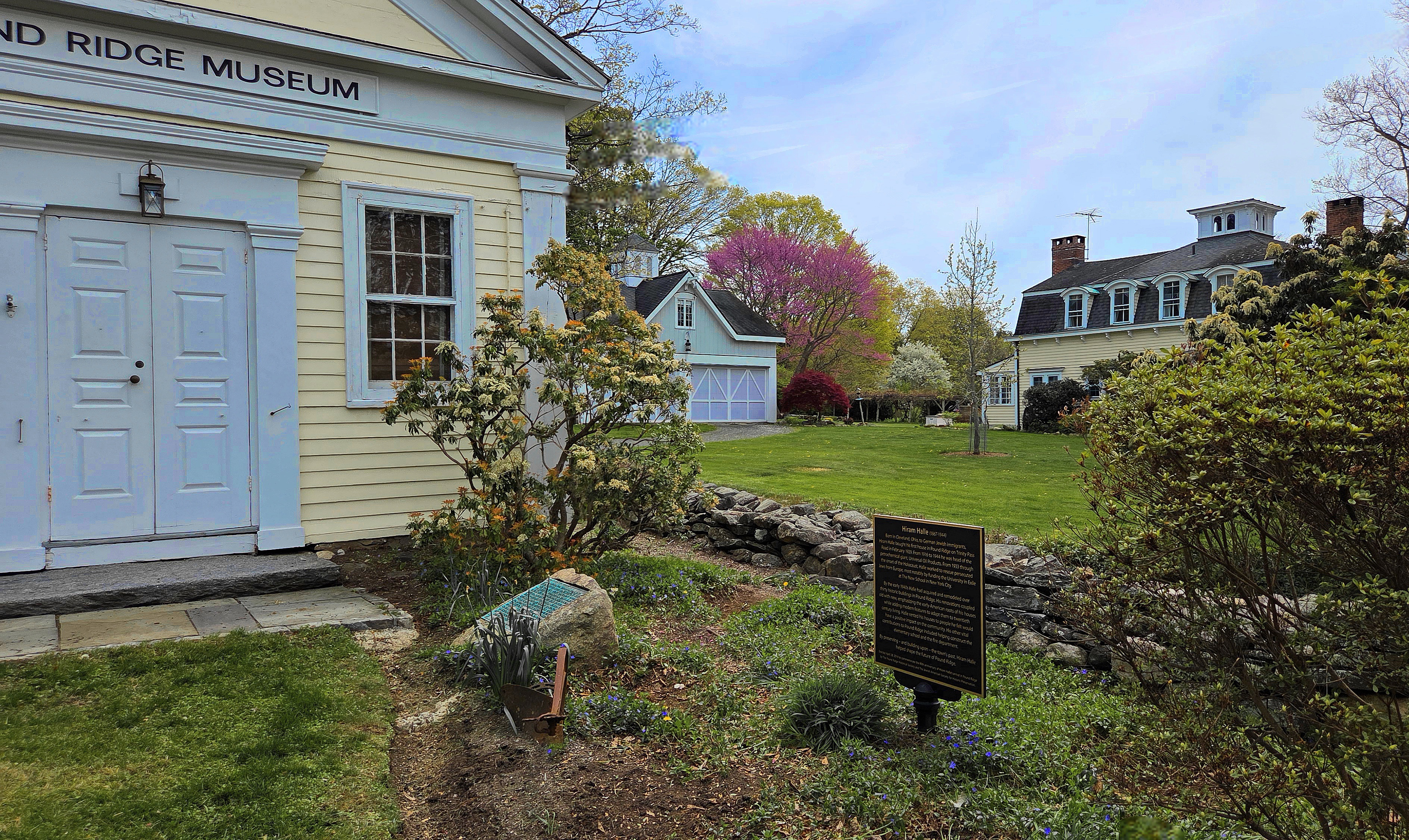
Pound Ridge Museum in the Historic District

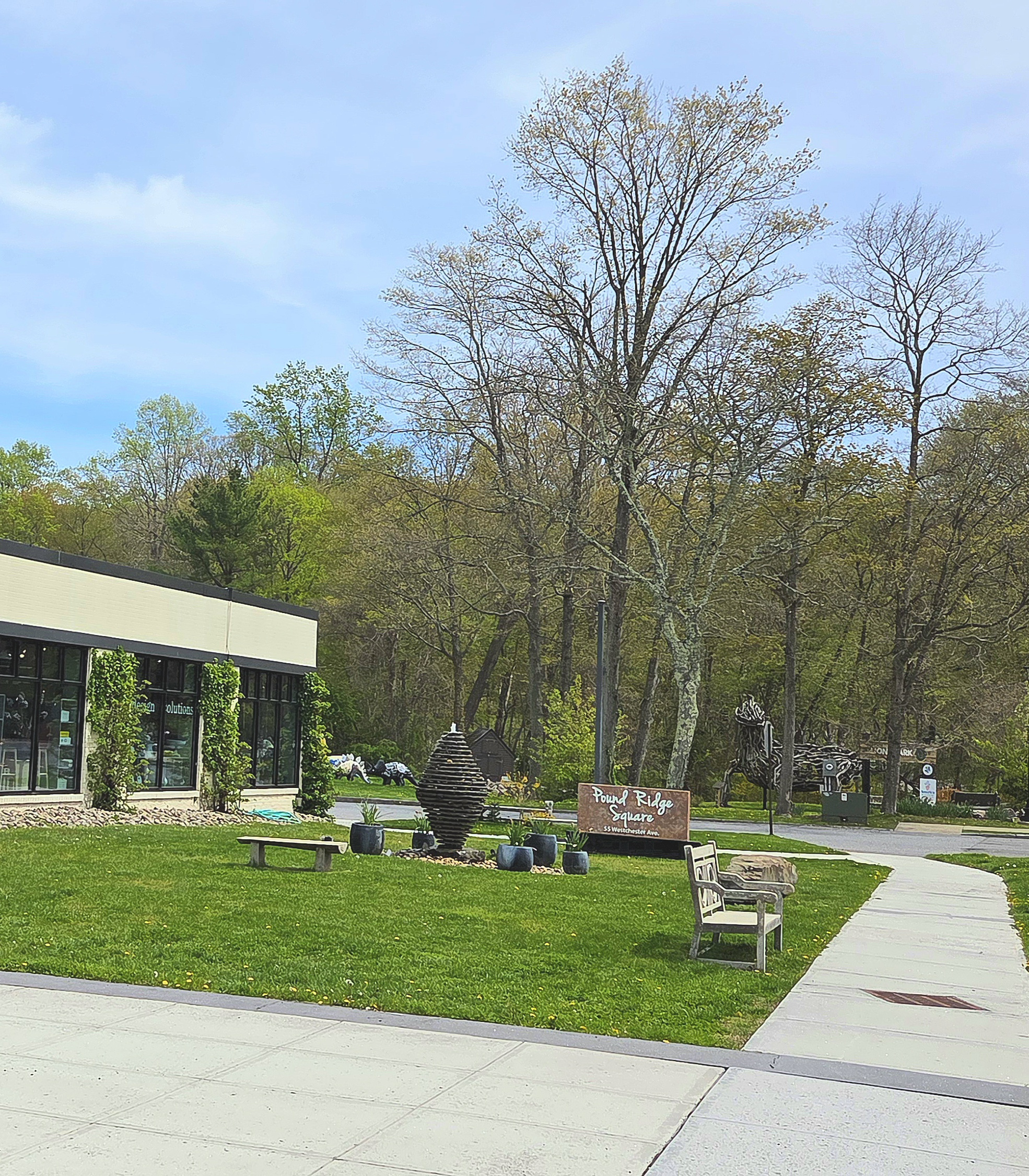
Pound Ridge Square, Scotts Corners

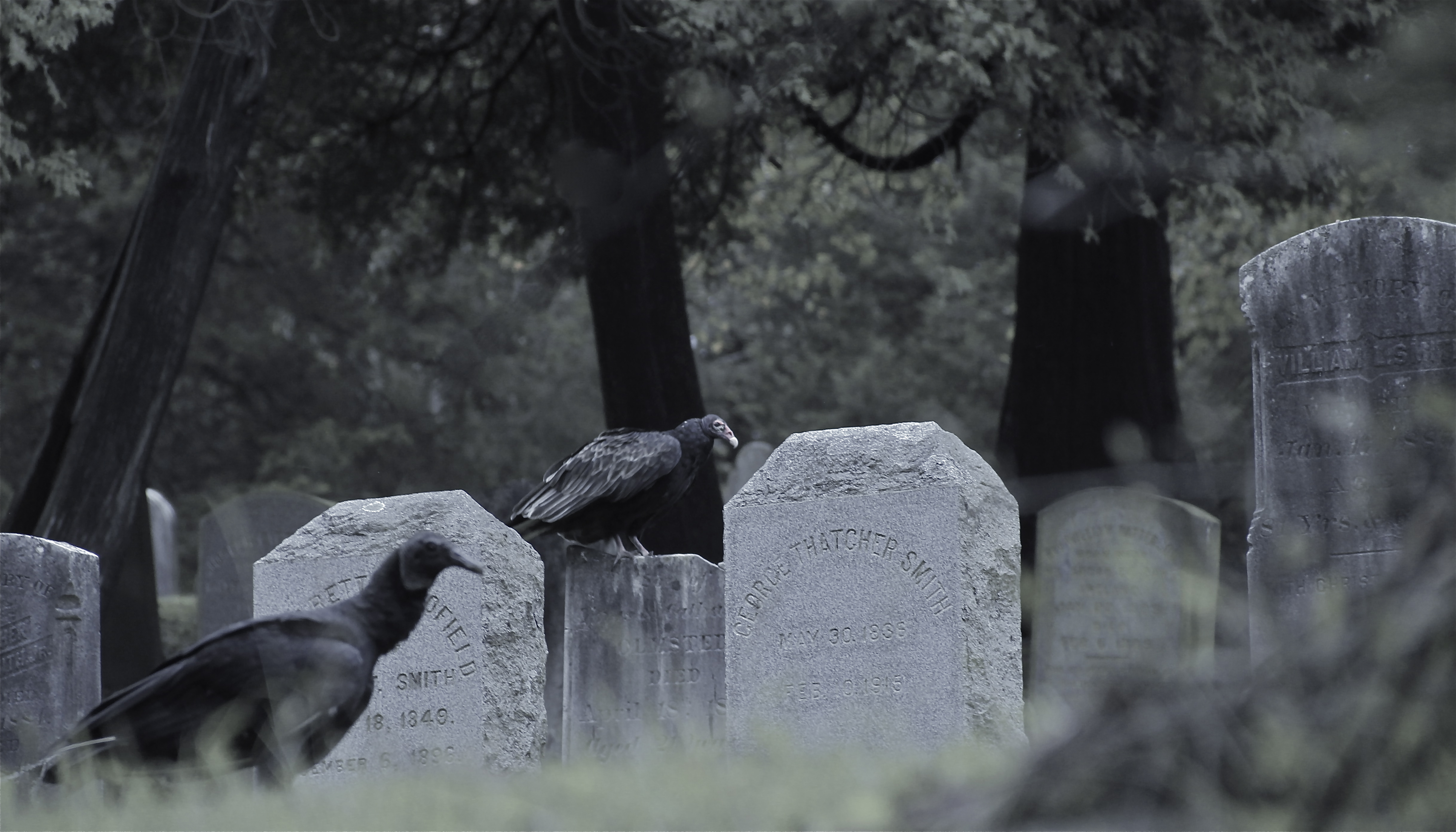
Pound Ridge Cemetery

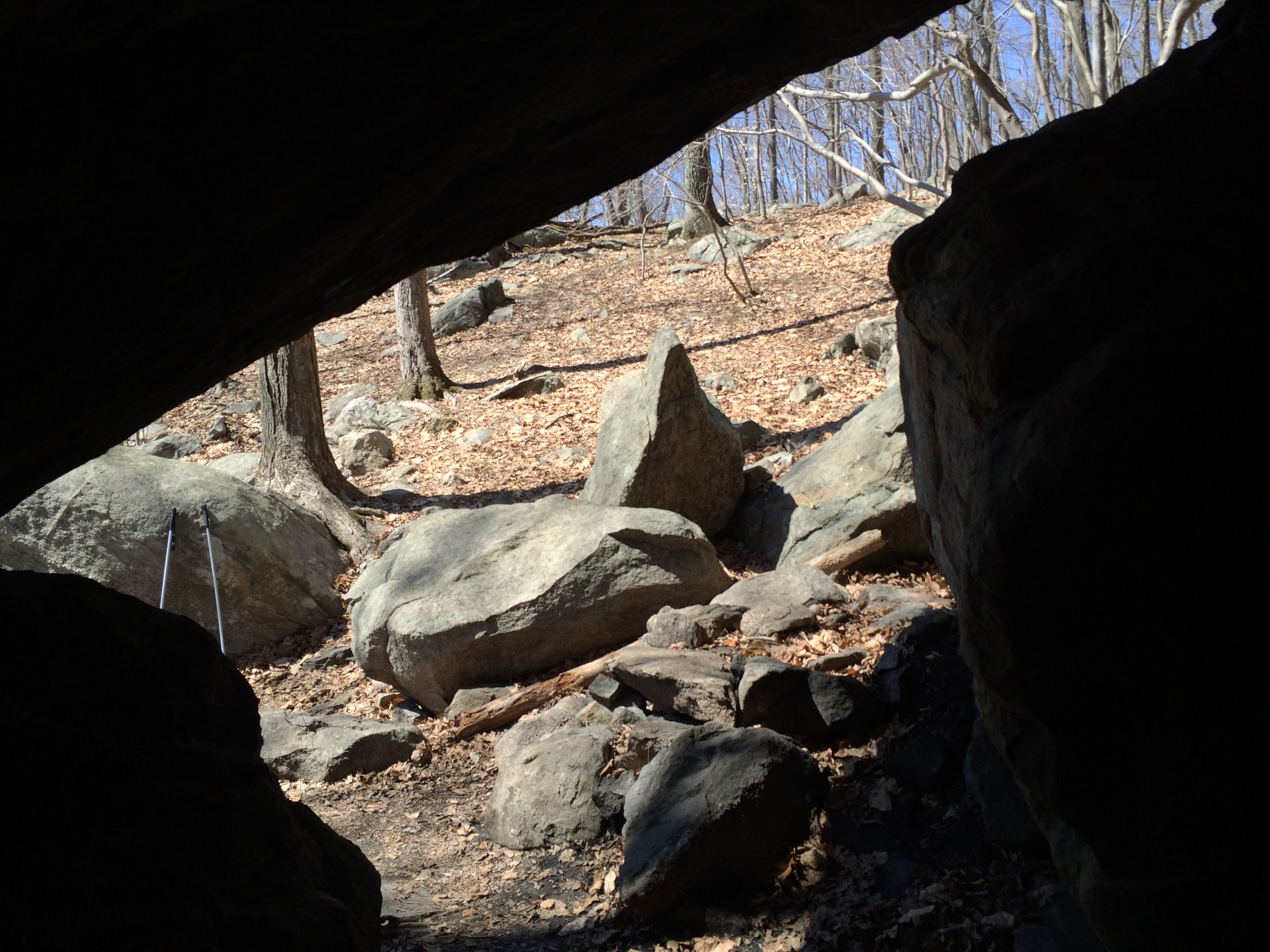
Cave in Ward Pound Ridge Reservation

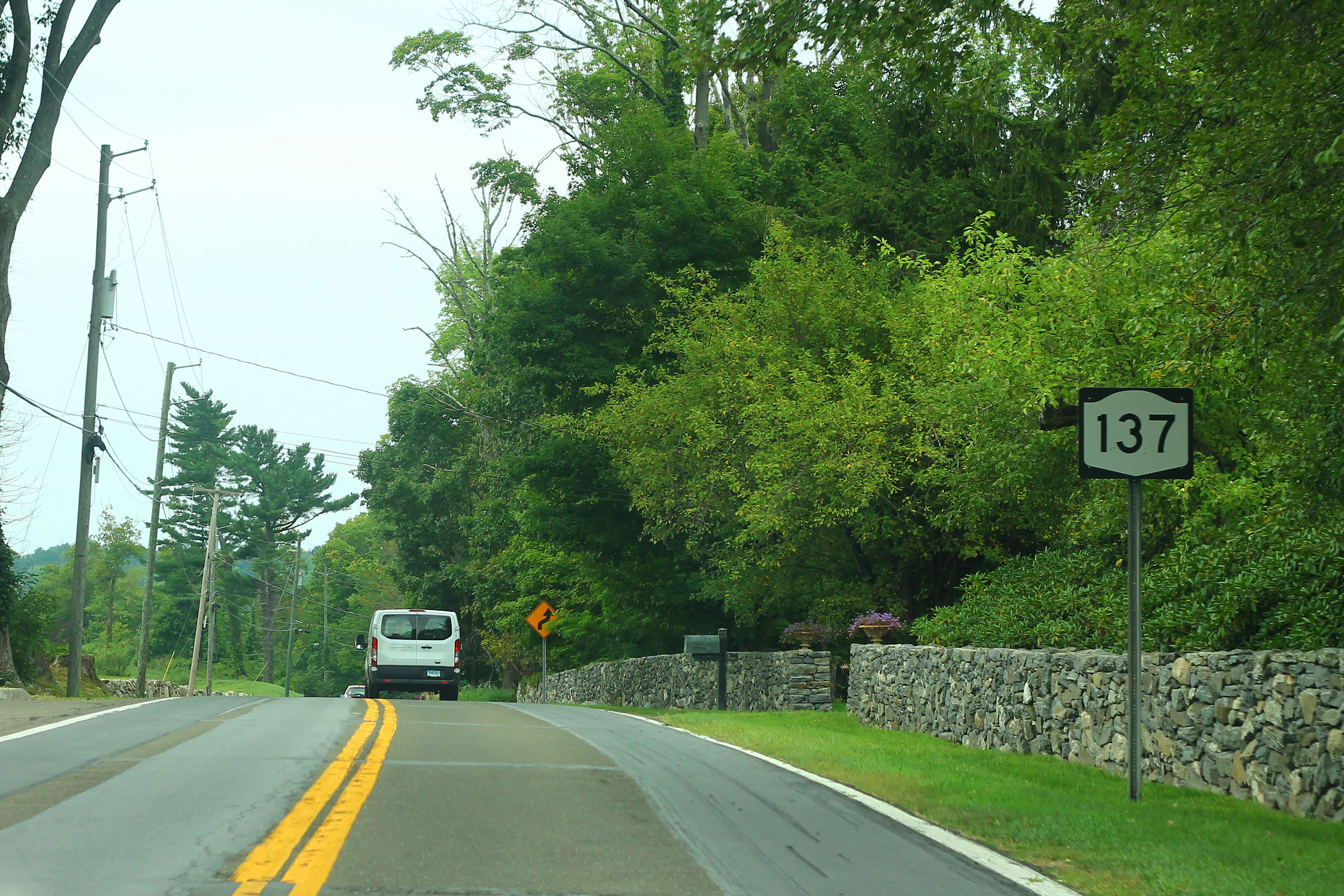
NY State Route 137 in Pound Ridge

== Local media ==
The Recorder is a weekly newspaper serving Pound Ridge and other Northern Westchester communities, including Bedford, Lewisboro, and Mount Kisco.

The Journal News is a daily newspaper.

== Pound Ridge as a film location ==
Pound Ridge and the Pound Ridge reservation were the settings for several films, including:

- 1976 thriller Marathon Man
- 1997 film Jungle 2 Jungle
- 1997 HBO film In the Gloaming

== Notable people ==
- Max Abramovitz (1908–2004), architect and long-time resident; died here
- Eva Amurri (b. 1985), lifelong resident and actress
- Tallulah Bankhead, actress
- Ellen Barkin, actress who lived in town in the 1990s
- David Bloom, journalist
- Jerry Bock, composer and long-time resident
- George E. Bria, journalist
- Tom Brokaw (born 1940), journalist and author
- Blackleach Burritt, noted Congregational clergyman in the American Revolution
- Gabriel Byrne (born 1950), actor; resided here in the 1990s
- Zoe Caldwell, long-time resident and stage actress
- Howard Cosell (1918–1995), sportscaster
- Hume Cronyn, long-time resident and actor; husband of Jessica Tandy
- Melissa Claire Egan (born 1981), actress
- Ari Fleischer (born 1960), press secretary for U.S. President George W. Bush (2001 to 2003); grew up in the town and later returned to raise his family
- Richard Gere (born 1949), actor and producer
- Benny Goodman, jazz clarinetist and bandleader
- Michael Gore, songwriter, producer, and brother of '60s singer Lesley Gore
- Fred Gwynne (1926–1993), actor
- Hiram Halle (1867–1944), philanthropist, inventor, and businessman; died here
- Elizabeth Hand, author; grew up here
- Evan Hunter, aka Ed McBain, author and screenwriter
- Zach Iscol (born 1978), US Marine Corps veteran, entrepreneur, candidate in the 2021 New York City Comptroller election
- Anne Jackson (1925–2016), actress
- Stephen Jenks, composer and singing master
- Eartha Kitt, long-time resident and actress
- Björn Kjellström, one of the inventors of the modern compass and founder of the Silva Compass company, resident from 1950 to 1995
- Andrew Klaber, investor and philanthropist
- Ronnie Lee, Broadway actor, producer, and founder of Group Sales Box Office
- Blake Lively (born 1987), actress and wife of Ryan Reynolds
- Samuel D. Lockwood, 19th-century Illinois politician
- Stanley Lomas, television and advertising pioneer; produced first televised college football game
- Carey Lowell, actress, ex-spouse of Richard Gere
- Ross Lowell (1926–2019), inventor and cinematographer; died here
- Ali MacGraw (born 1939), actress, ex-spouse of Robert Evans and Steve McQueen
- Stuart Ostrow, Broadway producer; resident 1966–1995
- Maggie Q (born 1979), actress and model
- Steve Reich, composer
- Ryan Reynolds (born 1976), actor and husband of Blake Lively
- Tim Robbins, long-time resident, Little League sponsor, and actor
- Steven C. Rockefeller, professor, philanthropist
- Robert Rubin (born 1938), 70th US Treasury Secretary
- Susan Sarandon, long-time resident and actress
- Lisl Steiner, long-time resident and photographer, photojournalist, and filmmaker
- Martin Stone, producer of Howdy Doody and owner of WVIP Radio
- Jessica Tandy, long-time resident and actress, wife of Hume Cronyn
- John Waite (b. 1952), prolific lyricist/balladier, of The Babys and Bad English fame, who wrote many tunes while living here
- Eli Wallach (1915–2014), actor
- Jessica Walter (1941–2021), actress
- Vera Wang (born 1949), lifelong resident and fashion designer
- Robert Whitehead (1916–2002), Canadian theatre producer
- Sloan Wilson (1920–2003), author
