= Scotts Corners, New York =

- CDP
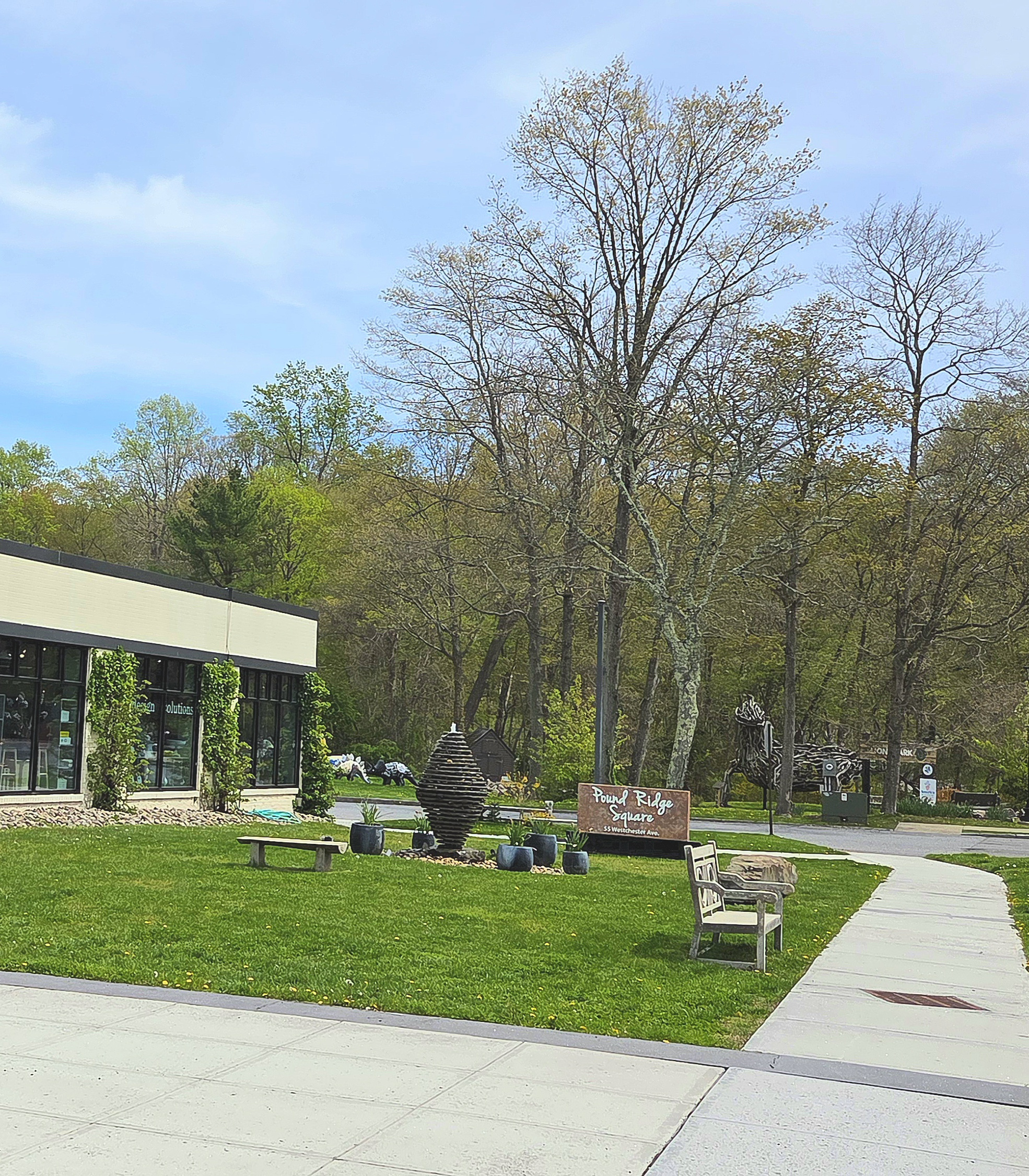
- Pound Ridge Square, Scotts Corners

- Location of Scotts Corners, New York.
- Coordinates: 41°11′21″N 73°33′5″W
- Country: United States
- State: New York
- County: Westchester
- Town: Pound Ridge

Area
  - Total: 1.77 sq mi (4.59 km^{2})
  - Land: 1.77 sq mi (4.59 km^{2})
  - Water: 0 sq mi (0.00 km^{2})
- Elevation: 397 ft (121 m)

Population (2020)
  - Total: 665
  - Density: 375/sq mi (144.8/km^{2})
- Time zone: UTC-5 (Eastern (EST))
  - Summer (DST): UTC-4 (EDT)
- ZIP code: 10576
- Area code: 914
- FIPS code: 36-65948
- GNIS feature ID: 0964692

Scotts Corners is a hamlet (and census-designated place or CDP) located in the town of Pound Ridge in Westchester County, New York, United States. As of the 2020 census, Scotts Corners had a population of 665.

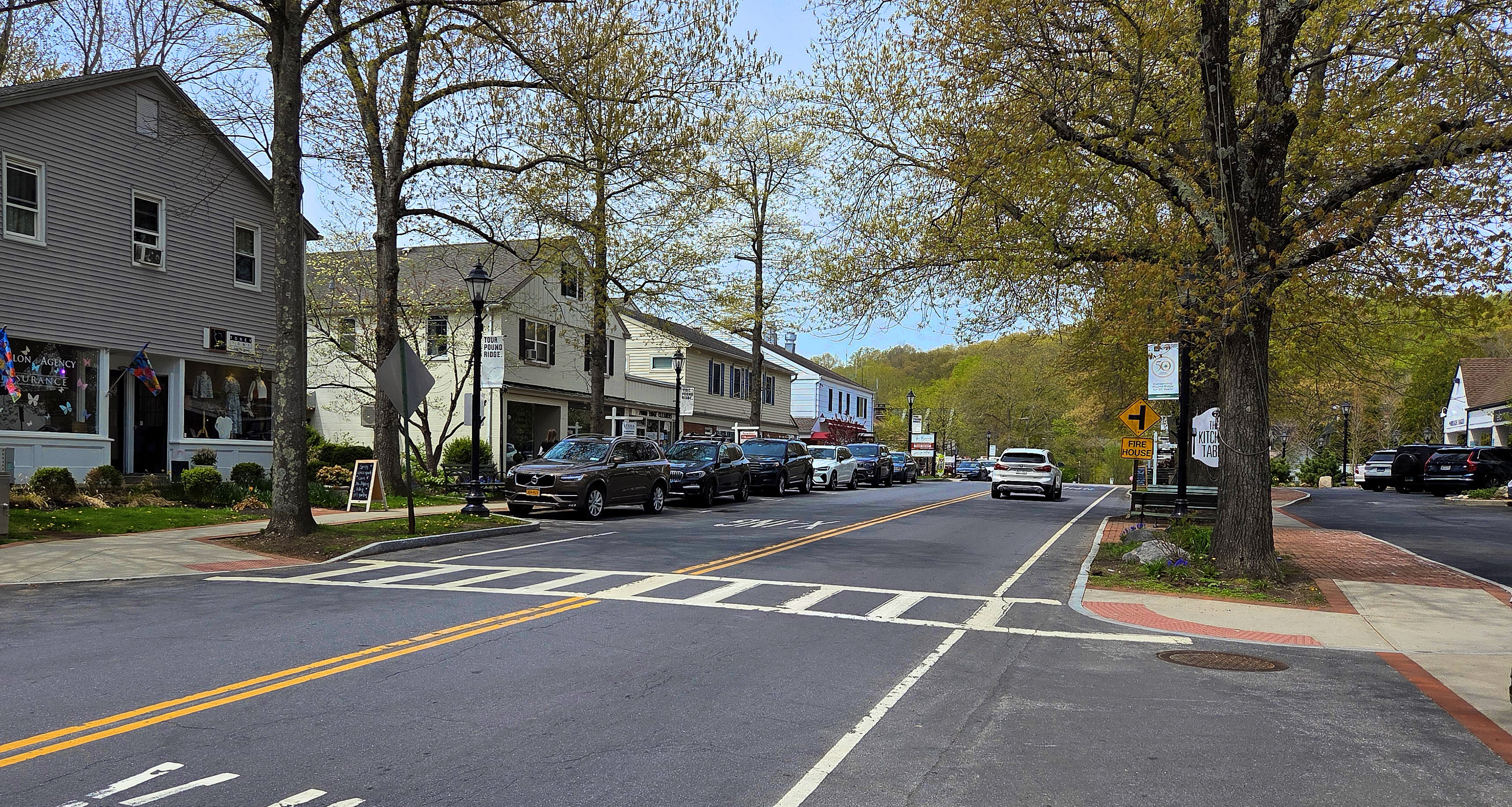
Westchester Avenue in Scotts Corners, Pound Ridge

While much of Pound Ridge is characterized by sprawling estates and rural landscapes, Scotts Corners serves as a dense "downtown" area. It contains a quarter-mile stretch of businesses along Westchester Avenue, including boutiques, stores, and essential services.

Scotts Corners is near the southern town line (the border of Connecticut), east of Sarles Corners.

== Geography ==
According to the United States Census Bureau, the CDP has a total area of 1.8 square miles (4.7 km^{2}), all land.

== Demographics ==
Historical population
Census	Pop.	Note	%±
2020	665		—
U.S. Decennial Census

As of the census of 2000, there were 624 people, 227 households, and 174 families residing in the CDP. The population density was 351.7 inhabitants per square mile (135.8/km^{2}). There were 248 housing units at an average density of 139.8 per square mile (54.0/km^{2}). The racial makeup of the CDP was 95.99% White, 0.80% African American, 1.60% Asian, 0.16% from other races, and 1.44% from two or more races. Hispanic or Latino of any race were 2.08% of the population.

There were 227 households, out of which 35.7% had children under the age of 18 living with them, 70.0% were married couples living together, 5.3% had a female householder with no husband present, and 23.3% were non-families. 18.1% of all households were made up of individuals, and 6.6% had someone living alone who was 65 years of age or older. The average household size was 2.72 and the average family size was 3.10.

In the CDP, the population was spread out, with 25.0% under the age of 18, 4.3% from 18 to 24, 29.6% from 25 to 44, 28.5% from 45 to 64, and 12.5% who were 65 years of age or older. The median age was 41 years. For every 100 females, there were 91.4 males. For every 100 females age 18 and over, there were 96.6 males.

The median income for a household in the CDP was $127,962, and the median income for a family was $154,790. Males had a median income of $93,019 versus $51,579 for females. The per capita income for the CDP was $65,192. None of the families and 1.9% of the population were living below the poverty line, including no under eighteens and none of those over 64.

== Education ==
The school district is Bedford Central School District.
