= Survival in space =

Survival in space may refer to:

- Space and survival, about survival of humanity by space colonization
- Survivability of individuals in space, as described in:
  - Life support system
  - Effect of spaceflight on the human body
