= Pound Ridge Historic District =

Historic district in New York, United States

- U.S. National Register of Historic Places
- U.S. Historic district
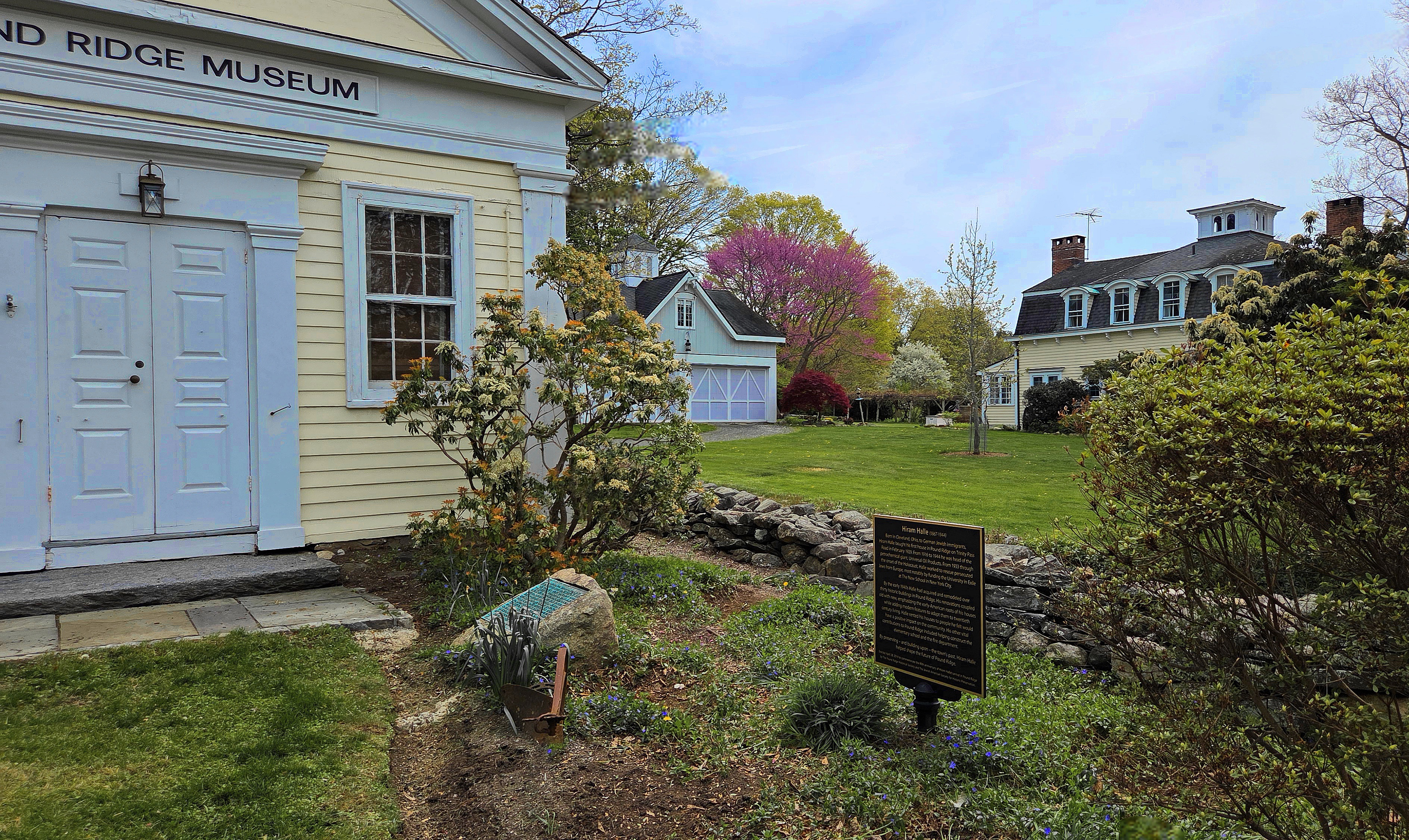
- Pound Ridge Museum in the Historic District

- Location within New York Location within the United States
- Location: Roughly Pound Ridge, Old Stone Hill, and Salem Rds., Trinity Pass and Westchester Ave., Pound Ridge, New York
- Coordinates: 41°12′35″N 73°34′34″W
- Area: 95 acres (38 ha)
- Architect: Halle, Hiram; Et al.
- Architectural style: Colonial Revival, Late Victorian, Mixed (more Than 2 Styles From Different Periods)
- NRHP reference No.: 85003196
- Added to NRHP: December 30, 1985

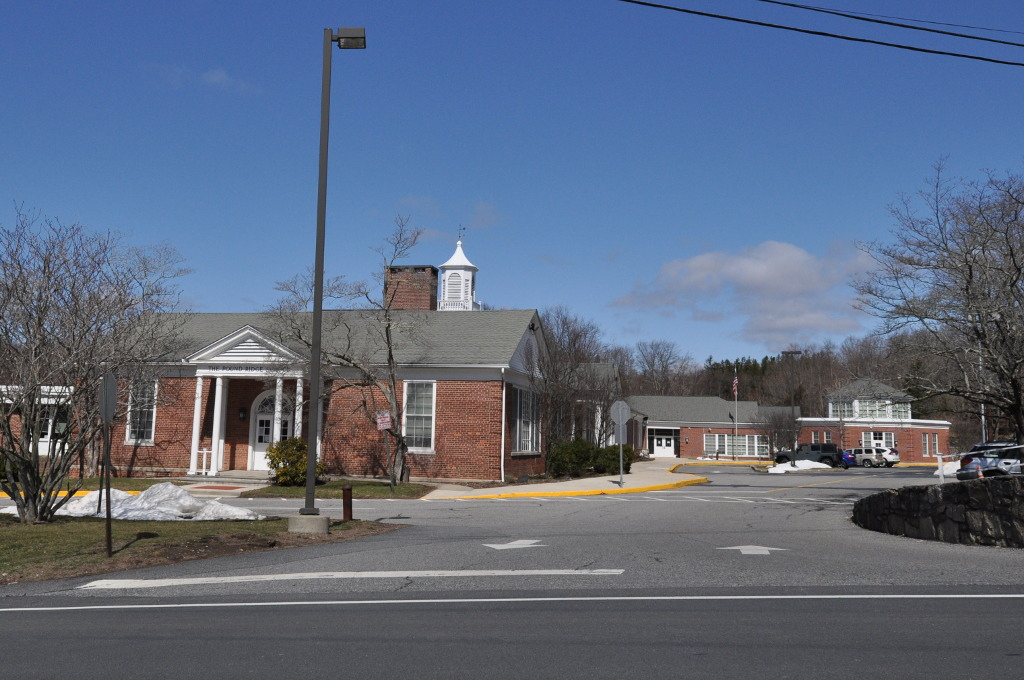

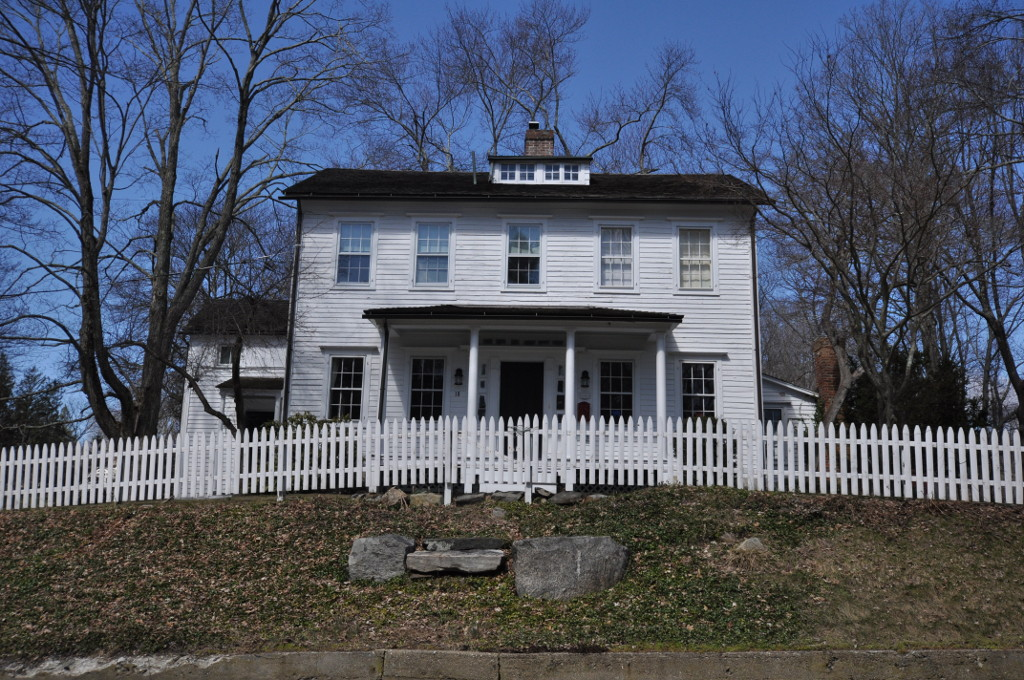

Pound Ridge Historic District is a national historic district located at Pound Ridge, Westchester County, New York. The district contains 46 contributing buildings and encompasses almost all of the hamlet. The majority of the buildings in the district date between 1780 and 1852. The earliest building was built in 1758 and is the Capt. Joseph Lockwood House (only four families have lived in it since Joseph Lockwood build it). Notable buildings include: Methodist Episcopal (Community) Church (1833), Patterson Memorial Presbyterian Church (conant Hall, 1893), Presbyterian Lecture Hall (Pound Ridge Town Hall, 1852), Parker Store (1906), Pound Ridge Village School (Hiram Halle Memorial Library, 1851), Aaron Wood's Mill (ca. 1800), Partridge Thatcher House (1788), Maj. Ebenezer Lockwood House (ca. 1780), Alsop Hunt Lockwood House (1840), and Solomon Lockwood House (ca. 1800).

It was added to the National Register of Historic Places in 1985.

== See also ==
- National Register of Historic Places listings in northern Westchester County, New York
