= Space and survival =

Idea that spacefaring is necessary for long-term human survival

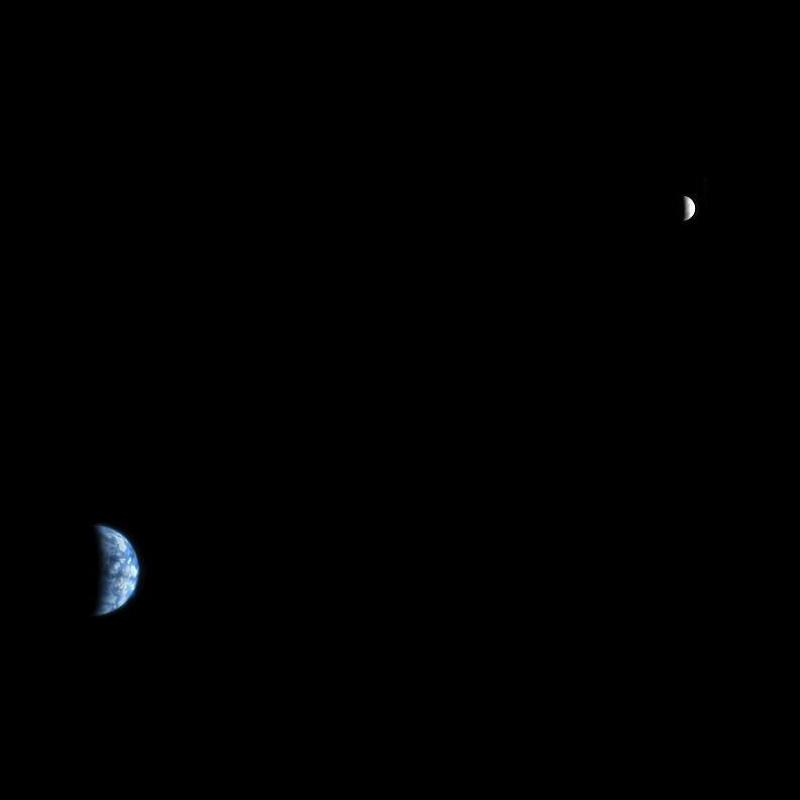
Earth and the Moon viewed from Mars's orbit

Space and survival is the idea that the long-term survival of the human species and technological civilization requires the building of a spacefaring civilization that utilizes the resources of outer space, and that not doing this might lead to human extinction. A related observation is that the window of opportunity for doing this may be limited due to the decreasing amount of surplus resources that will be available over time as a result of an ever-growing population.

The earliest appearance of a connection between space exploration and human survival appears in Louis J. Halle, Jr.'s 1980 article in Foreign Affairs, in which he stated colonization of space will keep humanity safe should global nuclear warfare occur. This idea has received more attention in recent years as advancing technology in the form of reusable launch vehicles and combination launch systems make affordable space travel more feasible.

== Risk to humanity ==
Existential risks are risks of human extinction or similarly severe and irreversible outcome. According to the Future of Humanity Institute, "humanity's long track record of surviving natural hazards suggests that, measured on a timescale of a few centuries, the existential risk posed by such hazards is rather small. The great bulk of existential risk in the foreseeable future is anthropogenic; that is, arising from human activity." Toby Ord argues in The Precipice that some such risks include unaligned artificial general intelligence, pandemics (notably from bioterrorism), catastrophic climate change, and global nuclear warfare. He views these as more likely than natural existential risks, such as from supervolcano eruptions or meteor impacts. Regardless of such risks, the Earth will become uninhabitable in around one billion years due to the gradually brightening Sun, which will require the descendants of today's humans to relocate elsewhere.

== Space settlement ==
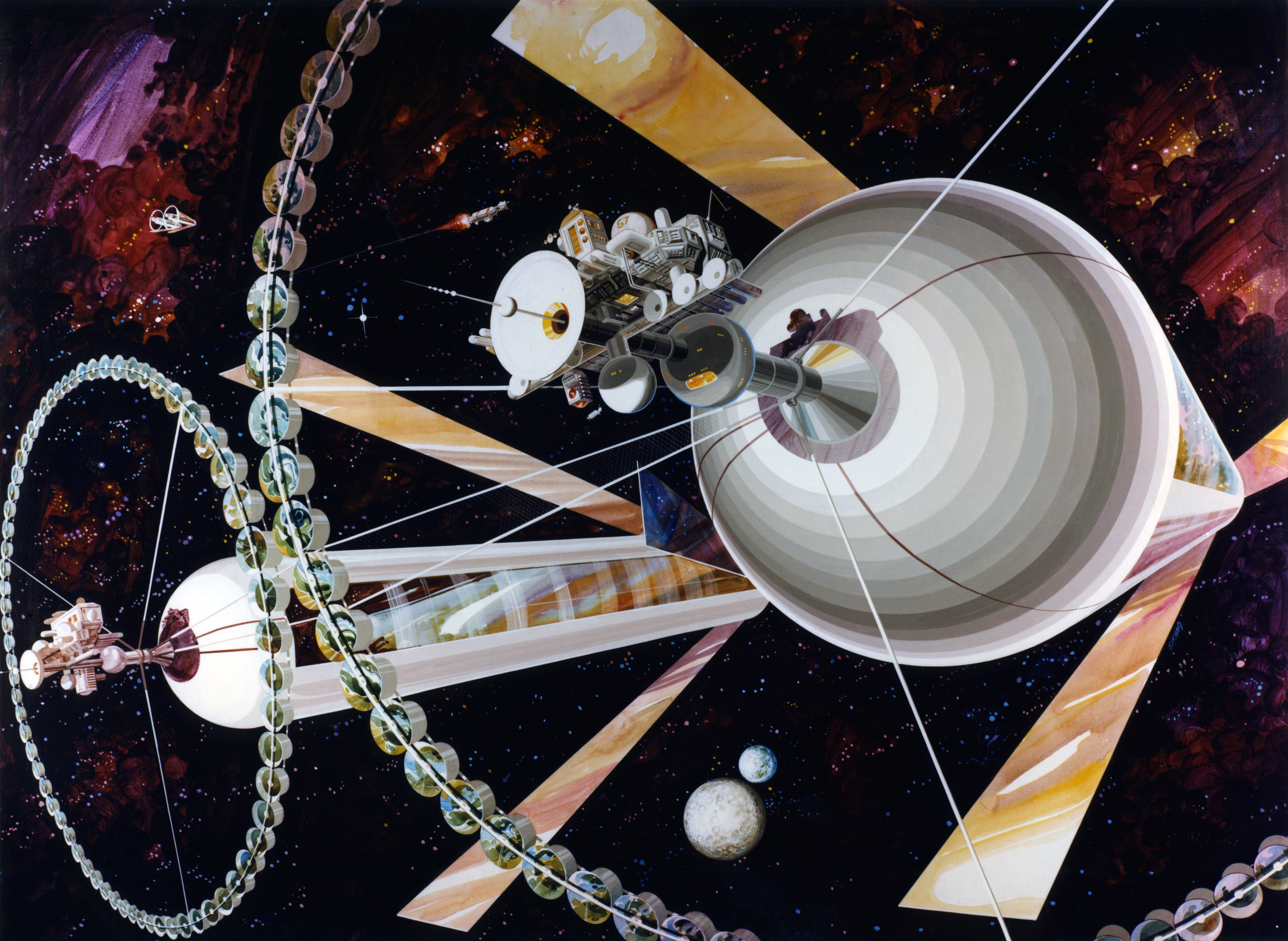
O'neil cylinder's have been considered a potential candidate for long term longevity in space independent from earth

Human extinction can be prevented by strengthening the physical barrier, or increasing the mean distance, between people and the potential extinction event. For example, pandemics are controlled by placing exposed people in quarantine and evacuating healthy people away. The human lineage of genus Homo has reduced from several species co-existing on Earth to just one — all others became extinct before the end of the last Ice age. This illustrates that Homo sapiens is not immune to planetary disaster and that human survival may be better assured through the colonization of space.

Although space colonies do not yet exist, humans have had a continuous space presence since 2000 in the form of the International Space Station. Life-support systems that enable people to live in space may also allow them to survive hazardous events.

=== Multiple locations ===
Expanding the living area of the human species increases the mean distance between humans and any known hazardous event. People closest to the event are most likely to be killed or injured; people farthest from the event are most likely to survive. Increasing the number of places where humans live also helps to prevent extinction. For example, if a massive impact event occurred on Earth without warning, the human species could possibly become extinct; its art, culture and technology would be lost. However, if humans had previously colonized locations outside Earth, the opportunities for the survival and recovery of the species would be greater.

=== Objections ===
Many challenges arise when travelling in outer space. One of the biggest issues that may affect the human body is interstellar radiation. While the Earth's magnetic field and atmosphere protects all living forms on the planet, this cannot be said for outer space. According to researchers from the University of Rochester Medical Center, a radiation equivalent to a mission to Mars can cause serious brain damage such as cognition problems and Alzheimer's disease.

== Space science ==
The observation and study of space protects Earth, as space hazards can be seen in advance and, if discovered early enough, acted against.

=== Near-Earth objects ===
Near-Earth objects (NEOs) are asteroids, comets and large meteoroids that come close to or collide with Earth. Spaceguard is the collective name for some of the efforts to discover and study NEOs, though these efforts are not sufficiently funded.

== Critique ==
Some more contemporary reasons for space as a solution to survival have been identified as imperialist reasoning for space exploration, only relocating collective shortcomings and not solving them.

== See also ==
- Global catastrophic risks – Hypothetical global-scale disaster risk
- Human outpost – Human habitats located in environments inhospitable for humans
- List of microorganisms tested in outer space
- Planetary habitability – Known extent to which a planet is suitable for life
- Space colonization – Concept of permanent human habitation outside of Earth
- Space habitat – Type of space station, intended as a permanent settlement
- Terraforming – Hypothetical planetary engineering process
