= Fox Lane High School =

Public high school in New York state, US

- thumb

Location
- 1674 Broadway; Bedford Corners, New York 10549; United States; 41°11′31″N 73°40′43″W

Information
- Type: Public high school
- Motto: Fox Lane P.R.I.D.E.
- Established: 1956
- Oversight: Bedford Central School District
- Teaching staff: 122.45 (FTE)
- Grades: 9-12
- Enrollment: 1,241 (2022–23)
- Student to teacher ratio: 10.13
- Colors: Red, white
- Yearbook: Fox Trails
- Website: https://flhs.bcsdny.org/

Fox Lane High School is a public high school in Bedford, New York, United States. It is named after the road, Fox Lane, that begins just to the side of the school's driveway. It is a part of the Bedford Central School District.

== Administration ==
The current principal is Dr. Jennifer Amos. There are three assistant principals. Each assistant principal is responsible for half of the students in two grades, and follows them through graduation.

== History ==
The school, designed by the Manhattan-based architectural firm of Moore & Hutchins, opened in 1956.

In recent years the school has undergone several renovations; these include the school's commons and theater in 1990, library in 1993, and cafeteria in 1999. The school has completed a multimillion-dollar renovation that began in the summer of 2005. The entire construction project ended by the start of 2008–2009 school year. The entire campus also renovated the entrances, adding another one on the other side of Route 172, and revamping the older entrance with a traffic circle. Most recently in 2015, the main track and turf field was rebuilt. Shortly after the conclusion of the 2023 baseball season, the old baseball field was torn down and a new turf field began installation.

== Athletics ==
The Fox Lane Foxes teams include football, field hockey, ice hockey, diving, volleyball, soccer, swimming, cross country, winter track, spring track, dance, cheerleading, basketball, skiing, wrestling, lacrosse, ultimate frisbee, softball, baseball, golf and tennis. The Fox Lane Varsity Football team, coached by Andrew Giuliano, faced cross-town rivals Horace Greeley in the 2023 Gridiron cup, and beat Greeley 27-6.

== Notable alumni ==
- Vincent L. Briccetti, federal judge, United States District Court for the Southern District of New York
- Rick Carey, athlete
- Henry Davis, professional baseball player
- Kimya Dawson, musician
- Susan Dey, actress
- Ari Fleischer, White House Press Secretary for U.S. President George W. Bush
- Drew Goodman, Rockies play by play TV broadcaster
- Adam Green, musician
- Chris Harrison, entrepreneur and academic
- Sam Hollander, music producer
- Michael J. Knowles, conservative political commentator and author.
- Roberto Mandje, athlete
- Kate Mara, actress
- Rooney Mara, actress
- Ingram Marshall, composer
- Tim Matheson, actor, Animal House
- John Schneider, actor
- Bitsie Tulloch, actress
- Paul Westcott, radio talk host
- Marissa Jaret Winokur, Tony Award-winning actress
- Trevor Zegras, professional hockey player
