= Lisl Steiner =

American photojournalist (1927–2023)

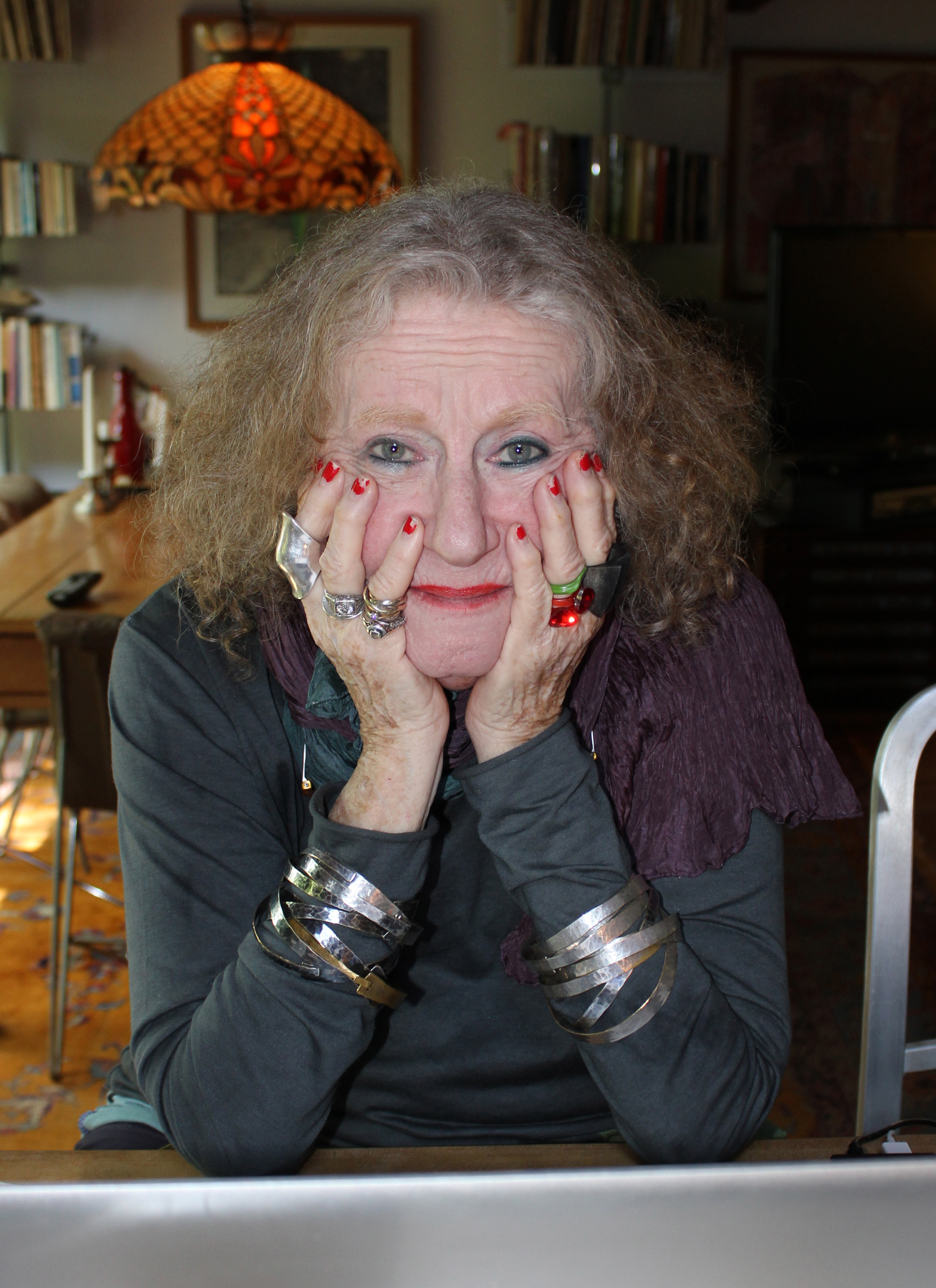
- Steiner in 2013
- Born: November 19, 1927; Vienna, Austria
- Died: June 7, 2023 (aged 95); Pound Ridge, New York, US
- Education: University of Buenos Aires
- Known for: Political and cultural portraits
- Style: Photojournalism
- Spouse: Meyer Monchek (died 1992)
- Website: lislsteiner.com

Lisl Steiner (November 19, 1927 – June 7, 2023) was an Austrian-born American photographer, photojournalist, and documentary filmmaker. She was known for her photographs of political and cultural figures of the 1950s and 60s, including Fidel Castro, Oscar Niemeyer, Louis Armstrong, Jacqueline Kennedy Onassis, Richard Nixon, and Henri Cartier-Bresson.

== Early life and education ==
Steiner was born in a Jewish family in Vienna, Austria, in 1927. Shortly after Adolf Hitler annexed Austria in 1938, she and her family emigrated to Buenos Aires, Argentina. She studied art at the University of Buenos Aires and the Fernando Fader School of Decorative Arts.

== Career ==
In her 20s, Steiner began working in documentary film. She helped produce some 50 documentaries for the foreign ministry of Argentina.

Steiner's photojournalism career began around age 30, when she published a photograph of Argentina's president, Pedro Eugenio Aramburu for Life magazine. She went on to work for the Brazilian magazine O Cruzeiro, undertaking photo assignments around Latin America.

In 1960, she moved to New York and began freelancing for Time, Newsweek, The New York Times, Life, and Associated Press. That year, she photographed Fidel Castro during a famous visit to the United Nations. Her subjects from this time include artist Henri Cartier-Bresson, US president Jimmy Carter, and the state funeral of John F. Kennedy.

In 2000, the Leica Gallery in Manhattan held a retrospective of her work.

Steiner died on June 7, 2023, at age 95.

== Personal life ==
Steiner moved to Westchester County, New York, in the early 1970s. A longtime resident of Pound Ridge, she spent 24 years living with her husband, psychiatrist Meyer Monchek, who died in 1992.
