= Hiram Halle =

American businessman, inventor, and philanthropist

Hiram J. Halle
- Born: 1867; Cleveland, Ohio
- Died: 1944 (aged 76–77); Pound Ridge, NY
- Occupation: Businessman

Hiram J. Halle (1867–1944) was an American businessman, inventor, and philanthropist. He was also part owner of Gulf Oil company. Halle was dedicated to Jewish causes during World War II.

Born in Cleveland, Ohio, he dropped out of high school to work in his family business—a dry goods store. Hiram Halle was a shy man considered to be a workaholic. He ran his own personal WPA between 1936 and 1939, bringing European Jewish exiles to Pound Ridge to work on refurbishing vintage houses in the area.

== Inventions ==
Hiram Halle was the owner of numerous patents in many different industries. He invented a process for refining hydrocarbons in the production of marketable gasoline and hydrocarbon sulfonic acids, and an apparatus to distill oils. In addition, he developed sophisticated typewriter parts, including specific ways for the typewriter to feed through continuous sheets of paper and detach the strip at a desired place, a card/sheet holder allowing the typewriter to print upon a flat surface, enhancing the typing quality of the machine, and a new type of platen to facilitate displacement, replacement, and adjustment of work. He also developed parts for typewriter machines specifically related to the printing of books that enabled the user to raise and lower the machine to make printing more convenient and time efficient.

Hiram Halle also invented a new way to hang and secure clothing garments with a hook and eye, increasing the ease and safety of garment hanging. Continuing his inventive streak, Halle developed a new kind of multi-perforated bill statement sheet with many separating areas to tear off statements.

== New School ==
Halle was an integral part of the creation of The University in Exile—an extension of the New School for Social Research. Founded in 1933 by Alvin Johnson, the University in Exile was dedicated to rescuing scholars who had lost their positions under Hitler during that time. Johnson sought $120,000 to finance 15 scholars over a two-year period at salaries of $4,000 per year. Halle was "captivated" by Johnson's idea and pledged the entire sum, requesting that he remain anonymous. With the grant from Halle, Johnson actively recruited members of the German intellectual and activist community. In 1934, the organization took the name Graduate Faculty of Political and Social Science. Other notable donations from refugee aid organizations included The Rockefeller Foundation and the Emergency Committee in Aid of Displaced German Scholars.

Between 1933 and 1945, the New School helped hundreds of European scholars and artists, including Mario Einaudi, Claude Lévi-Strauss, Wilhelm Reich, and Gaetano Salvemini, in the social sciences and history, and Herbert Berghof, Fritz Eichenberg, Erwin Piscator, and George Szell in the arts.

There is a Hiram J. Halle Fellowship that is awarded annually at the New School. It is given to doctoral candidates who have demonstrated "outstanding merit" and are considered candidates of "special competence and originality" by New School faculty.

== Universal Oil Products ==
More businessman than scientist, Halle, nevertheless, nurtured an atmosphere of respect for research in which top scientists thrived. In 1914, J. Ogden Armour hired him to manage the newly created Universal Oil Products company, which had as its main asset the Dubbs patents for cracking oil. Halle was elected president of UOP in 1919, the year C. P. Dubbs perfected a continuous-circulation process that proved superior to the original patent and to any other method of refining oil. Halle chose to license the Dubbs process to all refiners rather than enter the refining business in competition with them. This decision became the business formula under which UOP still operates. Halle remained in charge of UOP until his death in 1944 at age 76.

As reported in The New York Times By Barbara Crossette at May 29, 1977

== Riverside ==
The Riverside research and development laboratory was conceived in 1921 by Hiram J. Halle, the chief executive officer of Universal Oil Products (now simply UOP), as a focal point where the best and brightest scientists could create new products and provide scientific support for the oil refining industry. By 1921, that industry was growing rapidly as increasing numbers of automobiles led to greater demand for refined oil products. The establishment of Riverside gave independent oil refiners access to scientific research that allowed them to compete with the major oil companies. Halle also thought the laboratory would make a positive statement about the influence of his new organization.

== Pound Ridge ==
Halle moved to Pound Ridge, New York, part of wealthy Westchester County, New York located about an hour outside of New York City. He arrived in 1928 at the age of 61 at a time when the farming community was in economic decline. Halle bought 33 homes over the next decade and worked on improving these homes, 13 of which are now on the National Register of Historic Places. He also purchased a former farm on Trinity Pass Road, moved some barns to the property, and used them to store his vast collection of English and American antiques. Halle created a workshop on his property where his team of 60 laborers worked, and also paid locals to rebuild the stone walls and perform other repairs in town. With unemployment rampant during the Great Depression, Halle, the largest landowner, was also the largest employer in town. There is some controversy over whether his changes to these homes are considered restorations to reflect "colonial revivalism" or straight out renovations. Today, town historians say his changes were drastic and call his changes to these homes as "hallecized".

Halle was also dedicated to the development of his adopted hometown, Pound Ridge, New York. Between 1936 and 1939 he brought Jewish exiles to Pound Ridge to restore classic homes. This work played a key role in revitalizing the town. His philanthropy also extended to the town's farmers left struggling through the Depression. His purchases of family homesteads afforded the families enough money to leave town or allow those who stayed to remain on Halle's payroll.

Halle also boasted a private collection of historically important books and documents, including the original edition of Richard Carmarden's A Caveat for the Quene (1570). Additionally, Halle owned a now famous collection of Georgian furniture, paintings, works by Epstein, and many other important pieces of artwork.

Some actors and entertainers have flocked to Pound Ridge, New York and made it their homes, because of its small town quality, privacy, and easy commute to Manhattan. Some famous residents, past and present, include: Susan Sarandon, Tim Robbins, Christopher Reeve, Eartha Kitt, Ellen Barkin, Benny Goodman, Richard Gere, Mike Myers, Jessica Tandy, Jane Pauley, and many others.

The Pound Ridge Historic District was added to the National Register of Historic Places in 1985.

== Hiram Halle Memorial Library ==
The library in Pound Ridge, located at 258 Hiram Halle Library, on Route #124 in Pound Ridge, New York, is named for him, the Hiram Halle Memorial Library. Its original building was an old schoolhouse sold to the town by the Halle Family Trust.

The Hiram Halle Library opened in 1952 and today has a collection of over 60,000 items including books, magazines, CDs, talking- book cassettes and videos. The Library's collection is particularly strong in the arts, biographies, mysteries and cookbooks. In addition, the Library offers an electronic database and Internet access for reference and research. Through the Interlibrary Loan Program, books not owned by the Library can be provided quickly and efficiently via Westlynx, the computerized card catalog of Westchester's 38 public libraries and other data bases.

The Library also offers activities such as The Adult Learning Center, arts and craft exhibits, films, concerts, lectures and book-discussion programs year round. The Library also sponsors a wide range of children's activities including Winter and Spring vacation programs, story hours, holiday activities, arts and crafts workshops, and the annual Summer Reading Program.

The Pound Ridge Library Foundation announced the launching of a $2.9 million Capital Campaign that would serve to expanding and repairing the old library. The campaign is estimated to take up to five years and will use tax deductible contributions.

Cleveland-born actress Halle Berry was named for Halle's family Cleveland department store.

Click here for a look at a period photo of this library

== Historical Marker ==
April 28, 2019, the Pound Ridge Historical Society and the Jewish American Society for Historic Preservation placed and dedicated a historical marker to Hiram Halle. The bronze marker is located in a special garden setting outside the Pound Ridge Historical Society in Pound Ridge, N.Y.

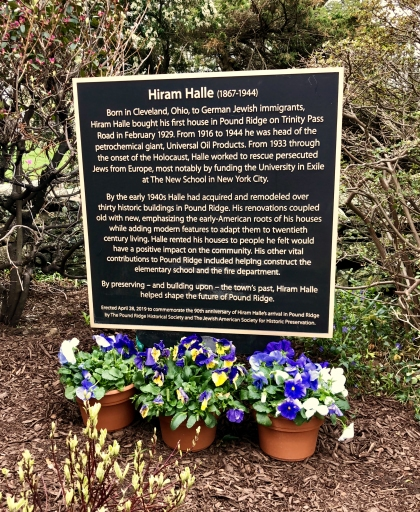
Hiram Halle Historical Marker - Pound Ridge, New York

== See also ==
- Louis J. Halle, Jr.
- Hart Schaffner Marx

== Sources ==
- History | The New School for Social Research
- "The Jewish Historical Society of Lower Fairfield County, Hiram Halle". Stamfordhistory.org.
- The Record-Review, 12/31/99
- Rutkoff; Scott (1998). New School: A History of the New School for Social Research. Simon and Schuster. ISBN 978-0-684-86371-9.
- Owens, Mitchell (February 2, 1995). "Washington Slept Here When He Was Very Old". New York Times.
- "Cracking Wealth". Time. January 19, 1931. Archived from the original on November 2, 2012.
- The American Jewish Committee Annual Report 1940-1941 (PDF)
- US Patent 804720 (PDF), November 14, 1905
- Pound Ridge Library
- Mary Mcaleer Vizard (March 31, 1996). "If You're Thinking of Living In/Pound Ridge, N.Y.;Affluent, Rural and Very, Very Private". New York Times. Pound Ridge (Ny).
- Mitgang, Herbert (March 18, 1994). "Books of The Times; On Another List: Scholars Saved From the Nazis". New York Times.
- "Patent US804720 - Bill or statement blank. - Google Patents".
- "Patent US773287 - Type-writing machine. - Google Patents".
- Hiram J. Halle was also an artist and a painter. Here is an example of his work: Royalty Free Stock Photos, Illustrations, Vector Art, and Video Clips - Getty Images
