= Paul Westcott =

Paul Westcott (born April 22) is President and CEO of political and consumer data powerhouse, L2. Formerly he was a senior digital editor for iHeartMedia. He is a frequent guest to talk about politics and political data siriusxm POTUS to discuss political data.

== Early life and education ==
Westcott was born to David and Paula Westcott on April 22. Westcott started his career in media working at WFUV at Fordham University where he anchored, reported and produced local news for the NPR Affiliate. Upon graduating (May 2006) he earned a master's degree in Political science while working for NBC News in New York. He graduated from Fordham University's Graduate School of Arts and Sciences in (May 2008).

== Career ==
Westcott had a short stint as a production assistant for the O'Reilly Factor before becoming a New York-based Assignment Editor for NBC News, covering breaking and planned events on the network's news desk. During his time at NBC Westcott worked for the national desk covering domestic news and the International Desk covering the world and working with NBC News' many international bureaus. Prior to leaving, Westcott covered the 2008 President race from the network's political desk.

In 2008 Westcott started at iHeartMedia as senior digital news/political editor for the company's 850+ radio station websites. After the 2008 election, Westcott was asked to create a channel for iHeartRadio iHeart's digital platform specifically covering Washington and the President. The White House Brief launched in May 2009 as short news loop and grew into a two-hour show with a massive digital reach, along with an aggressive sales strategy built in large part by Westcott and his production team.

Westcott maintained a role with iHeartMedia's digital properties as a political news editor overseeing all political news content. After building relationships within the political community specifically with campaigns, consultants, unions, and trade associations Westcott went to work for L2, America's leading provider of voter, consumer, and modeled data. Heading up the company's business development program since 2014 Westcott has grown L2's salesforce, expanded their reach into national media organizations, Presidential campaigns, and into the commercial market.

Currently, Westcott is the Vice President of Sales & Marketing at L2.
