= Bedford Central School District =

School district in the U.S. state of New York

Address
- 632 South Bedford Road Bedford, New York, 10506; United States

District information
- Type: Public
- Grades: K–12
- NCES District ID: 3619950

Students and staff
- Students: 3,795 (2020–2021)
- Teachers: 326.69 (on an FTE basis)
- Staff: 403.15 (on an FTE basis)
- Student–teacher ratio: 11.62:1

Other information
- Website: www.bcsdny.org

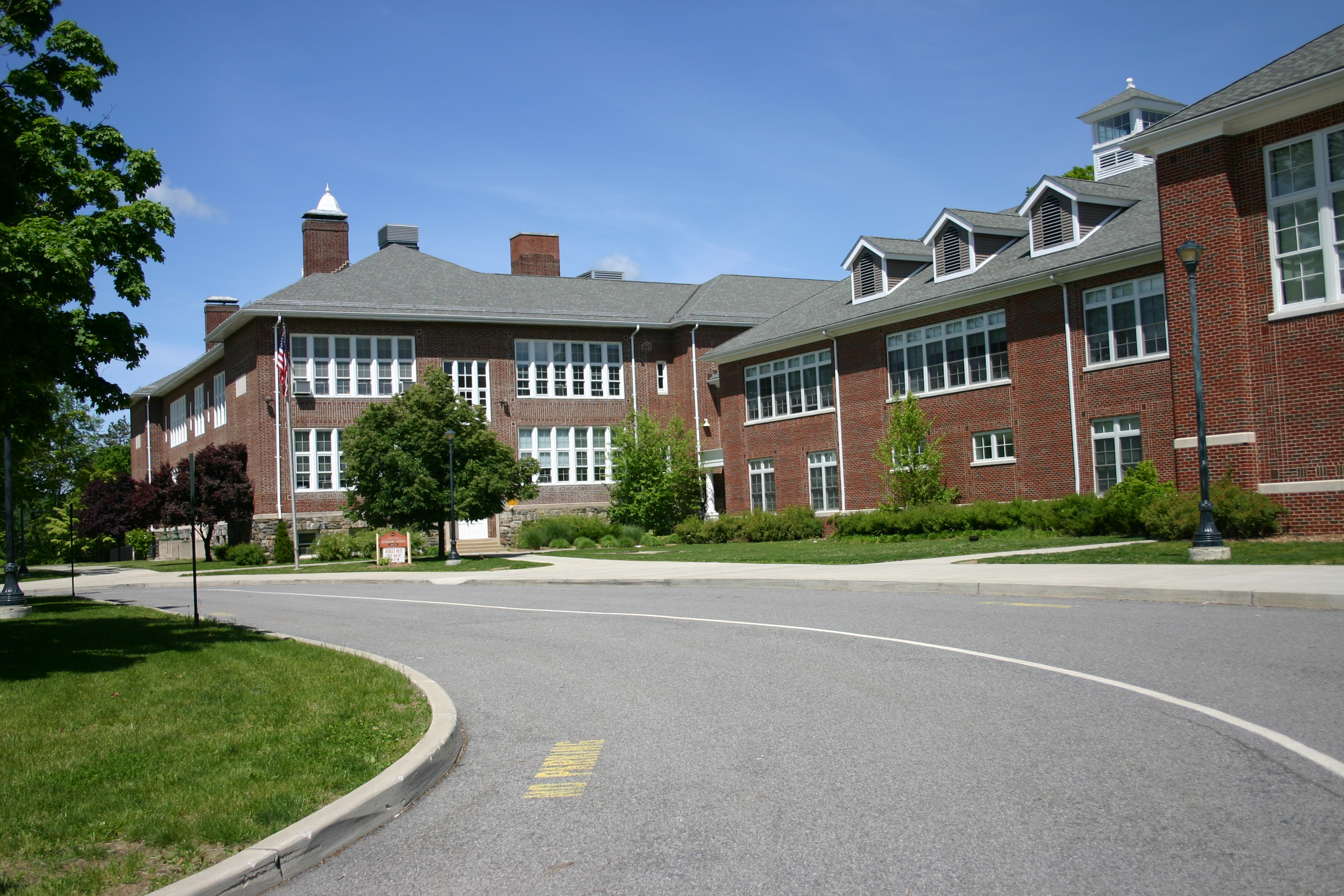
Mt. Kisco Elementary School

Bedford Central School District is a school district located approximately 50 minutes north of New York City in northern Westchester County, New York, United States. The Bedford Central School District is composed of seven schools - Fox Lane High School, Fox Lane Middle School, Bedford Village Elementary School, Bedford Hills Elementary School, West Patent Elementary School, Pound Ridge Elementary School, and Mt. Kisco Elementary School - serving students from Bedford Hills, Mt. Kisco, Bedford Village, Pound Ridge, and Bedford Corners. Each elementary school serves one town/village/hamlet, except for West Patent, which serves Bedford Hills and Bedford Corners.

The middle school, the high school, and the Bedford Central School District administrative buildings are all on the Fox Lane High School campus, near Interstate 684. The campus includes three soccer fields, a multipurpose astroturf field, a track that encircles the multipurpose field, and several baseball diamonds.

The superintendent of the district is Dr. Robert Glass.

== Restoration and renovation ==
Several old school buildings within the district were in a state of disrepair, including West Patent Elementary School and Fox Lane Middle School. Both were in need of new roofs, electrical work and more. On October 22, 2013, voters in the Town of Bedford who were members of the Bedford Central School District approved a $31,828,238 Capital Improvement Project proposed by the Bedford Central School District. The approval was by a wide margin. A total of 1,825 votes were cast, with 1,197 votes in favor and 628 votes against. The Capital Improvement Project will be funded with a combination of short-term notes and long-term bonds, and with an intent to minimize the increase in tax levy to homeowners and the length of time during which the dollar amount of that increase will apply. The project was slated to begin as soon as possible, and was expected to be completed in 2016. Large portions of the plan call for renovations at West Patent Elementary School and the Fox Lane Campus. These were to include renovations for the purpose of complying with the Americans With Disabilities Act, roof replacements and other structural renovations identified as necessary in the course of a years-long study. Allocations will also be made towards roofing replacements at Bedford Hills Elementary School, Bedford Village Elementary School and Pound Ridge Elementary School.

== 2020 Coronavirus closures ==
On March 11, 2020, BCSD officials announced the entire school district would be closed for the following two days as a precautionary measure due to a staff member from Fox Lane Middle School being placed under self-quarantine while awaiting testing for the coronavirus.

It was later announced on March 13 that the school district would remain closed through April 3 which was later extended until the end of the 2020 school year.

The district resumed hybrid instruction at the beginning of the 2020–2021 school year and returned to full in-person instruction in April 2021.
