= Louis J. Halle Jr. =

American naturalist, U.S. State Department official, author, and academic (1910– 1998)

Louis Joseph Halle Jr. (17 November 1910, New York City – 13 August 1998, Geneva, Switzerland) was an American naturalist, author, U.S. State Department official, and professor of international studies in Geneva.

Halle received his bachelor's degree from Harvard University in 1932.

As a young man, he worked for a railway company in Central America and later with a publishing house in New York. For a year, he did graduate study in anthropology at Harvard, then explored boundary rivers between Guatemala and Mexico by mule and dugout canoe.

He served in the US Army before World War II and in the Coast Guard during World War II. He was a Latin American specialist employed by the US State Department Policy Planning Staff from the mid-1940s to 1954. From 1954 to 1956 at the University of Virginia, he was a researcher on American foreign policy. He became in 1956 a professor at the Graduate Institute of International Studies in Geneva. He retired there as professor emeritus in 1973 but remained in Geneva.

He was the author of 22 books. In 1941 he received the John Burroughs Medal for Birds Against Men.

== Family ==
Louis J. Halle Jr. married Barbara Mark in 1946 and was the father of five children. The famous inventor and philanthropist Hiram Halle was a brother of Louis J. Halle Sr. and an uncle of Louis J. Halle Jr.

== Selected publications ==
- Transcaribbean: A Travel Book of Guatemala, El Salvador, British Honduras. NY; Toronto: Longmans, Green & Co. 1936; 311 pages
- Birds Against Men. NY: Viking Press. 1938; drawings by Lynd Ward, 228 pages
- River of Ruins. NY: H. Hotl & Co. 1941; 334 pages
- Spring in Washington. NY: William Sloane Associates. 1947; 225 pages
- Civilization and Foreign Policy: An Inquiry for Americans. NY: Harper. 1955.
- Choice for Survival. NY: Harper. 1958.
- Dream and Reality: Aspects of American Foreign Policy. NY: Harper. 1959.
- Men and Nations. Princeton, N.J.: Princeton University Press. 1962.
- Sedge. Frederick A. Praeger. 1963.
- The Society of Man. NY: Harper & Row. 1965.
- The Cold War as History. NY: Harper & Row. 1967.
- The Ideological Imagination: The Rise of Mass Bigotry in Our Time, and Its Roots in the Thought of Hobbes, Rousseau, and Marx. Chicago: Quadrangle Books. 1972.
- The Sea and the Ice: A Naturalist in Antarctica. Audubon Library. Boston: Houghton Mifflin, in cooperation with the National Audubon Society. 1973.
- Out of Chaos. Boston: Houghton Mifflin. 1977. ISBN 9780395253571.
- The Appreciation of Birds. Baltimore: The Johns Hopkins University Press. 1989. ISBN 9780801838699; drawings by Jens Gregersen, 140 pages
